= 19th New Zealand Parliament =

Term of the Parliament of New Zealand

19th Parliament of New Zealand
←	18th Parliament	20th Parliament	→

Overview
- Legislative body: New Zealand Parliament
- Term: 24 June 1915 – 5 November 1919
- Election: 1914 New Zealand general election
- Government: Reform Government

House of Representatives
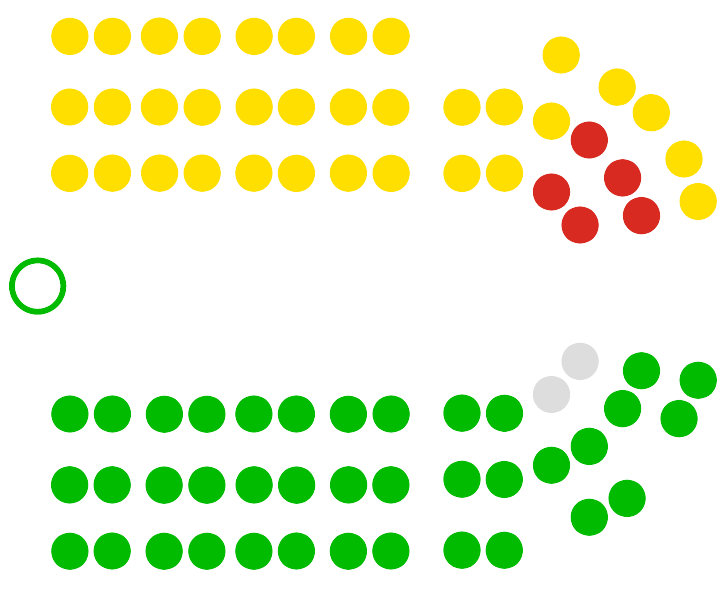
- Members: 80
- Speaker of the House: Frederic Lang
- Prime Minister: William Massey
- Leader of the Opposition: Joseph Ward

Legislative Council
- Members: 37 (at start); 39 (at end)
- Speaker of the Council: Sir Walter Carncross from 1 November 1918 — Charles Johnson until 13 June 1918† — Charles Bowen until 4 July 1915
- Leader of the Council: Sir Francis Bell

Sovereign
- Monarch: HM George V
- Governor-General as Governor until 28 June 1917: HE Rt. Hon. The Earl of Liverpool

The 19th New Zealand Parliament was a term of the New Zealand Parliament. It opened on 24 June 1915, following the 1914 election. It was dissolved on 27 November 1919 in preparation for 1919 election.

== Sessions ==
The 19th Parliament opened on 24 June 1915, following the 1914 general election. It sat for six sessions (with two sessions in 1918), and was dissolved on 27 November 1919.

Session	Opened	Ended	Prorogued
first	24 June 1915	12 October 1915	15 October 1915
second	9 May 1916	8 August 1916	9 August 1916
third	28 June 1917	1 November 1917	2 November 1917
fourth	9 April 1918	15 April 1918	17 April 1918
fifth	24 October 1918	9 December 1918	12 December 1918
sixth	28 August 1919	5 November 1919	7 November 1919

== Historical context ==
The 19th Parliament was the second term of the Reform Party government, which had been elected in the 1911 election. William Massey, the leader of the Reform Party, remained Prime Minister. The Liberal Party, led by former Prime Minister Joseph Ward, was technically the main opposition party, although for the majority of the term, the Liberals were part of a war-time coalition with Reform. Two small left-wing parties, the Social Democratic Party and the loosely grouped remnants of the United Labour Party, also held seats, and there was one left-wing independent (John Payne). During the 19th Parliament, the Social Democrats and most of the United Labour Party merged to form the modern Labour Party.

== Party standings ==
There were 616,043 electors on the European roll, with 521,525 (84.66%) voting, including 5,618 informal votes. Turnout including Maori voters was 540,075. The following table shows votes at and party strengths immediately after the 1914 election:

=== 1914–1916 ===
Party	Leader(s)	Seats at start
Reform Party	William Massey	40
Liberal Party	Joseph Ward	34
United Labour Party	Alfred Hindmarsh	3
Social Democrat Party	James McCombs	2
Independents		1

=== 1916–1919 ===
Party	Leader(s)	Seats at end
Reform Party	William Massey	39
Liberal Party	Joseph Ward	34
Labour Party	Alfred Hindmarsh, then Harry Holland	5
Independents		2

== Members ==
=== Initial MPs ===
76 general and 4 Māori electorates existed for the 19th Parliament.

The following are the results of the 1914 general election:

Key

Liberal Reform United Labour Social Democrat Independent Labour Independent

Electorate results for the 1914 New Zealand general election
Electorate	Incumbent	Winner	Majority	Runner up
General electorates
Ashburton	William Nosworthy		157	William Maslin
Auckland Central	Albert Glover		2,302	Michael Joseph Savage
Auckland East	Arthur Myers		2,507	Arthur Holmes
Auckland West	James Bradney	Charles Poole	1,411	James Bradney
Awarua	Sir Joseph Ward		1,226	John Hamilton
Avon	George Russell		1,073	Dan Sullivan
Bay of Islands	Vernon Reed		108	Peter Buck
Bay of Plenty	William MacDonald		965	Kenneth Williams
Bruce	James Allen		693	Charles Smith
Buller	James Colvin		2,195	George Powell
Chalmers	Edward Clark	James Dickson	686	William Mason
Christchurch East	Thomas Davey	Henry Thacker	1,890	Hiram Hunter
Christchurch North	Leonard Isitt		1,217	Henry Toogood
Christchurch South	Harry Ell		2,333	Gains Whiting
Clutha	Alexander Malcolm		1,009	John Jenkinson
Dunedin Central	Charles Statham		12	Jim Munro
Dunedin North	George Thomson	Andrew Walker	322	George Thomson
Dunedin South	Thomas Sidey		2,697	Thomas Dalton
Dunedin West	John A. Millar	William Downie Stewart	345	John Johnson
Eden	John Bollard	James Parr	2,456	William Tuck
Egmont	Charles Wilkinson		894	David Astbury
Ellesmere	Heaton Rhodes		273	James Free
Franklin	William Massey		2,928	Arthur Glass
Gisborne	Sir James Carroll		1,249	Harry de Lautour
Grey	Paddy Webb		980	Henry Michel
Grey Lynn	John Payne		89	Murdoch McLean
Hawke's Bay	Hugh Campbell	Robert McNab	40	Hugh Campbell
Hurunui	George Forbes		1,486	William Banks
Hutt	Thomas Wilford		943	Albert Samuel
Invercargill	Josiah Hanan		1,590	John Lillicrap
Kaiapoi	David Buddo		1,181	David Jones
Kaipara	Gordon Coates		1,118	Richard Hoe
Lyttelton	James McCombs		1,598	Malcolm Miller
Manukau	Frederic Lang		1,224	John McLarin
Marsden	Francis Mander		940	Edmund Purdie
Masterton	George Sykes		193	Alexander Hogg
Mataura	George Anderson		174	William Mehaffey
Motueka	Roderick McKenzie	Richard Hudson	602	Roderick McKenzie
Napier	Vigor Brown		2,215	George William Venables
Nelson	Harry Atmore	Thomas Field	90	Harry Atmore
Oamaru	Ernest Lee		338	John MacPherson
Ohinemuri	Hugh Poland		100	Joseph Clark
Oroua	David Guthrie		1,119	John Morrison
Otago Central	Robert Scott		999	William Bodkin
Otaki	John Robertson	William Field	640	John Robertson
Pahiatua	James Escott		683	John Mathews
Palmerston	David Buick		1,109	Jim Thorn
Parnell	James Dickson		1,172	Jeremiah Sullivan
Patea	George Pearce		118	William Morrison
Raglan	Richard Bollard		1,448	William Thompson
Rangitikei	Edward Newman		903	Robert Hornblow
Riccarton	George Witty		1,215	Bertram Bunn
Selwyn	William Dickie		1,227	George Sheat
Stratford	John Hine		637	Bill Hawkins
Taranaki	Henry Okey		201	Daniel Hughes
Taumarunui	Charles Wilson	William Jennings	205	Charles Wilson
Tauranga	William Herries		1,992	Ralph Stewart
Temuka	Thomas Buxton	Charles Talbot	407	Charles Kerr
Thames	Thomas Rhodes		515	Edmund Taylor
Timaru	James Craigie		1,110	Frank Smith
Waikato	Alexander Young		2,193	Alexander Scholes
Waimarino	Robert Smith		1,995	Hugh Speed
Waipawa	George Hunter		138	Albert Jull
Wairarapa	Walther Buchanan	J. T. Marryat Hornsby	60	Walther Buchanan
Wairau	Richard McCallum		369	John Duncan
Waitaki	Francis Smith	John Anstey	156	Norton Francis
Waitemata	Alexander Harris		1,013	Henry Cromwell Tewsley
Wanganui	Bill Veitch		852	Frederick Pirani
Wakatipu	William Fraser		897	Joseph Stephens
Wallace	John Thomson		881	Alexander Rodger
Wellington Central	Frank Fisher	Robert Fletcher	2,329	Frank Fisher
Wellington East	Alfred Newman		48	David McLaren (Note: Labour was narrowly ahead on election night, but after a counting error was discovered, the seat was won by Reform)
Wellington North	Alexander Herdman		2,655	William Turnbull
Wellington South	Alfred Hindmarsh		1,215	John Luke
Wellington Suburbs and Country	William Bell	Robert Wright	1,002	Frank Moore
Westland	Tom Seddon		826	Arthur Paape
Māori electorates
Eastern Maori	Sir Āpirana Ngata		2,825	Hetekia Pere
Northern Maori	Te Rangi Hīroa	Taurekareka Henare	176	Hemi te Paa
Southern Maori	Taare Parata		238	Teone Matapura Erihana
Western Maori	Māui Pōmare	Māui Pōmare	2,107	Hema te Ao

Table footnotes:

=== By-elections during the 19th Parliament ===
There were a number of changes during the term of the 19th Parliament.

Electorate and by-election		Date	Incumbent	Cause	Winner
Dunedin Central	1915	3 February	Charles Statham	Resignation	Charles Statham
Bay of Islands	1915	8 June	Vernon Reed	Election declared void	William Stewart
Taumarunui	1915	15 June	William Jennings	Election declared void	William Jennings
Pahiatua	1916	17 August	James Escott	Death	Harold Smith
Hawke's Bay	1917	8 March	Robert McNab	Death	John Findlay
Bay of Islands	1917	17 March	William Stewart	Resignation	Vernon Reed
Grey	1917	24 November	Paddy Webb	Resignation	Paddy Webb
Wellington North	1918	12 February	Alexander Herdman	Resignation	John Luke
Southern Maori	1918	21 February	Taare Parata	Death	Hopere Uru
Grey	1918	29 May	Paddy Webb	Imprisonment	Harry Holland
Wellington Central	1918	3 October	Robert Fletcher	Death	Peter Fraser
Taranaki	1918	10 October	Henry Okey	Death	Sydney Smith
Palmerston	1918	19 December	David Buick	Death	Jimmy Nash
Wellington South	1918	19 December	Alfred Hindmarsh	Death	Bob Semple

=== Summary of changes ===
==== Party changes ====
- Thomas Rhodes, the Liberal Party MP for Thames, changed affiliation to the Reform Party in 1915.
- The Social Democratic Party and the loose United Labour Party grouping merged to form the modern Labour Party on 7 July 1916. One ULP member, Bill Veitch, rejected the merger, and carried on as an independent.

==== Deaths ====
- James Escott (Reform, Pahiatua) died on 28 July 1916.
  - 1916 Pahiatua by-election – won by Harold Smith (Reform)
- Robert McNab (Liberal, Hawkes Bay) died on 3 February 1917.
  - 1917 Hawkes Bay by-election – won by John Findlay (Liberal)
- Taare Parata (Liberal, Southern Maori) died on 8 January 1918.
  - 1918 Southern Maori by-election – won by Hopere Uru (Independent)
- Robert Fletcher (Liberal, Wellington Central) died on 4 September 1918.
  - 1918 Wellington Central by-election – won by Peter Fraser (Labour)
- Henry Okey (Reform, Taranaki) died on 13 September 1918
  - 1918 Taranaki by-election – won by Sydney Smith (Independent aligned with Liberals)
- Alfred Hindmarsh (Labour, Wellington South) died on 13 November 1918.
  - 1918 Wellington South by-election – won by Bob Semple (Labour)
- David Buick (Reform, Palmerston) died on 18 November 1918.
  - 1918 Palmerston by-election – won by Jimmy Nash (Reform)
- James Colvin (Liberal, Buller) died on 29 October 1919.
  - Seat remained vacant, as it was only two months until the general election.

==== Resignations ====
- William Stewart (Reform, Bay of Islands) resigned in March 1917. Stewart won the seat in a by-election when the victory of another Reform candidate, Vernon Reed, had been overturned, and Stewart's resignation opened the way for Reed to return via another by-election.
  - 1915 Bay of Islands by-election – won by William Stewart (Reform)
  - 1917 Bay of Islands by-election – won by Vernon Reed (Reform)
- Paddy Webb (Labour, Grey) resigned in November 1917. He then challenged the government to fight the resulting by-election on the issue of conscription, which Webb opposed. The government declined the challenge, and did not contest the by-election.
  - 1917 Grey by-election – won by Paddy Webb (Labour)
- Alexander Herdman (Reform, Wellington North) resigned in February 1918. Herdman, as Attorney-General, had just appointed himself to a judicial position, and was resigning in order to take up this role.
  - 1918 Wellington North by-election – won by John Luke (Reform)

==== Expulsions ====
- William Thomas Jennings (Liberal Party, Taumarunui) lost his seat in May 1915 when his election the previous year was declared void.
  - 1915 Taumarunui by-election – won by William Thomas Jennings (Liberal)
- Vernon Reed (Reform, Bay of Islands) lost his seat in May 1915 when his election the previous year was declared void. (His successor later resigned, allowing Reed to reclaim the seat).
  - 1915 Bay of Islands by-election – won by William Stewart (Reform)
- Paddy Webb (Labour, Grey) lost his seat in April 1918, having been jailed for refusing military service. (He had previously fought and won a by-election on the issue).
  - 1918 Grey by-election – won by Harry Holland (Labour)
