= 1917 Bay of Islands by-election =

New Zealand by-election

- 19 March 1917
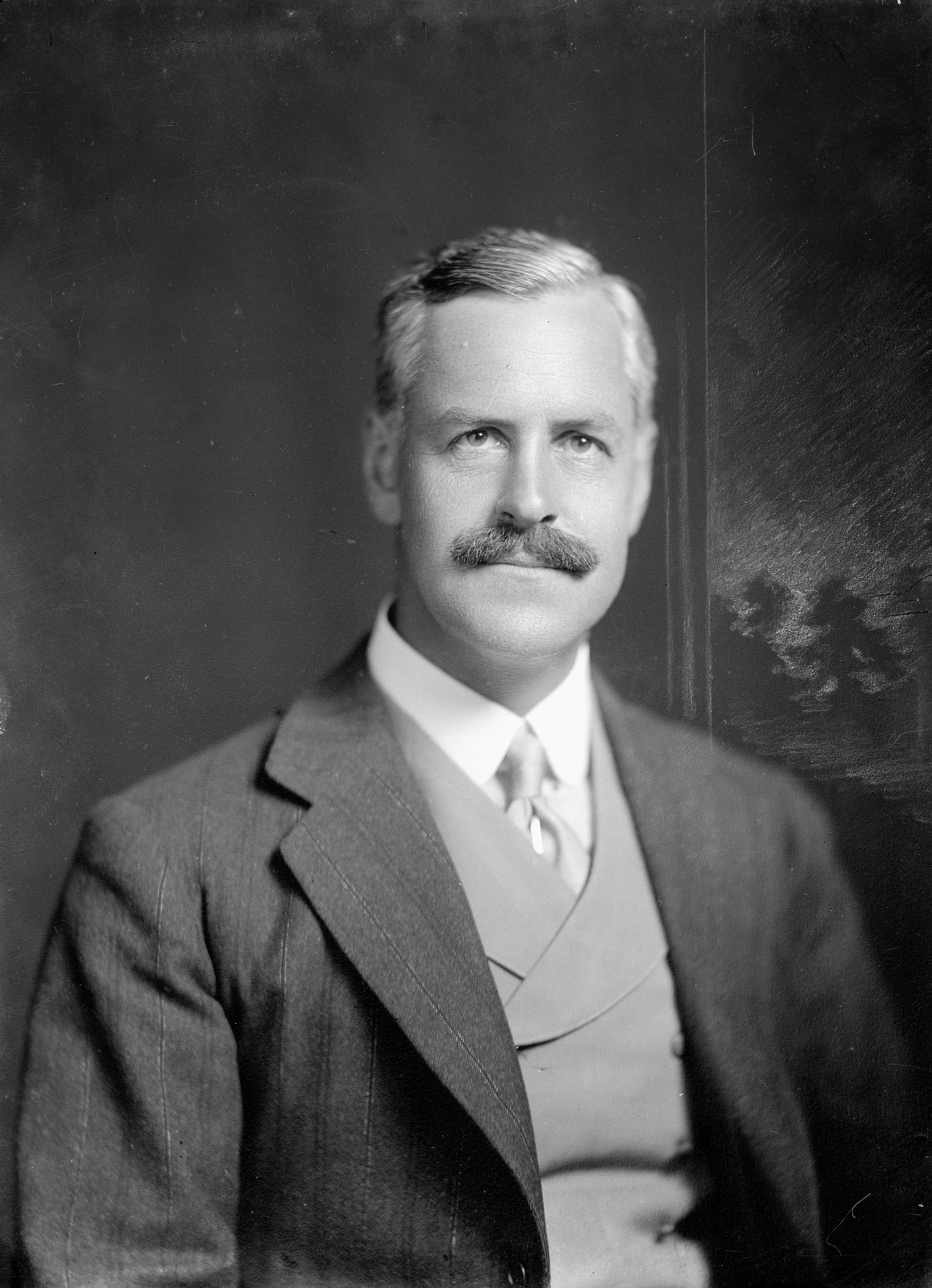
Candidate	Vernon Reed
Party	Reform
Popular vote	elected unopposed
Member before election
William Stewart
Reform
Elected Member
Vernon Reed
Reform

The 1917 Bay of Islands by-election was a by-election held on 19 March 1917 during the 19th New Zealand Parliament in the Northland electorate of Bay of Islands. The by-election came about because Vernon Reed's win in the 1914 general election had been declared void by an electoral court, and Reed barred from standing for a year. The seat was won by William Stewart, Reed's Reform Party colleague, in the resulting 1915 by-election. When Reed became eligible again, Stewart resigned and Reed won the 1917 by-election unopposed.

== Background ==
Reed was first elected to the Bay of Islands electorate in the 1908 general election as a candidate of the Liberal Party. The 1911 election resulted in significant losses for the Liberal Party and Joseph Ward's government survived a no-confidence motion on the casting vote of the speaker only. Ward chose to resign, though, and made way for a new liberal Prime Minister, Thomas Mackenzie. Reed expected to be part of the new cabinet and the media discussed that he might be appointed Attorney-General due to his legal background. Reed was invited to cabinet, but he did not join because the majority of the cabinet did not support his views of freehold. When the Mackenzie government faced a no-confidence vote in July 1912, Reed voted with the opposition, thus effectively joining the Reform Party.

Reed's switch to Reform caused problems in the 1914 election. George Wilkinson had been the Reform candidate in the Bay of Islands electorate in 1911, he was keen to represent Reform in that electorate in 1914, and he had the backing of the local electorate committee. Reed also wanted to run for Reform, and as he had the backing of the party head office, he was declared the official Reform candidate. Reed narrowly won the election against Te Rangi Hīroa of the Liberal Party, with Wilkinson coming third. Bill Veitch, at the time a United Labour Party MP in Wanganui, claimed that Wilkinson had been under immense pressure from the Reform Party not to contest the Bay of Islands election, and that William Massey had promised him a seat in the Legislative Council in return, an allegation later picked up by other media outlets but also implicating Reed in the affair.

This complaint was elevated to a formal election petition in April 1915 by Waipapakauri resident Edward Evans and Edward Parsons of Waipuna on the Whangaroa Harbour, who engaged a King's Counsel, John Findlay, and a solicitor, Bill Endean, as their counsel. Reed used his brother John, also a King's Counsel, as his legal representative. The primary complaint was that Reed had, through an intermediary, tried to convince Wilkinson to retire by promising him a seat on the Legislative Council, and to reimburse him for his election campaign expenses. On 8 May 1915, the petition was upheld Justice Chapman and Justice Hosking, the election declared void, and Reed barred from standing in another election for one year. Since 1913, there have been over 100 by-elections held in New Zealand, and this was one of only five cases where a general election was declared void by the courts.

1915, Stewart won the 8 June 1915 by-election against George Gardiner Menzies of the Liberal Party.

The New Zealand Herald was the first newspaper to report on 5 March 1917 that Stewart had resigned; the effective resignation date is recorded as 2 March. The editor of the North Otago Times offered the following explanation:

Mr Stewart silently served in the House of Representatives as a sort of political warming pan for the Bay of Islands seat while Mr Vernon Reed, its former occupier as a supporter of the Reform Party, marked time during the period of his technical disqualification as a candidate at the 1914 election. Immediately that time was over, Mr Stewart resigned owing to pressure of private business.

Stewart's explanation, however, was that he had made a hurried decision when he consented to standing in the 1915 by-election, and that soon after, he realised that he would have to give up his business if he wanted to effectively represent his constituency. Stewart maintained that he had intended to hand in his resignation several months earlier, but was persuaded to await the return of William Massey and Joseph Ward, who were in England to attend the Imperial War Conference. Massey and Ward left with their wives sometime after the 1916 session of Parliament finished on 8 August (newspapers had been instructed to not report their travel arrangements, but the news leaked out that they were travelling on the Rotorua via the Panama Canal), and they arrived in England in early October, expecting to leave again in November. But there were significant delays with the Imperial War Conference and in the end, it occurred from 21 March to 27 April 1917. As the next session of the New Zealand Parliament was expected to begin in June 1917, Stewart went ahead and handed in his resignation in early March, so that a new representative could be chosen before the session would begin, even though Massey and Ward were still in England.

After the 1914 election, the Reform and Liberal parties had reluctantly entered into a wartime coalition. Part of the agreement was that in case of a by-election, the incumbent party would not be opposed by the other coalition party.

== Result and aftermath ==
The writ was immediately issued when the resignation was announced, with a 10 March newspaper advertisement giving 19 March as the nomination date, and an election to be held on 29 March (if necessary). Reed announced his candidacy on the day the news of Stewart's resignation broke. Frank Herbert Phillips, who had been interpreter for the Legislative Council for many years, claimed to have received a strong requisition, but did not come forward as a candidate. Various chambers of commerce in Northland passed resolutions calling for the unopposed return of Reed to save the costs of a by-election. No other candidate coming forward, Reed was declared elected unopposed on nomination day.

One year later on 7 May 1918, Stewart was appointed to the Legislative Council. Reed remained the representative of the Bay of Islands electorate until he was defeated in the 1922 election.
