= Vernon Reed =

New Zealand politician

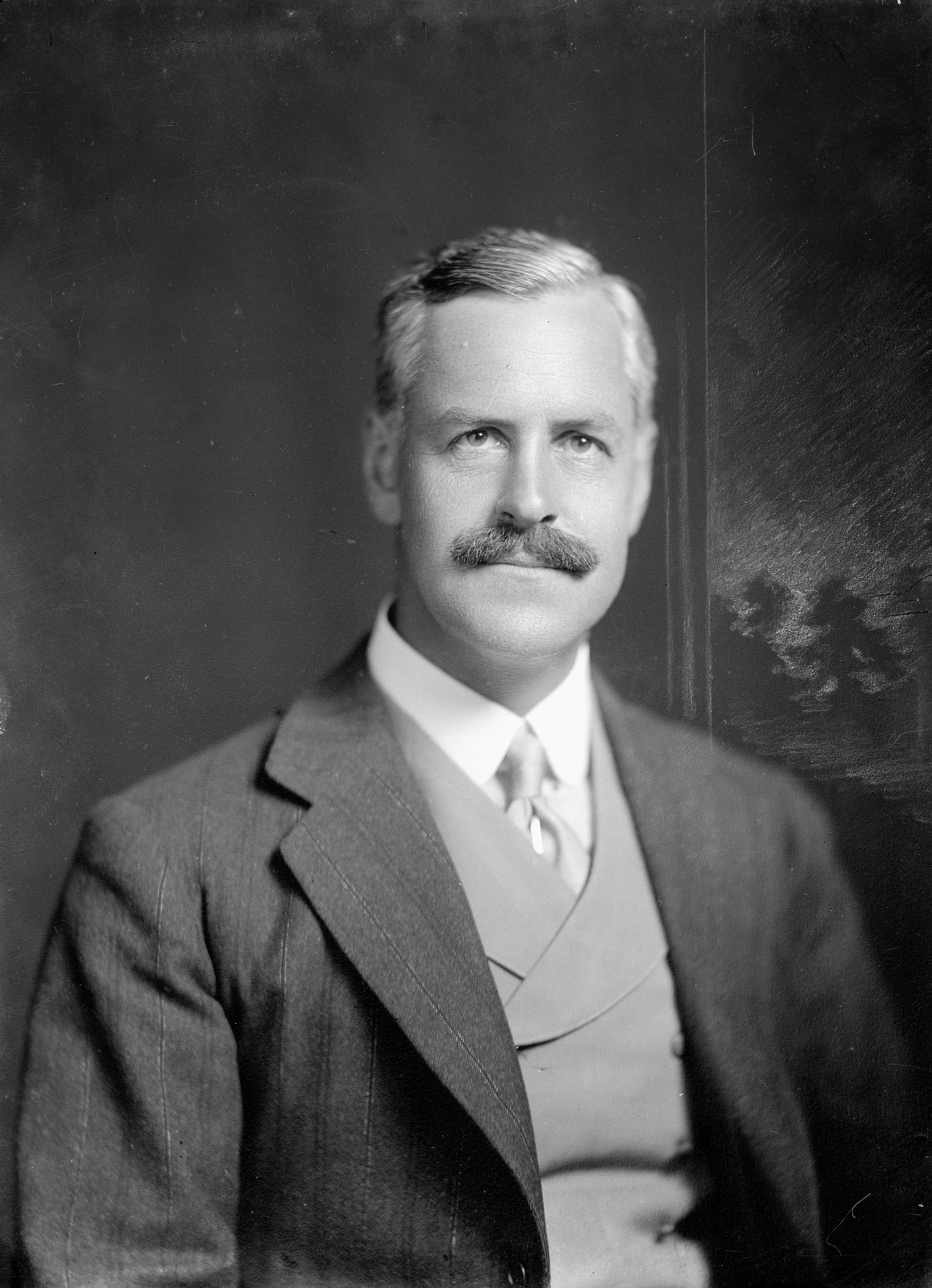
- Vernon Reed in 1910

Member of the New Zealand Parliament for Bay of Islands
- In office 17 November 1908 – 8 May 1915
- Preceded by: Robert Houston
- Succeeded by: William Stewart
- In office 19 March 1917 – 17 November 1922
- Preceded by: William Stewart
- Succeeded by: Allen Bell

Member of the New Zealand Legislative Council
- In office 16 June 1924 – 15 June 1931

Personal details
- Born: 7 May 1871 Auckland, New Zealand
- Died: 26 May 1963 (aged 92)
- Party: Liberal Party, then Reform Party
- Other political affiliations: National Party
- Relations: George McCullagh Reed (father); Sir John Reed (brother); James Fergusson (brother-in-law); Thomas Williams (father-in-law)
- Education: University of Sydney

Vernon Herbert Reed (7 May 1871 – 26 May 1963) was a Liberal Party and from 1912 a Reform Party member of parliament in New Zealand. He was later a member of the Legislative Council.

== Early life ==
Reed was the youngest son of George McCullagh Reed, a newspaper proprietor, and Jessie Chalmers Reed (née Ranken). He was born in Auckland, where his father had moved to in circa 1870 after several years in Queensland, Australia. An elder brother was John Reed.

Reed received his education at Victoria College, Jersey, Dulwich College, London, and the University of Sydney, New South Wales. He was in England from 1878 to 1887. In 1889, he joined the Daily Telegraph and in 1891 moved to The Sydney Morning Herald where he also stayed for two years. He moved to Kawakawa in the Bay of Islands at the end of 1893 or 1895 (sources differ) and commenced legal studies. He took over his brother's legal practice upon his brother's move to Auckland in 1896. He was admitted as a solicitor in 1899, and five years later, he was admitted as a barrister. Reed was clerk and treasurer to the Bay of Islands County.

Reed played cricket as a batter and bowler, representing both Dulwich College in 1886 and the Bay of Islands in 1897. He also played rugby union as a forward and represented Auckland Province in 1889, Victoria in 1890, New South Wales Colony in 1891 and 1892 and the Hawke's Bay Province in 1895. While in the Hawke's Bay, Reed captained the Waipawa Branch Union.

== Political career ==
New Zealand Parliament
Years	Term	Electorate	Party
1908–1911	17th	Bay of Islands	Liberal
1911–1912	18th	Bay of Islands	Liberal
1912–1914	Changed allegiance to:		Reform
1914–1915	19th	Bay of Islands	Reform
1917–1919	19th	Bay of Islands	Reform
1919–1922	20th	Bay of Islands	Reform

Reed won the Bay of Islands electorate in the 1908 general election as a candidate of the Liberal Party. The 1911 election resulted in significant losses for the Liberal Party and Joseph Ward's government survived a no-confidence motion on the casting vote of the speaker only. Ward chose to resign, though, and made way for a new liberal Prime Minister, Thomas Mackenzie. Reed expected to be part of the new cabinet and the media discussed that he might be appointed Attorney-General due to his legal background. Reed was invited to cabinet, but he did not join because the majority of the cabinet did not support his views of freehold. When the Mackenzie government faced a no-confidence vote in July 1912, Reed voted with the opposition, thus effectively joining the Reform Party.

Reed's switch to Reform caused problems in the 1914 election. George Wilkinson had been the Reform candidate in the Bay of Islands electorate in 1911, he was keen to represent Reform in that electorate in 1914, and he had the backing of the local electorate committee. Reed also wanted to run for Reform, and as he had the backing of the party head office, he was declared the official Reform candidate. Reed narrowly won the election against Te Rangi Hīroa of the Liberal Party, with Wilkinson coming third. Bill Veitch, at the time a United Labour Party MP in Wanganui, claimed that Wilkinson had been under immense pressure from the Reform Party not to contest the Bay of Islands election, and that William Massey had promised him a seat in the Legislative Council in return, an allegation later picked up by other media outlets but also implicating Reed in the affair.

This complaint was elevated to a formal election petition in April 1915 by Kawakawa resident Edward Evans, who engaged a King's Counsel, John Findlay, and a solicitor, Bill Endean, as his counsel. Reed used his brother, also a King's Counsel, as his counsel. The primary complaint was that Reed had, through an intermediary, tried to convince Wilkinson to retire by promising him a seat on the Legislative Council, and to reimburse him for his election campaign expenses. On 8 May 1915, the petition was upheld Justice Chapman and Justice Hosking, the election declared void, and Reed barred from standing in another election for one year. Since 1913, there have been over 100 by-elections held in New Zealand, and this was one of only five cases where a general election was declared void by the courts.

The resulting by-election was won by William Stewart in June 1915. Reed won the electorate again in 1917 after Stewart's resignation, and was defeated in 1922.

He was later appointed a member of the Legislative Council, from 1924 to 1931. In 1932, he hosted the Governor-General, The Viscount Bledisloe, and showed him the run-down and forgotten Busby house where the Treaty of Waitangi had been signed in 1840. The Viscount Bledisloe purchased the estate and gifted it to the nation; the Treaty House has since been registered by the New Zealand Historic Places Trust as a Category I historic place with registration number 6. Reed later wrote a book about the Bledisloe gift.

In 1926 Reed was appointed as one of three members of a Royal Commission (the 'Sim Commission') set up to investigate Māori land confiscations during the nineteenth century.

In 1935, he was awarded the King George V Silver Jubilee Medal. Reed joined the National Party and was one of the Auckland agitators against Adam Hamilton and for Charles Wilkinson.

=== Marriage ===
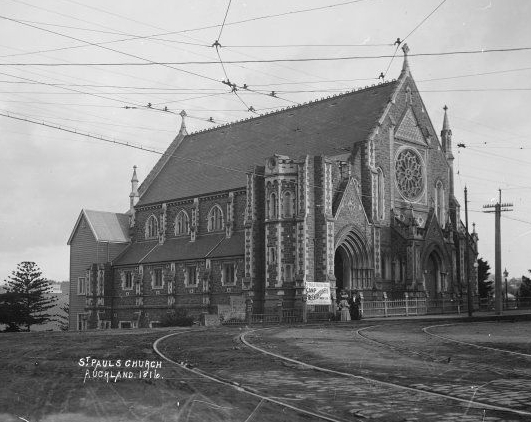
St Paul's Church in 1909

On 28 April 1909, Reed married Eila Mabel Williams at St Paul's Church in Auckland. His wife was from the family of missionaries who came to New Zealand from the 1820s on behalf of the Church Missionary Society. Her grandfather was Henry Williams, and her father was the runholder Thomas Coldham Williams (1825–1912). The portrait painter William Beetham was her maternal grandfather. The wedding ceremony was conducted by her father's cousin, Leonard Williams, who was Bishop of Waiapu. Her second cousin, archbishop Herbert Williams, assisted his father with the service.

Her younger sister Enid "Githa" Williams had married Royal Navy officer James Fergusson in 1901 in England; he was later to become Deputy Chief of the Naval Staff. Her elder sister Maude Burge née Williams was a New Zealand painter who lived in Saint-Tropez and was the painting companion of Frances Hodgkins Her husband's eldest brother, Sir Charles Fergusson, 7th Baronet, was the 3rd Governor-General of New Zealand (1924–1930).

Vernon and Eila Reed had three children:

- "Thomas" Walton Reed (6 December 1910 – 12 November 2006), born in Wellington
- "Nigel" Vernon Reed (31 October 1913 – 20 September 1997), born in Wellington
- "Elfie" Clare Temple Reed (20 November 1917 – 13 March 1991), born in Wellington; married name was Elliott

== Bibliography ==
- Reed, Vernon Herbert (1945). Historic Waitangi. Waitangi National Trust.
- Reed, Vernon Herbert (1957). The Gift of Waitangi: A History of the Bledisloe Gift. Auckland: A.H. & A.W. Reed.

== Notes ==
New Zealand Parliament
Preceded by Robert Houston	Member of Parliament for Bay of Islands; 1908–1915; 1917–1922	Succeeded by William Stewart
Preceded by William Stewart	Member of Parliament for Bay of Islands; 1908–1915; 1917–1922	Succeeded by Allen Bell
