= 1916 Pahiatua by-election =

New Zealand by-election

- 17 July 1916
- Turnout: 3,197 (51.23%)
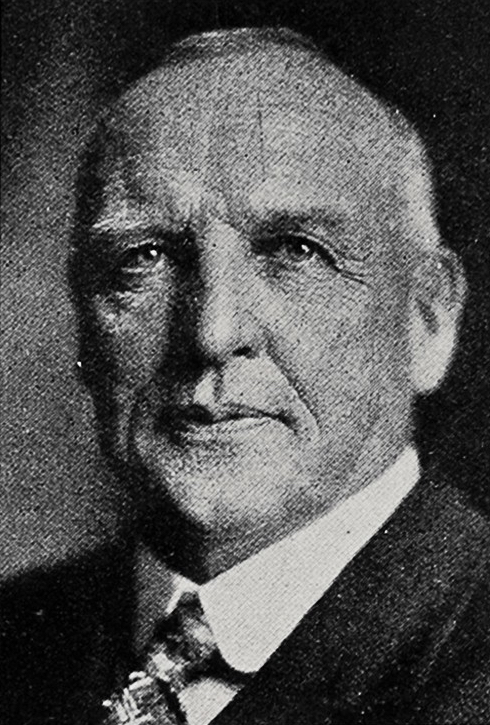

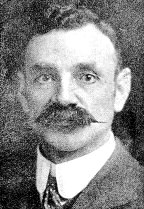
Candidate	Harold Smith	Bob Ross
Party	Reform	Liberal
Popular vote	1,521	1,438
Percentage	47.57	44.97
member before election
James Escott
Reform
Elected member
Harold Smith
Reform

The Pahiatua by-election of 1916 was a by-election held in the Pahiatua electorate during the 19th New Zealand Parliament, on 17 August 1916. It was caused by the death of incumbent MP James Escott of the Reform Party on 28 July, and was won by Harold Smith with a majority of 420.

== Results ==
The following table gives the election results:

1916 Pahiatua by-election
Party	Candidate	Votes	%	±%
Reform	Harold Smith	1,521	47.57	
Liberal	Robert Ross	1,438	44.97	
Labour	George McFarlane	238	7.44	
Majority		83	2.59	
Turnout		3,197	51.23	
Registered electors		6,241		
Reform hold		Swing		
