= Bob Ross (politician) =

New Zealand politician (1867–1949)

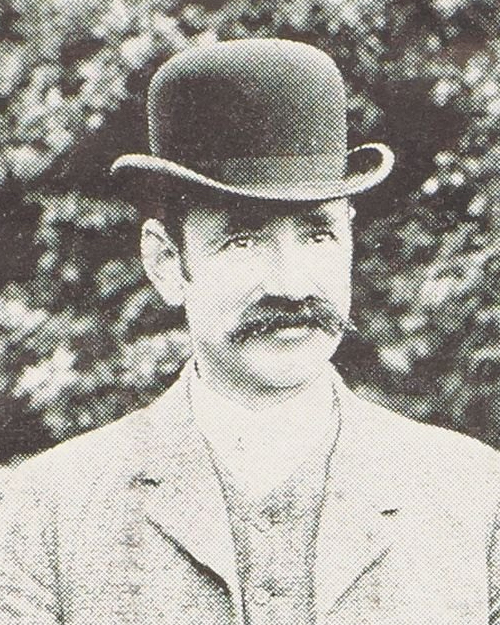

Member of the New Zealand Parliament for Pahiatua
- In office 6 December 1905 – 19 December 1911
- Preceded by: Bill Hawkins
- Succeeded by: James Escott

Personal details
- Born: 23 September 1867 Waikaia, New Zealand
- Died: 16 January 1949 (aged 81) Wellington, New Zealand
- Party: Liberal
- Spouse: Catherine Elizabeth Ryan (m. 1889)
- Children: 5

Robert Beatson Ross (23 September 1867 – 16 January 1949), known as Bob, was a labour friendly Liberal Member of Parliament in New Zealand.

== Biography ==
=== Early life and family ===
Ross was born on 23 September 1867 at Otama Station, near Waikaia in Southland, the son of Robert Ross. He was educated at Dunedin High School and joined the Railway Department as a clerk and telegraphist in 1883. He was subsequently appointed the postmaster and stationmaster for Dipton at 1888, and later held similar positions at Te Aroha and Lincoln Junction. Upon the death of his father in 1902 he left the railway service, then went to live on his farm at Riversdale. In 1903, Ross sold his farm interest and attained work with the Colonial Mutual Life Assurance Society, setting up practice in Woodville, Hawke's Bay.

Ross married Catherine Elizabeth Ryan in 1889, and the couple went on to have four daughters and one son.

=== Member of Parliament ===
New Zealand Parliament
Years	Term	Electorate	Party
1905–1908	16th	Pahiatua	Liberal–Labour
1908–1911	17th	Pahiatua	Liberal–Labour

While living in Southland, Ross unsuccessfully contested the Wakatipu seat in 1902. He won the lower North Island Pahiatua electorate in the 1905 general election, and held it until 1911, when he was defeated by James Escott. He later attempted to regain the seat in the 1916 Pahiatua by-election, but was defeated.

=== Later life and death ===
After leaving parliament, Ross took up farming again on land at Porangahau. He farmed for twelve years until he had a period of ill-health and had to be taken to Napier in 1923 for an operation, which was successful. Ross served on the Hawke's Bay Land Board and the Hawke's Bay Education Board. In 1924 he joined the Public Trust in Napier as a farming estates supervisor and valuer. He then resigned from the Public Trust to practice independently. In 1935 he received the King George V Silver Jubilee Medal.

He died in Wellington on 16 January 1949 and was buried at Karori Cemetery. His wife predeceased him and was survived by his one son and four daughters.

== Citations ==
New Zealand Parliament
Preceded by Bill Hawkins	Member of Parliament for Pahiatua; 1905–1911	Succeeded by James Escott
