= Harold Smith (New Zealand politician) =

New Zealand politician

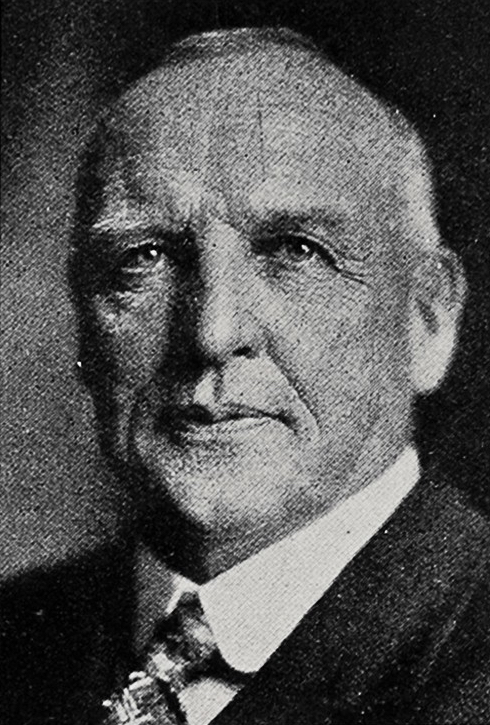
Harold Smith

New Zealand Parliament
Years	Term	Electorate	Party
1916–1919	19th	Pahiatua	Reform

George Harold Smith (1866 – 21 April 1936) was a Reform Party member of Parliament in New Zealand.

Smith was born in Masterton in 1866, the son of Major J. Valentine Smith.

Smith unsuccessfully contested the Pahiatua electorate in the 1899 election against the incumbent, John O'Meara, of the Liberal Party.

He won the Pahiatua electorate in a 1916 by-election after the death of the previous MP, James Escott, and retired in 1919.
