= 1904 Pahiatua by-election =

New Zealand by-election

- 28 July 1904
- Turnout: 3,369 (79.16%)
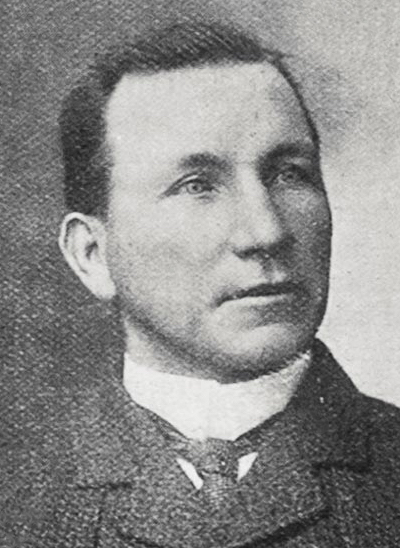

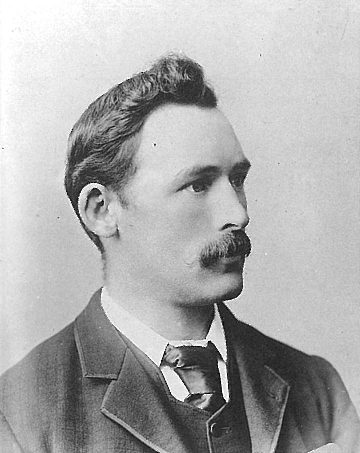

Candidate	Bill Hawkins	Lindsay Buick	Samuel Bolton
Party	Independent Liberal	Liberal	Conservative
Popular vote	1,418	1,323	476
Percentage	41.74	38.94	14.01
Member before election
John O'Meara
Liberal
Elected Member
Bill Hawkins
Independent Liberal

The Pahiatua by-election was a by-election in the New Zealand electorate of Pahiatua, a rural seat at the south-east of the North Island. The election was won by Bill Hawkins who stood as an independent Liberal.

== Background ==
The by-election was held on 28 July 1904, and was precipitated by the death of sitting Liberal member of parliament John O'Meara on 3 July 1904.

Former Wairau MP Lindsay Buick was selected by the government as the official Liberal candidate. Frank C. Perry announced himself as a candidate, but later withdrew his candidature. His supporters then met to decide whether to support either Hawkins or Bolton in order to defeat the government candidate (Buick).

== Result ==
The following table gives the election results:

1904 Pahiatua by-election
Party	Candidate	Votes	%	±%
Independent Liberal	Bill Hawkins	1,418	41.74	
Liberal	Lindsay Buick	1,323	38.94	
Conservative	Samuel Bolton	476	14.01	−27.40
Liberal	David Crewe	138	4.06	
Independent	Donald Munro	14	0.42	
Informal votes		28	0.82	
Majority		95	2.79	
Turnout		3,397	79.16	+2.88
Registered electors		4,291		
