= 1936 Birthday Honours (New Zealand) =

Awards list for New Zealand

The 1936 King's Birthday Honours in New Zealand, celebrating the official birthday of King Edward VIII, were appointments made by the King on the advice of the New Zealand government to various orders and honours to reward and highlight good works by New Zealanders. They were announced on 23 June 1936.

The recipients of honours are displayed here as they were styled before their new honour.

== Knight Bachelor ==
- Dr James Sands Elliott MB ChB FRACS – of Wellington. For public services.
- The Honourable John Ranken Reed CBE – senior judge of the Supreme Court, and acting chief justice.
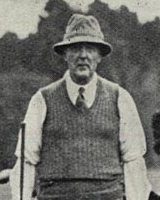
Sir James Elliott

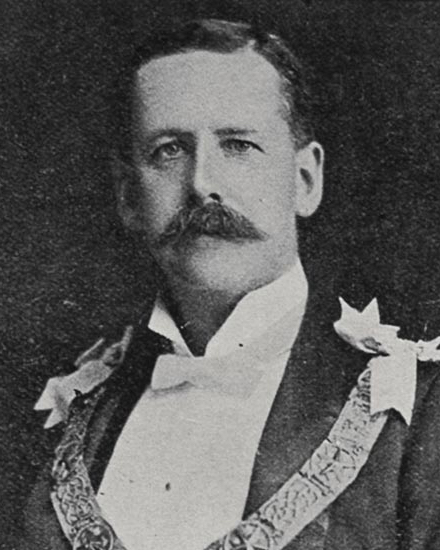
Sir John Reed

== Order of Saint Michael and Saint George ==
=== Companion (CMG) ===
- Carl August Berendsen LLM – permanent head of the Prime Minister's Department and secretary for External Affairs, Wellington.
- Daniel Vickery Bryant – of Te Rapa. For social-welfare and philanthropic services.
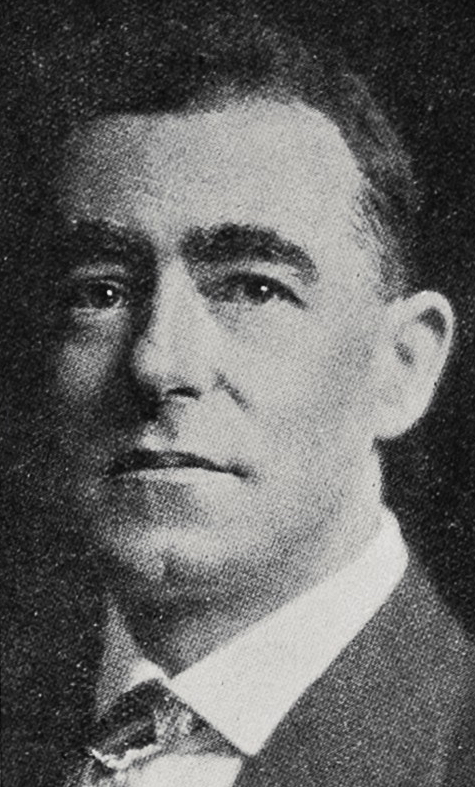
Carl Berendsen

== Order of the British Empire ==
=== Commander (CBE) ===
Civil division

- Jean Gardner Batten. For general services to aviation.
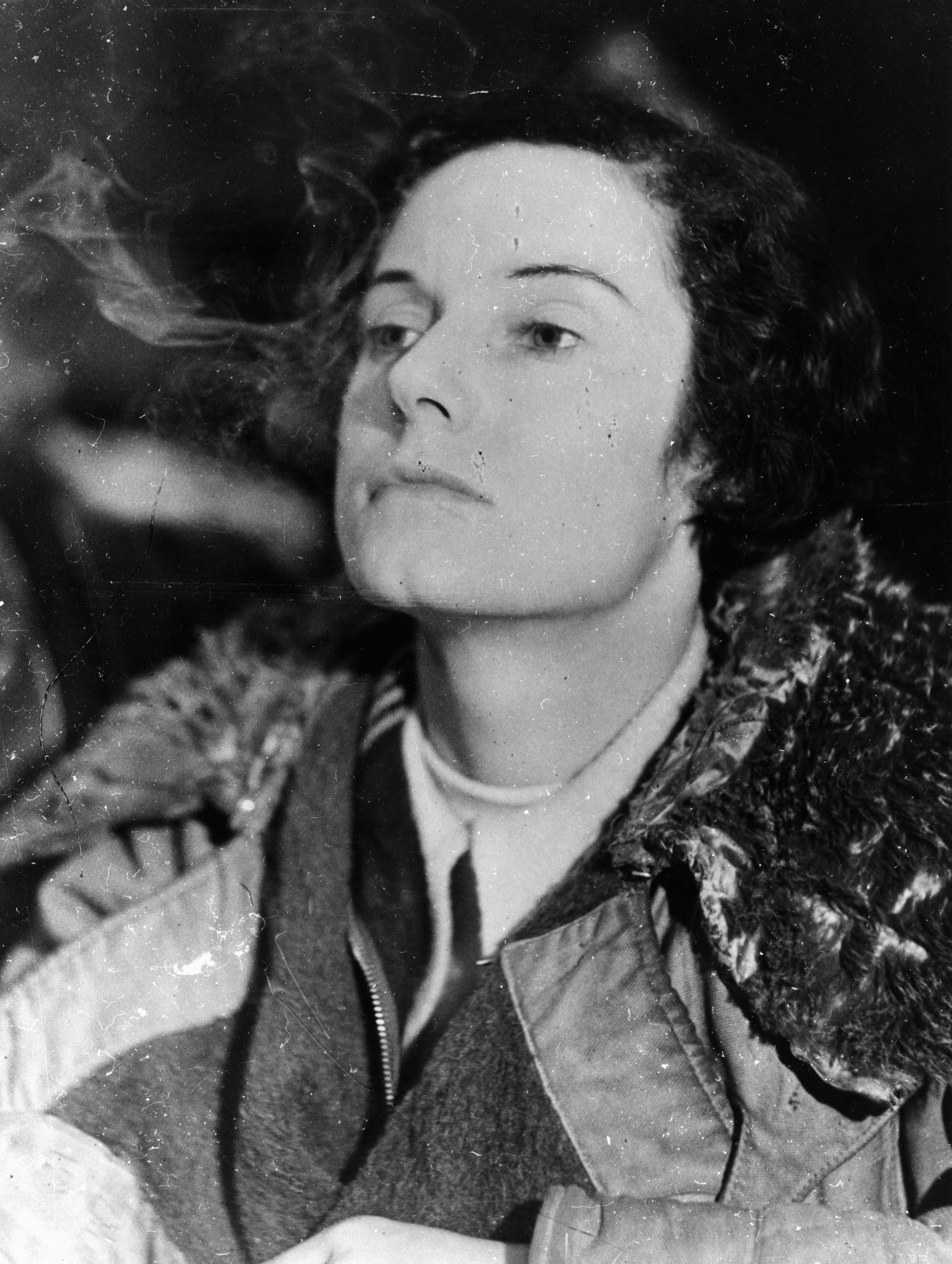
Jean Batten
