= William Stewart (New Zealand politician) =

New Zealand politician (1861–1955)

New Zealand Parliament
Years	Term	Electorate	Party
1915–1917	19th	Bay of Islands	Reform

William Stewart (1861 – 14 December 1955) was a politician of the Reform Party (New Zealand).

He represented the Bay of Islands electorate from 1915 (when he won a by-election after the 1914 election of Vernon Reed was declared void) to 1917, when he resigned.

He was then appointed to the New Zealand Legislative Council for two terms, from 1918 to 1925 and 1925 to 1932.

In 1935, he was awarded the King George V Silver Jubilee Medal.

== Notes ==
New Zealand Parliament
Preceded by Vernon Reed	Member of Parliament for Bay of Islands; 1915–1917	Succeeded by Vernon Reed
