= 1977 Pahiatua by-election =

New Zealand by-election

- 30 April 1977
- Turnout: 14,377 (68.49%)
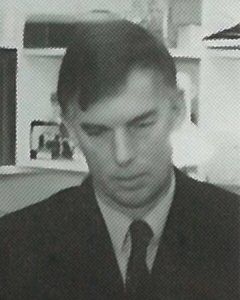

Candidate	John Falloon	Alan Levatt
Party	National	Labour
Popular vote	9,059	4,280
Percentage	63.01	29.77
MP before election
Sir Keith Holyoake
National
Elected MP
John Falloon
National

The Pahiatua by-election of 1977 was a by-election for the electorate of Pahiatua on 30 April 1977 during the 38th New Zealand Parliament.

== Background ==
The by-election resulted from the resignation of the previous member Sir Keith Holyoake when he was appointed Governor-General.

== Candidates ==
Labour

The Labour Party had seven candidates including:

- Trevor de Cleene, a Palmerston North City Councillor and Labour's candidate for Pahiatua in 1969
- Dr Alan Levatt, a sociology lecturer at Victoria University
- Paul Thornicroft, Labour's candidate for Pahiatua in 1975

Levatt, who earned his Ph.D. from Michigan University and had previously lectured in American universities, was selected as the candidate.

National

Five candidates were shortlisted for the National nomination.

- Graham Percy Adam, a company director and former Mayor of Eketāhuna
- Garth Cassidy, a managing director from Waipukurau and member of the Hawkes Bay Harbour Board
- John Falloon, a farmer from Masterton and the meat and wool chairman for the Wairarapa branch of Federated Farmers
- Hamish Kynoch, a farmer from Ashley Clinton and runner-up for Young Farmer of the Year in 1972
- Weston Macpherson, a farmer and chairman of the Norsewood branch of Federated Farmers.

At a selection meeting in the Pahiatua Town Hall four ballots were taken of National members. Kynoch was initially the frontrunner to win the nomination and lead the voting until the final ballot which selected Falloon as the candidate.

Values

The Values Party selected Peter McHugh as its candidate. McHugh, a secondary school from Hastings, had stood as the Values candidate for Pahiatua in 1975.

== Results ==
The following table gives the election results:

1977 Pahiatua by-election
Party	Candidate	Votes	%	±%
National	John Falloon	9,059	63.01	
Labour	Allan Levett	4,280	29.77	
Social Credit	Graeme Hislop	844	5.87	−3.89
Values	Peter McHugh	194	1.35	−2.18
Majority		4,779	33.24	
Turnout		14,377	68.49	−16.12
Registered electors		20,993		
National hold		Swing		
