= John Falloon =

New Zealand politician

The Honourable John Falloon CNZM
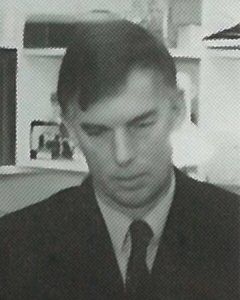
- Falloon in 1992

Member of the New Zealand Parliament for Pahiatua
- In office 1977–1996
- Preceded by: Keith Holyoake

Personal details
- Born: John Howard Falloon; 17 February 1942 Masterton, New Zealand
- Died: 4 October 2005 (aged 63) Bideford, New Zealand
- Party: National
- Spouse: Phillipa "Peeps" Falloon
- Education: Massey University
- Occupation: Farmer

John Howard Falloon CNZM (17 February 1942 – 4 October 2005) was a New Zealand politician. He was an MP from 1977 to 1996, representing the National Party in the Pahiatua electorate.

== Early life and family ==
Falloon was born in Masterton on 17 February 1942, the son of Margaret Falloon (née Woodhead) and Douglas John Falloon. He was educated at Lindisfarne College and Massey University, graduating with a diploma in sheep farm management.

Falloon had three children with his wife Philippa. His cousin, Ian Falloon, was one of the first psychiatrists to have family involved in the treatment of schizophrenia.

== Member of Parliament ==
New Zealand Parliament
Years	Term	Electorate	Party
1977–1978	38th	Pahiatua	National
1978–1981	39th	Pahiatua	National
1981–1984	40th	Pahiatua	National
1984–1987	41st	Pahiatua	National
1987–1990	42nd	Pahiatua	National
1990–1993	43rd	Pahiatua	National
1993–1996	44th	Pahiatua	National

He was first elected to Parliament in the Pahiatua by-election of 1977, replacing Sir Keith Holyoake who had been appointed Governor-General. He retained his seat until he retired.

He held a number of ministerial posts, first in the government of Robert Muldoon, including Postmaster-General, Minister of Statistics, Minister in charge of the Inland Revenue Department and Associate Minister of Finance.

In the government of Jim Bolger, Falloon had posts including Minister of Agriculture, Minister for Forestry, Minister of Friendly Societies, and was the first Minister of Racing.

== Honours and awards ==
In 1990, Falloon was awarded the New Zealand 1990 Commemoration Medal. In the 1997 New Year Honours, Falloon was appointed a Companion of the New Zealand Order of Merit, for public services.

== Later life ==
After resigning from Parliament at the 1996 election, Falloon worked with at-risk children and pursued business interests, such as becoming chairman of Wairarapa winery Lintz Estate.

He had been ill for several weeks after undergoing surgery in Wellington Hospital for a brain tumour and died at his home in Bideford, near Masterton, New Zealand, in 2005.

Political offices
Preceded by Jim Sutton	Minister for Forestry; 1990–1996	Succeeded by Lockwood Smith
Preceded by Warren Cooper	Postmaster-General; 1981–1982	Succeeded by Rob Talbot
New Zealand Parliament
Preceded by Keith Holyoake	Member of Parliament for Pahiatua; 1977–1996	Constituency abolished
