= Charles Wilson (New Zealand Reform Party politician) =

New Zealand politician (1862–1934)

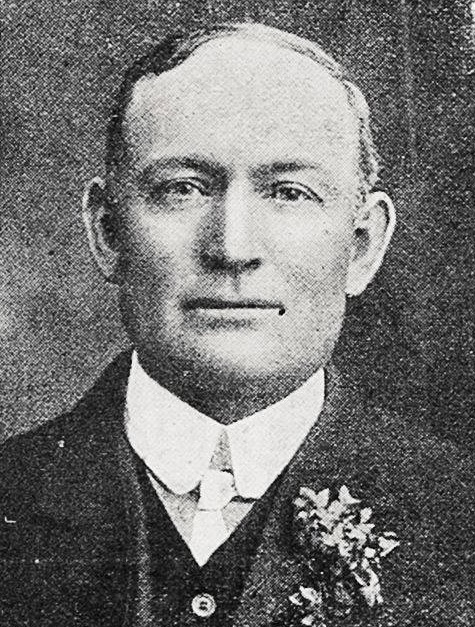

Member of the New Zealand Parliament for Taumarunui
- In office 7 December 1911 – 10 December 1914
- Preceded by: William Jennings
- Succeeded by: William Jennings

Personal details
- Born: 1862 Sydney, Australia
- Died: 19 November 1934 (aged 71–72) Te Kuiti, New Zealand
- Party: Reform
- Spouse: Helen Wilson (m. 1892)
- Occupation: Farmer

Charles Kendall Wilson (1862 – 19 November 1934) was a Reform Party Member of Parliament in New Zealand.

== Biography ==
=== Early life and career ===
Wilson was born in Sydney, Australia and came to New Zealand aged 16 with his parents. He farmed at Levin then he was the West Coast manager for Abraham, and Williams Ltd for 18 years. He then moved to the King Country in 1910 where he returned to farming in Piopio.

=== Political career ===
New Zealand Parliament
Years	Term	Electorate	Party
1911–1914	18th	Taumarunui	Reform

He was elected to the Taumarunui electorate in the 1911 general election, but was defeated in 1914 by Liberal William Thomas Jennings. On 14 May 1915 Jennings' election was declared void. Wilson contested the electorate in the subsequent by-election, but was unsuccessful. At the 1919 general election he stood as an Independent Reform candidate in the Waitomo electorate. He finished second, beaten by Jennings again.

=== Later life and death ===
He died in 1934 . His widow Helen Wilson wrote a highly regarded autobiography in which she recalls the bidding by the liquor trade for him to vote against or even just abstain on a 1910 bill which provided that only a 55-45 percent majority of the vote would be needed to bring in Prohibition. The Trade offered to pay his election expenses, and rose to expenses plus eight hundred pounds, but then they found cheaper support. She said: my husband was incorruptible.

New Zealand Parliament
Preceded by William Jennings	Member of Parliament for Taumarunui; 1911–1914	Succeeded by William Jennings
