= James Elliott (medical administrator) =

New Zealand doctor, editor, medical administrator and writer

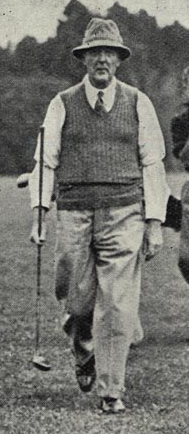
Elliott in 1937

Lieutenant Colonel Sir James Sands Elliott GCStJ VD (28 May 1880 – 26 October 1959) was a New Zealand doctor, editor, medical administrator and writer. He was born in Randalstown, County Antrim, Ireland (now Northern Ireland), on 28 May 1880. He was educated at Wellington College and spent a year at the University of Otago Medical School. His father sent him to the University of Edinburgh to complete his medical course.

As a senior student he served with the medical corps in the Second Boer War from 1899 to 1902.

Graduating MB ChB in 1902, Elliott returned to New Zealand the following year and was the first house surgeon at Wellington Hospital. He then began a surgical and general practice at the hospital, serving also as honorary surgeon. On 12 December 1905, at Wellington, he was married by his father to Annie Allan Forbes from Edinburgh; they were going to have five children.

In 1912, Elliott took the Edinburgh MD degree. In 1914, he wrote a book on Greek and Roman medicine.

In World War I, Elliott was a lieutenant colonel in the New Zealand Medical Corps (NZMC), and was CMO on the second and third voyages of the New Zealand Hospital Ship Maheno; which he described as "like an oven" as she was designed for the Tasman not the Mediterranean. He caused a stir by sending a telegram to the Defence Department, asking whether the Maheno's captain was subordinate to him. The reply was that the captain had the final say.

Elliott became a fellow of the American College of Surgeons in 1926, and in the following year, a foundation fellow of the College of Surgeons of Australasia. In the 1936 King's Birthday Honours, he was appointed a Knight Bachelor, for public services. Elliott was involved with the Order of St John (chartered 1888), and in 1955, was promoted to Bailiff Grand Cross of the Order of St John.

In 1965, a stained-glass window of St Luke (the patron saint of surgeons) was installed in Elliott's memory in the Nurses' Memorial Chapel at Wellington Hospital. It was designed by Martin Roestenburg and donated by Elliott's three sons.
