= David Seath =

New Zealand politician (1914–1997)

The Honourable David Seath
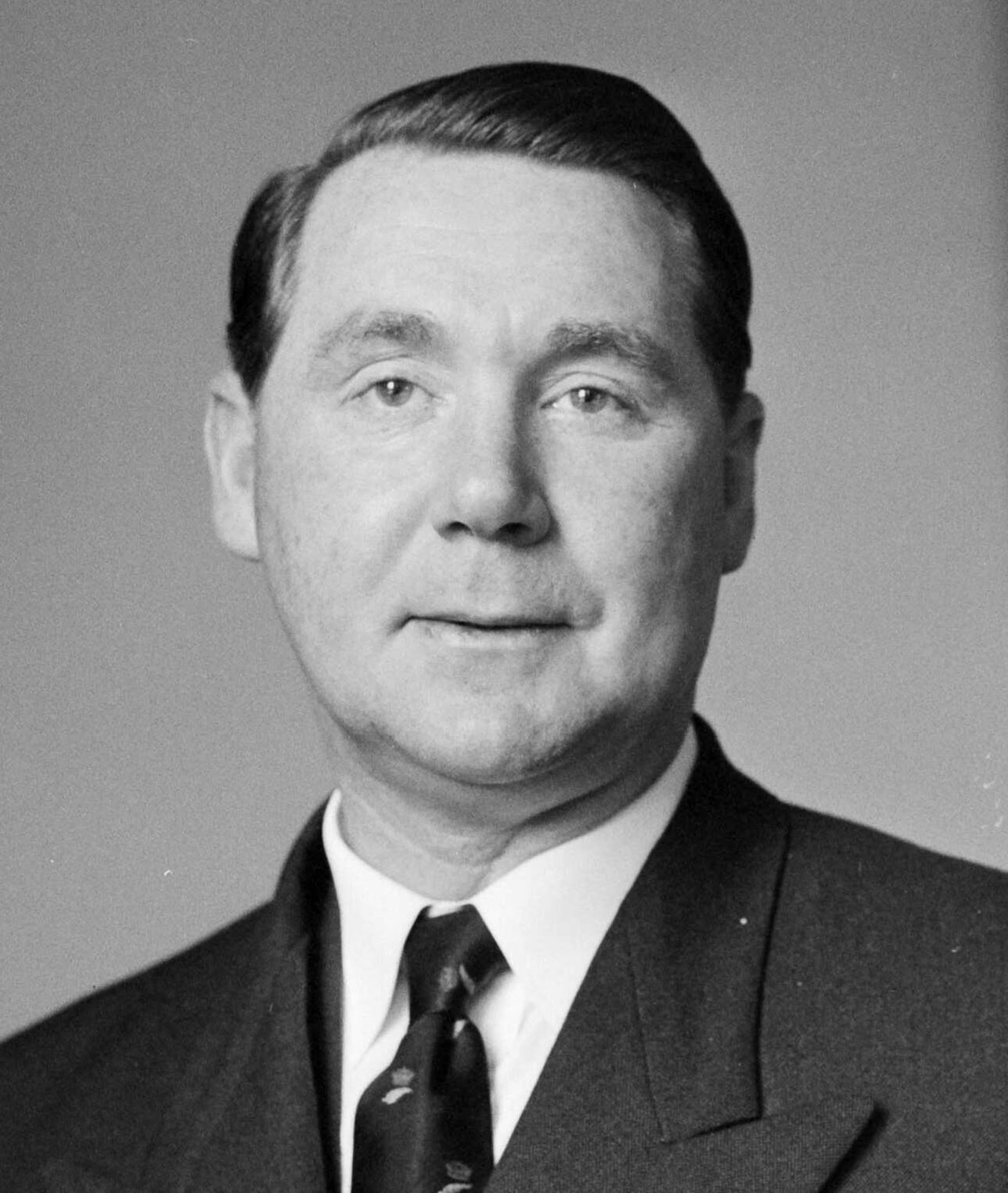
- Seath in 1959

Member of Parliament for Waitomo
- In office 1954–1972
- Preceded by: Walter Broadfoot
- Succeeded by: Constituency abolished

11th Mayor of Taumarunui
- In office 1953–1955
- Preceded by: Douglas Hamilton Hall
- Succeeded by: Frank Douglas House

Personal details
- Born: David Coutts Seath; 31 March 1914 Musselburgh, Scotland
- Died: 18 October 1997 (aged 83) Taumarunui, New Zealand
- Party: National Party
- Education: University of Edinburgh

David Coutts Seath (31 March 1914 – 18 October 1997) was a New Zealand politician of the National Party.

== Biography ==
Seath was born in Musselburgh, Scotland. He received his education at Waihi District High School, Waihi School of Mines, and the University of Edinburgh. From 1937, he was a public accountant in Taumarunui. During World War II, he was with the Royal New Zealand Naval Volunteer Reserve (RNZNVR), and served as a lieutenant commander with British naval forces.

== Career ==
New Zealand Parliament
Years	Term	Electorate	Party
1954–1957	31st	Waitomo	National
1957–1960	32nd	Waitomo	National
1960–1963	33rd	Waitomo	National
1963–1966	34th	Waitomo	National
1966–1969	35th	Waitomo	National
1969–1972	36th	Waitomo	National

He was the mayor of Taumarunui from 1953 to 1955. He was elected in the Waitomo electorate in the 1954 election, following the retirement of National Party colleague Walter Broadfoot. In 1960 Seath was appointed as Parliamentary Under-Secretary to the Minister of Finance, and held that position from 12 December 1960 to 24 January 1962.

In 1963 Seath was appointed Minister of Internal Affairs, and held the position from 20 December 1963 to 9 February 1972, when the Marshall Ministry replaced the second Holyoake Ministry. He was described as "a nervous man easily frightened by Holyoake".

He was a Member of the Executive Council (initially as an undersecretary) from 24 January 1962 to 9 February 1972. In 1972 Seath was granted the right to retain the title of Honourable for life.

He retired at the 1972 election, and died in Taumarunui in October 1997.

== Notes ==
New Zealand Parliament
Preceded by Walter Broadfoot	Member of Parliament for Waitomo; 1954–1972	Constituency abolished
