= 1925 Birthday Honours (New Zealand) =

Awards list for New Zealand

The 1925 King's Birthday Honours in New Zealand, celebrating the official birthday of King George V, were appointments made by the King on the recommendation of the New Zealand government to various orders and honours to reward and highlight good works by New Zealanders. They were announced on 3 June 1925.

The recipients of honours are displayed here as they were styled before their new honour.

== Knight Bachelor ==
- The Honourable John Henry Hosking KC – lately judge of the Supreme Court.
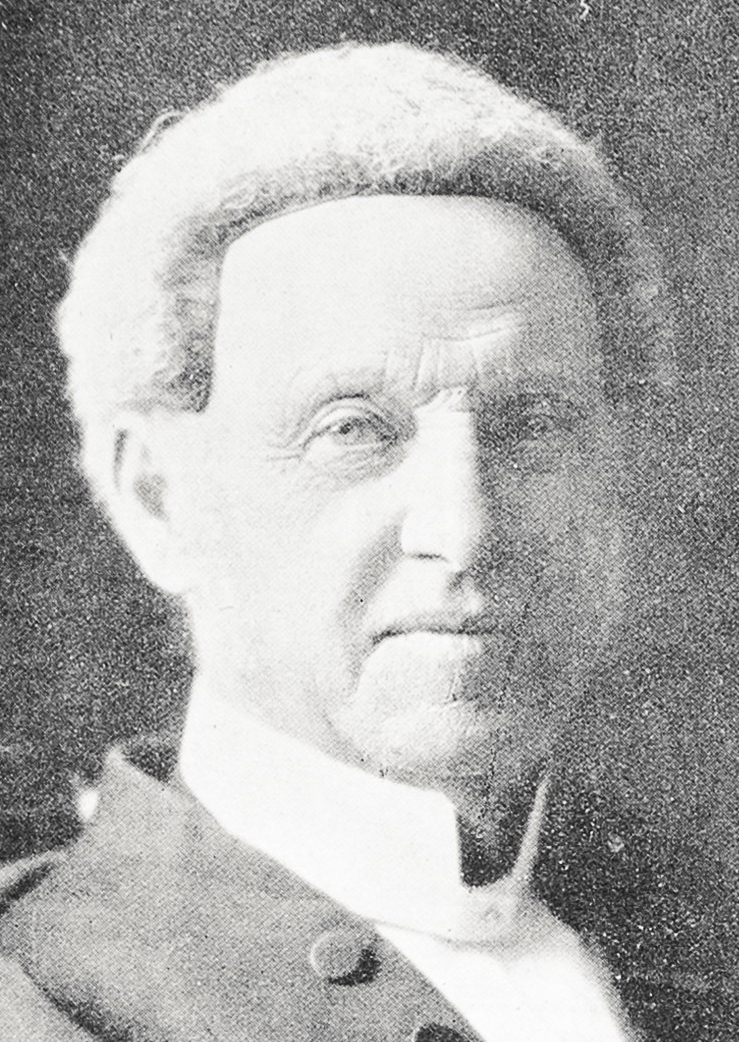
Sir John Hosking

== Order of Saint Michael and Saint George ==
=== Companion (CMG) ===
- Albert Cecil Day CBE – official secretary to the governor-general.
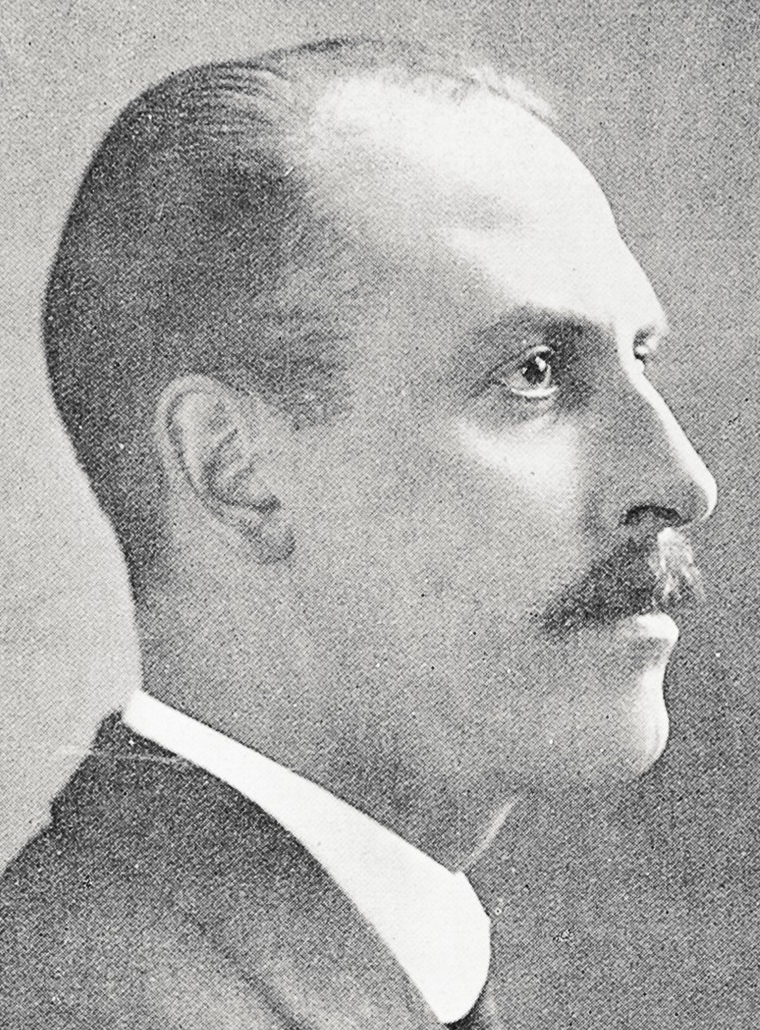
Cecil Day

== Order of the British Empire ==
=== Knight Commander (KBE) ===
Civil division

- Major-General George Spafford Richardson CB CMG CBE – administrator of Western Samoa.
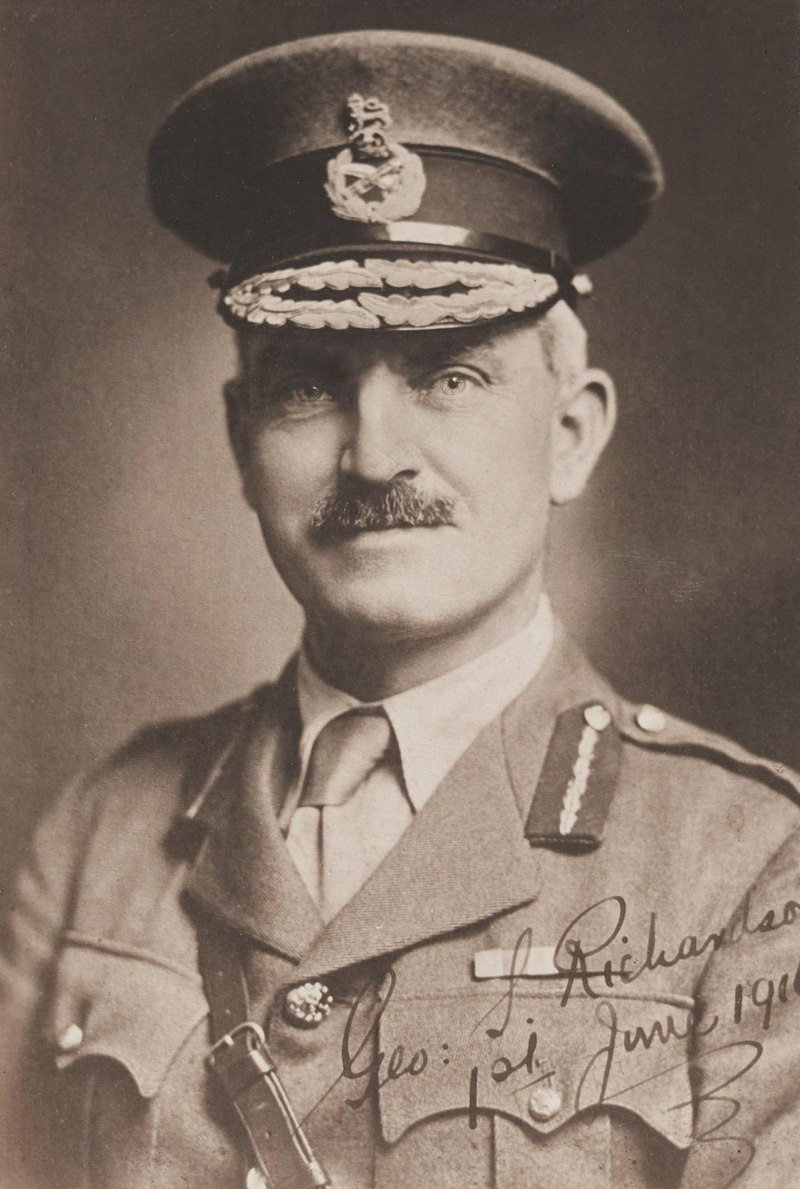
Sir George Richardson
