= Helen Wilson (writer) =

New Zealand teacher, farmer, community leader and writer

Helen Mary Wilson OBE (née Ostler; 4 May 1869 – 16 April 1957) was a New Zealand teacher, farmer, community leader and writer. She was born in Oamaru, New Zealand, in 1869.

== Political life ==
Wilson was active in the Women's Division of the Farmer's Union and one of the early Dominion presidents. She founded the Piopio branch of the organisation in 1927, and in the 1937 Coronation Honours, she was appointed an Officer of the Order of the British Empire, in recognition of her service as Dominion president of the Women's Division.

Interviewed for a radio program during the 1950s, Wilson recalled the process involved for women in New Zealand in obtaining the right to vote and also discussed the Married Women's Property Act.

== Books ==
Wilson was the author of several books, including the autobiography My First Eighty Years. This book is regarded as a New Zealand classic.

== Personal life ==
Wilson spent several years in the North Island town of Levin with her mother, prominent businesswoman and women's suffrage campaigner Emma Ostler. Helen Wilson married politician Charles Kendall Wilson on 16 May 1892. She lived for most of her adult life in Piopio in the Waitomo district of the North Island. She moved to Hamilton in 1942.
