= Walter Broadfoot =

New Zealand politician

The Honourable Sir Walter Broadfoot KBE
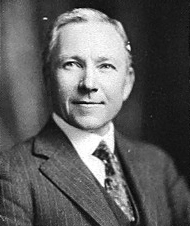

34th Postmaster-General of New Zealand
- In office 13 December 1949 – 26 November 1954
- Prime Minister: Sidney Holland
- Preceded by: Fred Hackett
- Succeeded by: Tom Shand

Member of the New Zealand Parliament for Waitomo
- In office 14 November 1928 – 5 October 1954
- Preceded by: John Rolleston
- Succeeded by: David Seath

Personal details
- Born: 6 April 1881 Lower Hutt, New Zealand
- Died: 10 September 1965 (aged 84)
- Party: United; National
- Profession: Solicitor

Sir Walter James Broadfoot KBE (6 April 1881 – 10 September 1965) was a New Zealand politician of the United Party, and from 1936, the National Party. He was a cabinet minister from 1949 to 1954 in the First National Government.

== Biography ==
=== Early life ===
Broadfoot was born in 1881 at Lower Hutt. He received his education at Wellesley Street Public School and Kihikihi School. His first employment was with the Auckland Post Office as a messenger, and this was followed by work as a journalist for the New Zealand Observer. At night, he studied towards a law degree, which led to employment as a clerk in Hamilton in 1907, followed by setting up his own practice in rural Waikato's Te Kūiti in the following year. He specialised in native affairs and land problems. He married Dorothy Caroline Metcalfe (1884–1945), daughter of Henry Hulbert Metcalfe at St. Mary's Cathedral, Parnell, on 20 December 1910. They had two daughters, Beverley and Merron.

=== Political career ===
New Zealand Parliament
| Years | Term | Electorate | Party |
|---|---|---|---|
| 1928–1931 | 23rd | Waitomo | United |
| 1931–1935 | 24th | Waitomo | United |
| 1935–1936 | 25th | Waitomo | United |
| 1936–1938 | Changed allegiance to: | | National |
| 1938–1943 | 26th | Waitomo | National |
| 1943–1946 | 27th | Waitomo | National |
| 1943–1946 | 27th | Waitomo | National |
| 1946–1949 | 28th | Waitomo | National |
| 1949–1951 | 29th | Waitomo | National |
| 1951–1954 | 30th | Waitomo | National |

From 1923 to 1935, he was first deputy mayor and then mayor of Te Kuiti. He was first elected to Parliament in the 1928 election as a member of the United Party, when he defeated Reform's John Rolleston in the Waitomo electorate. On 23 April 1936, he became junior party whip during the United/Reform Coalition, just prior to the formation of the National Party resulting from the merger of the Reform and United Parties in mid-May. He became senior whip in 1941, and held that position until 1949, when he became Postmaster-General.

In 1942, he was Minister of National Service in the short-lived War Administration. In the First National Government, he was Postmaster-General and Minister of Telegraphs (1949–1954). He retired from Parliament in 1954.

In 1935, he was awarded the King George V Silver Jubilee Medal. In 1953, he was awarded the Queen Elizabeth II Coronation Medal. In 1955, Broadfoot was granted the use of the title of "Honourable" for life, having served more than three years as a member of the Executive Council. He was appointed a Knight Commander of the Order of the British Empire in the 1955 Queen's Birthday Honours, and died in 1965.

== Notes ==
Political offices
| Preceded by Fred Hackett | Postmaster-General and Minister of Telegraphs; 1949–1954 | Succeeded by Tom Shand |
New Zealand Parliament
| Preceded by John Rolleston | Member of Parliament for Waitomo; 1928–1954 | Succeeded by David Seath |
