= 1913 New Zealand Liberal Party leadership election =

- 11 September 1913
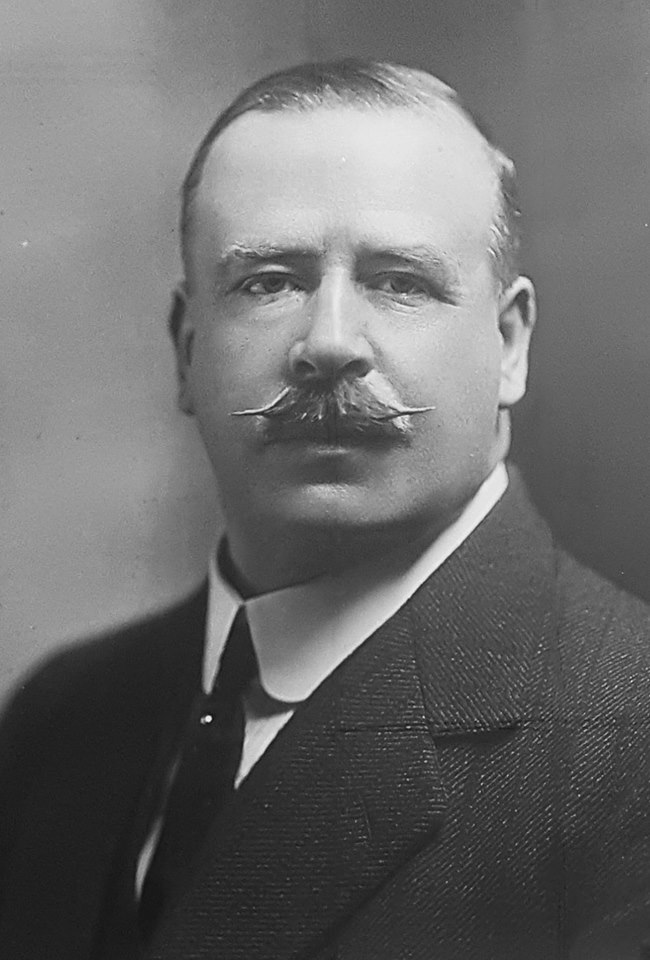
Candidate	Joseph Ward
Popular vote	elected unopposed
Leader before election
Thomas Mackenzie
Leader after election
Joseph Ward

The New Zealand Liberal Party leadership election 1913 was held on 11 September to choose the next leader of the New Zealand Liberal Party. The election was won by Awarua MP and former party leader Joseph Ward.

== Background ==
Thomas Mackenzie had won the Liberal leadership upon Joseph Ward's resignation in 1912, though his new ministry lasted only months. Meanwhile, Ward had visited Australia before returning to Wellington, taking a back bench in Parliament, many thinking his political career to be all but over. Even after William Massey's Reform Party had defeated MacKenzie's administration in a no-confidence vote in July 1912, Ward had refused to assume the Liberal Party's leadership again.

== Candidates ==
=== Joseph Ward ===
Ward had been a Member of Parliament since 1887 and had been a part of the cabinets of both John Ballance and Richard Seddon. Most still saw Ward as Seddon's natural heir. Of the remaining members of the Liberal caucus, he was the most well-known to the public and as such, his profile resulted in many Liberals desiring him to return to lead the party in the hopes of winning back office. Ward however, was still reluctant to resume leadership of the Liberal's again despite a growing public nostalgia for his leadership of the liberals.

== Result ==
As Ward was the only officially nominated candidate, he was elected as leader unopposed by the caucus. However, Ward struck a hard bargain, and in return for helming the party once more he gained greater personal control over the party, caucus and policy citing a lack of a more central decision making body as a reason for the failure in the 1911 elections. Arguing that nothing short of autocracy could help organise the Liberals in a way as to win back the treasury benches.

== Aftermath ==
Ward would remain the Liberal Party's leader until he lost his seat in the 1919 election. He led them to another election loss in 1914, though re-entered cabinet as Deputy-Prime Minister and Treasurer (along with several other Liberals) in the national wartime cabinet from 1915 to 1919 under William Massey.
