= Bill Jennings (politician) =

New Zealand politician

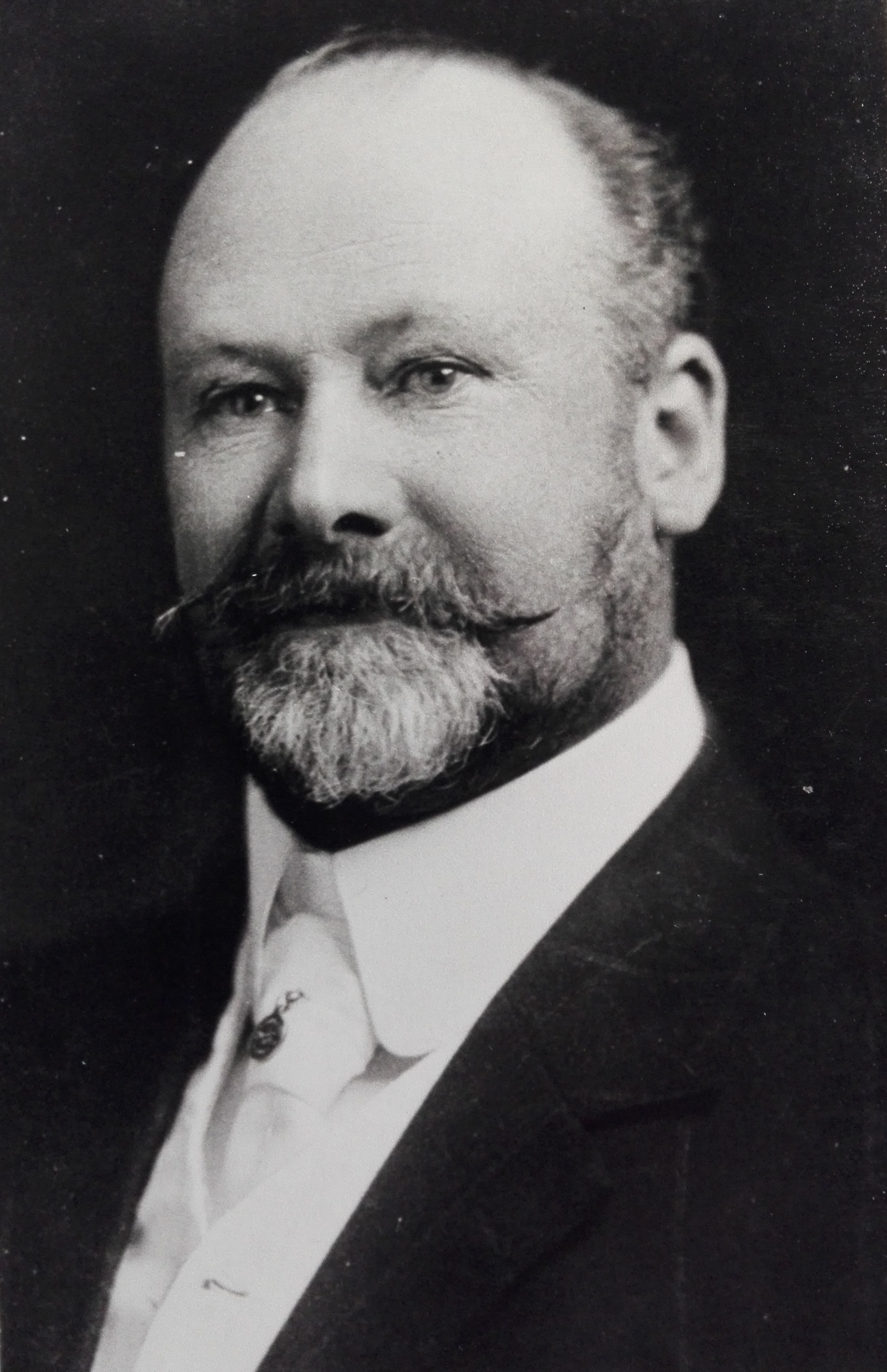

Member of the New Zealand Legislative Council
- In office 15 October 1892 – 23 October 1902
- Appointed by: Richard Seddon

Personal details
- Born: 1854 Auckland, New Zealand
- Died: 6 February 1923 (aged 68–69) Wellington, New Zealand
- Party: Liberal
- Spouse: Dora Mary Jennings Brannigan
- Occupation: Printer

William Thomas Jennings (1854 – 6 February 1923), known as Bill and nicknamed as "The Caveman", was a Liberal Party Member of Parliament in New Zealand.

== Early life ==
He was born in Auckland, where he attended St. Paul's school and subsequently became an apprentice printer in the offices of the New Zealander. Subsequently, he worked for a number of newspapers: the Thames Guardian and the Dunedin Guardian as foreman, then the Dunedin Age and The Oamaru Mail as manager, followed by a move back to Auckland in 1882 to become foreman on the Evening Star.

== Political career ==
New Zealand Parliament
Years	Term	Electorate	Party
1902–1905	15th	Egmont	Liberal
1905–1908	16th	Egmont	Liberal
1908–1911	17th	Taumarunui	Liberal
1914–1915	19th	Taumarunui	Liberal
1915–1919	19th	Taumarunui	Liberal
1919–1922	20th	Waitomo	Liberal

A social reformer, he worked hard to represent men and women of the labouring classes and to improve their conditions. He was called to a seat in the New Zealand Legislative Council on 15 October 1892 as a representative of labour, and was known for his common sense, ability and courtesy. He also worked with the secretary of the New Zealand Tailoresses' Union to improve working conditions for women in that industry. He resigned from the Legislative Council on 23 October 1902, three years into his second term. This change was attributed to him feeling "...that his youth was returning strong upon him, and he ought to be in the Representative House."

He stood for the Liberal Party and won the Egmont electorate in the 1902 general election, and held it to 1908. In 1908 he won the Taumarunui electorate but was defeated in 1911 general election. He won the electorate back in 1914, but on 14 May 1915 the election was declared void. He regained the electorate in the subsequent 1915 by-election and held it to 1919. In 1919 he won the Waitomo electorate but was defeated in 1922 general election.

== Personal life ==
His death in Wellington on 6 February 1923 was reported in The Argus (Melbourne). According to court documents, he died in Wellington but resided in New Plymouth as a widower with 3 surviving sons and 1 daughter. His wife Dora Mary Jennings (née Brannigan) of Tasmania, passed away 2 years prior aged 60, mother of his 6 children. According to their obituaries they had two sons killed during World War I.

== Other positions held ==
He also held the following positions at various times in his life:

- lieutenant in the Hobson Rifle Volunteer Corps
- past district grand president of the order of Druids
- honorary secretary to the Auckland Liberal Association
- chairman of the Auckland Typographical Association

== Notes ==
New Zealand Parliament
Preceded by Walter Symes	Member of Parliament for Egmont; 1902–1908	Succeeded by Bradshaw Dive
New constituency	Member of Parliament for Taumarunui; 1908–1911 1914–1919	Succeeded by Charles Wilson
Preceded by Charles Wilson	Member of Parliament for Taumarunui; 1908–1911 1914–1919	Constituency abolished
New constituency	Member of Parliament for Waitomo; 1919–1922	Succeeded by John Rolleston
