= 1915 Taumarunui by-election =

New Zealand by-election

- 15 June 1915
- Turnout: 7,655 (83.41%)
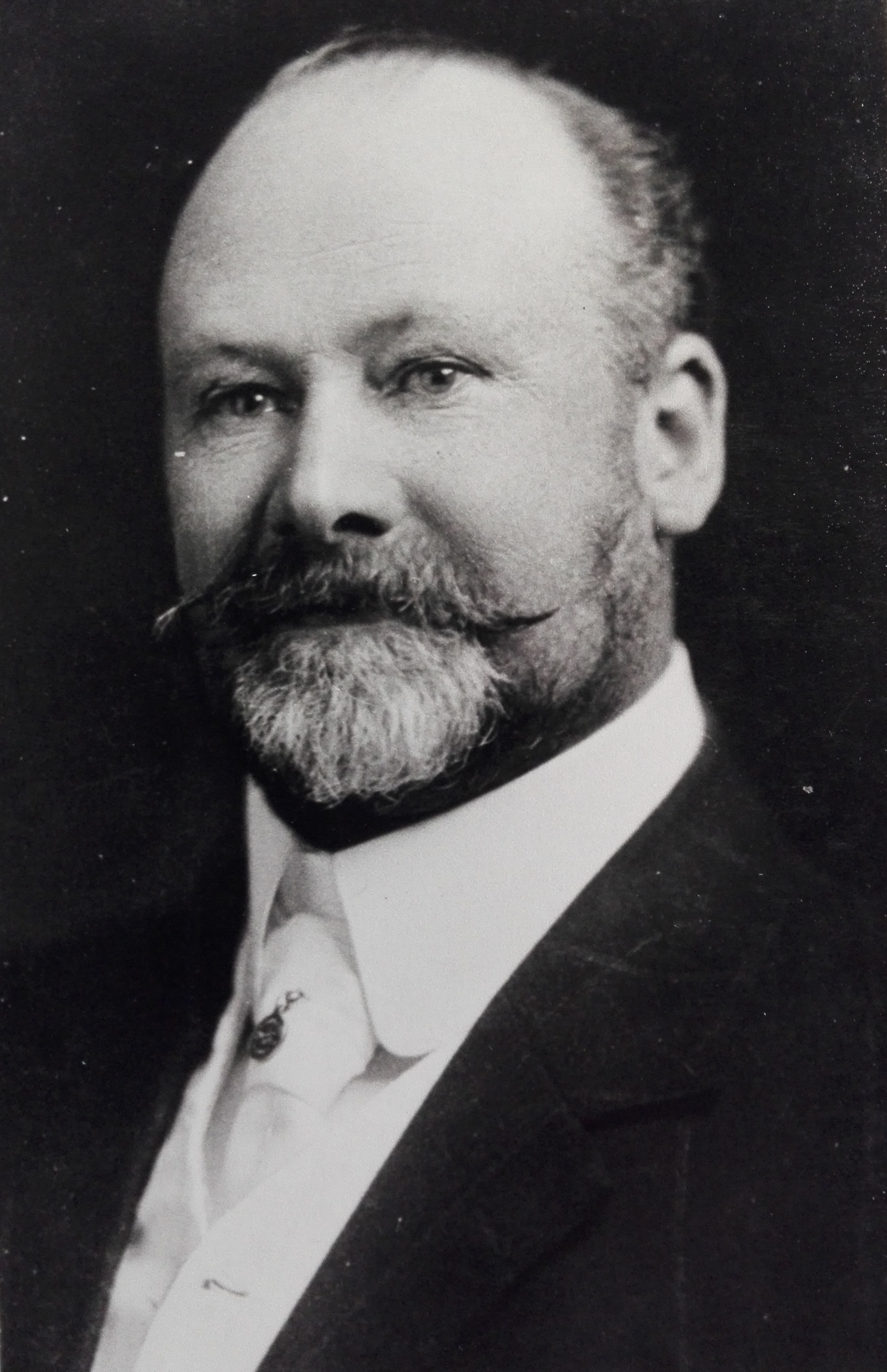

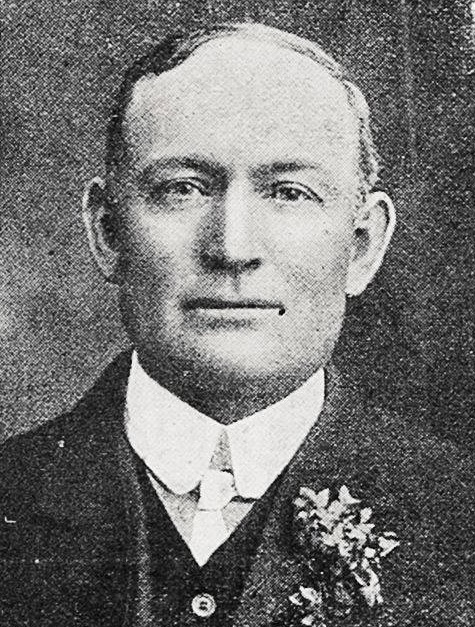
Candidate	Bill Jennings	Charles Wilson
Party	Liberal	Reform
Popular vote	3,899	3,741
Percentage	50.93%	48.87%
Member before election
Bill Jennings
Liberal
Elected Member
Bill Jennings
Liberal

The Taumarunui by-election of 1915 was a by-election during the 18th New Zealand Parliament in the Taumarunui electorate. It was held on the 15 June 1915. The seat had become vacant in May 1915 when incumbent Taumarunui MP's Bill Jennings' election the previous year was declared void. Jennings stood again and successfully retained his seat.

== Background ==
Following many close results at the 1914 general election, combined with the fact that the security of the Government hung on them, the Reform Party filed for a record number of electoral petitions. Reform was particularly disappointed by their losses in Taumarunui and Hawkes Bay to the Liberal Party, the petitions launched in those seats alleged irregularities. It was discovered that William Jennings had been wrongly enrolled on the Taumarunui electoral roll rather than Taranaki. Liberal leader Sir Joseph Ward campaigned energetically in the seat in support of Jennings.

== Results ==
The following table gives the election results:

1915 Taumarunui by-election
Party	Candidate	Votes	%	±%
Liberal	William Jennings	3,899	50.93	−0.13
Reform	Charles Wilson	3,741	48.87	+0.42
Informal votes		15	0.19	−0.58
Majority		158	2.06	−0.54
Turnout		7,655	83.41	+1.66
Registered electors		9,418		
