= Pahiatua (electorate) =

Pahiatua is a former New Zealand parliamentary electorate in the Wairarapa region. It existed from 1896 to 1996, and was represented by nine Members of Parliament, including Prime Minister Keith Holyoake for 34 years.

== Population centres ==
In the 1896 electoral redistribution, rapid population growth in the North Island required the transfer of three seats from the South Island to the north. Four electorates that previously existed were re-established, and three electorates were established for the first time, including Pahiatua. The original area of the Pahiatua electorate included the towns of Pahiatua and Woodville. Over time, the electorate shifted slightly north, until the town of Dannevirke was covered following the 1918 electoral redistribution.

The 1946 electoral redistribution took the abolition of the country quota into account, and as a rural electorate, the area covered by the Pahiatua electorate increased significantly. The Masterton electorate to the south was abolished, and its area distributed to the Wairarapa and Pahiatua electorate. Eketāhuna and Castlepoint were gained by the electorate in that process.

== History ==
The Pahiatua electorate existed from 1896 to 1996. Early holders of the seat were John O'Meara from 1896 to 1904, Bill Hawkins from 1904 to 1905, Bob Ross from 1905 to 1911, James Escott from 1911 to 1916, Harold Smith from 1916 to 1919, Archibald McNicol from 1919 to 1922, and Alfred Ransom from 1922 to 1943.

The seat was held by Prime Minister Keith Holyoake from 1943 until 1977, when he resigned to become Governor-General. He was succeeded by John Falloon, who chose to retire in 1996 when the seat was abolished.

=== Members of Parliament ===
Key

Liberal Liberal–Labour Reform United National

Election	Winner
1896 election	John O'Meara
1899 election	John O'Meara
1902 election	John O'Meara
1904 by-election	Bill Hawkins
1905 election	Bob Ross
1908 election	Bob Ross
1911 election	James Escott
1914 election	James Escott
1916 by-election	Harold Smith
1919 election	Archibald McNicol
1922 election	Alfred Ransom
1925 election	Alfred Ransom
1928 election	Alfred Ransom
1931 election	Alfred Ransom
1935 election	Alfred Ransom
1938 election	Alfred Ransom
1943 election	Keith Holyoake
1946 election	Keith Holyoake
1949 election	Keith Holyoake
1951 election	Keith Holyoake
1954 election	Keith Holyoake
1957 election	Keith Holyoake
1960 election	Keith Holyoake
1963 election	Keith Holyoake
1966 election	Keith Holyoake
1969 election	Keith Holyoake
1972 election	Keith Holyoake
1975 election	Keith Holyoake
1977 by-election	John Falloon
1978 election	John Falloon
1981 election	John Falloon
1984 election	John Falloon
1987 election	John Falloon
1990 election	John Falloon
1993 election	John Falloon
(Electorate abolished in 1996; see Wairarapa)

== Election results ==
=== 1977 by-election ===
1977 Pahiatua by-election
Party	Candidate	Votes	%	±%
National	John Falloon	9,059	63.01	
Labour	Allan Levett	4,280	29.77	
Social Credit	Graeme Hislop	844	5.87	−3.89
Values	Peter McHugh	194	1.35	−2.18
Majority		4,779	33.24	
Turnout		14,377	68.49	−16.12
Registered electors		20,993		
National hold		Swing		

=== 1975 election ===
1975 general election: Pahiatua
Party	Candidate	Votes	%	±%
National	Keith Holyoake	10,423	64.19	+4.08
Labour	Paul Thornicroft	3,654	22.50	
Social Credit	Graeme Hislop	1,585	9.76	
Values	Peter McHugh	574	3.53	
Majority		6,769	41.69	+12.00
Turnout		16,236	84.61	−1.39
Registered electors		19,188		

=== 1972 election ===
1972 general election: Pahiatua
Party	Candidate	Votes	%	±%
National	Keith Holyoake	8,825	60.11	−2.15
Labour	L J Cairns	4,466	30.42	
Social Credit	J H Morrow	1,022	6.96	
Liberal Reform	R E Cheer	253	1.72	
New Democratic	J W Duffy	115	0.78	
Majority		4,359	29.69	−4.30
Turnout		14,681	86.00	+0.75
Registered electors		17,069		

=== 1969 election ===
1969 general election: Pahiatua
Party	Candidate	Votes	%	±%
National	Keith Holyoake	9,010	62.26	+0.51
Labour	Trevor de Cleene	4,090	28.26	
Social Credit	Douglas Conway	1,131	7.81	
Country Party	C K R Farnsworth	240	1.65	
Majority		4,920	33.99	−7.29
Turnout		14,471	86.75	+0.86
Registered electors		16,681		

=== 1966 election ===
1966 general election: Pahiatua
Party	Candidate	Votes	%	±%
National	Keith Holyoake	7,914	61.75	−3.95
Labour	F M O'Brien	2,623	20.46	
Social Credit	J H Morrow	2,207	17.22	
Independent	R E Cheer	71	0.55	
Majority		5,291	41.28	−0.39
Turnout		12,815	85.89	−3.03
Registered electors		14,919		

=== 1963 election ===
1963 general election: Pahiatua
Party	Candidate	Votes	%	±%
National	Keith Holyoake	9,039	65.70	+1.26
Labour	Ernie Hemmingsen	3,306	24.03	
Social Credit	Oliver Marks	1,411	10.25	
Majority		5,733	41.67	+2.47
Turnout		13,756	88.92	−1.26
Registered electors		15,469		

=== 1960 election ===
1960 general election: Pahiatua
Party	Candidate	Votes	%	±%
National	Keith Holyoake	8,111	64.44	+2.41
Labour	Kingsley McKane	3,177	25.24	
Social Credit	Percival John Dempsey	1,298	10.31	
Majority		4,934	39.20	+8.32
Turnout		12,586	90.18	−2.39
Registered electors		13,955		

=== 1957 election ===
1957 general election: Pahiatua
Party	Candidate	Votes	%	±%
National	Keith Holyoake	8,075	62.03	+0.22
Labour	William Erle Rose	4,055	31.15	
Social Credit	Roy Gunn	887	6.81	
Majority		4,020	30.88	+1.06
Turnout		13,017	92.57	1.84
Registered electors		14,061		

=== 1954 election ===
1954 general election: Pahiatua
Party	Candidate	Votes	%	±%
National	Keith Holyoake	7,293	61.81	+0.92
Labour	Ronald Bell	3,774	31.98	
Social Credit	Maurice Mulloy Whimp	731	6.19	
Majority		3,519	29.82	−3.15
Turnout		11,798	90.73	+1.92
Registered electors		13,003		

=== 1951 election ===
1951 general election: Pahiatua
Party	Candidate	Votes	%	±%
National	Keith Holyoake	8,490	60.89	−6.68
Labour	Owen Jones	3,892	27.91	
Majority		4,598	32.97	−2.18
Turnout		12,382	88.81	−3.45
Registered electors		13,942		

=== 1949 election ===
1949 general election: Pahiatua
Party	Candidate	Votes	%	±%
National	Keith Holyoake	8,663	67.57	+3.51
Labour	George Patrick O'Leary	4,156	32.43	
Majority		4,507	35.15	−7.03
Turnout		12,819	92.26	−1.82
Registered electors		13,894		

=== 1946 election ===
1946 general election: Pahiatua
Party	Candidate	Votes	%	±%
National	Keith Holyoake	8,422	64.06	+6.13
Labour	Otto Ernest Niederer	4,725	35.94	
Majority		3,697	28.12	+9.59
Turnout		13,147	94.08	+1.54
Registered electors		13,973		

=== 1943 election ===
1943 general election: Pahiatua
Party	Candidate	Votes	%	±%
National	Keith Holyoake	5,705	57.93	
Labour	George Anders Hansen	3,880	39.39	
Democratic Labour	Edward Ellis	190	1.92	
Informal votes		73	0.74	
Majority		1,825	18.53	
Turnout		9,848	95.62	
Registered electors		10,299		

=== 1928 election ===
1928 general election: Pahiatua
Party	Candidate	Votes	%	±%
United	Alfred Ransom	4,369	52.32	
Reform	Harold Smith	3,447	41.28	
Labour	Joseph Whittle	535	6.41	
Majority		922	11.04	
Informal votes		94	1.11	
Turnout		8,445	90.97	
Registered electors		9,283		

=== 1916 by-election ===
1916 Pahiatua by-election
Party	Candidate	Votes	%	±%
Reform	Harold Smith	1,521	47.57	
Liberal	Robert Ross	1,438	44.97	
Labour	George McFarlane	238	7.44	
Majority		83	2.59	
Turnout		3,197	51.23	
Registered electors		6,241		
Reform hold		Swing		

=== 1904 by-election ===
1904 Pahiatua by-election
Party	Candidate	Votes	%	±%
Independent Liberal	Bill Hawkins	1,418	41.74	
Liberal	Lindsay Buick	1,323	38.94	
Conservative	Samuel Bolton	476	14.01	−27.40
Liberal	David Crewe	138	4.06	
Independent	Donald Munro	14	0.42	
Informal votes		28	0.82	
Majority		95	2.79	
Turnout		3,397	79.16	+2.88
Registered electors		4,291		

=== 1899 election ===
1899 general election: Pahiatua
Party	Candidate	Votes	%	±%
Liberal	John O'Meara	2,058	54.92	+23.31
Conservative	Harold Smith	1,689	45.08	
Majority		369	9.85	+8.90
Turnout		3,747	83.25	
Registered electors		4,501		

=== 1896 election ===
1896 general election: Pahiatua
Party	Candidate	Votes	%	±%
Liberal	John O'Meara	1,004	31.61	
Conservative	Robert Manisty	974	30.67	
Liberal	William Wilson McCardle	848	26.70	
Independent Liberal	James Taylor	233	7.34	
Conservative	George Whitcombe	117	3.68	
Majority		30	0.94	
Informal votes				
Registered electors		4,125		
Turnout				
