= Bill Hawkins (cricketer) =

New Zealand politician and cricketer (1861–1930)

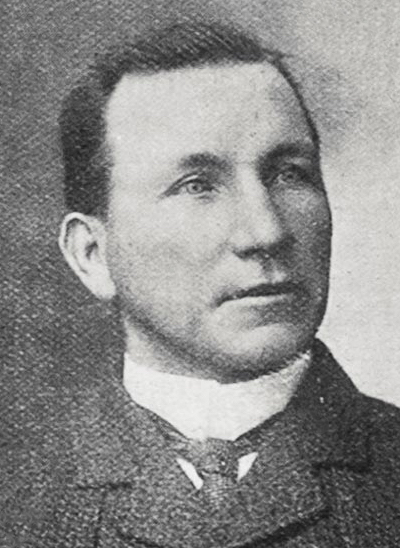

Member of the New Zealand Parliament for Pahiatua
- In office 1904–1905
- Preceded by: John O'Meara
- Succeeded by: Bob Ross

Personal details
- Born: William Henry Hawkins; 1861 Rylstone, New South Wales, Australia
- Died: 10 August 1930 (aged 68) New Plymouth, New Zealand
- Cricket career

Cricket information
- Bowling: Left-arm fast-medium
- Role: Wicket-keeper

Domestic team information
- Years: Team
- 1886/87–1896/97: Auckland
- 1887/88–1894/95: Hawke's Bay

Career statistics
Competition	First-class
Matches	17
Runs scored	91
Batting average	4.33
100s/50s	0/0
Top score	20
Balls bowled	568
Wickets	13
Bowling average	19.00
5 wickets in innings	0
10 wickets in match	0
Best bowling	3/11
Catches/stumpings	13/4
- Source: CricketArchive, 26 August 2020

William Henry Hawkins (1861 – 10 August 1930) was a New Zealand cricketer and Liberal Party Member of Parliament.

== Work ==
Hawkins was born in New South Wales and moved to the Wairarapa at the age of 20 to take up journalism. He eventually became editor and manager of the Pahiatua Herald. After losing his parliamentary seat he moved to Tataraimaka in Taranaki, where he took up farming.

== Cricket ==
Hawkins played 17 first-class matches for Auckland and Hawke's Bay between 1887 and 1896. He was a wicket-keeper who also sometimes bowled left-arm medium pace. He captained Hawke's Bay in their match against Wellington in 1887–88.

== Politics ==
New Zealand Parliament
Years	Term	Electorate	Party
1904–1905	15th	Pahiatua	Independent Liberal

Hawkins won the Pahiatua electorate in a 1904 by-election after the death of John O'Meara; but was defeated in the next election in 1905. At the 1914 general election he stood in the Stratford seat as the official Liberal Party candidate. He was defeated by the incumbent MP John Bird Hine.

In World War I he served overseas in the 14th Reinforcement with the rank of captain. On his return he joined the staff of the prohibitionist organisation the New Zealand Alliance.

== Death ==
Hawkins died in New Plymouth on 10 August 1930, and he was buried at Te Henui Cemetery. He was survived by his wife, whom he had married in 1894, and their four sons and a daughter.
