= Taumarunui (electorate) =

Taumarunui was a parliamentary electorate in the King Country in the Manawatū-Whanganui region of New Zealand from 1908 to 1919. The electorate was represented by two Members of Parliament.

== Population centres ==
In the 1907 electoral redistribution, a major change that had to be allowed for was a reduction of the tolerance to ±750 to those electorates where the country quota applied. The North Island had once again a higher population growth than the South Island, and three seats were transferred from south to north. In the resulting boundary distribution, every existing electorate was affected, and three electorates were established for the first time, including the Taumarunui electorate. These changes took effect with the 1908 election.

The initial area covered by the Taumarunui electorate was quite large. Settlements that were initially included were Taumarunui, Tūrangi, Ohakune, Waiouru, Pipiriki, Raetihi, Ōhura, Waitara, Mōkau, Awakino, Kawhia, Ōtorohanga, and Te Kūiti. In the 1911 electoral redistribution, large areas went to adjacent electorates, and Ohakune, Waiouru, Pipiriki, and Raetihi went to the Waimarino electorate, while Kawhia went to the Waikato electorate.

In the 1918 electoral redistribution, the Taumarunui electorate was abolished, and the vast majority of its area went to the Waitomo and Waimarino electorates.

== History ==
Bill Jennings of the Liberal Party was the first representative from 1908 to 1911. In the 1911 election, Jennings was defeated by the Reform Party member Charles Wilson. Jennings had won the electorate back in 1914, but on 14 May 1915, the election was declared void. Jennings won the electorate in the subsequent 1915 by-election and held it to 1919.

=== Members of Parliament ===
The electorate was represented by two Members of Parliament:

Key

Liberal Reform

Election	Winner
1908 election	Bill Jennings
1911 election	Charles Wilson
1914 election	Bill Jennings
1915 by-election	Bill Jennings
(Electorate abolished in 1919; see Waitomo and Waimarino)

== Election results ==
=== 1915 by-election ===
1915 Taumarunui by-election
Party	Candidate	Votes	%	±%
Liberal	William Jennings	3,899	50.93	−0.13
Reform	Charles Wilson	3,741	48.87	+0.42
Informal votes		15	0.19	−0.58
Majority		158	2.06	−0.54
Turnout		7,655	83.41	+1.66
Registered electors		9,418		
