= Waitomo (electorate) =

Waitomo was a parliamentary electorate in the Waikato region and the King Country of New Zealand, from 1919 to 1972. The electorate was represented by four Members of Parliament.

== Population centres ==
In the 1918 electoral redistribution, the North Island gained a further three electorates from the South Island due to faster population growth. Only two existing electorates were unaltered, five electorates were abolished, two former electorate were re-established, and three electorates, including Waitomo, were created for the first time. The Taumarunui electorate was abolished through the 1918 electoral redistribution, and the vast majority of the Waitomo electorate's area had previously been in the Taumarunui electorate. Settlements that fell within the initial area of the Waitomo electorate were Ōtorohanga, Te Kūiti, Ōhura, Awakino, Mōkau, and Waitara.

== History ==
The Waitomo electorate was first established for the 1919 election. The first representative was Bill Jennings of the Liberal Party. John Rolleston of the Reform Party defeated the incumbent by 3447 to 3441 votes, a majority of only six votes. Rolleston in turn was defeated in 1928 by Walter Broadfoot of the United Party. Broadfoot joined the National Party in 1936 when it formed through the amalgamation of the United and Reform Parties. He remained the electorate's representative until the 1954 election, when he retired.

Broadfoot was succeeded by David Seath of the National Party, who represented the electorate until the 1972 election, when he retired. In the same year, the Waitomo electorate was abolished.

=== Members of Parliament ===
The Waitomo electorate was represented by four Members of Parliament:

Key

Liberal	Reform	United	National

Election	Winner
1919 election	Bill Jennings
1922 election	John Rolleston
1925 election	John Rolleston
1928 election	Walter Broadfoot
1931 election	Walter Broadfoot
1935 election	Walter Broadfoot
1938 election	Walter Broadfoot
1943 election	Walter Broadfoot
1946 election	Walter Broadfoot
1949 election	Walter Broadfoot
1951 election	Walter Broadfoot
1954 election	David Seath
1957 election	David Seath
1960 election	David Seath
1963 election	David Seath
1966 election	David Seath
1969 election	David Seath
(Electorate abolished 1972; see King Country)

== Election results ==
=== 1935 election ===
1935 general election: Waitomo
Party	Candidate	Votes	%	±%
United	Walter Broadfoot	4,521	45.86	
Labour	Jack Jones	2,995	30.38	
Country Party	J H Penniket	2,341	23.74	
Informal votes		65	0.65	
Majority		1,526	15.49	
Turnout		9,857	91.08	
Registered electors		10,822		

=== 1928 election ===
1928 general election: Waitomo
Party	Candidate	Votes	%	±%
United	Walter Broadfoot	3,797	48.99	
Reform	John Rolleston	3,265	42.13	
Labour	Charles Croall	688	8.88	
Majority		532	6.86	
Informal votes		52	0.67	
Turnout		7,802	87.28	
Registered electors		8,939		
