= Frank Moore (political activist) =

New Zealand political activist

Francis (Frank) Thomas Moore (19 May 1867 – 17 November 1940) was a New Zealand political activist.

== Education ==
Frank Moore attended Wellington College where he was dux.

== Political activity ==
Born in Porirua near Wellington, New Zealand on 19 May 1867, Moore was Secretary of the Meat Trade Workers' Federation that was destroyed in the 1890 strike. He was appointed manager of the Wellington Meat Export Company at Ngauranga in 1892 and was an active supporter of the Liberal Party during the 1890s. In 1901, Moore was employed by Premier Richard Seddon to prepare a report on the freezing industry for the New Zealand Government.

Frank Moore became Chairman of the Johnsonville Town Board in 1905 and was a member of the Hutt County Council. He joined the Wellington Socialist Party in 1907 and was an independent Socialist candidate for Wellington Suburbs in the 1908 general election. Moore was the Labour Party candidate for the same electorate in 1911 and 1914.

== Banishment from New Zealand ==
Frank T. Moore threatened the Prime Minister in 1902 during a political dispute and as such as sentenced by a judge to 3 years exile from New Zealand. Frank Moore was sent to Australia by ship in 1902 whereby he promptly returned to New Zealand by ship in 1902 and petitioned the Governor General to overturn/commute the sentence. He was subsequently elected to the Johnsonville Town Board in 1905.

Source: Parliamentary Debates, Volume 122, New Zealand, Parliament (1902) - New Zealand.

== Publishing activity ==
Frank Moore was a man of intellectual ability and a reputable academic scholar and as such authored over 50 published works. The most notable of his works are held in the JC Beaglehole Room in the Library of Victoria University in Wellington. The list of works are as follows

Book - Essays on burning political questions : state banking and paper money, Moore, Frank Thomas.; 1910

Book - Armageddon and a soldier in khaki, Moore, Frank Thomas.; 1918

Book - New Zealand's centennial wonder book : God's own system of credit, currency and banking : the free distribution of the world's wealth for the world's people, Moore, F. T. (Frank Thomas), 1867–1951.; 1940

Book - The new Palestine and the new idealist, Moore, F. T. (Frank Thomas), 1867–1951.; c1900
