= John Reed (judge) =

New Zealand judge

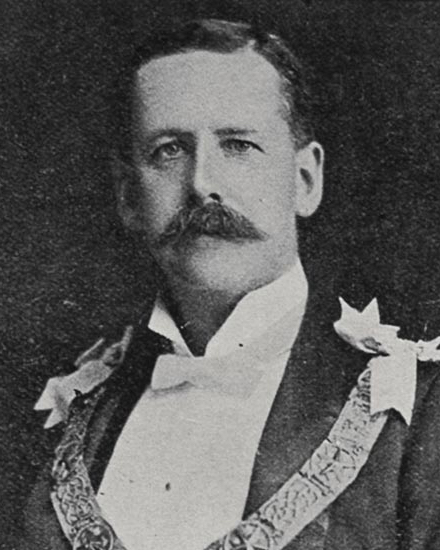
Reed in 1907

Sir John Ranken Reed CBE KC (26 December 1864 – 22 April 1955) was a New Zealand judge.

Reed was the eldest son of George McCullagh Reed, a newspaper proprietor, and Jessie Chalmers Reed (née Ranken). He was born in Ipswich, Queensland, where his father had moved to in 1861 to be the Presbyterian minister. His brother was Vernon Reed. He received his education at Auckland Grammar School, Dunedin High School, Victoria College, Jersey, and Clare College in the University of Cambridge, England. He served his articles with Devore and Cooper in Auckland and was admitted as a barrister in June 1887. He had a practice in the Bay of Islands and relocated to Auckland in early 1896, where he joined William Thorne. In 1898, Reed set up his own practice in Auckland. In 1900, he took James Every Stephen Bailey into a partnership under the banner of Reed and Bailey. In 1912, Roland Perceval Towle joined the partnership, and their practice was known as Reed, Bailey and Towle. Bailey retired at the end of 1919 and two of the staff became partners instead, and the practice was then known as Reed, Towle, Hellaby, and Cooper.

For a time, Reed was president of the Auckland Law Society. Outside of the judiciary, Reed had a strong interest in military matters and in 1911, he was appointed Judge Advocate General of the New Zealand Territorial Forces. In November 1912, Reed was appointed King's Counsel. In February 1921, he was appointed judge to the Supreme Court; this was the first of two appointments triggered by the retirement of Justice Chapman and the resignation of Justice Cooper. He retired from his practice at the end of February 1921 but the name did not change as Reed's son, Mervyn Ranken Reed, carried on as one of the partners. Reed was also a prominent Freemason, serving as the Auckland district grand master for seven years.

Reed was appointed a Commander of the Order of the British Empire (military division) in the 1919 King's Birthday Honours. In 1935, he was awarded the King George V Silver Jubilee Medal. He was appointed a Knight Bachelor in the 1936 King's Birthday Honours.
