= 1914 New Zealand general election =

General election in New Zealand

- 10 & 11 December 1914

All 80 seats in the New Zealand House of Representatives 41 seats were needed for a majority
- Turnout: 84.7%
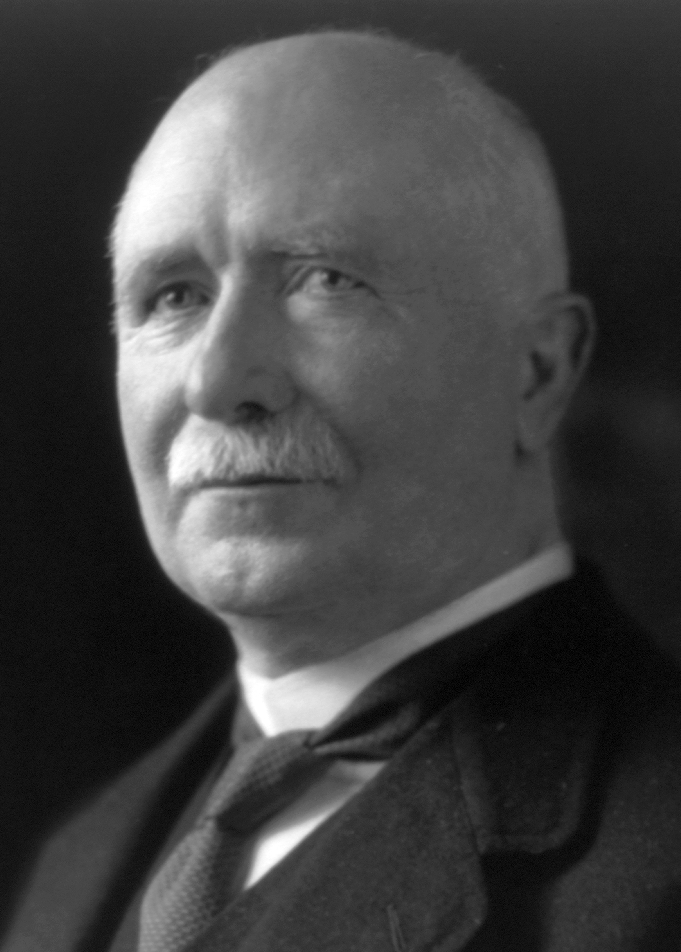

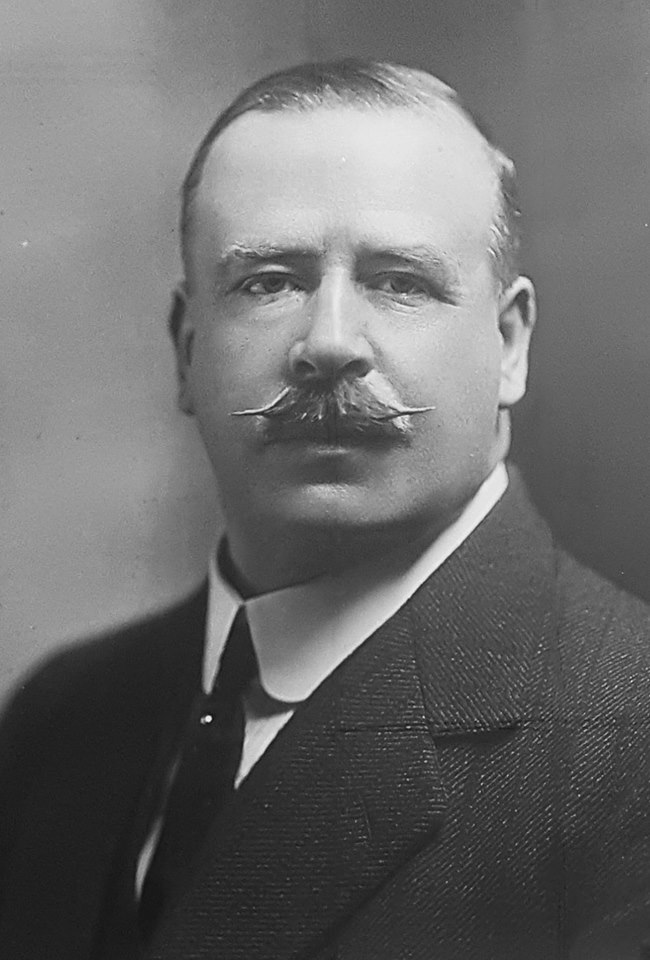

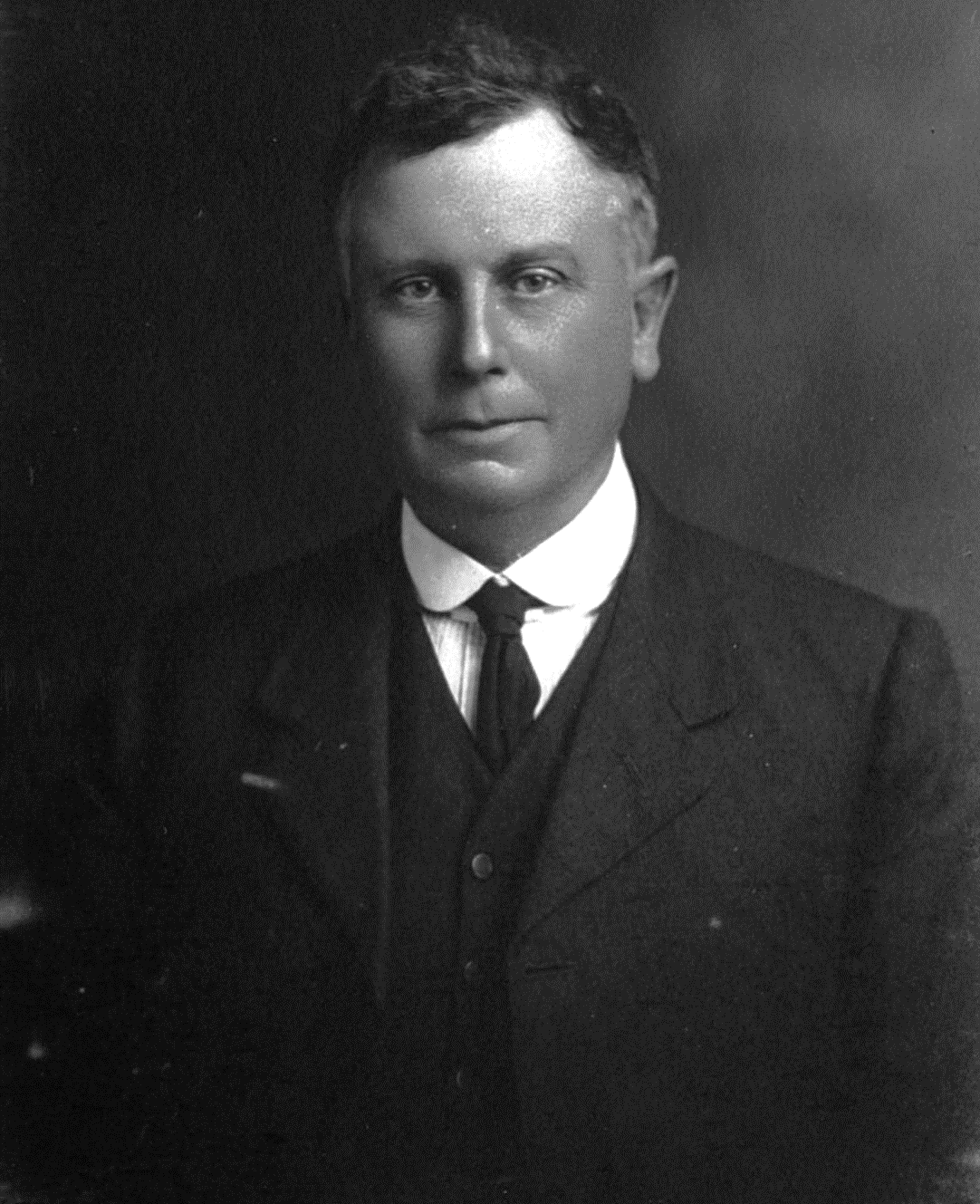

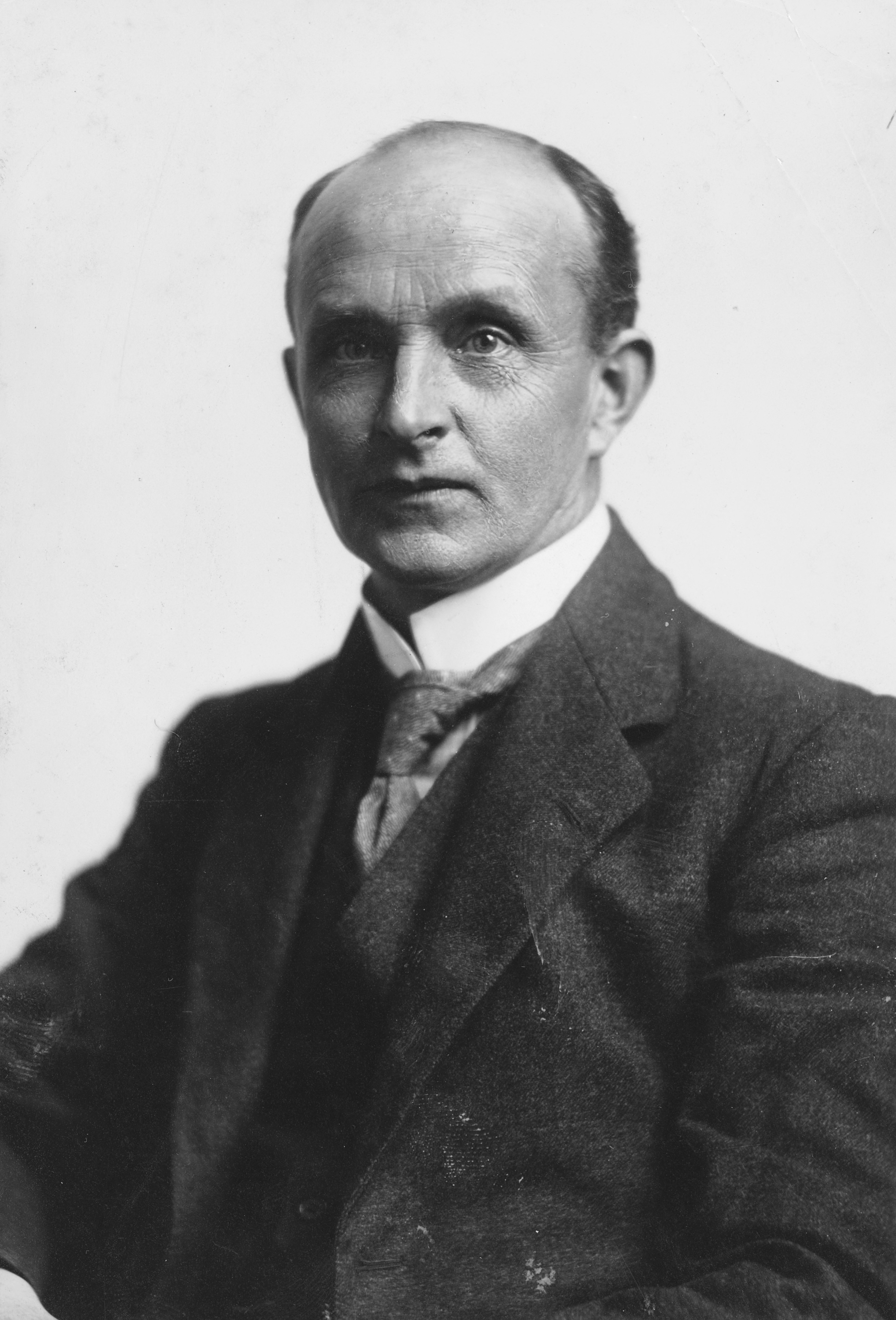
	First party	Second party
Leader	William Massey	Sir Joseph Ward
Party	Reform	Liberal
Leader since	11 February 1909	11 September 1913
Leader's seat	Franklin	Awarua
Last election	38 seats, 33.4%	36 seats, 34.2%
Seats before	41	32
Seats won	40	34
Seat change	▼1	▲2
Popular vote	243,122	222,299
Percentage	47.1%	43.1%
Swing	▲13.7%	▲8.9%
	Third party	Fourth party
Leader	Alfred Hindmarsh	James McCombs
Party	United Labour	Social Democrat
Leader since	7 April 1912	Unclear
Leader's seat	Wellington South	Lyttelton
Last election	Not yet founded	Not yet founded
Seats before	2	3
Seats won	3	2
Seat change	▲1	▼1
Popular vote	22,672	22,500
Percentage	4.2%	4.2%
Swing	▲4.2%	▲4.2%
- Results of the election.
Prime Minister before election
William Massey
Reform
Subsequent Prime Minister
William Massey
Reform

The 1914 New Zealand general election was held on 10 December to elect a total of 80 MPs to the 19th session of the New Zealand Parliament. The Maori vote was held on 11 December. A total number of 616,043 voters were registered, of which 84.7% voters turned out to vote.

The election saw William Massey's Reform Government maintain power.

== Background ==
The second-ballot voting system had been repealed in 1913, and first-past-the-post voting reinstated for the 1914 election. Soldiers serving overseas in the NZEF were given a vote by the Expeditionary Forces Voting Act, 1914. They voted for a party (Liberal, Labour or Reform) and their votes were allocated to a candidate for their electorate by a representative of their party; which sometimes required the representative to choose between rival "Liberal" or "Labour" candidates.

== Summary of results ==
=== Party totals ===
Election results
Party	Candidates	Total votes	Percentage	Seats won
Reform Party	84	243,025	45.47	40
Liberal Party	77	227,706	42.61	34
United Labour	10	22,672	4.24	3
Social Democrat	11	22,500	4.21	2
Independents	12	18,554	3.47	1
Total valid votes		534,457		80
Informal votes		5,618	1.04	
Registered voters		616,043		
Total candidates	193			

- Auckland West, Hawke's Bay, Taumarunui, Wairarapa, Waitaki and Wellington Central were won by the Liberals from Reform
- Chalmers, Dunedin West, Motueka, and Northern Maori were won by Reform from the Liberals
- Nelson was won by Reform from an independent.
- Otaki was won by Reform from the Social Democrats.
- Dunedin North was won by United Labour from Reform
- Four electorates replaced their incumbent MP with another from the same party: Christchurch East and Temuka (Liberal), Eden and Wellington Suburbs and Country (Reform).

=== Votes summary ===
Popular Vote
Reform	46.90%
Liberal	43.10%
United Labour	4.24%
Social Democrat	4.21%
Independents	11.40%

Parliament seats
Reform	50.00%
Liberal	42.50%
United Labour	3.75%
Social Democrat	2.50%
Independents	1.25%

== Results ==
The following are the results of the 1914 general election:

Key

Liberal Reform United Labour Social Democrat Independent Labour Independent

Electorate results for the 1914 New Zealand general election
Electorate	Incumbent	Winner	Majority	Runner up
General electorates
Ashburton	William Nosworthy		157	William Maslin
Auckland Central	Albert Glover		2,302	Michael Joseph Savage
Auckland East	Arthur Myers		2,507	Arthur Holmes
Auckland West	James Bradney	Charles Poole	1,411	James Bradney
Awarua	Sir Joseph Ward		1,226	John Hamilton
Avon	George Russell		1,073	Dan Sullivan
Bay of Islands	Vernon Reed		108	Peter Buck
Bay of Plenty	William MacDonald		965	Kenneth Williams
Bruce	James Allen		693	Charles Smith
Buller	James Colvin		2,195	George Powell
Chalmers	Edward Clark	James Dickson	686	William Mason
Christchurch East	Thomas Davey	Henry Thacker	1,890	Hiram Hunter
Christchurch North	Leonard Isitt		1,217	Henry Toogood
Christchurch South	Harry Ell		2,333	Gains Whiting
Clutha	Alexander Malcolm		1,009	John Jenkinson
Dunedin Central	Charles Statham		12	Jim Munro
Dunedin North	George Thomson	Andrew Walker	322	George Thomson
Dunedin South	Thomas Sidey		2,697	Thomas Dalton
Dunedin West	John A. Millar	William Downie Stewart	345	John Johnson
Eden	John Bollard	James Parr	2,456	William Tuck
Egmont	Charles Wilkinson		894	David Astbury
Ellesmere	Heaton Rhodes		273	James Free
Franklin	William Massey		2,928	Arthur Glass
Gisborne	Sir James Carroll		1,249	Harry de Lautour
Grey	Paddy Webb		980	Henry Michel
Grey Lynn	John Payne		89	Murdoch McLean
Hawke's Bay	Hugh Campbell	Robert McNab	40	Hugh Campbell
Hurunui	George Forbes		1,486	William Banks
Hutt	Thomas Wilford		943	Albert Samuel
Invercargill	Josiah Hanan		1,590	John Lillicrap
Kaiapoi	David Buddo		1,181	David Jones
Kaipara	Gordon Coates		1,118	Richard Hoe
Lyttelton	James McCombs		1,598	Malcolm Miller
Manukau	Frederic Lang		1,224	John McLarin
Marsden	Francis Mander		940	Edmund Purdie
Masterton	George Sykes		193	Alexander Hogg
Mataura	George Anderson		174	William Mehaffey
Motueka	Roderick McKenzie	Richard Hudson	602	Roderick McKenzie
Napier	Vigor Brown		2,215	George William Venables
Nelson	Harry Atmore	Thomas Field	90	Harry Atmore
Oamaru	Ernest Lee		338	Jack MacPherson
Ohinemuri	Hugh Poland		100	Joseph Clark
Oroua	David Guthrie		1,119	John Morrison
Otago Central	Robert Scott		999	William Bodkin
Otaki	John Robertson	William Field	640	John Robertson
Pahiatua	James Escott		683	John Mathews
Palmerston	David Buick		1,109	Jim Thorn
Parnell	James Dickson		1,172	Jeremiah Sullivan
Patea	George Pearce		118	William Morrison
Raglan	Richard Bollard		1,448	William Thompson
Rangitikei	Edward Newman		903	Robert Hornblow
Riccarton	George Witty		1,215	Bertram Bunn
Selwyn	William Dickie		1,227	George Sheat
Stratford	John Hine		637	Bill Hawkins
Taranaki	Henry Okey		201	Daniel Hughes
Taumarunui	Charles Wilson	Bill Jennings	205	Charles Wilson
Tauranga	William Herries		1,992	Ralph Stewart
Temuka	Thomas Buxton	Charles Talbot	407	Charles Kerr
Thames	Thomas Rhodes		515	Edmund Taylor
Timaru	James Craigie		1,110	Frank Smith
Waikato	Alexander Young		2,193	Alexander Scholes
Waimarino	Robbie Smith		1,995	Hugh Speed
Waipawa	George Hunter		138	Albert Jull
Wairarapa	Walther Buchanan	J. T. Marryat Hornsby	60	Walther Buchanan
Wairau	Richard McCallum		369	John Duncan
Waitaki	Francis Smith	John Anstey	156	Norton Francis
Waitemata	Alexander Harris		1,013	Henry Cromwell Tewsley
Wanganui	Bill Veitch		852	Frederick Pirani
Wakatipu	William Fraser		897	Joseph Stephens
Wallace	John Thomson		881	Alexander Rodger
Wellington Central	Frank Fisher	Robert Fletcher	2,329	Frank Fisher
Wellington East	Alfred Newman		48	David McLaren (Note: Labour was narrowly ahead on election night, but after a counting error was discovered, the seat was won by Reform)
Wellington North	Alexander Herdman		2,655	William Turnbull
Wellington South	Alfred Hindmarsh		1,215	John Luke
Wellington Suburbs and Country	William Bell	Robert Wright	1,002	Frank Moore
Westland	Tom Seddon		826	Arthur Paape
Māori electorates
Eastern Maori	Sir Āpirana Ngata		2,825	Hetekia Pere
Northern Maori	Te Rangi Hīroa	Taurekareka Henare	176	Hemi te Paa
Southern Maori	Taare Parata		238	Teone Matapura Erihana
Western Maori	Māui Pōmare	Māui Pōmare	2,107	Hema te Ao

Table footnotes:

== Aftermath ==
There were many close results in dozens of electorates, six were decided by less than 100 votes. The government's majority was precarious for many months and it was particularly disappointed by their losses in Taumarunui and Hawkes Bay to the Liberals. The Reform Party filed a record number of electoral petitions, alleging irregularities. Several by-elections were necessitated on grounds of irregularities in Dunedin Central, Bay of Islands and Taumarunui. The Liberal Party campaigned vigorously to gain Bay of Islands, retain Taumarunui and supported the United Labour Party candidate (Jim Munro) in Dunedin Central. If all results went his way, it was conceivable for Liberal leader, Sir Joseph Ward, to form a minority government with Labour support. Ward even made preparations for a return to power, but the Reform Party managed to hold their two seats and continue in power.

== See also ==
- Politics of New Zealand
- Elections in New Zealand
