= James Escott =

New Zealand politician (1872–1916)

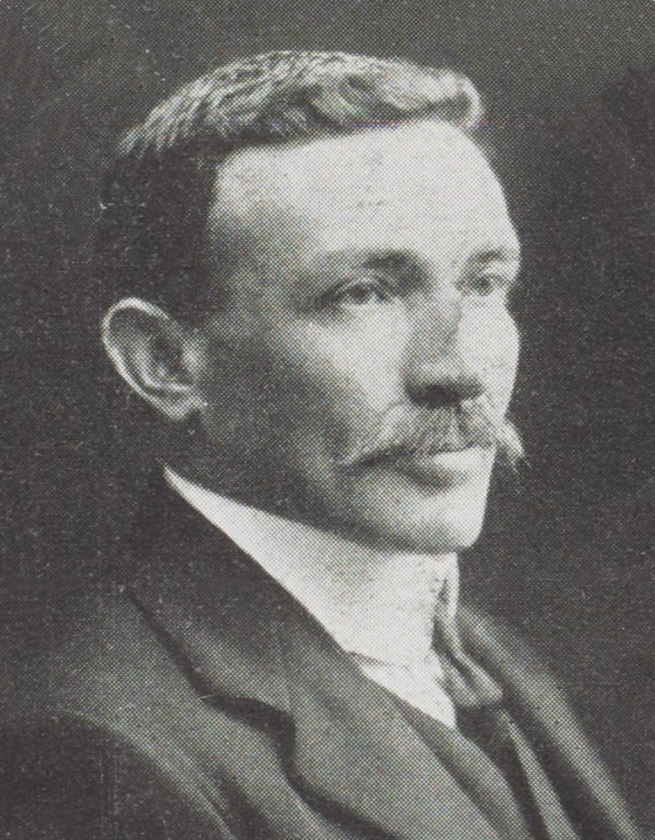
James Escott

New Zealand Parliament
Years	Term	Electorate	Party
1911–1914	18th	Pahiatua	Reform
1914–1916	19th	Pahiatua	Reform

James Henry Escott (17 April 1872 – 28 July 1916) was a Reform Party Member of Parliament in New Zealand.

Escott was born in Orepuki and moved to Woodville when he was 18. He fought in the Boer War.

He won the Pahiatua electorate in 1911, and held it until he died in 1916. He had been planning to join the fight in World War I before his illness and death.
