= John Hosking (judge) =

New Zealand judge (1854–1928)

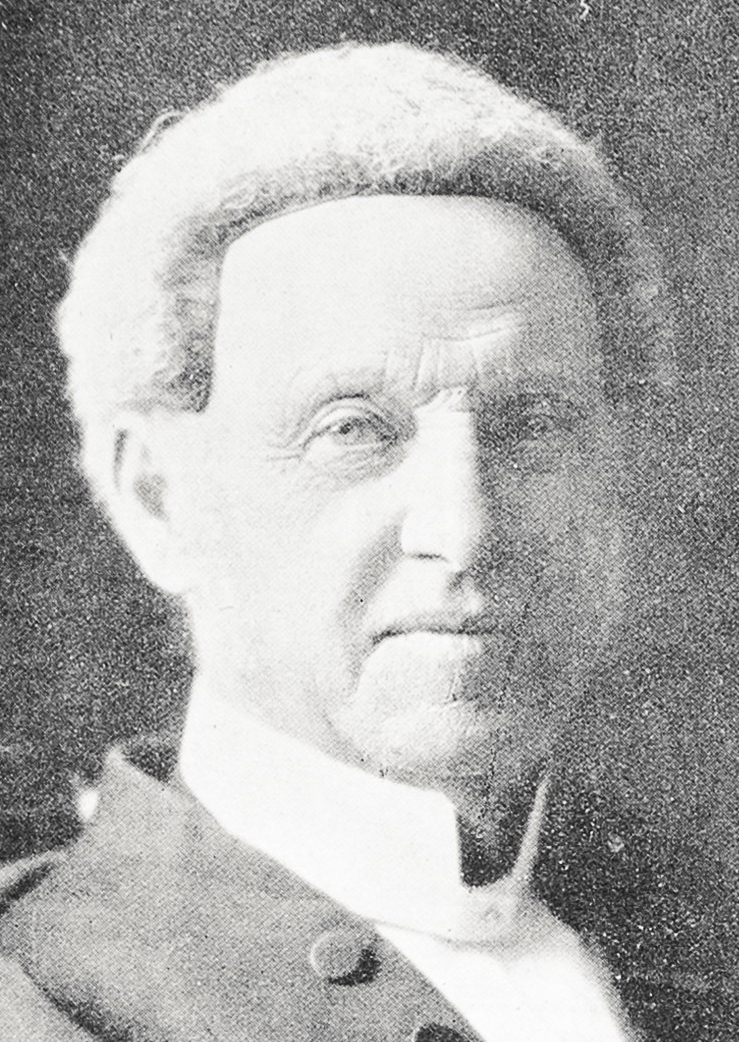
John Hosking

Sir John Henry Hosking KC (1854 – 30 May 1928) was a judge of the New Zealand Supreme Court.

== Biography ==
Hosking was born in Penzance, Cornwall, England, in 1854. He emigrated to New Zealand with his family on the Rock City when he was one year old, arriving in Auckland on 6 June 1855. Hosking received his education in Auckland and at age 16, he was articled to Samuel Jackson. He passed his qualifications in 1875 and went to Dunedin, where he first worked for E. P. Kenyon, and from 1877 to 1898 was a partner in the firm Kenyon and Hosking. After Kenyon moved to England, Hosking managed the firm by himself.

On the advice of Saul Solomon, a Dunedin lawyer, he became a barrister.

When the office of King's Counsel was established in New Zealand in 1907, he was part of the first intake. In 1914, he was appointed judge to the Supreme Court. He retired from the bench in 1925, and retired to Wadestown. In the 1925 King's Birthday Honours, Hosking was appointed a Knight Bachelor. He died on 30 May 1928, survived by his wife, two sons, and one daughter. He was interred at Karori Cemetery.
