= 17th New Zealand Parliament =

Term of the Parliament of New Zealand

17th Parliament of New Zealand
←	16th Parliament	18th Parliament	→

Overview
- Legislative body: New Zealand Parliament
- Term: 10 June 1909 – 28 October 1911
- Election: 1908 New Zealand general election
- Government: Liberal Government

House of Representatives
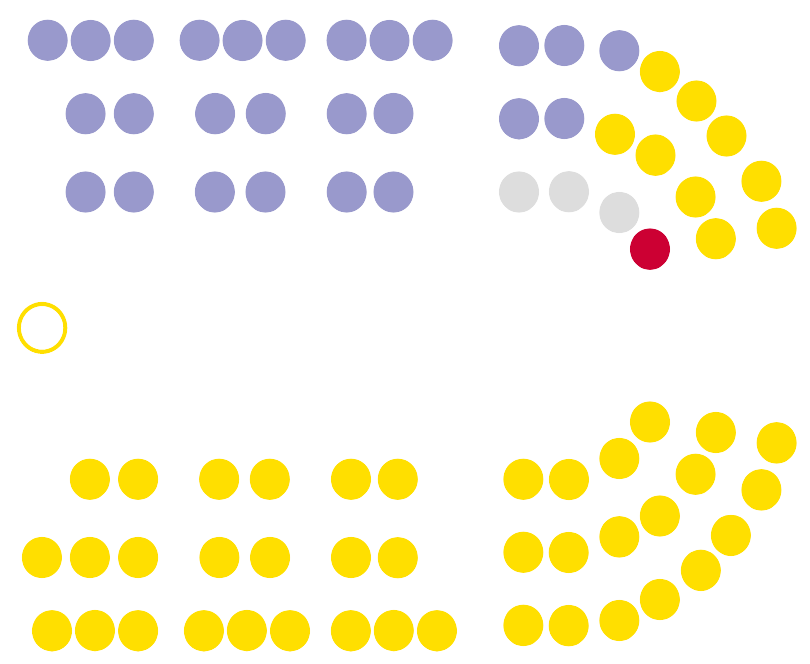
- Members: 80
- Speaker of the House: Arthur Guinness
- Prime Minister: Joseph Ward
- Leader of the Opposition: William Massey

Legislative Council
- Members: 45 (at start); 38 (at end)
- Speaker of the Council: Charles Bowen

Sovereign
- Monarch: HM George V — HM Edward VII until 6 May 1910
- Governor: HE Rt. Hon. The Lord Islington from 22 June 1910 — HE Rt. Hon. THe Lord Plunket until 8 June 1910

The 17th New Zealand Parliament was a term of the New Zealand Parliament. It was elected at the 1908 general election in November and December of that year.

== 1908 general election ==
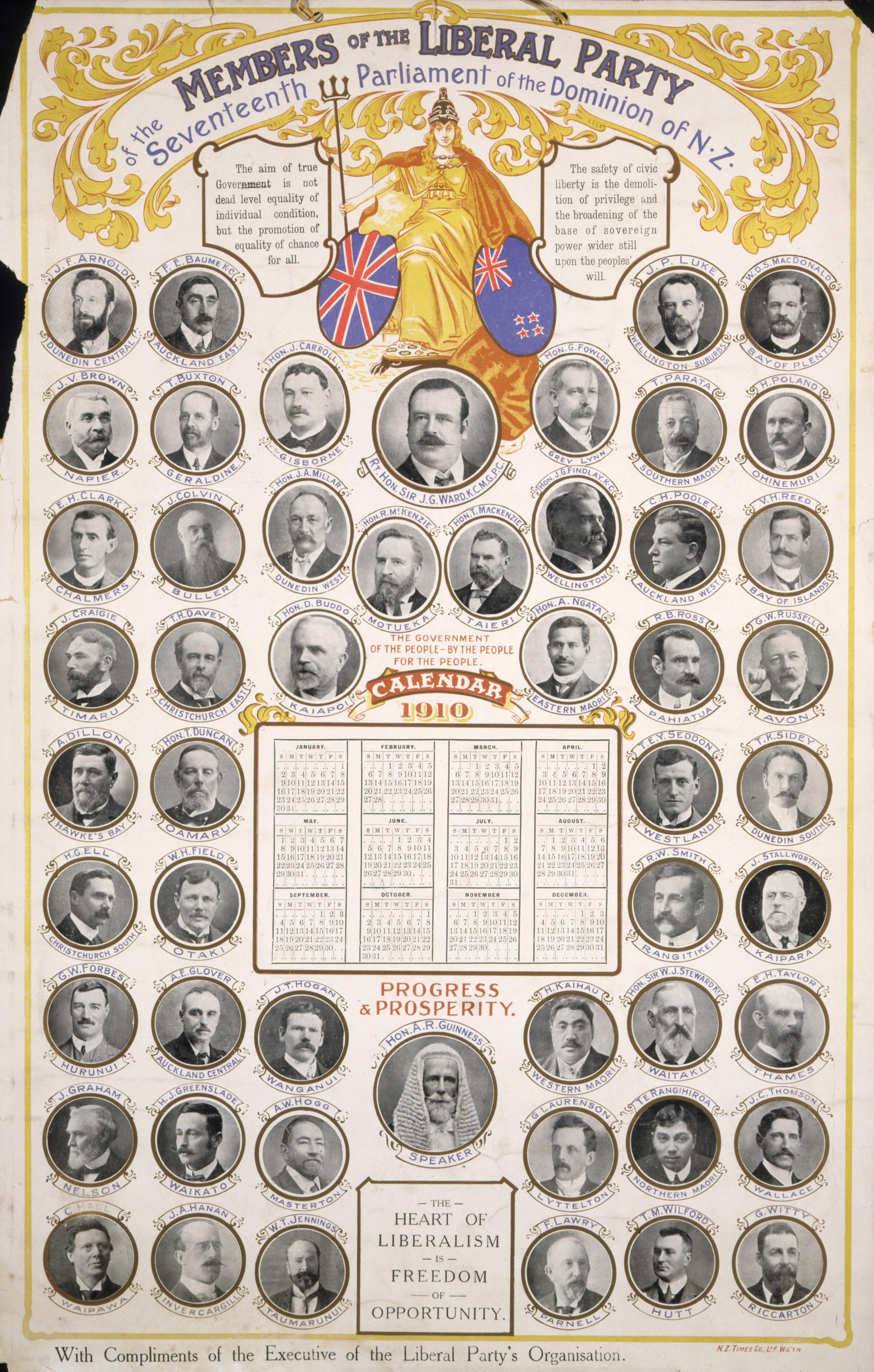
Members of the Liberal Party of the 17th Parliament

The Second Ballot Act 1908 was used for the 1908 general election. The first ballot was held on Tuesday, 17 November in the general electorates. 22 second ballots were held one week later on 24 November, and in one large rural electorate (Bay of Plenty), two weeks were allowed before the second ballot was held on 1 December. The Second Ballot Act did not apply to the four Māori electorates and the election was held on Wednesday, 2 December. A total of 80 MPs were elected; 41 represented North Island electorates, 35 represented South Island electorates, and the remaining four represented Māori electorates. 537,003 voters were enrolled and the official turnout at the election was 79.8%.

== Sessions ==
The 17th Parliament sat for four sessions (there were two sessions in 1909), and was prorogued on 20 November 1911.

Session	Opened	Adjourned
first	10 June 1909	16 June 1909
second	7 October 1909	28 December 1909
third	28 June 1910	3 December 1910
fourth	27 July 1911	28 October 1911

== Ministries ==
The Liberal Government of New Zealand had taken office on 24 January 1891. Joseph Ward formed the Ward Ministry on 6 August 1906. The Ward Ministry remained in power until Ward's resignation as prime minister in 1912.

== Party composition ==
=== Start of term ===
Party	Seats
Liberal || 50	
Conservative || 26	
Independent || 3	
Other	1

== Initial composition of the 17th Parliament ==
The following are the results of the 1908 general election:

Key

Liberal Conservative Ind. Labour League Independent Liberal Liberal–Labour Independent

Electorate results for the 1908 New Zealand general election
Electorate	Incumbent	Winner	Majority	Runner up
General electorates (Note: † in Majority column depicts electorates in which a second ballot was held.)
Ashburton	John McLachlan	William Nosworthy	747†	Frederick Flatman
Auckland Central	Alfred Kidd	Albert Glover	2,540	Alfred Kidd
Auckland East	Frederick Baume		1,096	William Richardson
Auckland West	Charles Poole		1,455	Robert Thompson
Avon	William Tanner	George Russell	541†	William Tanner
Awarua	Joseph Ward		2,183	William Morris
Bay of Islands	Robert Houston	Vernon Reed	265	John Charles Johnson
Bay of Plenty	William Herries	William MacDonald	446†	James Gow
Bruce	James Allen		1,393	Joseph Mosley
Buller	James Colvin		997	Fergus Ferguson Munro
Chalmers	Edmund Allen	Edward Henry Clark	226	Edmund Allen
Christchurch East	Thomas Davey		1,666	James McCombs
Christchurch North	Charles Gray	Tommy Taylor	1,698	Charles Gray
Christchurch South	Harry Ell (Note: Harry Ell was previously associated with the Liberal Party.)		1,273	Jim Thorn
Clutha	Alexander Malcolm		1,799	Frank Isitt
Dunedin Central	John A. Millar	James Arnold	1,512	John McDonald
Dunedin North	Alfred Barclay	George Thomson	6	Alfred Barclay
Dunedin South	James Arnold	Thomas Sidey	1,830	Robert Rutherford Douglas
Dunedin West	New electorate	John A. Millar	2,447	Jim Munro
Eden	John Bollard		2,164	John Shackelford
Egmont	William Thomas Jennings	Bradshaw Dive	249	George Wake
Ellesmere	Heaton Rhodes		902	George Rennie
Franklin	William Massey		1,187	John McLarin
Geraldine	Frederick Flatman	Thomas Buxton	92	William Jeffries
Gisborne	New electorate	James Carroll	734	George Darton
Grey	Arthur Guinness		1,115	James Kerr (Note: For some biographical details of James Kerr refer to his father's article)
Grey Lynn	George Fowlds		889	Oliver Nicholson
Hawke's Bay	Alfred Dillon		704	William Russell
Hurunui	Andrew Rutherford	George Forbes	597	Obed Clothier
Hutt	Thomas Wilford		1,538	Richard Shortt
Invercargill	Josiah Hanan		848	Arthur Paape
Kaiapoi	David Buddo		77	Richard Moore
Kaipara	John Stallworthy		283	Alfred Harding
Lyttelton	George Laurenson		803	Henry Thacker
Manawatu	John Stevens	Edward Newman	585	John Stevens
Manukau	Frederic Lang		1,369	Alfred Creamer
Marsden	Francis Mander		704	James Harrison
Masterton	Alexander Hogg		1,248	John Hunter
Mataura	Robert McNab	George Anderson	366	Robert McNab
Motueka	Roderick McKenzie		1,501	Frederick Smith
Napier	Alfred Fraser	Vigor Brown	1,035	Alfred Fraser
Nelson	John Graham		14	Harry Atmore
Oamaru	Thomas Young Duncan		613	James Mitchell
Ohinemuri	Hugh Poland		692†	Frederick Haselden
Oroua	Frank Lethbridge	David Guthrie	941	Owen Pleasants
Otaki	William Hughes Field	William Hughes Field	93	Byron Brown
Pahiatua	Robert Beatson Ross		264	James Cooper
Palmerston	William Wood	David Buick	81†	William Wood
Parnell	Frank Lawry		219	Edward George Britton Moss
Patea	Walter Symes	George Pearce	252	Charles E. Major
Rangitikei	Arthur Remington		158	Robert William Smith
Riccarton	George Witty		1,600	George Sheat
Selwyn	Charles Hardy		383	Joseph Ivess
Stratford	New electorate	John Hine	724	Walter Symes
Taranaki	Henry Okey		1,295	William Malone
Taieri	Donald Reid	Thomas Mackenzie	521	John Thomas Johnson
Taumarunui	New electorate	William Thomas Jennings	1,850	William Bowater
Tauranga	New electorate	William Herries	1,303	James Alexander Young
Thames	James McGowan		2,100	Ernest Deeble
Timaru	William Hall-Jones	James Craigie	380†	William David Campbell
Tuapeka	William Chapple	Robert Scott	697†	John MacPherson
Wairarapa	J. T. Marryat Hornsby	Walter Clarke Buchanan	136	J. T. Marryat Hornsby
Wairau	Charles H. Mills	John Duncan	252	Robert McArtney
Waikato	Henry Greenslade		493	Allen Bell
Waipawa	Charles Hall		50	George Hunter
Waitaki	William Steward		329	Francis Henry Smith
Waitemata	Ewen Alison	Leonard Phillips	903†	William Joseph Napier
Wakatipu	William Fraser		1,151	Andrew Martin
Wallace	John Charles Thomson		1,346	Dugald MacPherson
Wanganui	James Thomas Hogan		742†	George Hutchison
Wellington Central	Francis Fisher		143	Thomas Hislop
Wellington East	John Aitken	David McLaren	427†	Arthur Atkinson
Wellington North	Charles Hayward Izard	Alexander Herdman	826†	Frederick Bolton
Wellington South	New electorate	Robert Wright	558†	William Barber
Wellington Suburbs	New electorate	John Luke	1,148†	John Edward Fitzgerald
Westland	Tom Seddon		110	Henry Michel
Māori electorates (Note: The affiliation of many of the Māori candidates is unknown or uncertain; note that the Second Ballot Act 1908 did not apply to Māori constituencies.)
Eastern Maori	Āpirana Ngata		3,010	Tiki Paaka
Northern Maori	Hone Heke		1,045	Hare te Rangi
Southern Maori	Tame Parata		7	Teone Hopere Wharewiti Uru
Western Maori	Henare Kaihau		757	Pepene Eketone

Table footnotes:

== By-elections during 17th Parliament ==
There were a number of changes during the term of the 17th Parliament.

=== By-elections ===
Electorate and by-election		Date	Incumbent	Cause	Winner
Thames	1909	4 February	James McGowan	Appointed to Legislative Council	Edmund Taylor
Northern Maori	1909	20 March	Hone Heke Ngapua	Death	Peter Buck
Rangitikei	1909	16 September	Arthur Remington	Death	Robert Smith
Auckland East	1910	16 June	Frederick Baume	Death	Arthur Myers
Christchurch North	1911	17 August	Tommy Taylor	Death	Leonard Isitt

=== Party affiliation changes ===
Name	Year	Seat	From	To
William Hughes Field	1909	Otaki	Independent	Reform
Francis Fisher	1910	Wellington Central	Independent	Reform
David McLaren	1910	Wellington East	Ind. Labour League	Labour
