= January 1920 New Zealand Liberal Party leadership election =

Election in New Zealand

1920 New Zealand Liberal Party leadership election
- 14 January 1920
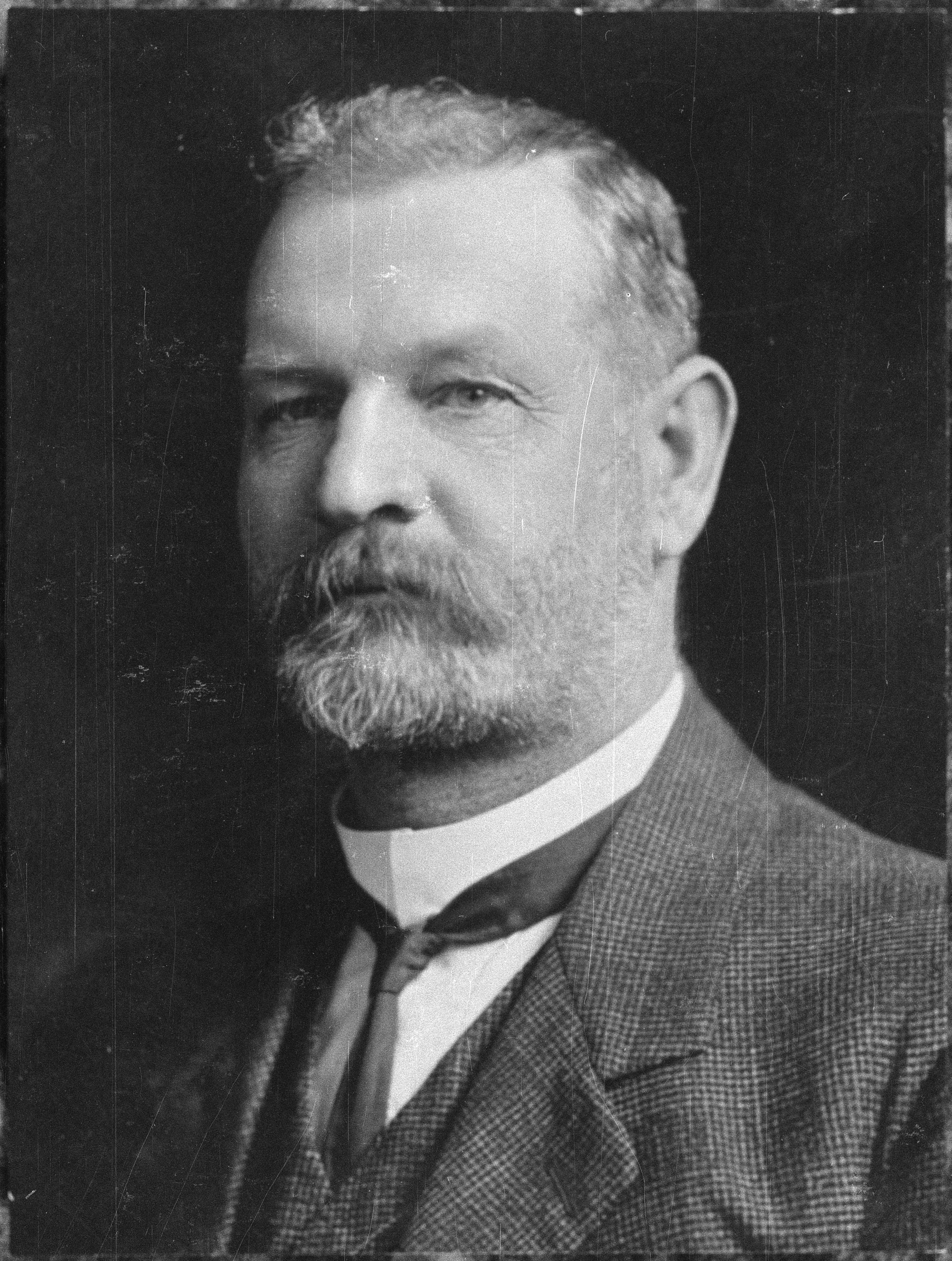
Candidate	William MacDonald
Popular vote	elected unopposed
Leader before election
William MacDonald (acting)
Leader after election
William MacDonald

An election for the leadership of the New Zealand Liberal Party was held on 14 January 1920 to choose the next leader of the party. The election was won by Bay of Plenty MP and acting party leader William MacDonald.

== Background ==
During World War I the Liberal Party had been in a grand coalition with the Reform Party. However, in May 1919, months after the war had ended the Liberals held a caucus meeting to discuss the coalition, where a majority of members voted in favour of ending the arrangement upon their leader Sir Joseph Ward's return to New Zealand. The acting leader, William MacDonald, was himself unsure the correct decision was reached and he cabled Ward for his opinion, who agreed with the consensus in the caucus. Consequently, MacDonald worked with his colleagues (particularly George Warren Russell and Thomas Wilford) to develop an updated policy manifesto for the next election. At the ensuing 1919 general election the Liberal's did poorly losing many seats including that of Ward. Due to Ward's failure to gain re-election to parliament, MacDonald took over as acting leader.

Wilford was interviewed by an Evening Post reporter in late December 1919 where he stated his preference for MacDonald to lead the party on a permanent basis and should he accept Wilford would nominate him for the position. A meeting was called by MacDonald in early January 1920 held in Rotorua with several prominent Liberal Party MPs including Thomas Wilford and Arthur Myers. There they had preliminary discussions ahead of the main caucus meeting, on policy, organisation and leadership for the party.

== Candidates ==
=== William MacDonald ===
MacDonald had been the MP for Bay of Plenty since 1908 and had briefly been a minister in the short lived 1912 cabinet of Thomas Mackenzie. He then served from 1915 to 1919 in the wartime cabinet as Minister of Agriculture and Minister of Mines. In 1919 MacDonald had deputised several times for Ward while he was overseas.

=== Others ===
The names of Thomas Sidey, Arthur Myers and particularly Thomas Wilford were suggested as possible leaders. However, when Wilford stated publicly that he would instead support MacDonald, intimating he would only consider standing should MacDonald decline, he was ruled out as a possible candidate.

== Result ==
As MacDonald was the only officially nominated candidate, he was elected as leader unopposed by the caucus. He was nominated by Wilford and seconded by Myers.

== Aftermath ==
Macdonald lead the party for several months before his health started to deteriorate in mid-1919 after he broke his arm in an accident. As a result, he took leave from his Parliamentary duties for several weeks in order to go to Auckland on a health recuperating visit, leaving Wilford to act as Leader of the Opposition. Macdonald recovered following his treatment in Auckland and was able to resumed his seat in Parliament. However he died suddenly in his home in Kelburn on 31 August 1920. He was still able to speak in the house the day before he died.
