= Reform Government of New Zealand =

Government of New Zealand, 1912–1928

The Reform Government of New Zealand was the government of New Zealand from 1912 to 1928, led by the conservative Reform Party.

It is probably best remembered for its anti-trade union stance in the Waihi miners' strike of 1912 and a dockworkers' strike the following year. It governed during World War I, during which a temporary coalition was formed with the Liberal Party.

== Significant policies ==
=== Industrial ===
- Sided with employers in the 1912 Waihi miners' strike and the waterfront workers' strike of 1913. In the latter strike, civilians enrolled as 'special constables' became known as 'Massey's Cossacks'.
- The Board of Trade Act (1919) gave government the power to regulate industries "in the interests of economic welfare".

=== Public service ===
- The Public Service Act (1912) put a commissioner at the head of the public service and replaced political patronage over appointments and inconsistency between departments with 'scientific management'

=== Health ===
- Compulsory medical inspection of schoolchildren was introduced (1912).
- A minimum drinking age of 21 was introduced (1914).
- A Board of Health was set up (1920).

=== Welfare ===
- A juvenile probation scheme was established (1913).
- Widow's pensions were extended to the wives of mental hospital patients (1912).
- From 1914 onwards, a dependent child's exemption for income tax purposes was provided.
- The Miners Phthisis Act (1915) introduced pensions for completely incapacitated victims of pneumoconiosis.
- Pensions were introduced for miners' widows (1915).
- The War Pensions Act of 1915 introduced war widows pensions, which were paid without a means test from 1916 onwards.
- In 1917, supplementary pensions were established for disablement pensioners who could not support themselves and their families. In 1923, these were replaced (as noted by one observer) "by the more generous economic pensions which were available to both disablement and dependants pensioners."
- The Housing Act (1919) specified sums of government money "that local authorities could borrow to erect workers' dwellings".
- The war pensions system was extended (1919).
- Women were made eligible for Parliament (1919).
- Pensions for the blind were introduced (1924).
- Family allowances were introduced for the second child onwards (1926).
- Legislation was introduced (1922) which increasingly placed farm products under the control of boards.
- Children's Courts were established (1925).
- Borstal institutions were established (1924).
- The Child Welfare Act 1925 introduced compulsory inquiries into the living circumstances of all children born outside marriage.

=== Education ===
- The Education Act (1914) made it compulsory for public secondary schools to take free-place pupils.
- The school-leaving age was raised to 14 (1914).

=== Foreign affairs and military ===
- Brought New Zealand into World War I with Britain and the Allies, see Military history of New Zealand in World War I.
- Introduced conscription in 1916, following registration of male residents between 17 and 60 under the National Registration Act, 1915.

== Formation ==
From the start of representative government in New Zealand, in the mid nineteenth century, until the 1890s, New Zealand governments were not formed on a party basis but were rather loose and shifting groups of individuals. In the 1880s and 1890s a group of politicians formed themselves into New Zealand's first true political party, the Liberals, which became the Liberal government in 1890. It remained in power for more than two decades, testimony not only to its popular policies and dynamic leadership but also to its organisation and party structure.

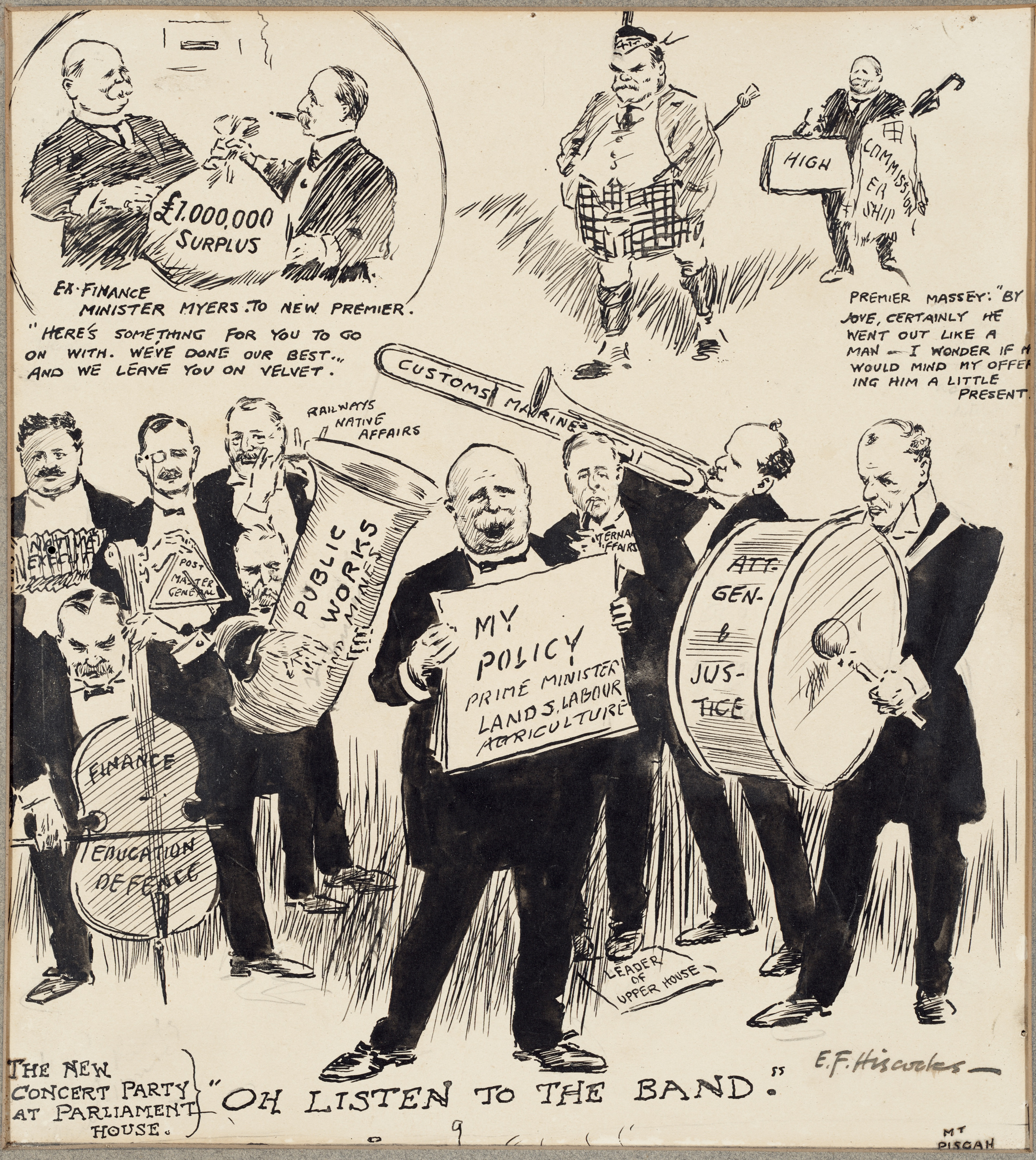
1912 cartoon about the Massey Government

The opposition was initially disorganised and fractured. John Bryce was briefly recognised as Leader of the Opposition in 1891, then William Rolleston from 1891 to 1893 and William Russell from 1894 to 1901. William Massey held the position from 1903, and by 1909 the opposition had coalesced into a new party known as the Reform Party under Massey's leadership.

Although the 1911 election saw Reform win 37 seats to the Liberal Party's 33, the balance of power was held by several independent Members of Parliament, who supported the Liberals. Over the next few months, however, enough switched sides for the Liberal government to lose a confidence vote, thus bringing Reform to power in July 1912.

== 1914 election and wartime coalition ==
Following the 1914 election, Reform held only 40 seats in the 80 seat parliament. By this time only one independent MP remained, the left-wing John Payne. Neither he nor the two small workers' parties (United Labour and Social Democrats) in parliament were likely to ally with the right-wing Reform Party.

However, the outbreak of World War I earlier in the year had created a need for national unity, and a hitherto unlikely coalition was formed between Reform and the party Reform had been set up to defeat, the Liberals. Massey retained his position as Prime Minister, with Liberal leader Joseph Ward becoming unofficial co-leader. Payne also supported the war, but both United Labour and the Social Democrats were against it, especially conscription. In 1916 they combined to form the New Zealand Labour Party, which became the official opposition. Several Labour MPs were jailed for their anti-conscription activities or for refusing military service.

== 1919 election ==
The coalition became increasingly difficult to manage, due partly to a personality clash between Massey and Ward. Following the end of the war in November 1918, the coalition dissolved, the two parties fought the subsequent election separately. Reform won an additional six seats, gaining a working majority at last.

== 1922 election ==
Economic problems had reduced the government's popularity, and the election left Reform with only 37 seats - four short of a majority. Massey was forced to cobble together a coalition of Reform, independents, and two Liberal MPs who were later rewarded with seats in the Legislative Council. The Labour Party was gaining considerable support, causing Massey to worry that it would soon supersede the Liberals.

== 1925 election ==
Labour continued to grow in popularity, and in the 1925 election gained more seats than the Liberals. The two parties were competing for many of the same voters, and for the anti-government vote in particular, and this worked to Reform's benefit. Although the party gained an additional 18 seats, its share of the vote rose by only 8.3%, suggesting that it benefitted from vote-splitting in many electorates.

== 1928 election ==
Following its disastrous performance in the 1925 election, the Liberal Party reconstituted itself as the United Party and regained some of its lost popularity. Reform and United each won 27 seats, with the Labour Party holding the balance of power with 19. Labour were long-term opponents of Reform and supported United, enabling United to take power.

== Election results ==
Election	Parliament	Seats	Total votes	Percentage	Gain (loss)	Seats won	Change	Majority
1911	18th	80	590,042			37
1914	19th	80	616,043			40	+3	0
1919	20th	80	683,420			47	+7	7
1922	21st	80	700,111	39.4%		37	-10
1925	22nd	80	678,877	47.79%	+8.39%	55	+18	15
1928	23rd	80	844,633	34.8%	-12.99%	27	-28

== Prime ministers ==
The government was led by William Massey from 10 July 1912 until his death on 10 May 1925. Francis Bell, who had earlier been Acting Prime Minister, briefly became Prime Minister (from 14 to 30 May 1925) but declined his party's offer of the job on a permanent basis. Gordon Coates was then appointed from 30 May 1925, and held the position until 10 December 1928, as his party was defeated in the 1928 general election.

Prime Ministers of the Reform Government

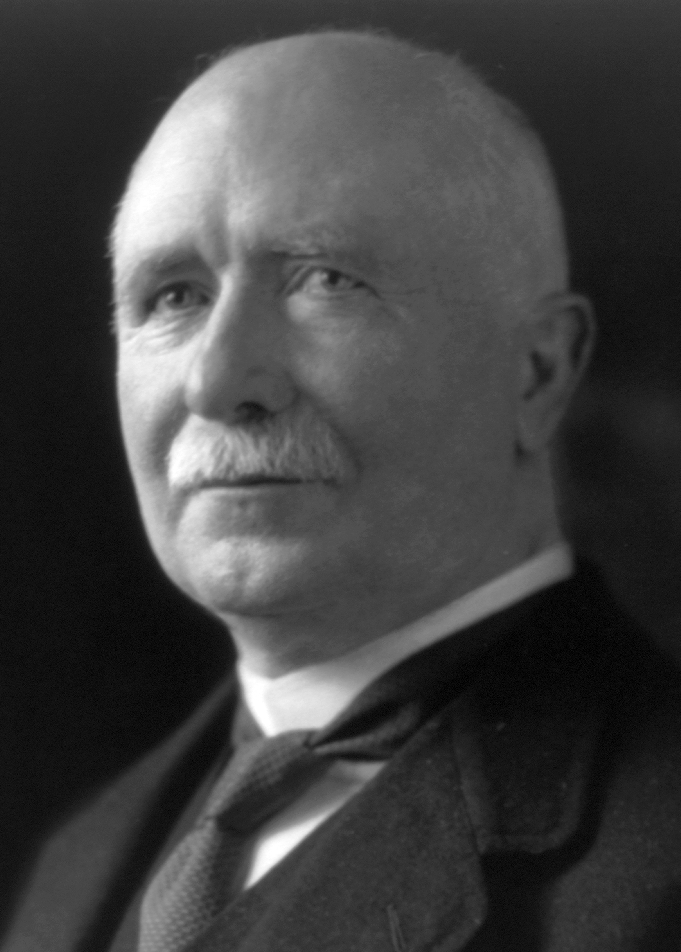
William Massey
served 1912-1925

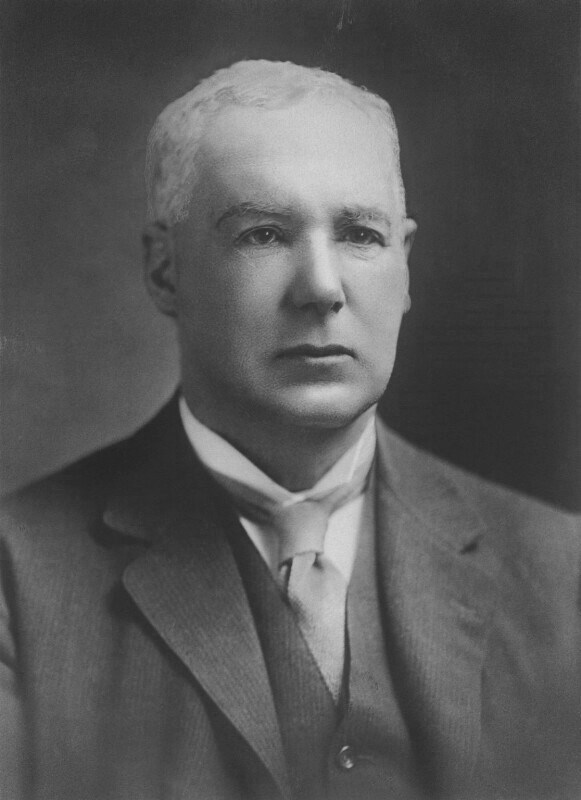
Francis Bell
served 1925

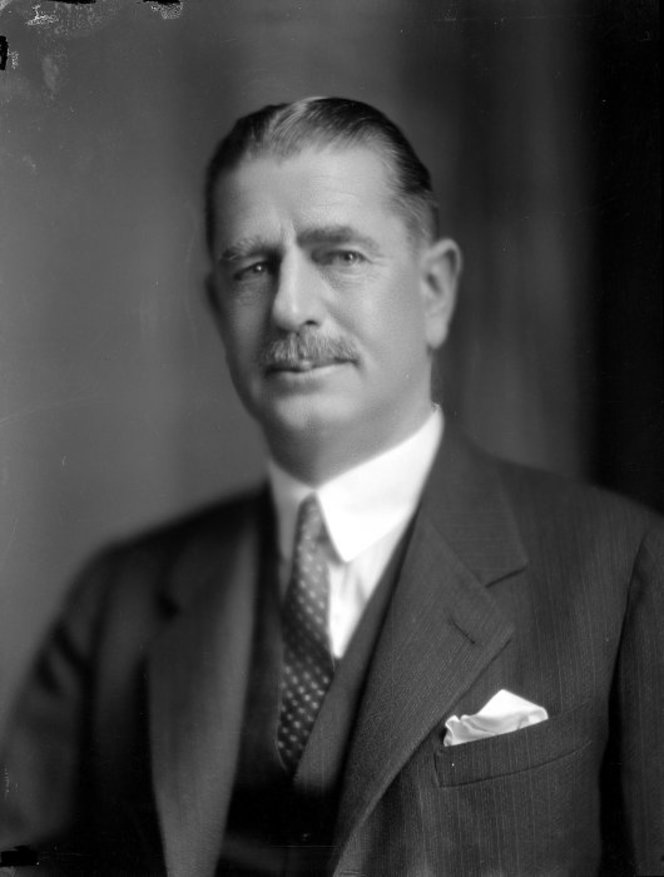
Gordon Coates
served 1925-1928

== Cabinet Ministers ==
Portfolio	Minister	Party	Start	End
Prime Minister	William Massey	Reform	10 July 1912	10 May 1925
Prime Minister	Francis Bell	Reform	14 May 1925	30 May 1925
Prime Minister	Gordon Coates	Reform	30 May 1925	10 December 1928
Minister of Agriculture	William Massey	Reform	10 July 1912	12 August 1915
Minister of Agriculture	William MacDonald	Liberal	12 August 1915	22 August 1919
Minister of Agriculture	William Nosworthy	Reform	22 August 1919	18 January 1926
Minister of Agriculture	Oswald Hawken	Reform	18 January 1926	24 August 1928
Attorney-General	Alexander Herdman	Reform	10 July 1912	4 February 1918
Attorney-General	Francis Bell	Reform	4 February 1918	18 January 1926
Attorney-General	William Downie Stewart	Reform	18 January 1926	24 May 1926
Attorney-General	Frank Rolleston	Reform	24 May 1926	10 December 1928
Minister of Customs	Francis Fisher	Reform	18 January 1926	7 January 1915
Minister of Customs	William Herries	Reform	12 August 1915	6 December 1935
Minister of Customs	Arthur Myers	Liberal	12 August 1915	22 August 1919
Minister of Customs	William Herries	Reform	22 August 1919	7 February 1921
Minister of Customs	William Downie Stewart	Reform	9 March 1921	10 December 1928
Minister of Defence	James Allen	Reform	10 July 1912	28 April 1920
Minister of Defence	Heaton Rhodes	Reform	21 July 1920	18 January 1926
Minister of Defence	Frank Rolleston	Reform	18 January 1926	26 November 1928
Minister of Defence	William Downie Stewart	Reform	26 November 1928	10 December 1928
Minister of Education	James Allen	Reform	10 July 1912	12 August 1915
Minister of Education	Josiah Hanan	Liberal	12 August 1915	22 August 1919
Minister of Education	Francis Bell	Reform	22 August 1919	3 April 1920
Minister of Education	James Parr	Reform	3 April 1920	24 May 1926
Minister of Education	Robert Alexander Wright	Reform	24 May 1926	24 August 1928
Minister of Finance	James Allen	Reform	10 July 1912	12 August 1915
Minister of Finance	Joseph Ward	Liberal	12 August 1915	22 August 1919
Minister of Finance	James Allen	Reform	22 August 1919	28 April 1920
Minister of Finance	William Massey	Reform	12 May 1920	10 May 1925
Minister of Finance	William Nosworthy	Reform	10 May 1925	24 May 1926
Minister of Finance	William Downie Stewart	Reform	24 May 1926	24 August 1928
Minister of Foreign Affairs	James Allen	Reform	24 November 1919	28 April 1920
Minister of Foreign Affairs	Ernest Lee	Reform	17 May 1920	13 January 1923
Minister of Foreign Affairs	Francis Bell	Reform	7 June 1923	18 January 1926
Minister of Foreign Affairs	William Nosworthy	Reform	24 May 1926	24 August 1928
Minister of Foreign Affairs	Gordon Coates	Reform	25 August 1928	10 December 1928
Commissioner of State Forests	Francis Bell	Reform	10 July 1912	21 February 1922
Commissioner of State Forests	Heaton Rhodes	Reform	21 February 1922	18 January 1926
Commissioner of State Forests	Oswald Hawken	Reform	18 January 1926	28 November 1928
Commissioner of State Forests	Kenneth Williams	Reform	28 November 1928	10 December 1928
Minister of Health	Heaton Rhodes	Reform	10 July 1912	12 August 1915
Minister of Health	George Warren Russell	Liberal	12 August 1915	22 August 1919
Minister of Health	Francis Bell	Reform	4 September 1919	3 April 1920
Minister of Health	James Parr	Reform	3 April 1920	7 June 1923
Minister of Health	Maui Pomare	Reform	7 June 1923	18 January 1926
Minister of Health	Alexander Young	Reform	18 January 1926	10 December 1928
Minister of Immigration	Francis Bell	Reform	10 July 1912	12 August 1915
Minister of Immigration	Josiah Hanan	Liberal	12 August 1915	16 August 1915
Minister of Immigration	Francis Bell	Reform	16 August 1915	14 May 1920
Minister of Immigration	William Nosworthy	Reform	14 May 1920	10 December 1928
Minister of Industries and Commerce	William Fraser	Reform	10 July 1912	26 July 1912
Minister of Industries and Commerce	William Massey	Reform	26 July 1912	22 June 1920
Minister of Industries and Commerce	Ernest Lee	Reform	22 June 1920	13 January 1923
Minister of Industries and Commerce	William Downie Stewart	Reform	13 January 1923	24 May 1926
Minister of Industries and Commerce	Alexander McLeod	Reform	24 May 1926	28 November 1928
Minister of Industries and Commerce	Alexander Young	Reform	28 November 1928	10 December 1928
Minister of Internal Affairs	Francis Bell	Reform	10 July 1912	12 August 1915
Minister of Internal Affairs	George Warren Russell	Liberal	12 August 1915	25 August 1919
Minister of Internal Affairs	John Bird Hine	Reform	4 September 1919	17 January 1920
Minister of Internal Affairs	Francis Bell	Reform	17 January 1920	10 May 1925
Minister of Internal Affairs	George James Anderson	Reform	17 May 1920	1 March 1921
Minister of Internal Affairs	William Downie Stewart	Reform	1 March 1921	27 June 1923
Minister of Internal Affairs	Richard Bollard	Reform	27 June 1923	25 August 1927
Minister of Internal Affairs	Māui Pōmare	Reform	25 August 1928	10 December 1928
Minister of Island Territories	James Allen	Reform	24 November 1919	28 April 1920
Minister of Island Territories	Ernest Lee	Reform	17 May 1920	13 January 1923
Minister of Island Territories	Francis Bell	Reform	7 June 1923	18 January 1926
Minister of Island Territories	William Nosworthy	Reform	24 May 1926	24 August 1928
Minister of Island Territories	Gordon Coates	Reform	25 August 1928	10 December 1928
Minister of Justice	Alexander Herdman	Reform	10 July 1912	12 August 1915
Minister of Justice	Robert McNab	Liberal	12 August 1915	20 February 1917
Minister of Justice	Josiah Hanan	Liberal	20 February 1917	14 November 1917
Minister of Justice	Thomas Wilford	Liberal	14 November 1917	25 August 1919
Minister of Justice	Gordon Coates	Reform	4 September 1919	3 April 1920
Minister of Justice	Ernest Lee	Reform	3 April 1920	13 January 1923
Minister of Justice	Francis Bell	Reform	13 January 1923	27 June 1923
Minister of Justice	James Parr	Reform	27 June 1923	18 January 1926
Minister of Justice	Frank Rolleston	Reform	18 January 1926	26 November 1928
Minister of Justice	William Downie Stewart	Reform	26 November 1928	10 December 1928
Minister of Labour	William Massey	Reform	10 July 1912	14 May 1920
Minister of Labour	William Herries	Reform	17 May 1920	7 February 1921
Minister of Labour	George Anderson	Reform	1 March 1921	26 November 1928
Minister of Labour	Robert Alexander Wright	Reform	26 November 1928	10 December 1928
Minister of Marine	Francis Fisher	Reform	10 July 1912	7 January 1915
Minister of Marine	William Herries	Reform	7 January 1915	12 August 1915
Minister of Marine	Robert McNab	Liberal	12 August 1915	3 February 1917
Minister of Marine	George Warren Russell	Liberal	20 February 1917	14 November 1917
Minister of Marine	Thomas Wilford	Liberal	14 November 1917	25 August 1919
Minister of Marine	William Herries	Reform	4 September 1919	7 February 1921
Minister of Marine	Francis Bell	Reform	1 March 1921	21 February 1922
Minister of Marine	George Anderson	Reform	21 February 1922	24 August 1928
Minister of Marine	Francis Bell	Reform	24 August 1928	10 December 1928
Minister of Mines	William Fraser	Reform	10 July 1912	12 August 1915
Minister of Mines	William MacDonald	Liberal	12 August 1915	22 August 1919
Minister of Mines	William Fraser	Reform	4 September 1919	27 July 1920
Minister of Mines	William Massey	Reform	3 April 1920	15 April 1921
Minister of Mines	George Anderson	Reform	15 April 1921	28 November 1928
Minister of Mines	Gordon Coates	Reform	28 November 1928	10 December 1928
Minister of Native Affairs	William Herries	Reform	10 July 1912	7 February 1921
Minister of Native Affairs	Gordon Coates	Reform	7 February 1921	10 December 1928
Postmaster-General	Heaton Rhodes	Reform	10 July 1912	12 August 1915
Postmaster-General	Joseph Ward	Liberal	12 August 1915	4 September 1919
Postmaster-General	Gordon Coates	Reform	4 September 1919	30 May 1925
Postmaster-General	James Parr	Reform	30 May 1925	24 May 1926
Postmaster-General	William Nosworthy	Reform	24 May 1926	10 December 1928
Minister of Railways	William Herries	Reform	10 July 1912	3 September 1919
Minister of Railways	William Massey	Reform	3 September 1919	16 May 1922
Minister of Railways	David Guthrie	Reform	16 May 1922	6 June 1923
Minister of Railways	Gordon Coates	Reform	6 June 1923	10 December 1928
Minister of Revenue	James Allen	Reform	10 July 1912	12 August 1915
Minister of Revenue	Joseph Ward	Liberal	12 August 1915	21 August 1919
Minister of Revenue	James Allen	Reform	4 September 1919	28 April 1920
Minister of Revenue	William Massey	Reform	28 April 1920	10 May 1925
Minister of Revenue	William Nosworthy	Reform	14 May 1925	24 May 1926
Minister of Revenue	William Downie Stewart	Reform	24 May 1926	10 December 1928
Minister of Works	William Fraser	Reform	10 July 1912	3 April 1920
Minister of Works	Gordon Coates	Reform	3 April 1920	12 June 1926
Minister of Works	Kenneth Williams	Reform	12 June 1926	10 December 1928

== See also ==
- List of New Zealand governments

== Sources ==
- King, Michael (2003). The Penguin History of New Zealand (First ed.). Auckland: Penguin Books. ISBN 0143018671.
- Sinclair, Keith; Dalziel, Raewyn (2000). A History of New Zealand: Revised Edition (Fifth revised ed.). Auckland: Penguin Books. ISBN 978-0140298758.
