= James Gow (politician) =

New Zealand politician (1862–1942)

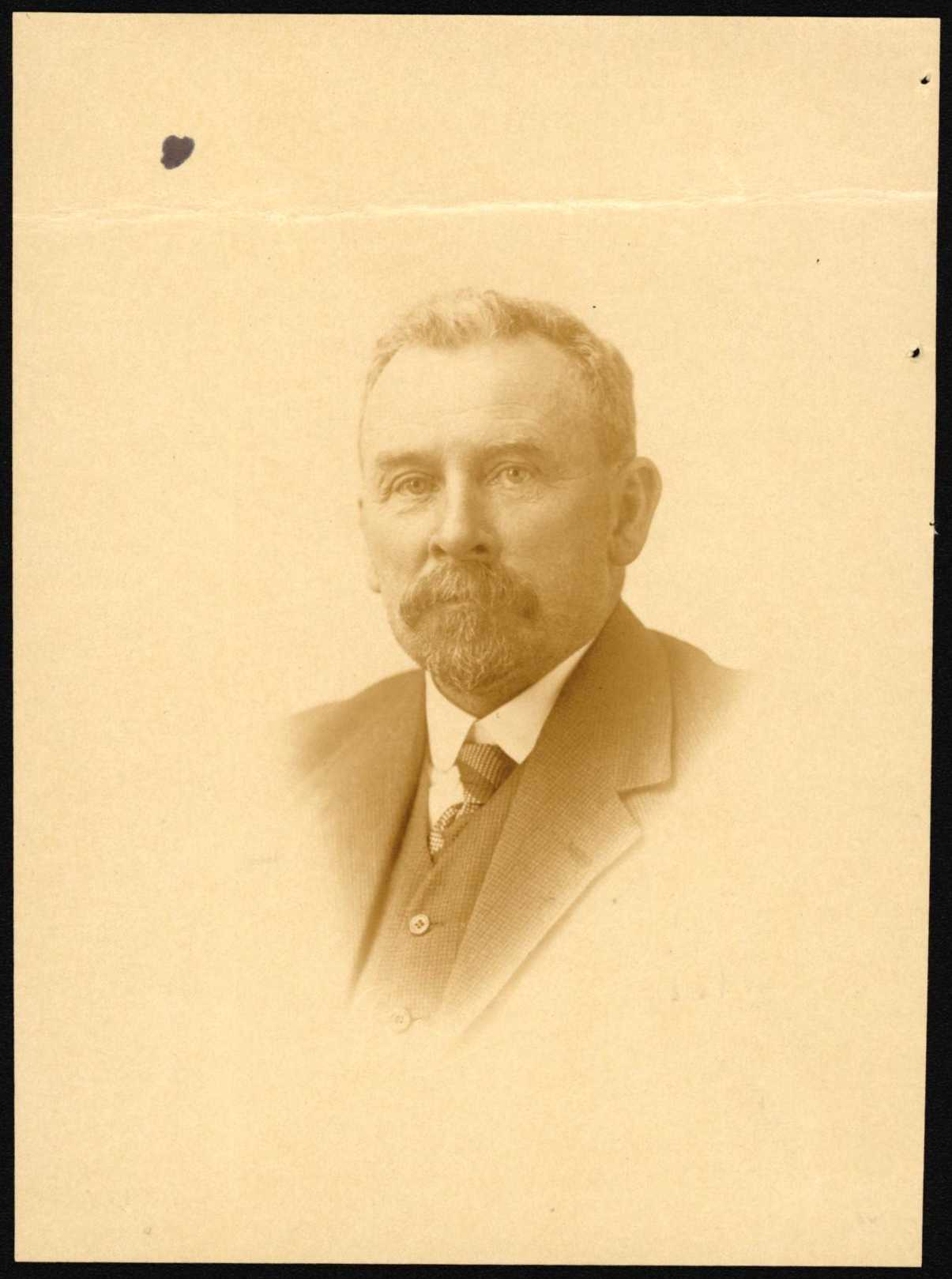
- Gow in 1925
- Born: James Burman Gow; 27 October 1862. Forfarshire
- Died: 6 August 1942 (aged 79); Ōpōtiki
- Known for: Member of New Zealand Legislative Council

James Burman Gow (1862 – 6 August 1942) was a member of the New Zealand Legislative Council.

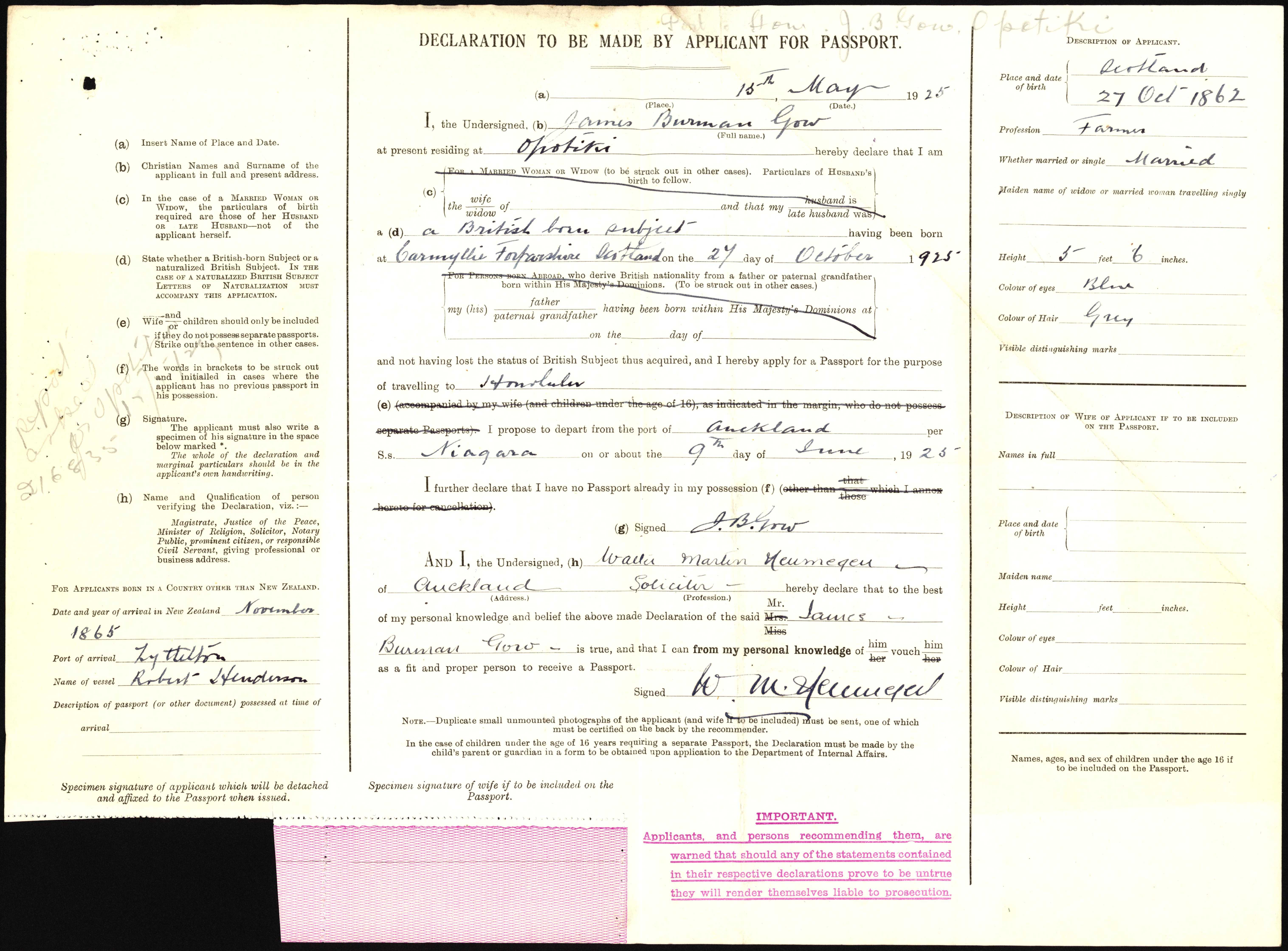
James Burman Gow passport application (1925)

Gow was born in 1862 in Forfarshire, Scotland. He arrived in New Zealand as a boy and received his education at Otago Boys' High School. He married Agnes Alison Murray in 1886.

He was from Ōpōtiki where he owned a mill. In the 1908 general election he was a candidate for the Bay of Plenty electorate, but he was beaten by William MacDonald in the second ballot. He was a member of the Legislative Council from 7 May 1918 to 6 May 1925; then 7 May 1925 to 6 May 1932, when his term ended. He was appointed by the Reform Government.

He died on 6 August 1942 at his residence in Ōpōtiki, and was survived by his wife, three sons and three daughters.
