= Tom Rutherford =

National Party politician in New Zealand

Tom Rutherford MP
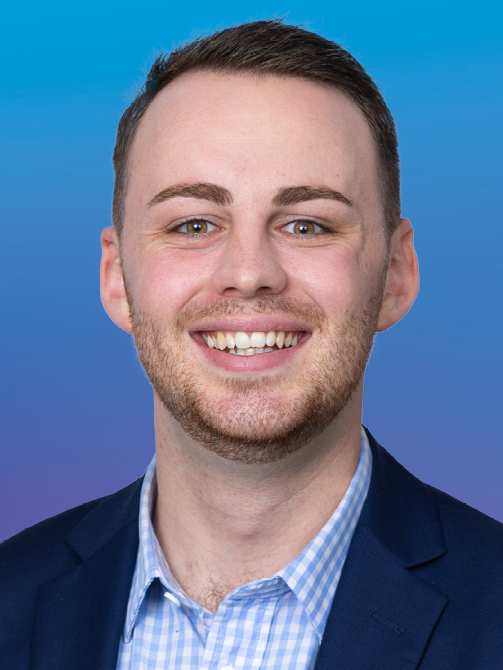
- Rutherford in 2023

Member of the New Zealand Parliament for Bay of Plenty
- Incumbent
- Assumed office 14 October 2023
- Preceded by: Todd Muller

Personal details
- Born: 1997 (age 28–29) Tauranga, New Zealand
- Party: National
- Website: https://www.national.org.nz/team/tomrutherford

Tom Rutherford (born 1996 or 1997) is a New Zealand politician and communications executive. A member of the National Party, he has served as the Member of Parliament for the Bay of Plenty since October 2023.

== Early life ==
Rutherford was brought up in the Bay of Plenty. Rutherford's mother Sharon Nightingale is the National Party event manager in the Bay of Plenty. Before entering politics, Rutherford was a communications executive, and had worked for mayor and former National Party candidate Tania Tapsell at Rotorua Lakes Council. In 2013, he was selected as a Youth MP by Brendan Horan. Rutherford is also a Hockey New Zealand umpire, having officiated in 14 nationally tracked tournaments since 2017. Rutherford is also a volunteer firefighter, a rugby referee and captained the Greerton Cricket Club.

== Political career ==
New Zealand Parliament
Years	Term	Electorate	List	Party
2023–2026	54th	Bay of Plenty	70	National
2026–present	55th	Mt Maunganui	27	National

Rutherford was shortlisted for the National Party candidacy in the 2022 Tauranga by-election, held after the resignation of Simon Bridges, but lost out to Sam Uffindell.

Rutherford was selected by the National Party to contest the Bay of Plenty electorate at the 2023 election. He was 70th on the party list. Rutherford was the youngest National Party candidate in 2023, but said he was mentored by Tony Ryall, who was also 26 when he was elected to represent Bay of Plenty. On election night, Rutherford received 23,303 votes, comfortably beating the Labour Party's Pare Taikato on 7,898.

Rutherford was selected to contest the Mt Maunganui electorate, the electorate that replaced Bay of Plenty, for the 2026 election. He was ranked 27th on the National Party list. On 7 November, Rutherford retained Mt Maunganui by a landslide margin of 14,059 votes, based on preliminary results.

== Views and positions ==
Rutherford has said the biggest issues to be dealt with by government are "cost of living, transport and crime". He is keen to help improve transport and infrastructure to reduce congestion in Bay of Plenty. Rutherford also says that police should be given more powers. Rutherford also said he is keen to see democracy returned to Tauranga City Council (the council has been run by four commissioners since early 2021), and would work with the MP for Tauranga, Sam Uffindell, to ensure that happened.

New Zealand Parliament
Preceded by Todd Muller	Member of Parliament for Bay of Plenty; 2023–present	Incumbent
