= 1929 Birthday Honours (New Zealand) =

Awards list for New Zealand

The 1929 King's Birthday Honours in New Zealand, celebrating the official birthday of King George V, were appointments made by the King on the recommendation of the New Zealand government to various orders and honours to reward and highlight good works by New Zealanders. They were announced on 3 June 1929.

The recipients of honours are displayed here as they were styled before their new honour.

== Knight Bachelor ==
- Henry Buckleton – of Wellington; general manager, Bank of New Zealand.
- The Honourable Alexander Lawrence Herdman – of Auckland; judge of the Supreme Court.
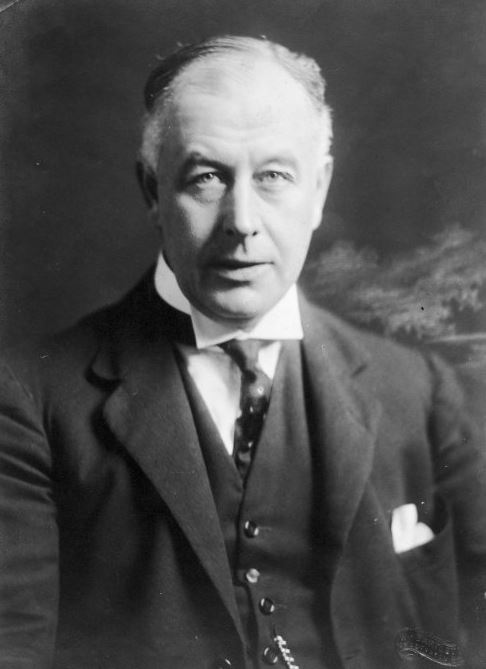
Sir Alexander Herdman

== Order of Saint Michael and Saint George ==
=== Companion (CMG) ===
- Leonard Cockayne PhD FRS – of Wellington. For honorary scientific services to the government.
- Robert Edward Hayes ISO – of Wellington; paymaster-general and secretary to the Treasury.
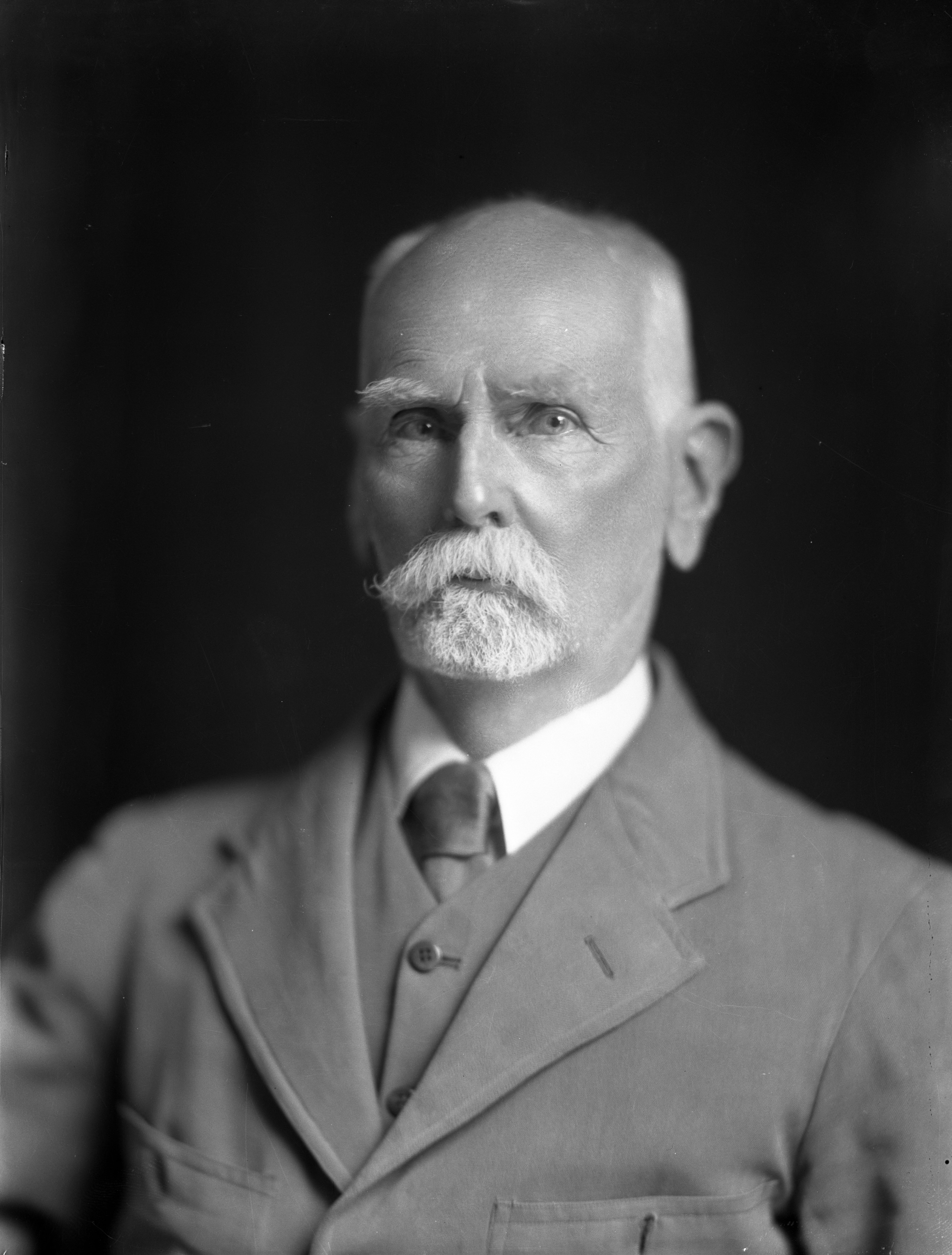
Leonard Cockayne

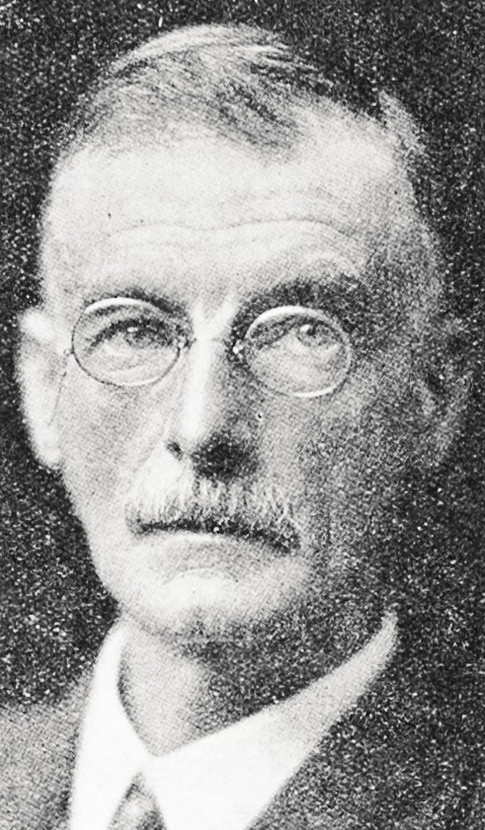
Robert Edward Hayes

== Companion of the Imperial Service Order (ISO) ==
- Fortescue William Thomas Rowley – secretary, Department of Labour.
