= Alexander Herdman =

New Zealand politician (1869–1953)

The Honourable Sir Alexander Herdman
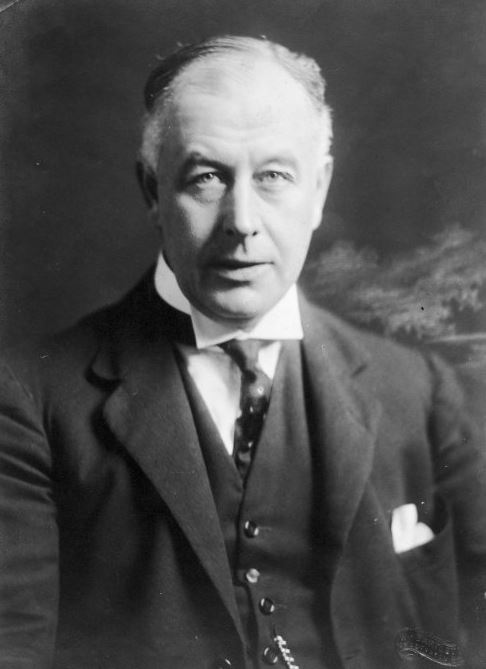

11th Attorney-General of New Zealand
- In office 10 July 1912 – 4 February 1918
- Preceded by: John Findlay
- Succeeded by: Francis Bell

19th Minister of Justice of New Zealand
- In office 10 July 1912 – 12 August 1915
- Preceded by: Josiah Hanan
- Succeeded by: Robert McNab

Personal details
- Born: 17 July 1869 Dunedin, New Zealand
- Died: 13 June 1953 (aged 83) Rotorua, New Zealand
- Party: Reform

Sir Alexander Lawrence Herdman (17 July 1869 – 13 June 1953) was a New Zealand politician. He served as Attorney-General, Minister of Justice, and Minister of Police. He is known for his reforms of the civil service and for his hard line on law and order.

== Early life ==
Herdman was born in Dunedin. He studied at Otago Boys' High School, and then gained a law degree while working part-time. He was admitted to the bar in 1894, and established a practice in Naseby the following year. He also worked in Palmerston, where he joined the local Freemason lodge. He would retain his connection with the Freemasons over his career, eventually grand master of the Grand Lodge of New Zealand.

== Early political career ==
New Zealand Parliament
Years	Term	Electorate	Party
1902–1905	15th	Mount Ida	Independent
1908–1909	17th	Wellington North	Independent
1909–1911	Changed allegiance to:		Reform
1911–1914	18th	Wellington North	Reform
1914–1918	19th	Wellington North	Reform

Herdman began a political career in Naseby, being elected mayor in 1898. He eventually decided to abandon this by moving to Wellington in 1902, but shortly after he arrived, he was invited to return and stand as a parliamentary candidate in Mount Ida, the Otago electorate which encompassed Naseby. In the 1902 election, Herdman ran on a strongly anti-government platform, harshly criticising the governing Liberal Party. He was elected, and joined the unorganised group of independents who opposed the Liberals. He did not, however, move back to Naseby, instead representing his seat as an absentee.

In the 1905 election, Herdman was defeated. In the 1908 election, he contested the seat of Wellington North, and was elected. The following year, William Massey organised the opposition into the Reform Party, which Herdman became part of.

One of Herdman's early concerns in Parliament was the reform of the public service. Herdman believed that the service was poorly organised and subject to political patronage, particularly under the government of Richard Seddon. In the 1911 election, the Reform Party won office as the Reform Government, and Herdman was able to push through his reform proposals – the Public Service Act of 1912 established uniform conditions of appointment and promotion, and established a supervisory commissioner.

== Ministerial career ==
In Cabinet, Herdman served as Attorney-General (10 July 1912 – 4 February 1918), Minister of Justice (10 July 1912 – 12 August 1915), and Minister of Stamp Duties (13 July 1912 – 12 August 1915). In these roles, he gained a reputation as a hard-liner, being described by a contemporary as "ready to employ force ruthlessly for the purpose of upholding law and order". Herdman is believed to have had a major role in the suppression of the Waihi miners' strike, and of the waterfront strike the following year. Both were criticised by many left-wing groups as heavy-handed and repressive, but were defended by the government as necessary steps to preserve order. During World War I, Herdman supported strong measures against anyone protesting New Zealand's participation. As Minister responsible for Police, Herdman also responded harshly to attempts by police officers to form a union, prohibiting the move and attempting to drive the instigators out of the force.

== Judicial career ==
In addition to his political ambitions, Herdman was also interested in becoming a judge of the (original) Supreme Court. As Attorney-General, he had powers to appoint judges, and in 1918, when a position became vacant, he appointed himself. This move was criticised by many as self-interested, especially as Herdman's career as a lawyer had not been particularly distinguished. He served as a judge both in Christchurch and Auckland, and briefly acted as Chief Justice in 1929.

In the 1929 King's Birthday Honours, Herdman was appointed a Knight Bachelor.

== Attempted return to politics ==
In 1935, he resigned from his judicial position to seek re-election to Parliament, contesting the Auckland seat of Parnell. He was officially an independent, although he had close links to the Democrat Party. He was unsuccessful, and subsequently retired to the Lake Okataina area. He died in Rotorua on 13 June 1953.

== Notes ==
Political offices
Preceded by Josiah Hanan	Minister of Justice; 1912–1915	Succeeded by Robert McNab
Preceded by Josiah Hanan	Minister of Police; 1912–1918	Succeeded by Thomas Wilford
Preceded by John Findlay	Attorney-General; 1912–1918	Succeeded by Francis Bell
New Zealand Parliament
In abeyance Title last held by Scobie Mackenzie	Member of Parliament for Mount Ida; 1902–1905	Succeeded by Jack MacPherson
