= William Herries =

New Zealand politician (1859–1923)

Sir William Herries KCMG
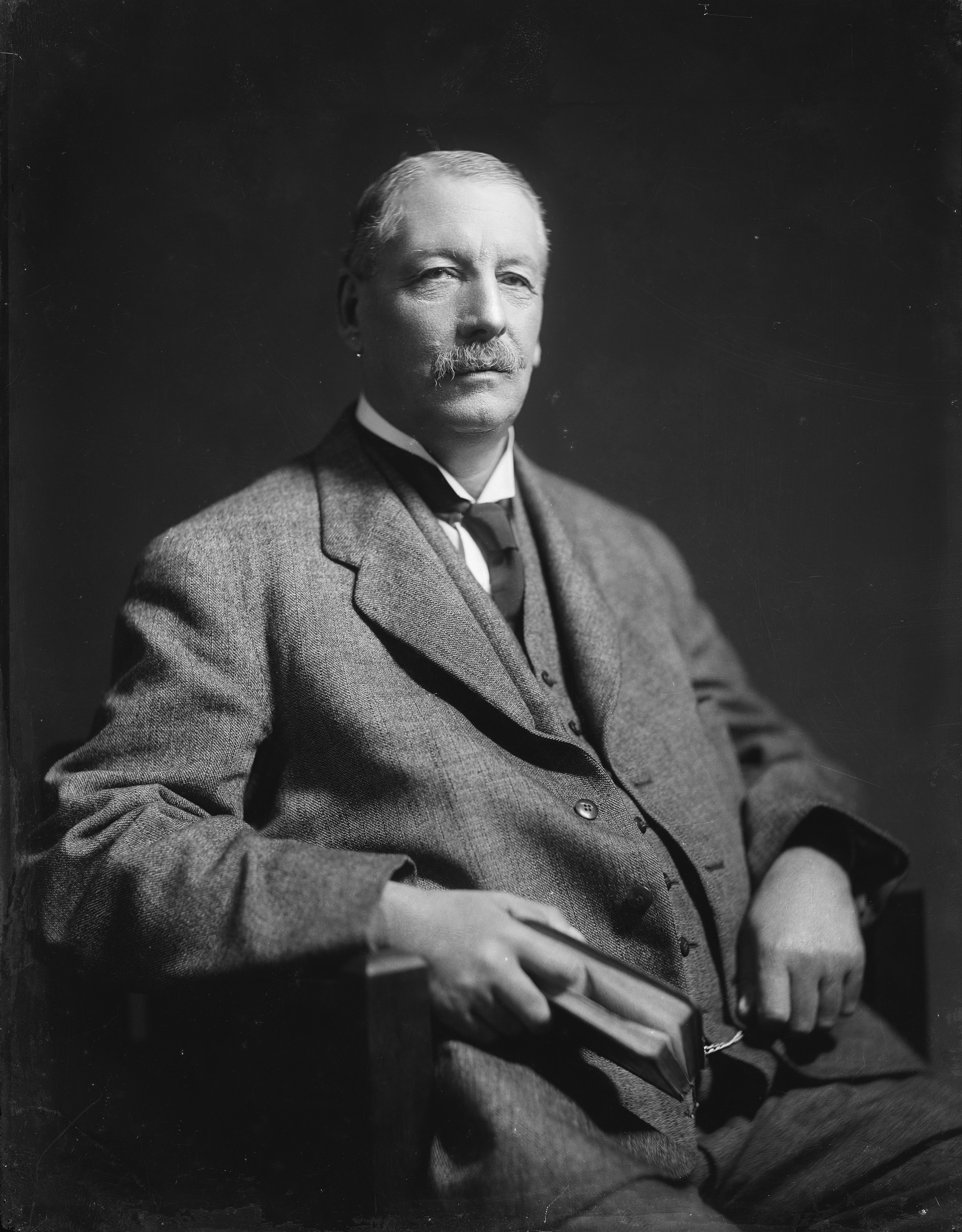
- William Herries in 1921
- Born: William Herbert Herries; 19 April 1859; London, England
- Died: 22 February 1923 (aged 63); Wellington, Dominion of New Zealand
- Occupation: politician

Sir William Herbert Herries KCMG (19 April 1859 – 22 February 1923) was an English-born New Zealand politician who served as a member of the Piako County Council and later as MP for Bay of Plenty and Tauranga.

== Biography ==
Herries was born in London, the son of Herbert Crompton Herries, a barrister, and his wife, Leonora Emma Wickham. His grandfather was Henry Lewis Wickham, a Receiver General of Gibraltar. The English MP William Wickham was his uncle. From a wealthy middle-class family, he was educated at Eton College and Trinity College, Cambridge, where he studied natural sciences. Herries had an interest in geology and he later became a Fellow of the Geological Society. Herries was also interested in horse racing and wrote a book on breeding horses. He was also president of the South Auckland Racing Club and Te Aroha Jockey Club.

At the age of 22 he emigrated to New Zealand aboard the Tararua and obtained 900 acres (360 ha) at Shaftesbury. On 4 December 1889, he married his neighbour Catherine Louisa Roche; they remained without children. In 1891 to 1899 Herries served as a member of the Piako County Council.

New Zealand Parliament
Years	Term	Electorate	Party
1896–1899	13th	Bay of Plenty	Independent
1899–1902	14th	Bay of Plenty	Independent
1902–1905	15th	Bay of Plenty	Independent
1905–1908	16th	Bay of Plenty	Independent
1908–1909	17th	Tauranga	Independent
1909–1911	Changed allegiance to:		Reform
1911–1914	18th	Tauranga	Reform
1914–1919	19th	Tauranga	Reform
1919–1922	20th	Tauranga	Reform
1922–1923	21st	Tauranga	Reform

From 1896 to 1908 he served as Member of Parliament for Bay of Plenty until 1908 when it was replaced with the Tauranga electorate, which he represented until his death in 1923. A conservative politician, he was an independent until 1908, when the Reform Party was established. He was knighted for his service in 1920, as a Knight Commander of the Order of St Michael and St George (KCMG) in the 1920 New Year Honours.

The Herries travelled to England in 1912; they left on 21 March on the Iconic. The journey was a disaster, though. Just before they left, his mother died in New Zealand. His wife, who had been in indifferent health, died on the journey to England.

He was the Minister of Native Affairs from 1912 to February 1921, Minister of Railways from 1912 to 1919, Minister of Marine and Minister of Customs from 1919 to February 1921, and Minister of Labour from 1920 to February 1921 in the Reform Government.

He died in Wellington on 22 February 1923.

== Legacy ==
Herriesville was named after Herries. The Herries Memorial Park in Te Aroha is named after Herries and established by a bequeathment from his will.

Sir James Parr said of Herries:

It was a strange environment for a man of his type, for he was a scion of a great English family whose name is famous in English parliamentary history. Fresh from the ancient seat of learning — Cambridge — he was thrown suddenly into a backblock area. A remarkably fine spirit, a genius for adapting himself to his environment and circumstances — these qualities were revealed in Sir William Herries. Within twelve months he was the best-liked man in that district

== Footnotes ==
Political offices
Preceded by Arthur Myers	Minister of Railways; 1912–1919	Succeeded by William Massey
New Zealand Parliament
Preceded by William Kelly	Member of Parliament for Bay of Plenty; 1896–1908	Succeeded by William MacDonald
In abeyance Title last held by William Kelly	Member of Parliament for Tauranga; 1908–1923	Succeeded by Charles Macmillan
