= 1908 New Zealand general election =

- 17 November to 2 December 1908

All 80 seats in the New Zealand House of Representatives 41 seats were needed for a majority
- Turnout: 79.8%
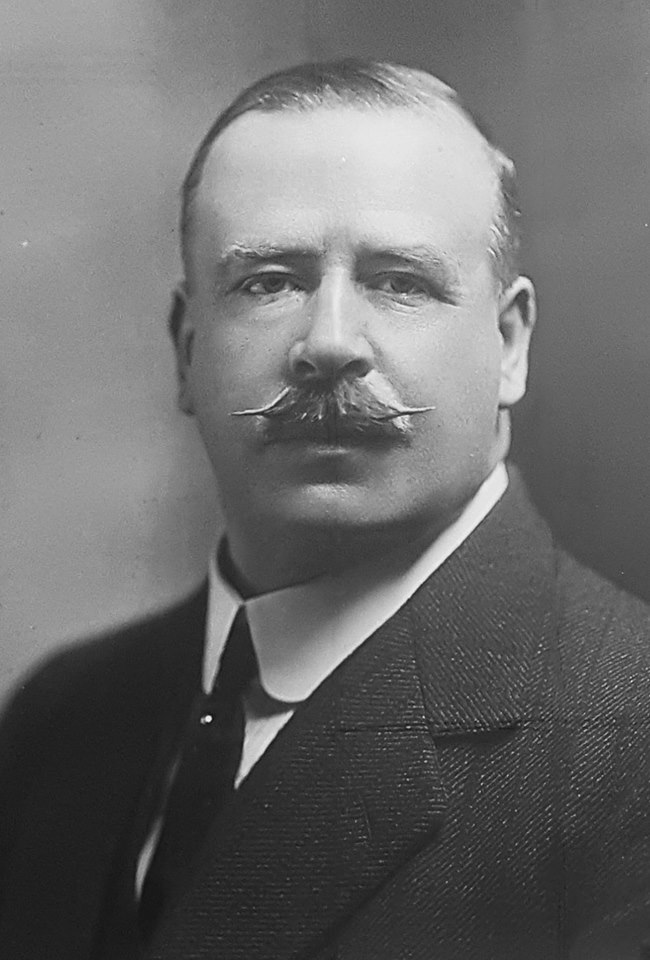

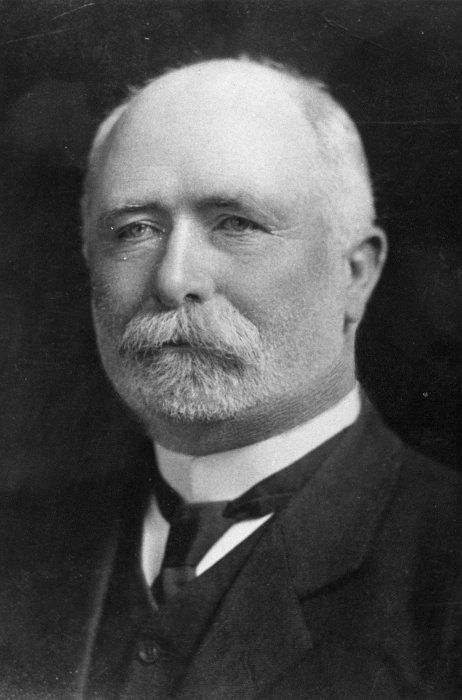

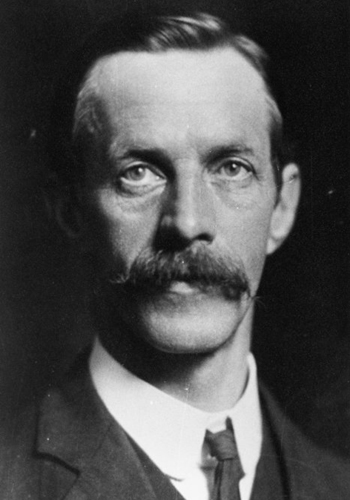
	First party	Second party	Third party
Leader	Joseph Ward	William Massey	David McLaren
Party	Liberal	Conservative	Ind. Labour League
Leader since	6 August 1906	11 September 1903	1908
Leader's seat	Awarua	Franklin	Wellington East
Last election	58 seats	16 seats	0 seats
Seats won	50	26	1
Seat change	▼8	▲10	▲1
Popular vote	315,220	149,286	16,974
Percentage	58.7%	27.8%	3.1%
Swing	▲5.6%	▼1.9%	▲2.3%
- Results of the election.
Prime Minister before election
Joseph Ward
Liberal
Subsequent Prime Minister
Joseph Ward
Liberal

The 1908 New Zealand general election was held on Tuesday, 17 and 24 November and 1 December in the general electorates, and on Wednesday, 2 December in the Māori electorates to elect a total of 80 MPs to the 17th session of the New Zealand Parliament. A total number of 537,003 (79.8%) voters turned out to vote.

== Changes to the electoral law ==
The Second Ballot Act 1908 provided for second or runoff ballots between the top two candidates where the top candidate did not get an absolute majority. The second ballot was held 7 days after the first ballot except in 10 large rural seats, where 14 days were allowed. In 1908, 22 second ballots were held on 24 November and 1 (Bay of Plenty) on 1 December. At the 1911 election, all 30 second ballots were held 7 days later. Two 1909 by-elections (in Rangitikei and Thames) also required second ballots.

The Second Ballot Act of 1908, which did not apply to the Maori electorates, was repealed in 1913.

== Results ==
=== Party totals ===
The following table gives party strengths and vote distribution.

Election results
Party	Candidates	Total votes	Percentage	Seats won	Change
Liberal	108	315,220	58.7	50	-8
Conservative	53	149,286	27.8	26	+10
Ind. Labour League	11	16,974	3.1	1	+1
Socialist	5	2,521	0.6	0	±0
Independent	45	50,478	9.4	3	-1

=== Votes summary ===
Popular Vote
Liberal	58.7%
Conservative	27.8%
Ind. Labour League	3.1%
Socialist	0.6%
Independents	9.4%

Parliament seats
Liberal	62.50%
Conservative	32.50%
Ind. Labour League	1.25%
Independents	3.75%

== Electorate results ==
The following are the results of the 1908 general election:

Key

Liberal Conservative Ind. Labour League Independent Liberal Liberal–Labour Independent

Electorate results for the 1908 New Zealand general election
Electorate	Incumbent	Winner	Majority	Runner up
General electorates (Note: † in Majority column depicts electorates in which a second ballot was held.)
Ashburton	John McLachlan	William Nosworthy	747†	Frederick Flatman
Auckland Central	Alfred Kidd	Albert Glover	2,540	Alfred Kidd
Auckland East	Frederick Baume		1,096	William Richardson
Auckland West	Charles Poole		1,455	Robert Thompson
Avon	William Tanner	George Russell	541†	William Tanner
Awarua	Joseph Ward		2,183	William Morris
Bay of Islands	Robert Houston	Vernon Reed	265	John Charles Johnson
Bay of Plenty	William Herries	William MacDonald	446†	James Gow
Bruce	James Allen		1,393	Joseph Mosley
Buller	James Colvin		997	Fergus Ferguson Munro
Chalmers	Edmund Allen	Edward Henry Clark	226	Edmund Allen
Christchurch East	Thomas Davey		1,666	James McCombs
Christchurch North	Charles Gray	Tommy Taylor	1,698	Charles Gray
Christchurch South	Harry Ell (Note: Harry Ell was previously associated with the Liberal Party.)		1,273	Jim Thorn
Clutha	Alexander Malcolm		1,799	Frank Isitt
Dunedin Central	John A. Millar	James Arnold	1,512	John McDonald
Dunedin North	Alfred Barclay	George Thomson	6	Alfred Barclay
Dunedin South	James Arnold	Thomas Sidey	1,830	Robert Rutherford Douglas
Dunedin West	New electorate	John A. Millar	2,447	Jim Munro
Eden	John Bollard		2,164	John Shackelford
Egmont	Bill Jennings	Bradshaw Dive	249	George Wake
Ellesmere	Heaton Rhodes		902	George Rennie
Franklin	William Massey		1,187	John McLarin
Geraldine	Frederick Flatman	Thomas Buxton	92	William Jeffries
Gisborne	New electorate	James Carroll	734	George Darton
Grey	Arthur Guinness		1,115	James Kerr (Note: For some biographical details of James Kerr refer to his father's article)
Grey Lynn	George Fowlds		889	Oliver Nicholson
Hawke's Bay	Alfred Dillon		704	William Russell
Hurunui	Andrew Rutherford	George Forbes	597	Obed Clothier
Hutt	Thomas Wilford		1,538	Richard Shortt
Invercargill	Josiah Hanan		848	Arthur Paape
Kaiapoi	David Buddo		77	Richard Moore
Kaipara	John Stallworthy		283	Alfred Harding
Lyttelton	George Laurenson		803	Henry Thacker
Manawatu	Jack Stevens	Edward Newman	585	Jack Stevens
Manukau	Frederic Lang		1,369	Alfred Creamer
Marsden	Francis Mander		704	James Harrison
Masterton	Alexander Hogg		1,248	John Hunter
Mataura	Robert McNab	George Anderson	366	Robert McNab
Motueka	Roderick McKenzie		1,501	Frederick Smith
Napier	Alfred Fraser	Vigor Brown	1,035	Alfred Fraser
Nelson	John Graham		14	Harry Atmore
Oamaru	Tom Duncan		613	James Mitchell
Ohinemuri	Hugh Poland		692†	Frederick Haselden
Oroua	Frank Lethbridge	David Guthrie	941	Owen Pleasants
Otaki	William Hughes Field	William Hughes Field	93	Byron Brown
Pahiatua	Bob Ross		264	James Cooper
Palmerston	William Wood	David Buick	81†	William Wood
Parnell	Frank Lawry		219	Edward Moss
Patea	Walter Symes	George Pearce	252	Charles E. Major
Rangitikei	Arthur Remington		158	Robbie Smith
Riccarton	George Witty		1,600	George Sheat
Selwyn	Charles Hardy		383	Joseph Ivess
Stratford	New electorate	John Hine	724	Walter Symes
Taranaki	Henry Okey		1,295	William Malone
Taieri	Donald Reid	Thomas Mackenzie	521	John Thomas Johnson
Taumarunui	New electorate	Bill Jennings	1,850	William Bowater
Tauranga	New electorate	William Herries	1,303	James Alexander Young
Thames	James McGowan		2,100	Ernest Deeble
Timaru	William Hall-Jones	James Craigie	380†	William David Campbell
Tuapeka	William Chapple	Robert Scott	697†	Jack MacPherson
Wairarapa	J. T. Marryat Hornsby	Wally Buchanan	136	J. T. Marryat Hornsby
Wairau	Charlie Mills	John Duncan	252	Robert McArtney
Waikato	Henry Greenslade		493	Allen Bell
Waipawa	Charles Hall		50	George Hunter
Waitaki	William Steward		329	Francis Henry Smith
Waitemata	Ewen Alison	Leonard Phillips	903†	William Joseph Napier
Wakatipu	William Fraser		1,151	Andrew Martin
Wallace	John Charles Thomson		1,346	Dugald MacPherson
Wanganui	James Thomas Hogan		742†	George Hutchison
Wellington Central	Francis Fisher		143	Thomas Hislop
Wellington East	John Aitken	David McLaren	427†	Arthur Atkinson
Wellington North	Charlie Izard	Alexander Herdman	826†	Frederick Bolton
Wellington South	New electorate	Robert Wright	558†	William Barber
Wellington Suburbs	New electorate	John Luke	1,148†	John Edward Fitzgerald
Westland	Tom Seddon		110	Henry Michel
Māori electorates (Note: The affiliation of many of the Māori candidates is unknown or uncertain; note that the Second Ballot Act 1908 did not apply to Māori constituencies.)
Eastern Maori	Āpirana Ngata		3,010	Tiki Paaka
Northern Maori	Hone Heke		1,045	Hare te Rangi
Southern Maori	Tame Parata		7	Teone Hopere Wharewiti Uru
Western Maori	Henare Kaihau		757	Pepene Eketone

Table footnotes:

== Summary of changes ==
- A boundary redistribution resulted in the abolition of seven seats:
  - Caversham, held by Thomas Sidey
  - Courtenay, held by Charles Lewis
  - Hawera, held by Charles E. Major
  - Mount Ida, held by Jack MacPherson
  - Newtown, held by William Barber
  - Waiapu, held by James Carroll
  - Waikouaiti, held by Thomas Mackenzie
- At the same time, seven new seats came into being:
  - Dunedin West
  - Gisborne
  - Stratford
  - Taumarunui
  - Tauranga
  - Wellington South
  - Wellington Suburbs
