= 1920 New Year Honours (New Zealand) =

Annual awards for New Zealanders

The 1920 New Year Honours in New Zealand were appointments by King George V on the advice of the New Zealand government to various orders and honours to reward and highlight good works by New Zealanders. The awards celebrated the passing of 1919 and the beginning of 1920, and were announced on 1 January 1920.

The recipients of honours are displayed here as they were styled before their new honour.

== Order of Saint Michael and Saint George ==
=== Knight Commander (KCMG) ===
- The Honourable William Herbert Herries – minister of railways and native affairs.
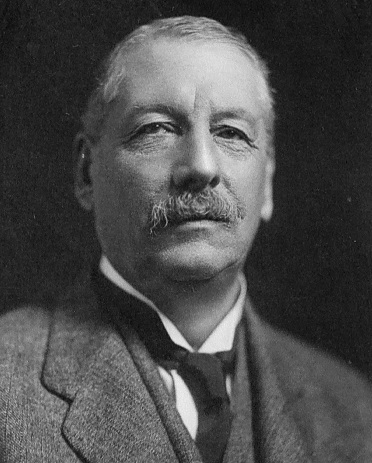
Sir William Herries

=== Companion (CMG) ===
- The Honourable Māui Pōmare – member of the Executive Council.
- Frank David Thomson – private secretary to the prime minister. For services in connection with the Peace Conference.
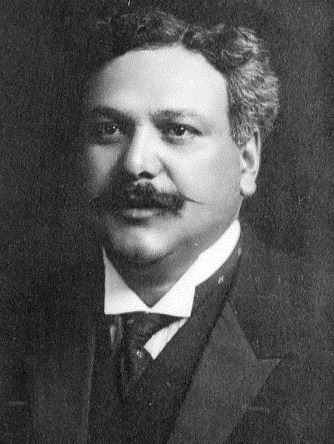
Māui Pōmare

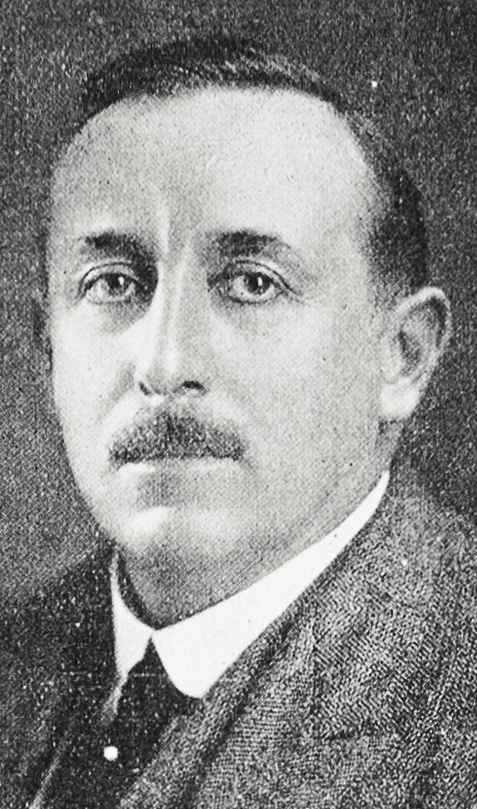
Frank Thomson

== Order of the British Empire ==
=== Knight Commander (KBE) ===
Civil division

- The Honourable Robert Heaton Rhodes. For services as New Zealand Red Cross commissioner in England, and in connection with the welfare of the troops of the Dominion.
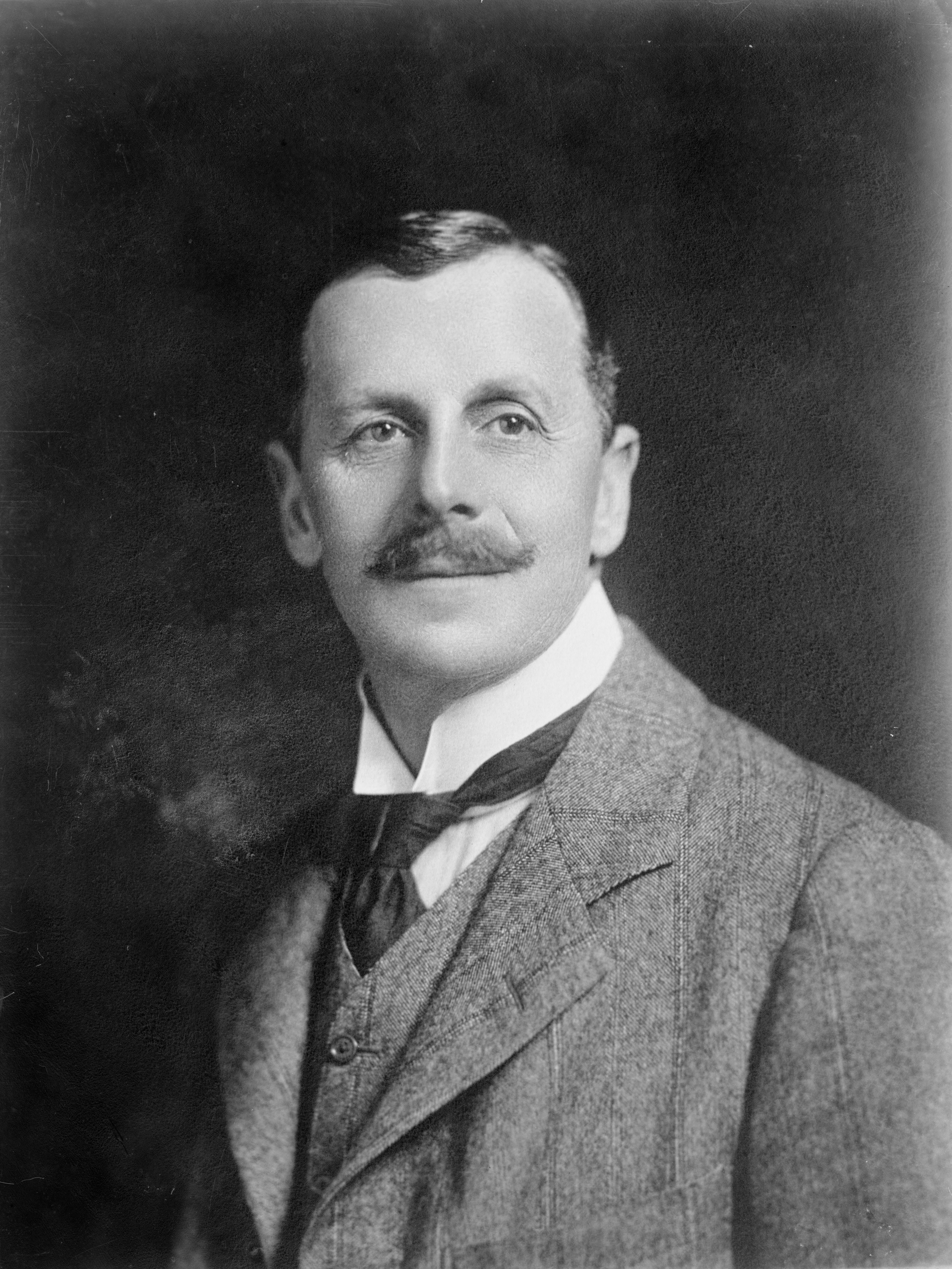
Sir Heaton Rhodes
