= Bay of Plenty (electorate) =

- Single-member general constituency for the New Zealand House of Representatives

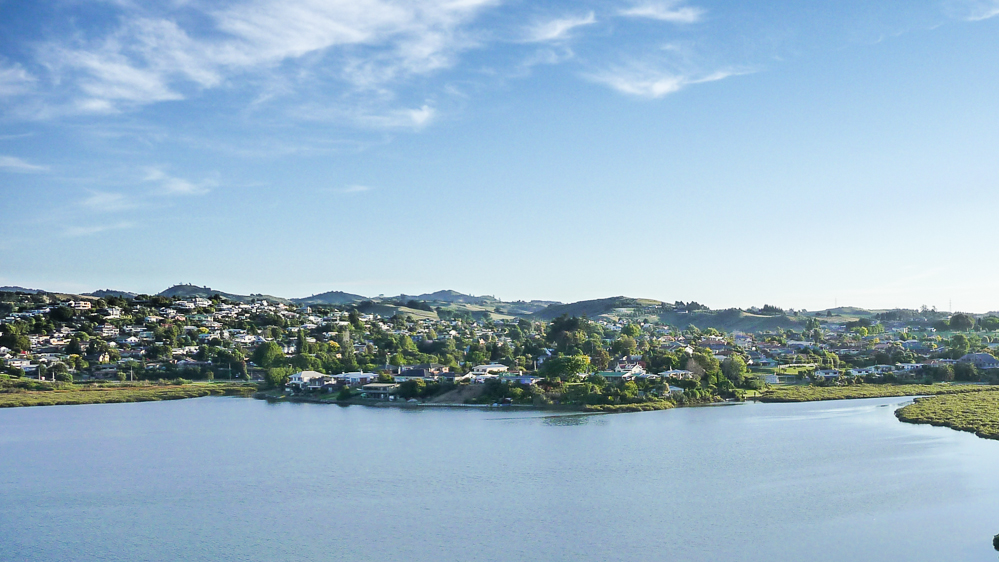
- Welcome Bay, located in the electorate
- Formation: 1893, 1996 (Note: Abolished 1978 to 1996)
- Region: Bay of Plenty
- Character: Suburban
- Term: 3 years

Member for Bay of Plenty

Bay of Plenty was a New Zealand electoral division returning one member to the New Zealand House of Representatives. It was abolished for the 2026 election. The final representative was Tom Rutherford of the National Party, first elected at the 2023 election.

== Population centres ==
In the 1892 electoral redistribution, population shift to the North Island required the transfer of one seat from the South Island to the north. The resulting ripple effect saw every electorate established in 1890 have its boundaries altered, and eight electorates were established for the first time, including Bay of Plenty.

Bay of Plenty was created for the change to the mixed-member proportional (MMP) representation voting system; it was carved out of parts of the old seats of Kaimai, Tarawera and Eastern Bay of Plenty. Its original incarnation was based mostly around Whakatane and Opotiki districts, with the remaining population coming from Te Puke and parts of greater Tauranga. The current Bay of Plenty electorate is wrapped around Tauranga city, but does not include the city. Up until the 2019–20 review, it included Matakana Island.

Prior to the 2007 boundary review, it did not extend to the western side of Tauranga or to Matakana Island. Instead it comprised a section of the central Bay of Plenty coast, from the eastern periphery of the Tauranga urban area to outside the main populated part of Whakatane. It included the towns of Te Puke, Edgecumbe and Papamoa. Rapid population growth around Tauranga has driven considerable boundary change at each review. For the 2008 election, the eastern boundary moved far westwards to the eastern fringe of Te Puke, in the process abandoning sections of the central coast to the Rotorua and East Coast seats.

== History ==
Bay of Plenty has been a safe seat for National's Tony Ryall, who has been returned easily at every election since the seat's re-establishment in 1996. The upper central North Island is an area where New Zealand First has done well, frequently getting a higher vote share in seats in both the Bay of Plenty region and in the Waikato than it does nationally.

The earlier Bay of Plenty electorate from 1893 to 1978 was held by William Kelly 1893–1896, William Herries 1896–1908, William MacDonald 1908–1920, Kenneth Williams 1920–1935, Gordon Hultquist 1935–1941, Bill Sullivan 1941–1957, Percy Allen 1957–1975 and Duncan MacIntyre 1975–1978. Williams had the distinction of being returned unopposed in three general elections, 1922, 1925 and 1931; in 1928 he was opposed by Alexander Moncur for Labour.

The electorate will be renamed to Mount Maunganui for the 2026 New Zealand general election.

=== Members of Parliament ===
Unless otherwise stated, all MPs terms began and ended at general elections.

Key

Conservative	Liberal	Reform
Labour	National	NZ First

Election	Winner
1893 election	William Kelly
1896 election	William Herries
1899 election	William Herries
1902 election	William Herries
1905 election	William Herries
1908 election	William MacDonald^{1}
1911 election	William MacDonald^{1}
1914 election	William MacDonald^{1}
1919 election	William MacDonald^{1}
1920 by-election	Kenneth Williams^{1}
1922 election	Kenneth Williams^{1}
1925 election	Kenneth Williams^{1}
1928 election	Kenneth Williams^{1}
1931 election	Kenneth Williams^{1}
1935 election	Gordon Hultquist^{2}
1938 election	Gordon Hultquist^{2}
1941 by-election	Bill Sullivan^{3}
1943 election	Bill Sullivan^{3}
1946 election	Bill Sullivan^{3}
1949 election	Bill Sullivan^{3}
1951 election	Bill Sullivan^{3}
1954 election	Bill Sullivan^{3}
1957 by-election	Percy Allen
1957 election	Percy Allen
1960 election	Percy Allen
1963 election	Percy Allen
1966 election	Percy Allen
1969 election	Percy Allen
1972 election	Percy Allen
1975 election	Duncan MacIntyre
Electorate abolished; see East Cape
1996 election	Tony Ryall
1999 election	Tony Ryall
2002 election	Tony Ryall
2005 election	Tony Ryall
2008 election	Tony Ryall
2011 election	Tony Ryall
2014 election	Todd Muller
2017 election	Todd Muller
2020 election	Todd Muller
2023 election	Tom Rutherford
(Electorate abolished in 2026; see Mount Maunganui)

|} ^{1} Died in office
^{2} Died of illness while on military service
^{3} Resigned during term

=== List MPs ===
Members of Parliament elected from party lists in elections where that person also unsuccessfully contested the Bay of Plenty electorate. Unless otherwise stated, all MPs terms began and ended at general elections.

Election	Winner
1996 election	Peter Brown
1999 election	Peter Brown
2002 election	Peter Brown
2005 election	Peter Brown
2017 election	Angie Warren-Clark
2020 election	Angie Warren-Clark
2023 election	Cameron Luxton

== Election results ==
=== 2023 election ===
2023 general election: Bay of Plenty
Notes:	Blue background denotes the winner of the electorate vote. Pink background denotes a candidate elected from their party list. Yellow background denotes an electorate win by a list member, or other incumbent. A ✓ or ✗ denotes status of any incumbent, win or lose respectively.						
Party	Candidate	Votes	%	±%	Party votes	%	±%
National	Tom Rutherford	23,303	51.64	+6.70	21,452	46.98	+14.41
Labour	Pare Taikato	7,898	17.50	−19.79	7,905	17.31	−25.49
ACT	Cameron Luxton	4,202	9.31	+4.67	5,212	11.41	+1.32
Green	Matthew MacMillan	4,036	8.94	+5.18	3,635	7.96	+3.20
NZ First	Kirsten Murfitt	4,025	8.02	+6.76	3,957	8.66	+5.66
Leighton Baker Party	Wendy Gillespie	524	1.16	—	58	0.13	—
Animal Justice	Caitlin Grattan	375	0.83	—	88	0.19	—
Independent	Taupo Wahed	204	0.45	—			
Opportunities					894	1.96	+0.30
NZ Loyal					714	1.56	—
Te Pāti Māori					577	1.26	+0.83
NewZeal					444	0.97	+0.79 (Note: Compared to ONE Party)
Legalise Cannabis					193	0.42	−0.12
Freedoms NZ					140	0.31	—
DemocracyNZ					79	0.17	—
New Conservative					56	0.12	−2.02
New Nation					24	0.05	—
Women's Rights					24	0.05	—
Informal votes		560			209		
Total valid votes		45,127			45,661		
National hold	Majority	15,405	34.13	+26.48			

=== 2020 election ===
2020 general election: Bay of Plenty
Notes:	Blue background denotes the winner of the electorate vote. Pink background denotes a candidate elected from their party list. Yellow background denotes an electorate win by a list member, or other incumbent. A ✓ or ✗ denotes status of any incumbent, win or lose respectively.						
Party	Candidate	Votes	%	±%	Party votes	%	±%
National	✓ Todd Muller	20,046	44.94	−16.11	14,758	32.57	−22.05
Labour	Angie Warren-Clark	16,631	37.29	+9.94	19,398	42.80	+17.30
ACT	Bruce Carley	2,068	4.64	+4.17	4,571	10.09	+9.60
Green	Pete Huggins	1,678	3.76	—	2,159	4.76	+0.74
NZ First	Tricia Jane Lawrence	963	2.16	−7.62	1,114	3.01	−7.76
Opportunities	Chris Jenkins	957	2.15	—	754	1.66	−1.52
New Conservative	Margaret Colmore	827	1.85	—	972	2.14	+1.89
Advance NZ	Angela Moncur	690	1.55	—	712	1.57	—
Legalise Cannabis	Christopher Coker	640	1.43	—	244	0.54	+0.27
ONE	Sharon Devery	103	0.23	—	83	0.18	—
Māori Party					195	0.43	−0.07
Outdoors					42	0.09	±0.00
Sustainable NZ					31	0.07	—
Vision NZ					29	0.06	—
Heartland					12	0.03	—
TEA					11	0.02	—
Social Credit					10	0.02	−0.01
Informal votes		605			250		
Total valid votes		44,603			45,318		
Turnout		45,663	86.68	+3.48			
National hold	Majority	3,415	7.66	−26.05			

=== 2017 election ===
2017 general election: Bay of Plenty
Notes:	Blue background denotes the winner of the electorate vote. Pink background denotes a candidate elected from their party list. Yellow background denotes an electorate win by a list member, or other incumbent. A ✓ or ✗ denotes status of any incumbent, win or lose respectively.						
Party	Candidate	Votes	%	±%	Party votes	%	±%
National	✓ Todd Muller	25,352	61.05	+0.36	23,164	54.62	−3.04
Labour	Angie Warren-Clark	11,356	27.34	+8.80	10,817	25.51	+12.44
NZ First	Lester Gray	4,060	9.78	−2.90	4,568	10.77	−3.17
Māori Party	Raewyn Bennett	563	1.36	—	214	0.50	−0.07
ACT	Bruce Carley	195	0.47	—	206	0.49	+0.24
Green					1,708	4.03	−3.20
Opportunities					1,349	3.18	—
Legalise Cannabis					113	0.27	−0.07
Conservative					106	0.25	−5.41
Outdoors					40	0.09	—
Ban 1080					40	0.09	−0.05
United Future					32	0.08	−0.13
People's Party					31	0.07	—
Democrats					12	0.03	−0.06
Mana Party					7	0.02	−0.19 (Note: 2017 Mana Party swing is relative to the votes for Internet-Mana in 2014; it shared a party list with the Internet Party in the 2014 election.)
Internet					3	0.01	−0.20 (Note: 2017 Internet Party swing is relative to the votes for Internet-Mana in 2014; it shared a party list with Mana Party in the 2014 election.)
Informal votes		423			140		
Total valid votes		41,526			42,410		
Turnout		42,550	83.20	+2.55			
National hold	Majority	13,996	34.00	−8.15			

=== 2014 election ===
2014 general election: Bay of Plenty
Notes:	Blue background denotes the winner of the electorate vote. Pink background denotes a candidate elected from their party list. Yellow background denotes an electorate win by a list member, or other incumbent. A ✓ or ✗ denotes status of any incumbent, win or lose respectively.						
Party	Candidate	Votes	%	±%	Party votes	%	±%
National	Todd Muller	21,735	60.69	−6.79	21,096	57.66	−0.14
Labour	Clare Wilson	6,639	18.54	+1.60	4,783	13.07	−0.69
NZ First	Ray Dolman	4,542	12.68	+2.14	5,100	13.94	+1.31
Conservative	Deborah Cunliffe	1,322	3.69	−0.03	2,072	5.66	+1.54
Independent Coalition	Brendan Horan	1,281	3.58	+3.58	104	0.28	+0.28
Democrats	Tracy Livingston	160	0.45	+0.45	33	0.09	+0.05
United Future	Ben Rickard	135	0.38	−0.23	78	0.21	−0.37
Green					2,645	7.23	−1.48
Māori Party					207	0.57	−0.02
Internet Mana					187	0.51	+0.51
Legalise Cannabis					126	0.34	−0.17
ACT					90	0.25	−0.91
Ban 1080					50	0.14	+0.14
Civilian					10	0.03	+0.03
Focus					6	0.02	+0.02
Informal votes		378			88		
Total valid votes		36,192			36,675		
Turnout		36,641	80.02	+2.03			
National hold	Majority	15,096	42.15	−8.78			

=== 2011 election ===
2011 general election: Bay of Plenty
Notes:	Blue background denotes the winner of the electorate vote. Pink background denotes a candidate elected from their party list. Yellow background denotes an electorate win by a list member, or other incumbent. A ✓ or ✗ denotes status of any incumbent, win or lose respectively.						
Party	Candidate	Votes	%	±%	Party votes	%	±%
National	✓ Tony Ryall	23,710	67.48	+2.61	20,853	57.80	−0.89
Labour	Carol Devoy-Heena	5,950	16.94	+0.86	4,965	13.76	−6.43
NZ First	Ray Dolman	3,704	10.54	−0.79	4,469	12.39	+4.13
Conservative	Peter Redman	1,306	3.72	+3.72	1,485	4.12	+4.12
Mana	Sharon Stevens	251	0.71	+0.71	91	0.25	+0.25
United Future	Brian Carter	213	0.61	+0.11	207	0.57	−0.13
Green					3,142	8.71	+3.84
ACT					418	1.16	−1.75
Māori Party					213	0.59	−0.11
Legalise Cannabis					183	0.51	+0.14
Libertarianz					29	0.08	+0.01
Democrats					13	0.04	−0.01
Alliance					9	0.02	−0.03
Informal votes		879			226		
Total valid votes		35,134			36,077		
National hold	Majority	17,760	50.55	+1.75			

Electorate (as at 26 November 2011): 46,546

=== 2008 election ===
2008 general election: Bay of Plenty
Notes:	Blue background denotes the winner of the electorate vote. Pink background denotes a candidate elected from their party list. Yellow background denotes an electorate win by a list member, or other incumbent. A ✓ or ✗ denotes status of any incumbent, win or lose respectively.						
Party	Candidate	Votes	%	±%	Party votes	%	±%
National	✓ Tony Ryall	23,402	64.88	+6.65	21,526	58.70	+9.57
Labour	Carol Devoy-Heena	5,798	16.07	−4.38	7,404	20.19	−7.89
NZ First	Peter Brown	4,087	11.33	−2.30	3,030	8.26	−3.79
Kiwi	Tony Christiansen	2,258	6.26	–	734	2.00	–
ACT	Francis Denz	346	0.96	–	1,067	2.91	+2.00
United Future	Brian Carter	180	0.50	−1.47	258	0.70	−3.19
Green					1,787	4.87	+1.55
Māori Party					258	0.70	+0.08
Progressive					175	0.48	−0.39
Bill and Ben					144	0.39	–
Legalise Cannabis					135	0.37	+0.20
Family Party					60	0.16	–
Libertarianz					25	0.07	+0.04
Alliance					21	0.06	+0.05
Democrats					18	0.05	+0.01
Pacific					17	0.05	–
RAM					9	0.02	–
RONZ					3	0.01	-0.00
Workers Party					3	0.01	–
Informal votes		325			118		
Total valid votes		36,071			36,674		
National hold	Majority	17,604	48.80	+11.03			

=== 2005 election ===
2005 general election: Bay of Plenty
Notes:	Blue background denotes the winner of the electorate vote. Pink background denotes a candidate elected from their party list. Yellow background denotes an electorate win by a list member, or other incumbent. A ✓ or ✗ denotes status of any incumbent, win or lose respectively.						
Party	Candidate	Votes	%	±%	Party votes	%	±%
National	✓ Tony Ryall	20,941	57.82		17,934	48.95	
Labour	Pauline Scott	7,357	20.31		10,252	27.98	
NZ First	Peter Brown	4,903	13.54		4,399	12.01	
Green	Ian Stephens	1,181	3.26		1,213	3.31	
United Future	Jeff Leigh	707	1.95		1,421	3.88	
Destiny	Roberta Maxwell	317	0.88		279	0.76	
Māori Party	Te Orohi Paul	314	0.87		226	0.62	
Progressive	Ronnie Stewart-Ward	217	0.60	–	316	0.86	
Direct Democracy	Mike Robertson	27	0.07		10	0.03	
ACT					332	0.91	
Legalise Cannabis					63	0.17	
Christian Heritage					20	0.05	
Democrats					13	0.04	
Libertarianz					12	0.03	
Family Rights					6	0.02	
RONZ					4	0.0	
99 MP					3	0.01	
Alliance					3	0.01	
One NZ					2	0.01	
Informal votes		129			255		
Total valid votes		36,219			36,637		
National hold	Majority	13,584	37.51				

=== 2002 election ===
2002 general election: Bay of Plenty
Notes:	Blue background denotes the winner of the electorate vote. Pink background denotes a candidate elected from their party list. Yellow background denotes an electorate win by a list member, or other incumbent. A ✓ or ✗ denotes status of any incumbent, win or lose respectively.						
Party	Candidate	Votes	%	±%	Party votes	%	±%
National	✓ Tony Ryall	12,975	42.95		7,130	23.29	
NZ First	Peter Brown	7,378	24.42		6,896	22.53	
Labour	Mei Matere Taare	6,494	21.49		9,457	30.89	
United Future	John Cassidy	1,231	4.07		2,506	8.19	
Green	Te Ruruanga Te Keeti	1,098	3.63		1,691	5.52	
Christian Heritage	Richard Holland	416	1.38		350	1.14	
ACT	Graham Douglas Steenson	371	1.23		1,451	4.74	
Progressive	John Neill	249	0.82		239	0.78	
ORNZ					569	1.86	
Christian Heritage					350	1.14	
Alliance					162	0.53	
Legalise Cannabis					122	0.40	
One NZ					15	0.05	
Mana Māori					13	0.04	
NMP					3	0.01	
Informal votes		214			86		
Total valid votes		30,212			30,611		
National hold	Majority	5,597	18.53				

=== 1999 election ===
1999 general election: Bay of Plenty
Notes:	Blue background denotes the winner of the electorate vote. Pink background denotes a candidate elected from their party list. Yellow background denotes an electorate win by a list member, or other incumbent. A ✓ or ✗ denotes status of any incumbent, win or lose respectively.						
Party	Candidate	Votes	%	±%	Party votes	%	±%
National	✓ Tony Ryall	15,781	46.00		11,350	32.91	
Labour	Terry Hughes	8,679	25.30		11,342	32.89	
NZ First	Peter Brown	4,185	12.20		3,178	9.22	
Green	Margaret Collins	1,815	5.29		1,847	5.36	
Alliance	John Neill	1,338	3.90		1,769	5.13	
Christian Democrats	Judy Turner	1,161	3.38		1,210	3.51	
Christian Heritage	Joyce Stevens	659	1.92		795	2.31	
ACT	Lynne Cook	520	1.52		2,138	6.20	
Te Tawharau	Willie Coates	100	0.29				
Natural Law	Meike van Batenburg	70	0.20		28	0.08	
Legalise Cannabis					255	0.74	
United NZ					181	0.52	
Libertarianz					139	0.40	
One NZ					72	0.21	
Mana Māori					57	0.17	
McGillicuddy Serious					50	0.14	
Animals First					41	0.12	
NMP					8	0.02	
Freedom Movement					6	0.02	
People's Choice Party					6	0.02	
Mauri Pacific					5	0.01	
South Island					4	0.01	
Republican					3	0.01	
Informal votes		448			272		
Total valid votes		34,308			34,484		
National hold	Majority	7,102					

=== 1996 election ===
1996 general election: Bay of Plenty
Notes:	Blue background denotes the winner of the electorate vote. Pink background denotes a candidate elected from their party list. Yellow background denotes an electorate win by a list member, or other incumbent. A ✓ or ✗ denotes status of any incumbent, win or lose respectively.						
Party	Candidate	Votes	%	±%	Party votes	%	±%
National	Tony Ryall	13,923	42.63		11,387	34.73	
NZ First	Peter Brown	8,770	26.85		7,237	22.07	
Labour	Julie Tucker	5,354	16.39		7,016	21.40	
Alliance	Jim Bennett	2,609	7.99		2,732	8.33	
Christian Coalition	Judy Turner	1,253	3.84		1,884	5.75	
ACT	Reg Turner	359	1.10		1,513	4.61	
McGillicuddy Serious	Mark Servian	225	0.69		108	0.33	
Te Tawharau	Rangitukehu David Paul	78	0.24		42	0.13	
Natural Law	Lew Cormack	67	0.21		44	0.13	
Progressive Greens	Graeme Leech	24	0.07		65	0.20	
Legalise Cannabis					446	1.36	
United NZ					169	0.52	
Animals First					51	0.16	
Superannuitants & Youth					33	0.10	
Mana Māori					19	0.06	
Green Society					17	0.05	
Conservatives					12	0.04	
Libertarianz					10	0.03	
Advance New Zealand					4	0.01	
Asia Pacific United					1	0.00	
Ethnic Minority Party					1	0.00	
Informal votes		246			117		
Total valid votes		32,662			32,791		
National win new seat	Majority	5,153	15.78				

=== 1957 by-election ===
1957 Bay of Plenty by-election
Party	Candidate	Votes	%	±%
National	Percy Allen	5,290	53.99	
Labour	Godfrey Santon	4,091	41.75	
Liberal Federation	Reginald Joseph Pedley	417	4.26	
Majority		1,199	12.24	
Informal votes		35	0.36	
Turnout		9,233	72.15	
Registered electors		13,628		
National hold		Swing		

=== 1941 by-election ===
1941 Bay of Plenty by-election
Party	Candidate	Votes	%	±%
National	Bill Sullivan	4,675	60.72	+11.91
Labour	Charles Mills	3,024	39.27	
Informal votes		136	1.76	+1.11
Majority		1,651	21.44	
Turnout		7,699	83.48	−9.03
Registered electors		9,222		

=== 1938 election ===
1938 general election: Bay of Plenty
Party	Candidate	Votes	%	±%
Labour	Gordon Hultquist	4,964	50.54	+7.43
National	Bill Sullivan	4,795	48.81	
Informal votes		65	0.65	−0.10
Majority		169	1.72	−5.08
Turnout		9,821	92.51	−2.91
Registered electors		10,616		

=== 1935 election ===
1935 general election: Bay of Plenty
Party	Candidate	Votes	%	±%
Labour	Gordon Hultquist	3,519	43.11	
United	John Tom Merry	2,964	36.31	
Democrat	Harry Harker	1,678	20.56	
Informal votes		62	0.75	
Majority		555	6.80	
Turnout		8,161	89.60	
Registered electors		9,108		

=== 1928 election ===
1928 general election: Bay of Plenty
Party	Candidate	Votes	%	±%
Reform	Kenneth Williams	4,463	63.22	
Labour	Alexander Moncur	2,596	36.78	
Informal votes		93	1.30	
Majority		1,867	26.45	
Turnout		7,152	79.09	
Registered electors		9,043		

=== 1920 by-election ===
1920 Bay of Plenty by-election
Party	Candidate	Votes	%	±%
Reform	Kenneth Williams	2,381	57.93	
Liberal	Frederick John Lysnar	1,729	42.07	
Majority		652	15.86	
Turnout		4,110		

=== 1919 election ===
1919 general election: Bay of Plenty
Party	Candidate	Votes	%	±%
Liberal	William MacDonald	3,546	59.85	+3.06
Reform	Kenneth Williams	2,312	39.02	−4.18
Informal votes		66	1.11	−0.21
Majority		1,234	20.83	+7.52
Turnout		5,924	70.22	−10.32
Registered electors		8,436		

=== 1914 election ===
1914 general election: Bay of Plenty
Party	Candidate	Votes	%	±%
Liberal	William MacDonald	4,033	56.79	+2.79
Reform	Kenneth Williams	3,068	43.20	
Informal votes		94	1.32	+0.22
Majority		965	13.58	+4.49
Turnout		7,101	80.54	+5.32
Registered electors		8,816		

=== 1911 election ===
1911 general election: Bay of Plenty
Party	Candidate	Votes	%	±%
Liberal	William MacDonald	3,177	54.00	−0.59
Reform	Harry De Lautour	2,642	44.90	
Informal votes		65	1.10	+0.57
Majority		535	9.09	−0.09
Turnout		5,884	75.22	+3.59
Registered electors		7,822		

=== 1908 election ===
1908 general election: Bay of Plenty, first ballot
Party	Candidate	Votes	%	±%
Liberal	William MacDonald	2,413	46.65	
Conservative	James Gow	1,970	37.27	
Independent	David Lundon	902	17.06	
Informal votes		79	1.49	
Majority		443	8.38	
Turnout		5,285	77.99	−4.41
Second ballot result
Liberal	William MacDonald	2,650	54.59	+7.94
Conservative	James Gow	2,204	45.40	+8.13
Informal votes		26	0.53	−0.96
Majority		446	9.18	+0.80
Turnout		4,854	71.63	−6.36
Registered electors		6,776		

=== 1905 election ===
1905 general election: Bay of Plenty
Party	Candidate	Votes	%	±%
Conservative	William Herries	3,251	51.23	+2.84
Liberal	Joseph Foster	3,040	47.91	
Majority		211	3.32	−6.26
Turnout		6,345	82.40	+6.29
Registered electors		7,700		

=== 1902 election ===
1902 general election: Bay of Plenty
Party	Candidate	Votes	%	±%
Conservative	William Herries	2,110	48.39	−4.87
Liberal	David Lundon	1,434	32.88	−13.68
Independent	Charles Jordan	429	9.83	
Independent	John Ede Taylor	387	8.87	
Majority		676	9.58	+3.07
Turnout		4,360	76.11	−6.67
Registered electors		5,728		

=== 1899 election ===
1899 general election: Bay of Plenty
Party	Candidate	Votes	%	±%
Conservative	William Herries	2,110	53.26	+1.10
Liberal	David Lundon	1,852	46.74	
Majority		258	6.51	+2.21
Turnout		3,962	82.78	+5.09
Registered electors		4,786		

=== 1896 election ===
1896 general election: Bay of Plenty
Party	Candidate	Votes	%	±%
Conservative	William Herries	1,600	52.15	
Liberal	William Kelly	1,468	47.85	+6.86
Majority		132	4.30	+3.64
Turnout		3,068	77.69	+9.64
Registered electors		3,949		

=== 1893 election ===
1893 general election: Bay of Plenty
Party	Candidate	Votes	%	±%
Liberal	William Kelly	1,162	40.99	
Conservative	Henry Burton	953	33.62	
Liberal	Charles Jordan	583	20.56	
Independent	George Vesey Stewart	116	4.09	
Independent	Thomas Mace Humphreys	19	0.67	
Liberal	William Fraser	2	0.07	
Majority		209	7.37	
Turnout		2,835	68.05	
Registered electors		4,166		

== Bibliography ==
- The General Election, 1908. National Library. 1909.
- Bassett, Michael (1982). Three Party Politics in New Zealand 1911–1931. Auckland: Historical Publications. ISBN 0-86870-006-1.
- McRobie, Alan (1989). Electoral Atlas of New Zealand. Wellington: GP Books. ISBN 0-477-01384-8.
- Norton, Clifford (1988). New Zealand parliamentary election results, 1946–1987. Wellington: Victoria University of Wellington Department of Political Science. ISBN 0-475-11200-8.
- Wilson, Jim (1985) [First published in 1913]. New Zealand Parliamentary Record, 1840–1984 (4th ed.). Wellington: V.R. Ward, Govt. Printer. OCLC 154283103.
