= William Nosworthy =

New Zealand politician (1867–1946)

The Honourable Sir William Nosworthy KCMG
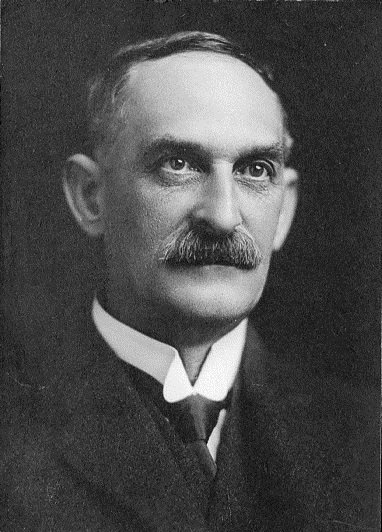

4th Minister of External Affairs
- In office 24 May 1926 – 24 August 1928
- Prime Minister: Gordon Coates
- Preceded by: Francis Bell
- Succeeded by: Gordon Coates

23rd Minister of Finance
- In office 14 May 1925 – 24 May 1926
- Prime Minister: Francis Bell; Gordon Coates
- Preceded by: William Massey
- Succeeded by: William Downie Stewart

8th Minister of Agriculture
- In office 4 September 1919 – 21 January 1926
- Prime Minister: William Massey; Francis Bell; Gordon Coates
- Preceded by: William MacDonald
- Succeeded by: Oswald Hawken

Member of the New Zealand Parliament for Ashburton
- In office 2 December 1908 – 14 November 1928
- Preceded by: John McLachlan
- Succeeded by: electorate abolished

Personal details
- Born: 18 October 1867 Christchurch, New Zealand
- Died: 26 September 1946 (aged 78) Ashburton, New Zealand
- Party: Reform
- Spouse: Lilian Kate Wright (m. 1909)
- Relations: Edward George Wright (father-in-law)

Sir William Nosworthy KCMG (18 October 1867 – 26 September 1946) was a New Zealand politician. He briefly served as Minister of Finance and then Minister of External Affairs in the Reform Government.

== Biography ==
=== Early life ===
Nosworthy was born on 18 October 1867 at the Christchurch suburb of St Albans. He was educated at private schools including Christchurch Boys' High School. He was then a farmer at Amuri and Gisborne. In 1895 he returned to Canterbury and farmed with his brother at Waitohi Downs. In 1900 they purchased Whakara, part of the Anama station. In 1917 he purchased the Mesopotamia Station initially owned by the novelist Samuel Butler.

He married Lilian Kate Wright, daughter of Edward George Wright. They had no children.

=== Political career ===
New Zealand Parliament
Years	Term	Electorate	Party
1908–1909	18th	Ashburton	Independent
1909–1911	Changed allegiance to:		Reform
1911–1914	19th	Ashburton	Reform
1914–1919	20th	Ashburton	Reform
1919–1922	21st	Ashburton	Reform
1922–1925	22nd	Ashburton	Reform
1925–1928	23rd	Ashburton	Reform

Nosworthy stood in the Ashburton electorate in the 1908 election. The Second Ballot Act was in force and on election night, he was in third place behind David Jones. Nosworthy encouraged his supporters to vote for Jones in the second ballot. After a recount, the situation was reversed (Nosworthy was 30 votes ahead) and Jones advertised for his supporters to vote for Nosworthy, and indeed, Nosworthy was successful in the second ballot. In 1912 he became the junior government whip.

He was first appointed to Cabinet in 1919, being appointed Minister of Agriculture (1919–1925) and then Minister of Immigration (1920–1925) by Prime Minister William Massey. When Massey died in 1925, Nosworthy gained the more important role of Minister of Finance in the interim government of Francis Bell.

Nosworthy contested the leadership ballot to succeed Massey, but was defeated by Gordon Coates. He continued to serve as Minister of Finance until the following year, when he was given the Minister of External Affairs portfolio instead (1926–1928). He held this position until 1928. There was rumours that Coates wished to drop Nosworthy from cabinet in his post-1925 election reshuffle. Newspapers thought he along with several others would be dropped and the Governor-General, Sir Charles Fergusson, also disliked Nosworthy thinking him 'boring'. However as Coates had entered cabinet at the same time as Nosworthy and in recognition that he had stood for the leadership, Coates thought it would be too bad of a look to dump him as a minister. As Minister of External Affairs he was in charge of Samoa where disaffection among locals with the Mau movement. He opposed the movement demand for self governance and determination, supporting the Administrator of Western Samoa, George Spafford Richardson, to deal with increasing civil unrest.

Nosworthy retired from parliament at the 1928 election, serving through six terms of Parliament.

He was appointed a Knight Commander of the Order of St Michael and St George in the 1929 New Year Honours, and was awarded the King George V Silver Jubilee Medal in 1935.

=== Later life and death ===
He died at his home on 26 September 1946 in Ashburton, aged 78. He was survived by his wife.

== Notes ==
Political offices
Preceded by James Parr	Postmaster-General and Minister of Telegraphs; 1926–1928	Succeeded by James Donald
New Zealand Parliament
Preceded by John McLachlan	Member of Parliament for Ashburton; 1908–1928	In abeyance Title next held by Geoff Gerard
