= New Zealand Representative Party =

Proposed New Zealand Representative Party logo

The New Zealand Representative Party was a political party in New Zealand. The party's leader was Reg Turner, a former candidate for the ACT Party as well as a former independent candidate.

The party claimed to have no policies and to oppose traditional left-right politics. Despite these claims, it also promoted populist referendums, deregulation, compulsory military service, "stopping the culture for young unmarried women to have babies", and restricting the welfare state.

The NZRP believed that list MPs in New Zealand's mixed member proportional electoral system are not properly accountable to voters. As a result, it would run only electorate candidates, and promised to support the party chosen by the majority of the electorate.

The party applied to register its logo with the Electoral Commission, but the application was refused as the logo could confuse voters.

The party ran only a single candidate, Turner in the 2008 election. Turner ran in the West Coast-Tasman electorate and received 62 votes (0.18%).

By 2010, the party's website was defunct. It did not run any candidates in the 2011 election. Turner continued to be involved in politics; in 2015 he was removed from Tasman District Council chambers by police and served a trespass notice after refusing to limit a submission to three minutes and refusing to leave, and he stood for Tasman District Council in 2016 without success.
