= Heaton Rhodes =

New Zealand politician (1861–1956)

The Honourable Sir Heaton Rhodes KCVO KBE GCStJ VD
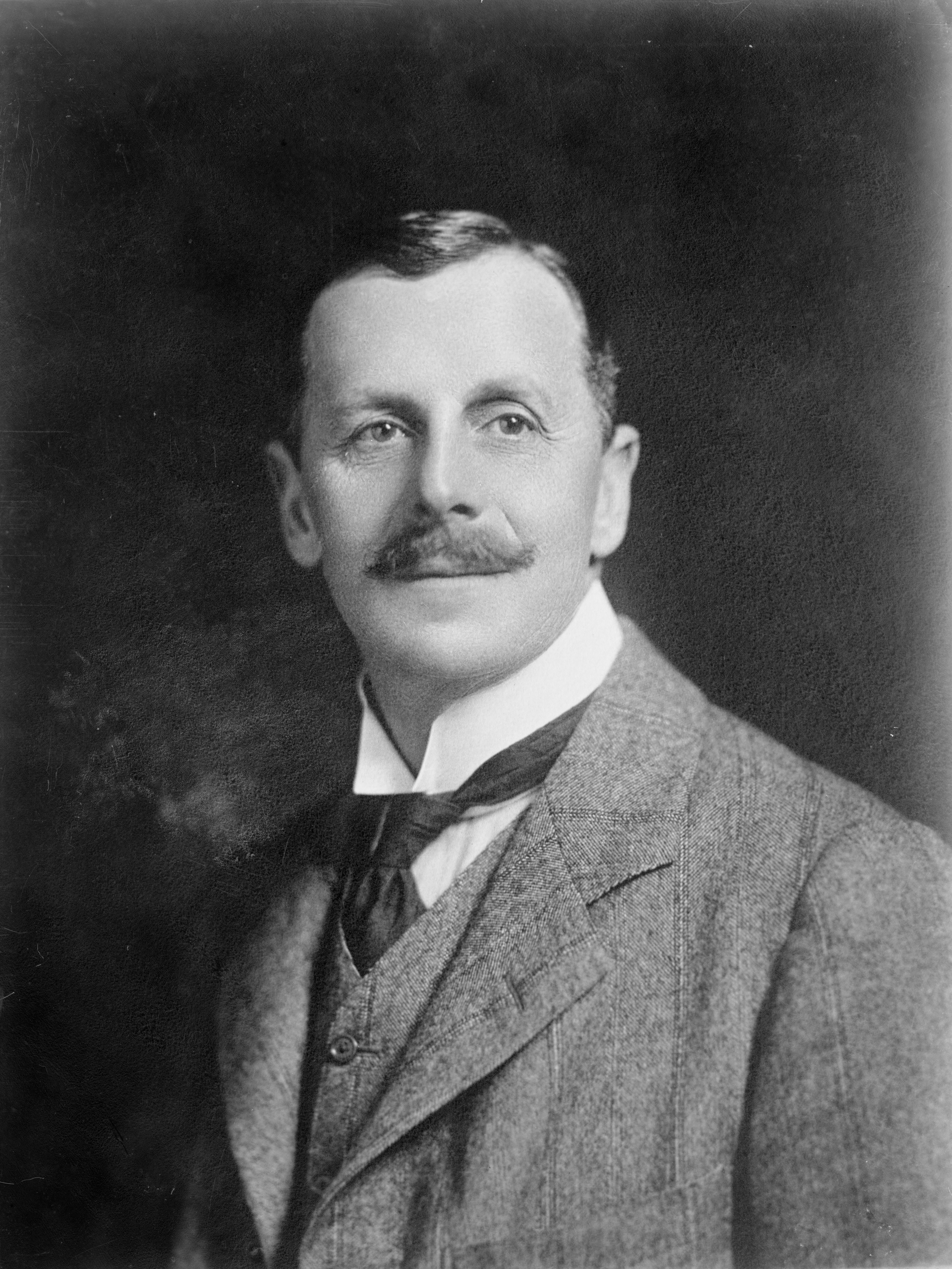
- Heaton Rhodes in 1915

Member of the New Zealand Parliament for Ellesmere
- In office 6 December 1899 – 14 October 1925

Personal details
- Born: 27 February 1861 Purau, Banks Peninsula
- Died: 30 July 1956 (aged 95) Taitapu, Banks Peninsula
- Relations: Robert Heaton Rhodes (father)

Sir Robert Heaton Rhodes KCVO KBE GCStJ VD (27 February 1861 – 30 July 1956) was a New Zealand politician and lawyer.

== Life ==
Rhodes was born in Purau on Banks Peninsula, the son of sheep farmer and politician Robert Heaton Rhodes. He went to England to attend Hereford Cathedral School and then studied at Brasenose College, Oxford, from which he graduated in 1884. He was called to the bar by the Inner Temple in 1887.

He then returned to New Zealand, joined the New Zealand Mounted Rifles Brigade, and served in the Second Boer War in 1902 with the 8th New Zealand Contingent. He later went on to command the 1st Mounted Rifles in the New Zealand Territorial Force. After retirement he was Honorary Colonel of the 1st Mounted Rifles.

New Zealand Parliament
Years	Term	Electorate	Party
1899–1902	14th	Ellesmere	Independent
1902–1905	15th	Ellesmere	Independent
1905–1908	16th	Ellesmere	Independent
1908–1909	17th	Ellesmere	Independent
1909–1911	Changed allegiance to:		Reform
1911–1914	18th	Ellesmere	Reform
1914–1919	19th	Ellesmere	Reform
1919–1922	20th	Ellesmere	Reform
1922–1925	21st	Ellesmere	Reform

Rhodes represented the Ellesmere electorate in the House of Representatives from 1899 to 1925, during which time he joined the Reform Party. He retired in 1925 and was appointed to the Legislative Council, in which he served until 1941, with a short break between 1932 and 1934.

He served as Postmaster-General and Minister for Public Health, Hospitals and Tourist Resorts in the Cabinet from 1912 to 1915, when he was appointed Special Commissioner to Egypt and Galilee to report on the conditions of New Zealand troops serving there. In 1916, he moved to Europe as Commissioner of the New Zealand Red Cross.

In 1920, Rhodes returned to New Zealand and was appointed Minister of Defence. In 1922, he was also appointed as Commissioner of State Forests and held both posts until 1926. From 1926 to 1928, Rhodes was Deputy Leader of the Legislative Council and minister without portfolio. In 1927, he was Minister in attendance upon the Duke and Duchess of York on their visit to New Zealand. He was vice-president of the Victoria League for Commonwealth Friendship in Canterbury in the 1930s.

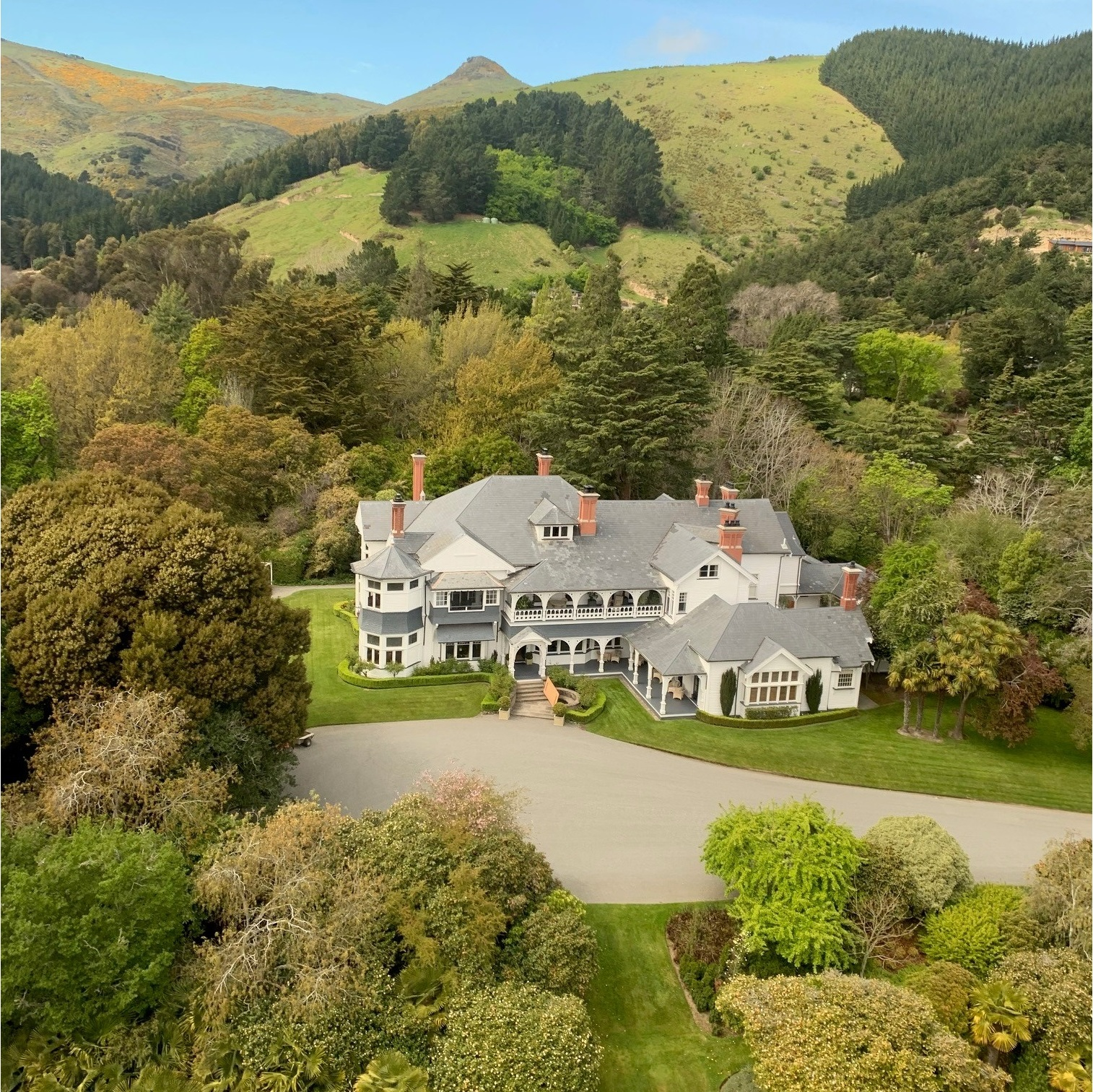
An aerial view of the Otahuna Lodge

He bred pedigree cattle at Otahuna, Tai Tapu, where he also grew daffodils.

== Philately ==
Rhodes was an advanced philatelist. He had a large collection of New Zealand Chalon head postage stamps. He was President of the Royal Philatelic Society of New Zealand and signed the Roll of Distinguished Philatelists in 1949.

== Honours and awards ==
For his role as the commissioner of the New Zealand Red Cross, Rhodes was appointed Knight Commander of the Order of the British Empire (KBE) in the 1920 New Year Honours. For his role of dealing with the Duke and Duchess of York he was appointed Knight Commander of the Royal Victorian Order (KCVO) in July 1927. He was awarded the King George V Silver Jubilee Medal in 1935. In 1953, Rhodes was awarded the Queen Elizabeth II Coronation Medal.

- Commander of the Order of the British Empire (Great Britain)
- Chevalier de la Légion d'Honneur (France)

== Footnotes ==
New Zealand Parliament
Preceded by William Montgomery	Member of Parliament for Ellesmere; 1899–1925	Succeeded by David Jones
Political offices
Preceded by George Russell	Minister of Public Health; 1912–1915	Succeeded by George Russell
Preceded by Harry Ell	Postmaster-General and Minister of Telegraphs; 1912–1915	Succeeded by Joseph Ward
