= William MacDonald (New Zealand politician) =

New Zealand politician (1862–1920)

The Honourable William MacDonald
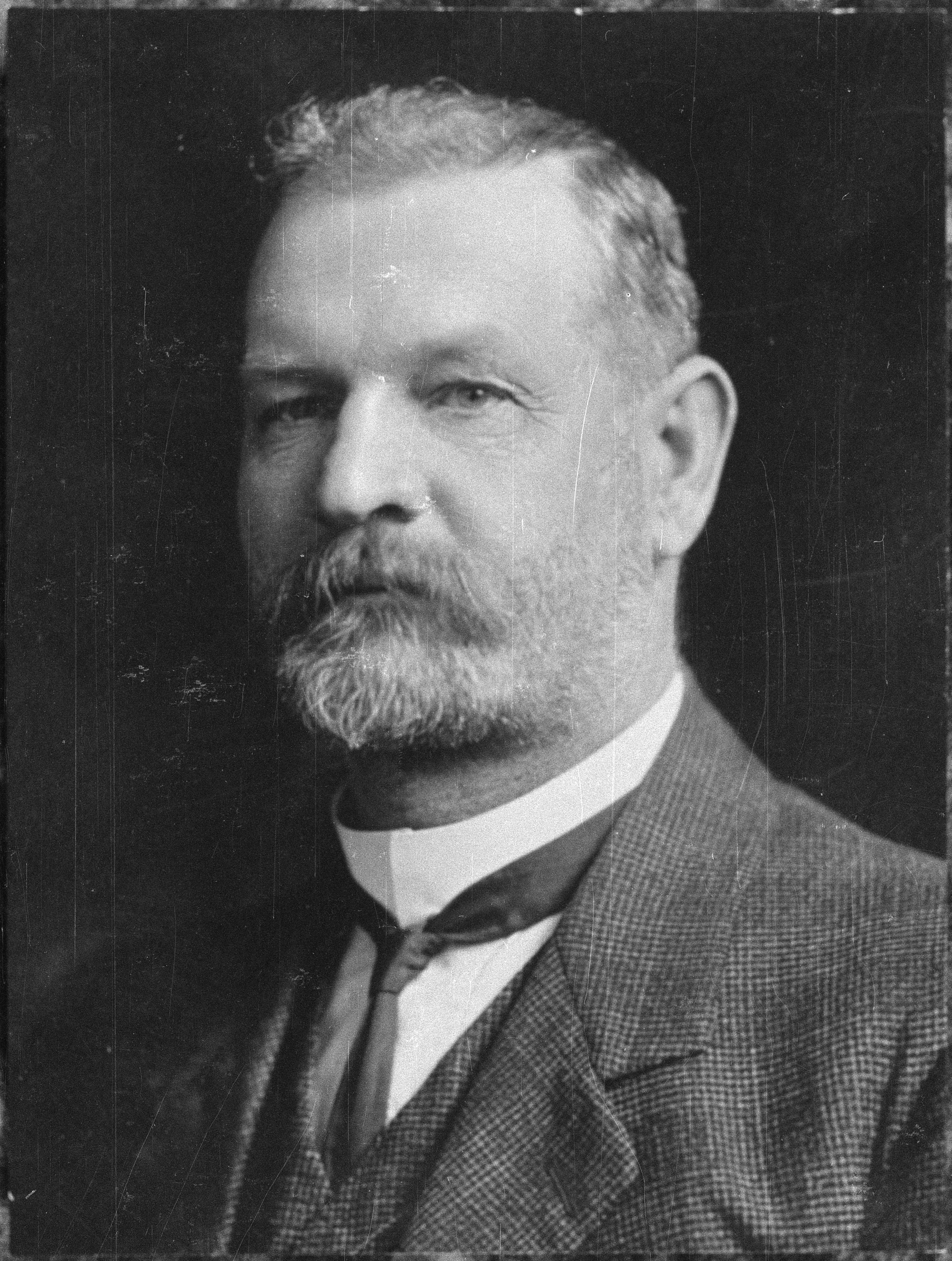
- William MacDonald in ca 1910

7th Leader of the Opposition
- In office 21 January 1920 – 31 August 1920
- Deputy: Thomas Wilford
- Preceded by: Joseph Ward
- Succeeded by: Thomas Wilford

8th Minister of Agriculture
- In office 12 August 1915 – 22 August 1919
- Prime Minister: William Massey
- Preceded by: William Massey
- Succeeded by: William Nosworthy

14th Minister of Public Works
- In office 28 March 1912 – 10 July 1912
- Prime Minister: Thomas Mackenzie
- Preceded by: Roderick McKenzie
- Succeeded by: William Fraser

Member of the New Zealand Parliament for Bay of Plenty
- In office 17 November 1908 – 31 August 1920
- Preceded by: William Herries
- Succeeded by: Kenneth Williams

Personal details
- Born: 1862 Meningwort, Colony of Victoria
- Died: 31 August 1920 (aged 57–58) Wellington, New Zealand
- Party: Liberal

William Donald Stuart MacDonald (1862 – 31 August 1920) was a New Zealand politician, Cabinet Minister, and briefly Leader of the Opposition.

== Biography ==
=== Early life ===
MacDonald was born in Meningwort. Victoria in 1862 and was a noted horseman in his youth. He emigrated to Poverty Bay in New Zealand in 1882 where he became a pastoralist. He worked in shepherding for several years and then became overseer of Ngatapa station. He then managed land at Papatu before doing likewise at two properties owned by Alexander Creighton Arthur at Matawhero and Whatatutu. In 1887 he became manager of the Bank of New Zealand estates at Gisborne, a position which he occupied until 1902. Also during this period he conducted a large amount of agricultural development work, clearing 70,000 acres of bush into farmland. He also managed several sheep stations during his career such as at Tokomaru Bay and Lorne station (the latter of which he owned).

His political career began in local politics. He served as a member of the Waiapu County Council, Tokomaru Harbour Board and Waiapu Hospital Board, and was later the first chairman of Waikohu County Council.

=== Member of Parliament ===
New Zealand Parliament
Years	Term	Electorate	Party
1908–1911	17th	Bay of Plenty	Liberal
1911–1914	18th	Bay of Plenty	Liberal
1914–1919	19th	Bay of Plenty	Liberal
1919–1920	20th	Bay of Plenty	Liberal

He was elected the Member of the House of Representatives for the Bay of Plenty at the 1908 general election. Once in Parliament he became known by the nickname "Fighting Mac." Unlike most of his Liberal Party colleagues MacDonald was a freeholder in regards to land ownership. He rose rapidly through the ranks and in 1910 he became senior party whip. He served as Minister of Public Works and Minister of Native Affairs in the short lived 1912 cabinet of Thomas Mackenzie. He also served in the wartime (1915–19) National cabinet as Minister of Agriculture, Minister of Mines and Minister in Charge of the Legislative, Public Buildings, Inspection of Machinery, State Fire and Accident Insurance Departments.

In 1919 MacDonald deputised several times for Sir Joseph Ward while he was overseas. On one such occasion in May he called a caucus meeting to discuss the coalition between the Liberal and Reform parties where a majority of members voted in favour of ending the arrangement upon Ward's return. MacDonald was himself unsure the correct decision was reached and he cabled Ward for his opinion, who agreed with the consensus in the caucus. Consequently, MacDonald worked with his colleagues (particularly George Russell and Thomas Wilford) to develop an updated policy manifesto for the next election. Following Ward's failure to gain re-election to parliament at the 1919 general election, MacDonald assumed the leadership. A month later he was formally elected to replace him as leader of the Liberal Party unopposed. He filled that role until his death in 1920.

=== Death ===
Macdonald's health had deteriorated after he broke his arm in an accident in mid-1919. Not long before his death he took leave from his Parliamentary duties for several weeks in order to go on a health recuperating visit to Auckland, leaving his deputy Thomas Wilford to act as Leader of the Opposition. Macdonald recovered following the treatment and resumed his seat in Parliament and was still speaking in the house the day before he died.

MacDonald died suddenly in his Kelburn home of a heart attack aged 56. He left a widow, two sons and three daughters.

== Notes ==
Political offices
Preceded by Joseph Ward	Leader of the Opposition; 1919–1920	Succeeded by Thomas Wilford
Preceded by William Massey	Minister of Agriculture; 1915-1919	Succeeded by William Nosworthy
Preceded by William Fraser	Minister of Mines; 1915-1919	Succeeded by William Fraser
Preceded by Roderick McKenzie	Minister of Public Works; 1912	Succeeded by William Fraser
Preceded by James Carroll	Minister of Native Affairs; 1912	Succeeded by William Herries
New Zealand Parliament
Preceded by William Herries	Member of Parliament for Bay of Plenty; 1908–1920	Succeeded by Kenneth Williams
Party political offices
Preceded by Joseph Ward	Leader of the Liberal Party; 1919–1920	Succeeded by Thomas Wilford
Preceded by George Laurenson	Senior Whip of the Liberal Party; 1910–1912	Succeeded by George Forbes
