= 1930 United Party (New Zealand) leadership election =

Election in New Zealand

1930 United Party leadership election
- 21 May 1930
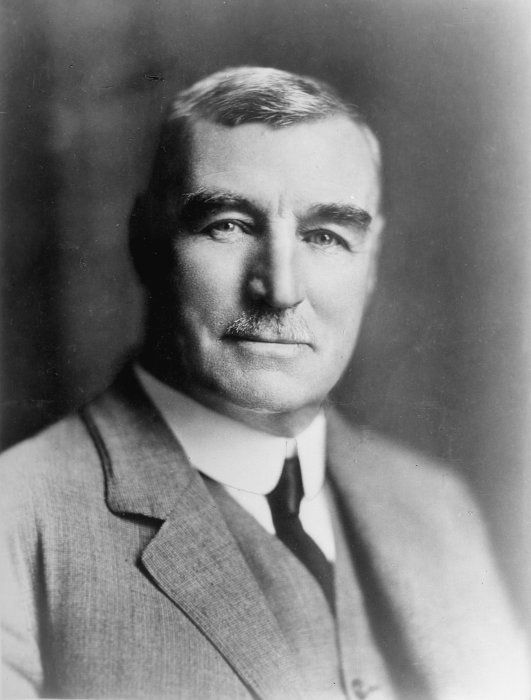

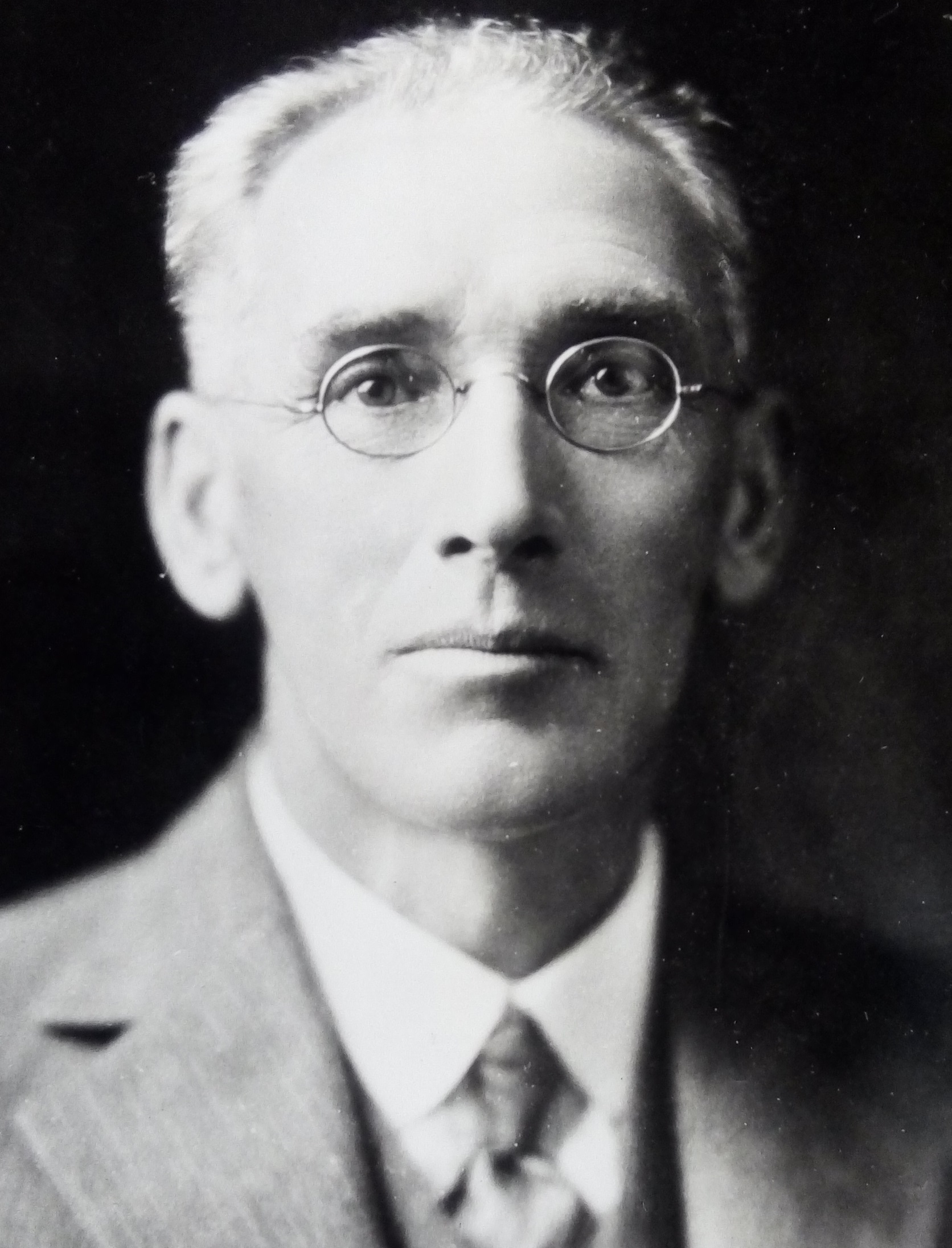

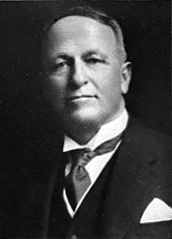

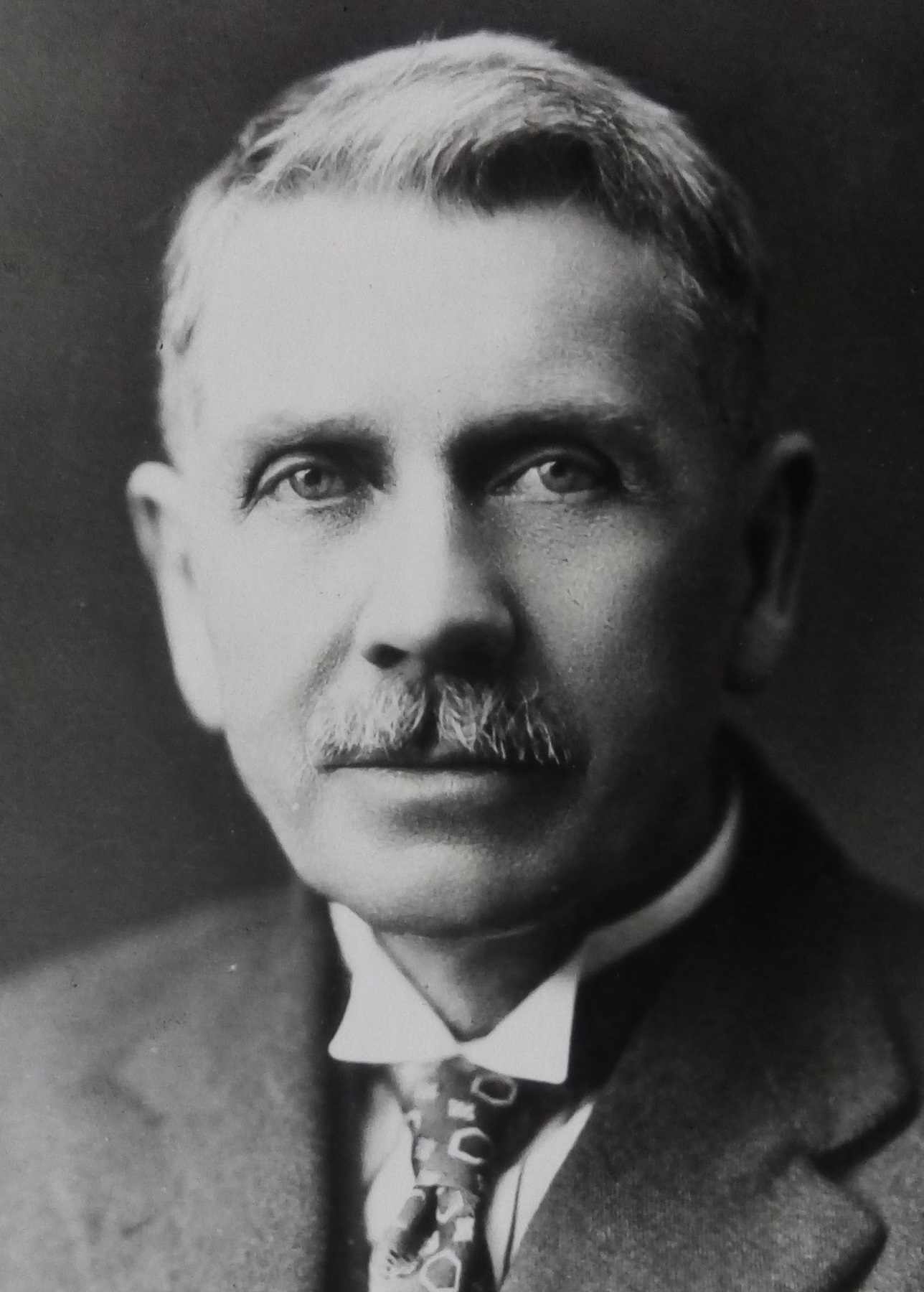
Candidate	George Forbes	Alfred Ransom
Second Ballot	≥15	<15
First Ballot	Advanced	Advanced
Candidate	Harry Atmore	Bill Veitch
First Ballot	Eliminated	Eliminated
Leader before election
Sir Joseph Ward
Leader after election
George Forbes

An election for the leadership of the United Party was held on 21 May 1930 to choose the next leader of the party. The election was won by Hurunui MP and co-deputy leader of the party George Forbes.

== Background ==
Sir Joseph Ward had been elected leader of the United Party at its inception in 1928. He then led the party at the 1928 election which resulted in United being able to form a government with support, albeit reluctant, from the Labour Party. By the end of its first year, Ward's government was not living up to expectation. During the election campaign Ward promised that £70 million would be loaned from overseas to fund government programmes, though little was, or could be, borrowed. This left the government without the funds to deal with the rapidly worsening economic recession and growing unemployment. Ward's health declined and his workload was reduced to little more than state administration and chairing cabinet meetings, leaving most of the political management to his two co-deputy leaders, George Forbes and Alfred Ransom. By September 1929 Ward's health worsened after he had a series of heart attacks. He was hospitalised, but improved enough to then travel to Rotorua for treatment and use of its medicinal spa baths. No cabinet meeting were held in the opening months of 1930 but Ward continued to fulfil the administrate affairs of state However, many of his colleagues and family assembled at his bedside on 14 May 1930 where he agreed to resign as leader and Prime Minister.

== Candidates ==
Harry Atmore
The MP for Nelson, Harry Atmore was an independent MP who was involved in the discussions that established the United Party, though he did not join it. A decades long friend and supporter of Ward he was still aligned with United (who did not run a candidate against him in 1928) and supported it in the house and was one of four independent MPs who caucused with the United MPs. Ward invited him to join his cabinet in December 1928 and appointed him as Minister of Education and Minister for Science and Industrial Research, ranked fifth in the cabinet.

George Forbes
Forbes had been the MP for Hurunui since 1908 and was Senior Whip of the Liberal Party from 1912 to 1923. In 1925 Forbes had been elected leader of the Liberal Party after Thomas Wilford's resignation. He then led the party to a disastrous result at the 1925 general election, losing eleven seats while Reform totaled fifty-five. He even lost his status as Leader of the Opposition afterwards. He had remained the leader of the party in parliament whilst working with Davy on launching the United Party. He lost the leadership to Ward in 1928 but was appointed co-deputy leader for the South Island. He was ranked second in Ward's cabinet and served as Minister of Agriculture and Minister of Lands.

Alfred Ransom
Alfred Ransom was a former Mayor of Dannevirke who had been MP for Pahiatua since 1922. In 1926 he had become the party's senior whip. He narrowly lost the leadership to Ward in 1928 but was appointed co-deputy leader for the North Island. He was ranked seventh in Ward's cabinet and served as Minister of Public Works.

Bill Veitch
Veitch had been the MP for Wanganui since 1911. Previously aligned with Labour he had become an independent before joining the Liberal Party at the 1922 election. As Liberal leader Forbes was not well known outside the South Island the Liberal campaign in the North Island had been run by Veitch. In March 1927 he had begun a campaign to revive the Liberal Party. He led a group of Liberals who wanted to rejuvenate the party and had recently toured the country giving speeches to attract more members and candidates for the party. He lost the leadership to Ward in 1928 but was appointed president of the party. He was ranked sixth in Ward's cabinet and served as Minister of Labour, Minister of Mines and Minister of Transport.

== Result ==
For the leadership four nominees were voted for in an exhaustive ballot by the United Party caucus which consisted of 25 United MPs, one United MLC (Sir Thomas Sidey) and four independent MPs who caucused with United (Atmore, James Thomas Hogan, William Polson and Charles Wilkinson). Ward was still recuperating in Rotorua and was the only absence. The caucus was held in Wellington in the evening (just after 9pm) on 21 May 1930. In the first ballot Atmore and Veitch polled equal lowest and it was agreed both candidates were eliminated. In the next ballot Forbes beat Ransom to win the leadership. The precise numbers were not revealed but it was reported in the media that the final ballot result was very close.

== Aftermath ==
Ward was telephoned to inform him of the result but he was asleep. He then travelled from Rotorua to Wellington to tender his resignation as Prime Minister to the Governor-General on 28 May. Forbes became Prime Minister but struggled to govern the country in the mounting crisis of the Great Depression. Forbes appointed Ward to his cabinet as a Minister without portfolio, ranked second in the ministry. In 1931 he lost support from the Labour Party who opposed his policy of retrenchment. To continue to govern United had to seek support from the Reform Party. United and Reform contested the 1931 election as a coalition and were re-elected, though Reform were the larger of the two. Forbes still remained Prime Minister despite United being the smaller coalition partner. The United–Reform Coalition was defeated at the 1935 election. Forbes continued as leader of the United Party until 1936 when it was absorbed into the new National Party.
