= 1928 United Party (New Zealand) leadership election =

Election in New Zealand

1928 United Party leadership election
- 17 September 1928
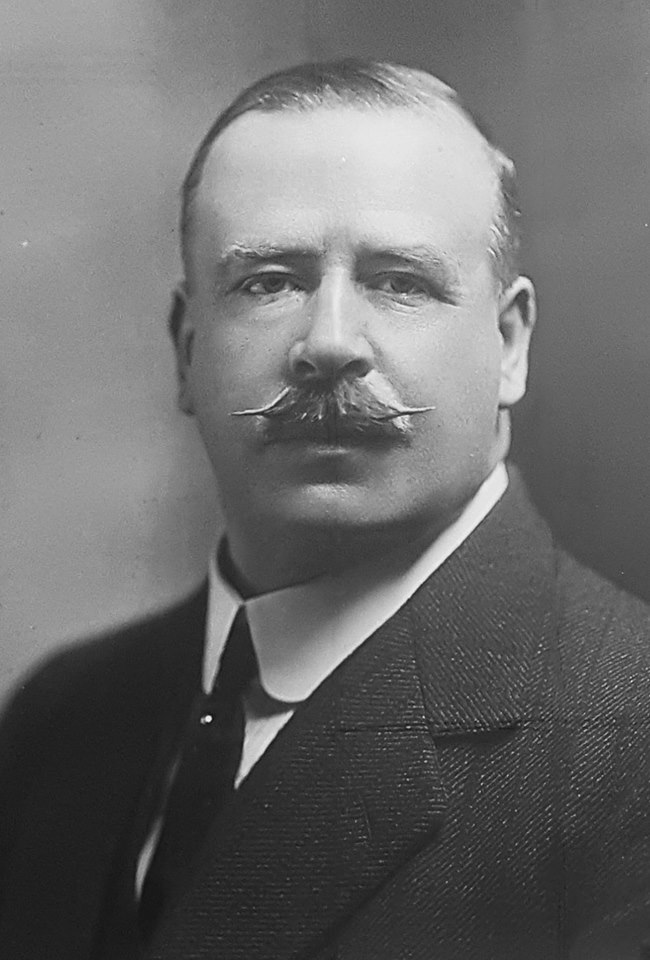

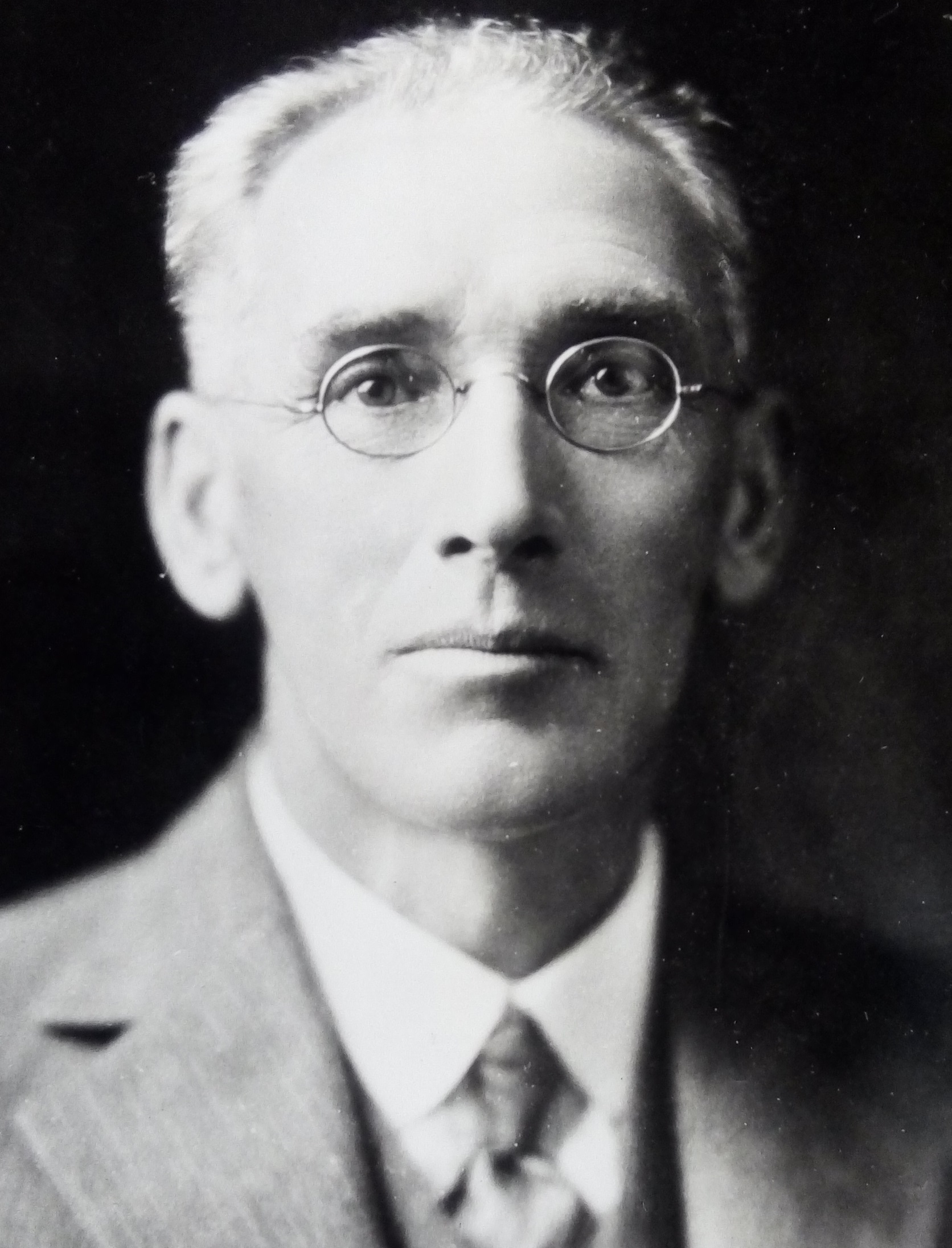

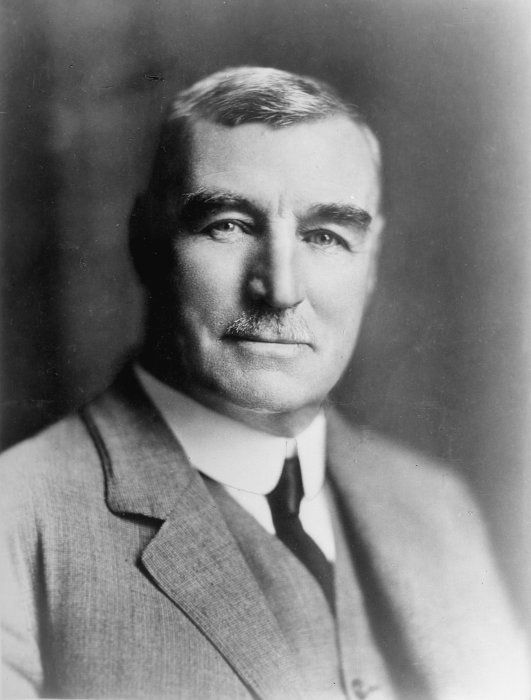

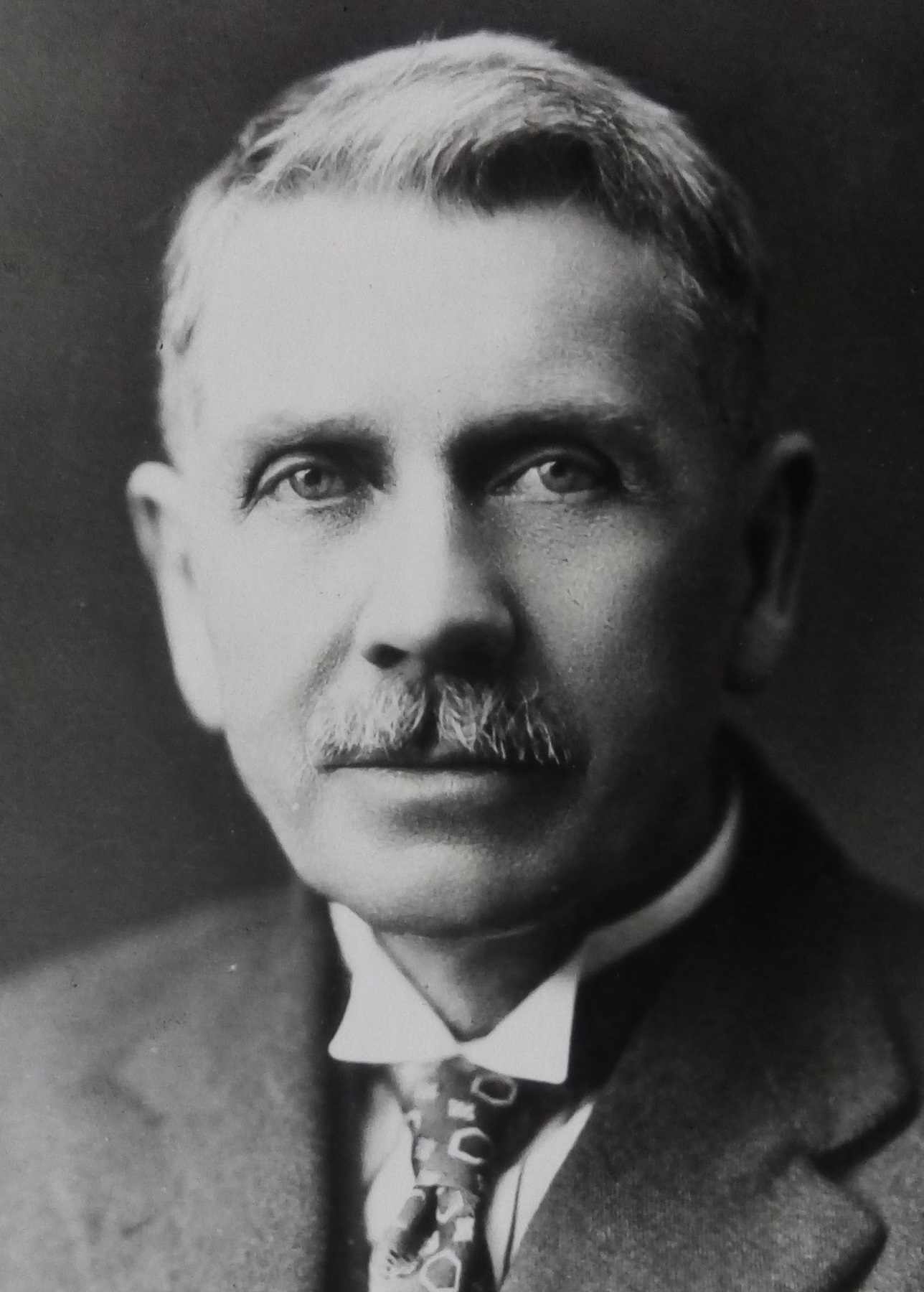
Candidate	Sir Joseph Ward	Alfred Ransom
Final Ballot	≥26	<26
Second Ballot	Advanced	Advanced
First Ballot	Advanced	Advanced
Candidate	George Forbes	Bill Veitch
Second Ballot	Eliminated	Eliminated
First Ballot	Advanced	Eliminated
Leader before election
George Forbes
Leader after election
Sir Joseph Ward

An election for the leadership of the United Party, which had replaced the New Zealand Liberal Party, was held at a conference on 17 September 1928 to choose the inaugural leader of the party. The election was won by Invercargill MP and former Liberal Prime Minister Sir Joseph Ward.

== Background ==
The Liberal Party was in decline after a humbling defeat at the 1925 election. Two factions were emerging coalescing around the Liberal leader George Forbes (known as the "Nationals") and Liberal MP Bill Veitch who was advocating for a rejuvenation of the party. The party was caught between the right-leaning Reform Party government and the left-leaning Labour Party (which had superseded the Liberals as the official opposition) and was struggling for relevance. At the same time there was internal dissension among the Reform Party organisation over direction and policy. Reform's campaign manager, Albert Davy, had begun working with Auckland businessman John William Shaw McArthur to finance the creation of a new party. In August 1927 Davy founded the United New Zealand Political Organisation (UNZPO). He was joined in November by the National faction of the Liberal Party under Forbes and in April 1928 by Veitch and revived Liberal Party faction. By September, financed and supported by various groups disaffected from Reform, the UNZPO held its first conference in Wellington. The first two days of the conference, chaired by former Liberal MP Robert Masters, delegates debated and decided on party policy and the name of the party with the UNZPO being shortened to simply the United Party.

With these matters settled, the leadership was then the last matter to be determined. Without consulting other party members, Davy had earlier invited former Liberal Prime Minister Sir Joseph Ward (who was abroad visiting Canada) to stand for the leadership. While Ward was visiting Winnipeg, he was contacted by a journalist hired by Davy to track him down who asked him about his availability to lead the new party. At the same time Davy (without Ward's knowledge) had told the press in New Zealand that Ward was potentially available for the leadership (having become certain he was the only credible leader to win an election for the party). On 9 September Ward returned to New Zealand and went straight to Wellington to attend parliament (deflecting questions from reporters over whether he would stand for the leadership) and then attend the United conference.

== Candidates ==
George Forbes
Forbes had been the MP for Hurunui since 1908 and was Senior Whip of the Liberal Party from 1912 to 1923. In 1925 Forbes had been elected leader of the Liberal Party after Thomas Wilford's resignation. He then led the party to a disastrous result at the 1925 general election, losing eleven seats while Reform totaled fifty-five. He even lost his status as Leader of the Opposition afterwards. He had remained the leader of the party in parliament whilst working with Davy on relaunching it.

Alfred Ransom
Alfred Ransom was a former Mayor of Dannevirke who had been MP for Pahiatua since 1922. In 1926 he had become the party's senior whip.

Bill Veitch
Veitch had been the MP for Wanganui since 1911. Previously aligned with Labour he had become an independent before joining the Liberal Party at the 1922 election. As Liberal leader Forbes was not well known outside the South Island the Liberal campaign in the North Island had been run by Veitch. In March 1927 he had begun a campaign to revive the Liberal Party. He led a group of Liberals who wanted to rejuvenate the party and had recently toured the country giving speeches to attract more members and candidates for the party.

Sir Joseph Ward
Ward was a seasoned political figure in New Zealand, though was aging and frail at 72 years old. First elected to parliament in 1887 he had been a minister for 26 years and prime minister from 1906 to 1912 he had the experience and name recognition Davy wanted in a leader of a new party. Thinking that neither Forbes nor Veitch would be suitable Davy engineered for Ward to be a compromise candidate. Policy wise he was a somewhat awkward fit for the new party as Ward was still an adherent to traditional Liberalism whilst the many of adherents to the new party were right-wing free-marketeers formerly linked with Reform.

== Result ==
For the leadership four nominees were voted for in an exhaustive ballot by 51 United MPs and candidates. Veitch was eliminated in the first ballot and Forbes in the second. The next ballot was inconclusive. One account is that it resulted in a tie, while another that Ransom narrowly won by one vote, but two more votes were cast than there were eligible delegates. In either case it was voided and another ballot was then held where several delegates, after being pressured by Davy, switched allegiance which resulted in Ward winning a majority. Two co-deputy leaders were appointed, Forbes for the South Island and Ransom for the North Island. Veitch was then made president of the party.

== Aftermath ==
Ward was ecstatic to have won the leadership after nine years in the political wilderness since he stood down as Liberal leader in 1919. He was not happy with the name United for the party, still preferring the Liberal name, but as the name had been decided before he became its leader he was unable to change it. He led the United Party at the 1928 election which resulted in United being able to form a government with support, albeit reluctant, from the Labour Party. Ward remained United leader and Prime Minister until May 1930 when he resigned due to ill health.
