= Mayor of Dannevirke =

The mayor of Dannevirke officiated over the Dannevirke Borough and then the Dannevirke District of New Zealand. The borough was administered by the Dannevirke Borough Council. The initial office existed from 1892 until 1987, when Dannevirke Borough and County became Dannevirke District Council. This body was later amalgamated into the Tararua District as part of the 1989 local government reforms. There have been 17 mayors of Dannevirke.

== List of mayors ==
	Name	Term
1	Angus McKay	1892–1895
2	William Henderson	1892–1893
(1)	Angus McKay	1893–1895
3	Neil McPhee	1895–1896
(1)	Angus McKay	1896–1897
4	John Drummond	1897–1902
5	Alexander Lawrence Gordon	1902–1903
6	Hans Madsen Ries	1903–1905
7	John James Patterson	1905–1906
(6)	Hans Madsen Ries	1905–1910
8	Alfred Ransom	1910–1919
9	G.I. Anderson	1919–1923
10	A.J.C. Runciman	1923–1929
11	M.D. Smith	1929–1935
12	Edward Gibbard	1935–1953
13	W. Holloway	1953–1956
14	Marcus John Quentin Poole	1956–1959
(12)	Edward Gibbard	1959–1962
15	Lloyd Appelton	1962–1974
16	H.C. Lidington	1974–1983
17	Ernest Gartrell	1983–1989

== See also ==
- List of former territorial authorities in New Zealand
