= Alfred Ransom =

New Zealand politician

The Honourable Sir Alfred Ransom KCMG
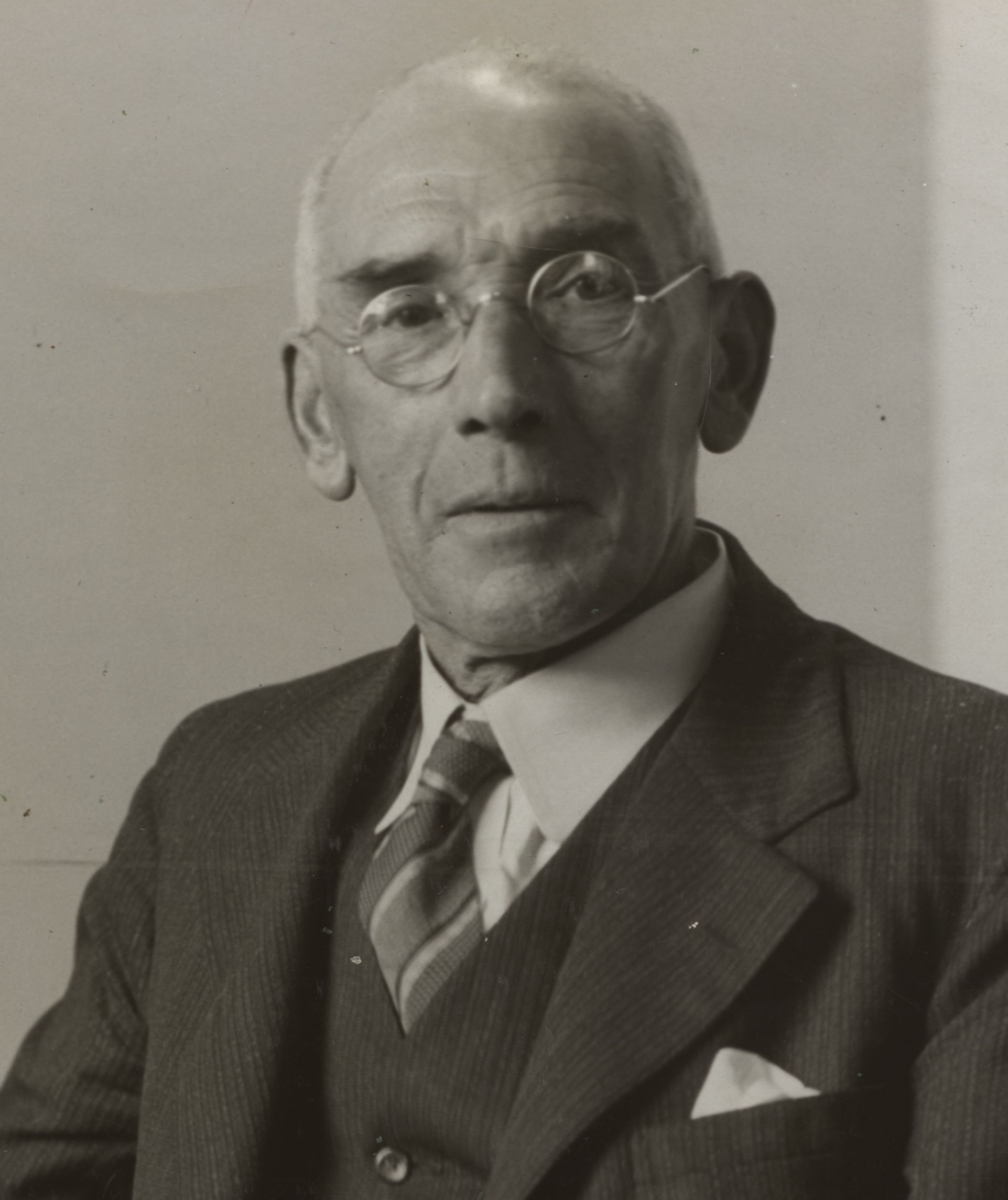
- Sir Alfred Ransom in ca 1938

29th Minister of Lands
- In office 28 May 1930 – 6 December 1935
- Prime Minister: George Forbes
- Preceded by: George Forbes
- Succeeded by: Frank Langstone

18th Minister of Public Works
- In office 0 December 1928 – 28 May 1930
- Prime Minister: Sir Joseph Ward
- Preceded by: Kenneth Williams
- Succeeded by: William Taverner

Member of the New Zealand Parliament for Pahiatua
- In office 7 December 1922 – 22 May 1943
- Preceded by: Archibald McNicol
- Succeeded by: Keith Holyoake

Personal details
- Born: 19 March 1868 Lower Hutt, New Zealand
- Died: 22 May 1943 (aged 75) Dannevirke, New Zealand
- Spouse: Antonette Katinka Sondergaard (m. 1893)
- Profession: farmer, saddler

Sir Ethelbert Alfred Ransom KCMG (19 March 1868 – 22 May 1943) was a New Zealand politician of the Liberal Party, then its successor the United Party, and from 1936, the National Party. He was a cabinet minister from 1928 to 1935 in the United Government, and was acting prime minister in 1930 and in 1935.

== Early life ==
Ransom was born in 1868 in Lower Hutt. He received his education at Lower Hutt Primary, where he was school mate with Thomas Wilford. He played rugby and tennis during his youth. During the Second Boer War, he was an officer in charge of the Ruahine Mounted Rifles. He was a sheep farmer until 1888, and then a saddler in Dannevirke. From 1920 onwards, he was sheep farming in the Ākitio district.

He held numerous public offices: he was chairman of the Hawke's Bay War Relief Association, chairman of the Dannevirke branch of the same organisation, chairman of the power board (until 1928), the first president of the local chamber of commerce, chairman of the fire board, member of the Dannevirke High School board, member of the executive of the Farmers' Union, and represented on the Dannevirke A&P Association.

On 1 March 1893, Ransom married Antonette Katinka Sondergaard from Palmerston North at her home town. They lost an infant daughter and a son in 1902 and 1905, respectively.

== Political career ==
New Zealand Parliament
Years	Term	Electorate	Party
1922–1925	21st	Pahiatua	Liberal
1925–1928	22nd	Pahiatua	Liberal
1928	Changed allegiance to:		United
1928–1931	23rd	Pahiatua	United
1931–1935	24th	Pahiatua	United
1935–1936	25th	Pahiatua	United
1936–1938	Changed allegiance to:		National
1938–1943	26th	Pahiatua	National

Ransom was elected onto the Dannevirke Borough Council in 1901. He stood for Mayor of Dannevirke in 1903, but was beaten by the Lutheran pastor Hans Madsen Ries in a closely fought contest. Ransom was Mayor of Dannevirke from 1910, when he succeeded Ries, to 1919.

He represented the rural Wairarapa electorate of Pahiatua for the Liberal Party from 1922, when he defeated Reform's Archibald McNicol. From 1926 to 1928 he was senior opposition whip. During the 1920s he was an advocate for fusion between the Liberal and Reform parties, to avoid vote splitting and best combat the Labour Party.

When the Liberal Party was relaunched as the United Party Ransom contested the leadership of the new party. However, he was narrowly beaten for the position by Sir Joseph Ward, a former Liberal prime minister, who had been brought in by party organiser Albert Davy as a compromise candidate. He was then appointed deputy leader of the United Party for the North Island. During the time of the United Government, he was Minister of Public Works (1928–1930) under Ward.

When a terminally ill Ward resigned as prime minister in 1930, Ransom contested the leadership of the party again but lost the caucus ballot to George Forbes. Under Forbes he was Minister of Lands and Commissioner of State Forests (1930–1931). He retained his portfolios until 1935 in the United–Reform Coalition. He was twice acting prime minister; for five months between 25 August 1930 and 21 January 1931, when Forbes attended the Imperial Conference in London, and again in 1935, when Forbes was overseas once more.

In 1940, he announced that he would not stand again at the next general election due to poor health, but he died in 1943 before the end of the parliamentary term.

== Later life ==
In 1935, Ransom was awarded the King George V Silver Jubilee Medal, and he was appointed a Knight Commander of the Order of St Michael and St George in the 1935 King's Birthday Honours. He died on 22 May 1943 in Dannevirke, where he is also buried. At the funeral, senior whip Walter Broadfoot represented the National Party, and Prime Minister Peter Fraser represented the First Labour Government. Ransom was survived by his wife, a son and a daughter. His wife died in 1952.

== Notes ==
Political offices
Preceded by Kenneth Williams	Minister of Public Works; 1928–1930	Succeeded by William Taverner
Preceded by William Taverner	Commissioner of State Forests; 1930–1935	Succeeded by Frank Langstone
Preceded by George Forbes	Minister of Lands; 1930–1935	Succeeded by Frank Langstone
New Zealand Parliament
Preceded by Archibald McNicol	Member of Parliament for Pahiatua; 1922–1943	Succeeded by Keith Holyoake
Party political offices
Preceded by Sydney George Smith	Senior Whip of the Liberal Party; 1926–1928	Succeeded by Alfred Murdoch
