= Minister of Transport (New Zealand) =

New Zealand minister of the Crown

Minister of Transport of New Zealand
- Coat of Arms of New Zealand

- Flag of New Zealand

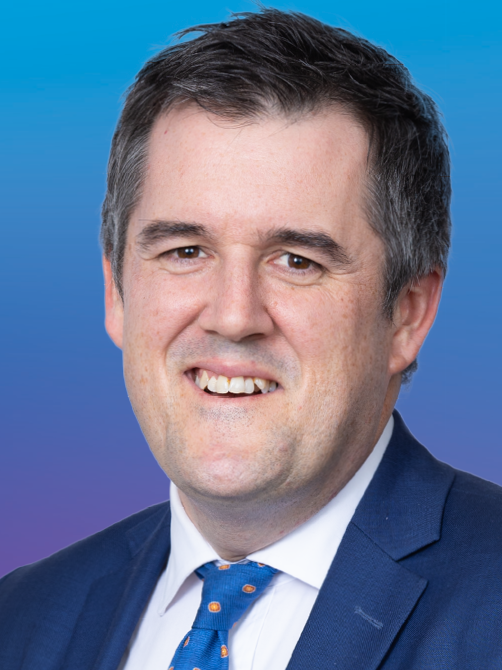
- Incumbent; Chris Bishop since 24 January 2025
- Ministry of Transport
- Style: The Honourable
- Member of: Cabinet of New Zealand; Executive Council
- Reports to: Prime Minister of New Zealand
- Appointer: Governor-General of New Zealand
- Term length: At His Majesty's pleasure
- Formation: 10 December 1928
- First holder: Bill Veitch

The Minister of Transport is a minister in the New Zealand Government responsible for investment in transport infrastructure and services, regulation, and developing the transport system to maximise economic and social benefits while minimising harm.

== Ministers of Transport ==
The following ministers have held the office of Minister of Transport.

Key

United Reform Labour National

No.	Name	Portrait	Term of Office		Prime Minister
1	Bill Veitch		10 December 1928	28 May 1930	Ward
2	William Taverner		28 May 1930	22 September 1931	Forbes
3	Gordon Coates		22 September 1931	6 December 1935	Forbes
4	Bob Semple		6 December 1935	9 December 1942	Savage
4	Bob Semple		6 December 1935	9 December 1942	Fraser
5	James O'Brien		9 December 1942	28 September 1947†	Fraser
6	Fred Hackett		18 October 1947	13 December 1949	Fraser
7	Stan Goosman		13 December 1949	12 December 1957	Holland
7	Stan Goosman		13 December 1949	12 December 1957	Holyoake
8	John Mathison		12 December 1957	12 December 1960	Nash
9	John McAlpine		12 December 1960	12 December 1966	Holyoake
10	Peter Gordon		12 December 1966	8 December 1972	Holyoake
10	Peter Gordon		12 December 1966	8 December 1972	Marshall
11	Sir Basil Arthur		8 December 1972	12 December 1975	Kirk
11	Sir Basil Arthur		8 December 1972	12 December 1975	Rowling
12	Colin McLachlan		12 December 1975	11 December 1981	Muldoon
13	George Gair		11 December 1981	26 July 1984	Muldoon
14	Richard Prebble		26 July 1984	24 August 1987	Lange
15	Bill Jeffries		24 August 1987	2 November 1990	Lange
15	Bill Jeffries		24 August 1987	2 November 1990	Palmer
15	Bill Jeffries		24 August 1987	2 November 1990	Moore
16	Rob Storey		2 November 1990	29 November 1993	Bolger
17	Maurice Williamson		29 November 1993	16 December 1996	Bolger
18	Jenny Shipley		16 December 1996	8 December 1997	Bolger
(17)	Maurice Williamson		8 December 1997	10 December 1999	Shipley
19	Mark Gosche		10 December 1999	27 July 2002	Clark
20	Paul Swain		27 July 2002	26 February 2004	Clark
21	Pete Hodgson		26 February 2004	19 October 2005	Clark
22	David Parker		19 October 2005	21 March 2006	Clark
23	Annette King		21 March 2006	19 November 2008	Clark
24	Steven Joyce		19 November 2008	12 December 2011	Key
25	Gerry Brownlee		12 December 2011	6 October 2014	Key
26	Simon Bridges		6 October 2014	26 October 2017	Key
26	Simon Bridges		6 October 2014	26 October 2017	English
27	Phil Twyford		26 October 2017	6 November 2020	Ardern
28	Michael Wood		6 November 2020	21 June 2023	Ardern
28	Michael Wood		6 November 2020	21 June 2023	Hipkins
(22)	David Parker		21 June 2023	27 November 2023	Hipkins
29	Simeon Brown		27 November 2023	24 January 2025	Luxon
30	Chris Bishop		24 January 2025	present	Luxon
