= 1931 New Zealand general election =

- 1 (Māori) & 2 December (general) 1931

All 80 seats in the New Zealand House of Representatives 41 seats were needed for a majority
- Turnout: 714,511 (83.3%)▼
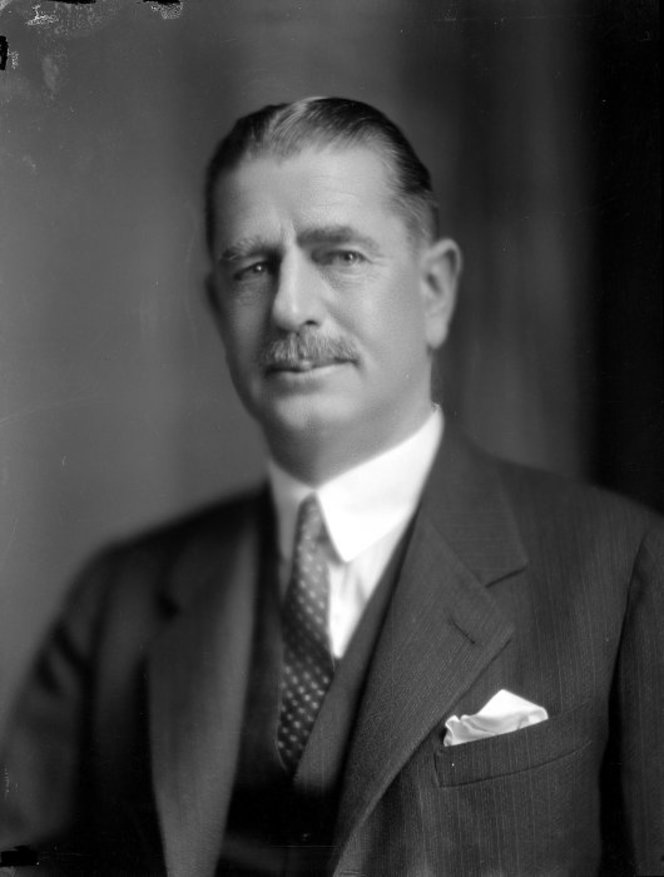

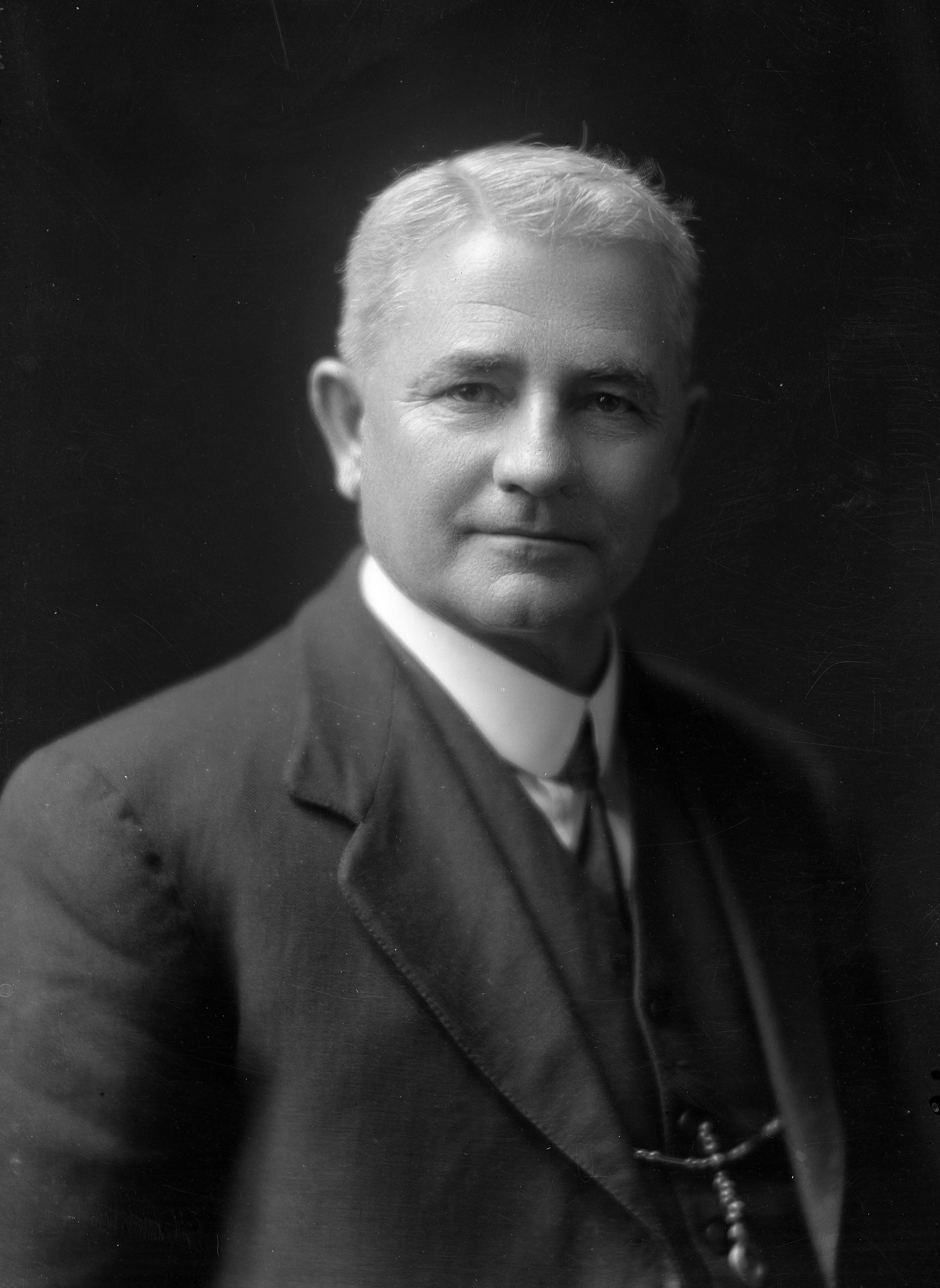

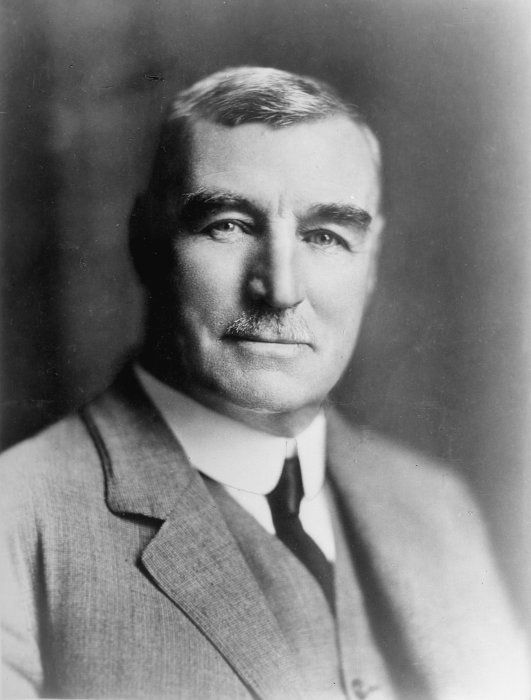

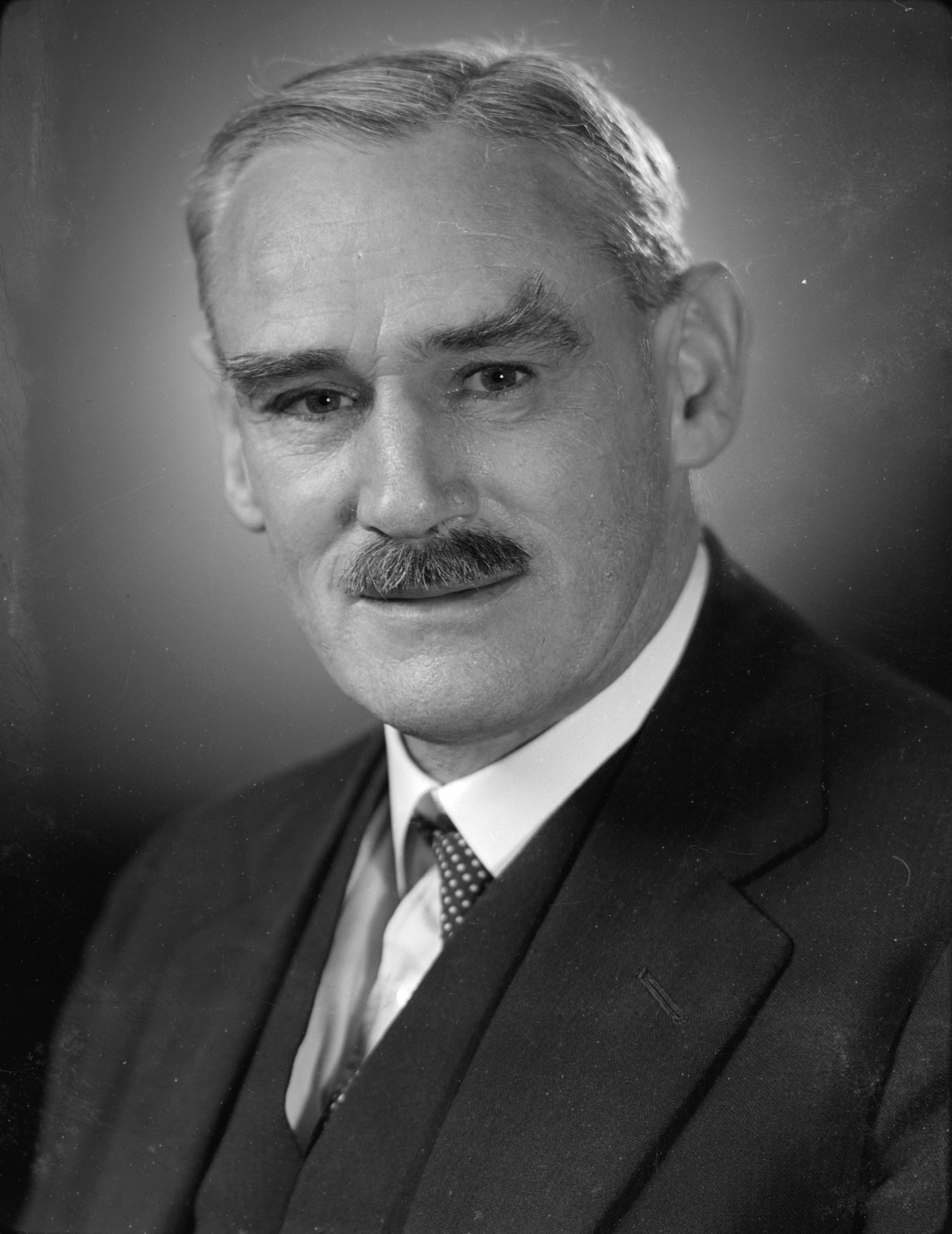
| | First party | Second party |
|---|---|---|
| Leader | Gordon Coates | Harry Holland |
| Party | Reform | Labour |
| Alliance | United–Reform Coalition |
| Leader since | 27 May 1925 | 27 August 1919 |
| Leader's seat | Kaipara | Buller |
| Last election | 27 seats, 34.8% | 19 seats, 26.2% |
| Seats won | 28 | 24 |
| Seat change | 0 | ▲5 |
| Popular vote | 190,170 | 244,881 |
| Percentage | 26.6% | 34.3% |
| Swing | ▼9.3% | ▲8.1% |
| | Third party | Fourth party |
| Leader | George Forbes | Harold Rushworth |
| Party | United | Country Party |
| Alliance | United–Reform Coalition |
| Leader since | 21 May 1930 | November 1928 |
| Leader's seat | Hurunui | Bay of Islands |
| Last election | 27 seats, 29.8% | 1 seat, 1.6% |
| Seats won | 19 | 1 |
| Seat change | ▼8 | 0 |
| Popular vote | 120,801 | 16,710 |
| Percentage | 16.9% | 2.3% |
| Swing | ▼13.3% | ▲0.7% |
- Results of the election.
Prime Minister before election
George Forbes
United
Subsequent Prime Minister
George Forbes
United

The 1931 New Zealand general election was a nationwide vote to determine the shape of the New Zealand Parliament's 24th term. It resulted in the newly formed coalition between the United Party and the Reform Party remaining in office as the United–Reform Coalition Government, although the opposition Labour Party made some minor gains despite tallying more votes than any other single party.

== Background ==
In the 1928 election, the Reform Party won 28 seats to the United Party's 27 seats. Shortly after the election the Reform Party lost a vote of no-confidence and the United Party managed to form a government, the United Government, with the support of the Labour Party, with governing Reform Party going into the opposition. In 1931, however, the agreement between United and Labour collapsed due to differing opinions on how to counter the Great Depression. The Reform Party, fearing that the Depression would give Labour a substantial boost, reluctantly agreed to form a coalition with United to avert elections. By forming a coalition, United and Reform were able to blunt Labour's advantage, ending the possibility of the anti-Labour vote being split.

== The election ==
The date for the main 1931 elections was 2 December, a Wednesday. Elections to the four Māori electorates were held the day before. 874,787 people were registered to vote, and there was a turnout of 83.3%. This turnout was below average for the time period.

The number of seats was 80, a number which had been fixed since 1902. However, in four electorates (Bay of Plenty, Oroua, Pahiatua, Waitomo) there was only one candidate.

== Results ==
Crowd on intersection of Willis and Mercer Streets in Wellington, outside the offices of The Evening Post, awaiting the results of the 1931 general election.

The 1931 election saw the recently formed governing coalition retain office as the United–Reform Coalition, winning fifty-one seats, including four independents. This was a drop of four seats from what the two parties had won in the previous elections, but was still considerably better than many had expected given the economic situation. The Labour Party won twenty-four seats, a gain of five. In the popular vote (including pro-coalition independents), the coalition won 54.0% of the vote, down from the 66.1% that the two parties had won previously. Labour won 34.3%. The only other party to gain a place in Parliament was the Country Party, which won a single seat. Four other independents were elected. Four candidates were elected unopposed: Walter Broadfoot in Waitomo, John Cobbe in Oroua, Alfred Ransom in Pahiatua, and Kenneth Williams in Bay of Plenty.

=== Party totals ===
Winning party by electorate.

Election results
| Party | Leader | Votes | Percentage | | Seats | change |
|---|---|---|---|---|---|---|
| Reform | Gordon Coates | 190,170 | 26.60 | 54.03 | 28 | ±0 |
| United | George Forbes | 120,801 | 16.90 | 54.03 | 19 | -8 |
| Independents (in support of Coalition) | | 75,069 | 10.53 | 54.03 | 4 | +3 |
| Labour | Harry Holland | 244,867 | 34.27 | | 24 | +5 |
| Country Party | Harold Rushworth | 16,710 | 2.34 | | 1 | ±0 |
| Ratana | | 7,154 | 1.00 | | 0 | ±0 |
| Independents | | 66,894 | 8.36 | | 4 | -1 |
| Total | | 714,511 | 100% | | 80 | |

=== Votes summary ===
Popular Vote
| All Coalition Parties | 54.03% |
| Labour | 34.27% |
| Coalition Reform | 26.60% |
| Coalition United | 16.90% |
| Country Party | 2.34% |
| Coalition Independent | 10.53% |
| Independent | 9.36% |

Parliament seats
| All Coalition Parties | 63.75% |
| Coalition Reform | 35.00% |
| Labour | 30.00% |
| Coalition United | 23.75% |
| Country Party | 1.25% |
| Coalition Independent | 5.00% |
| Independent | 5.00% |

The following table shows the detailed results:

Key

Reform Labour United Country Party Independent Liberal Ratana Independent

Electorate results for the 1931 New Zealand general election
| Electorate | Incumbent | Winner | Majority | Runner up |
|---|---|---|---|---|
General electorates
| Auckland Central | Bill Parry | | 3,793 | Harold Penfound Congdon |
| Auckland East | James Donald | Bill Schramm | 2,256 | Harold Percy Burton |
| Auckland Suburbs | Rex Mason | | 1,223 | Richard Herbert Marryatt |
| Auckland West | Michael Joseph Savage | | 4,517 | Hugh Ross Mackenzie |
| Avon | Dan Sullivan | | 3,039 | Harben Robert Young |
| Awarua | Philip De La Perrelle | | 2,148 | Norman McIntyre |
| Bay of Islands | Harold Rushworth | | 1,209 | Allen Bell |
| Bay of Plenty | Kenneth Williams | | Uncontested | |
| Buller | Harry Holland | | 3,631 | John Menzies |
| Central Otago | William Bodkin | | 2,516 | Charles Todd |
| Chalmers | Alfred Ansell | | 172 | Norman Hartley Campbell |
| Christchurch East | Tim Armstrong | | 3,206 | George Frederick Allen |
| Christchurch North | Henry Holland | | 2,077 | Elizabeth McCombs |
| Christchurch South | Ted Howard | | 2,798 | Charlie McCully |
| Clutha | Fred Waite | Peter McSkimming | 1,530 | Fred Waite |
| Dunedin Central | Charles Statham | | 262 | Peter Neilson |
| Dunedin North | Jim Munro | | 524 | John McCrae |
| Dunedin South | William Taverner | Fred Jones | 3,644 | William Taverner |
| Dunedin West | William Downie Stewart Jr | | 924 | John Gilchrist |
| Eden | Arthur Stallworthy | | 1,270 | Bill Anderton |
| Egmont | Charles Wilkinson | | 1,308 | Frederick Gawith |
| Franklin | Jack Massey | | 2,457 | Harry Mellsop |
| Gisborne | Douglas Lysnar | David Coleman | 317 | Douglas Lysnar |
| Grey Lynn | John Fletcher | John A. Lee | 3,242 | John Fletcher |
| Hamilton | Alexander Young | | 3,072 | Hubert Beebe |
| Hauraki | Walter William Massey | | 2,750 | Charles Robert Petrie |
| Hawke's Bay | Hugh Campbell | | 2,259 | Ted Cullen |
| Hurunui | George Forbes | | 3,953 | Robert Joseph Logan |
| Hutt | Walter Nash | | 2,823 | James Kerr (Note: For some biographical details of James Kerr refer to his father's article) |
| Invercargill | Vincent Ward | James Hargest | 508 | William McChesney |
| Kaiapoi | Richard Hawke | | 1,414 | John Archer |
| Kaipara | Gordon Coates | | 2,084 | Albert Edward Robinson |
| Lyttelton | James McCombs | | 32 | Frederick Freeman |
| Manawatu | Joseph Linklater | | 2,246 | Lorrie Hunter |
| Manukau | Bill Jordan | | 3,394 | Stanley Rickards |
| Marsden | Alfred Murdoch | | 2,942 | Jim Barclay |
| Masterton | George Sykes | | 1,951 | Peter Butler |
| Mataura | David McDougall | | 943 | Thomas Golden |
| Mid-Canterbury | David Jones | Jeremiah Connolly | 136 | David Jones |
| Motueka | George Black | | 517 | Keith Holyoake |
| Napier | Bill Barnard | | 1,456 | John Butler |
| Nelson | Harry Atmore | | 100 | Herbert Everett |
| New Plymouth | Sydney George Smith | | 3,472 | William Sheat |
| Oamaru | Jack MacPherson | | 1,046 | John Kirkness |
| Oroua | John Cobbe | | Uncontested | |
| Otaki | William Hughes Field | | 1,321 | Jim Thorn |
| Pahiatua | Alfred Ransom | | Uncontested | |
| Palmerston | Jimmy Nash | | 1,245 | Joe Hodgens |
| Parnell | Bill Endean | | 4,821 | John William Yarnall |
| Patea | Harold Dickie | | 3,495 | William Simpson |
| Raglan | Lee Martin | Stewart Reid | 806 | Lee Martin |
| Rangitikei | James Thomas Hogan | Alexander Stuart | 15 | James Thomas Hogan |
| Riccarton | Bert Kyle | | 589 | Archibald McLachlan (Note: For some biographical details of McLachlan refer to his grandfather's article) |
| Roskill | George Munns | Arthur Shapton Richards | 171 | William John Holdsworth |
| Rotorua | Cecil Clinkard | | 57 | Alexander Moncur |
| Stratford | William Polson | | 1,518 | James McMillan (Note: McMillan claimed to stand for the Reform Party, but he was not the official candidate, as the United–Reform Coalition endorsed William Polson, who ran as an independent) |
| Tauranga | Charles Macmillan | | 658 | Bill Sullivan (Note: Bill Sullivan was a member of the United Party, but Charles Macmillan was the official candidate of the United–Reform Coalition, hence Sullivan stood as an independent) |
| Temuka | Thomas Burnett | | 1,237 | Bert Langford |
| Thames | Albert Samuel | | 464 | John Montgomerie |
| Timaru | Clyde Carr | | 820 | Herbert N. Armstrong (Note: The Reform and United parties could not agree on an official coalition candidate for the Timaru electorate, so neither Armstrong (Reform) nor Herbert Hall (United) were official candidates, and many sources show them as independents) |
| Waikato | Frederick Lye | | 981 | Solomon Ziman (Note: Ziman was the father of John Ziman) |
| Waimarino | Frank Langstone | | 591 | William Wackrow |
| Waipawa | Albert Jull (Note: Jull was the official candidate of the United–Reform Coalition) | | 386 | John Ormond, Jr. (Note: Ormond was the son of John Davies Ormond and the father of John Ormond) |
| Wairarapa | Thomas McDonald | Alex McLeod | 616 | Thomas McDonald |
| Wairau | Edward Healy | | 1,424 | William Girling |
| Waitaki | John Bitchener | | 885 | Alexander Paterson |
| Waitemata | Alexander Harris | | 2,378 | Arthur Osborne |
| Waitomo | Walter Broadfoot | | Uncontested | |
| Wallace | Adam Hamilton | | 2,842 | Peter Gilfedder |
| Wanganui | Bill Veitch | | 590 | Bill Rogers |
| Wellington Central | Peter Fraser | | 2,471 | Robert Darroch |
| Wellington East | Bob Semple | | 593 | Thomas Forsyth |
| Wellington North | Charles Chapman | | 1,061 | George Troup |
| Wellington South | Robert McKeen | | 2,659 | Will Appleton |
| Wellington Suburbs | Robert Wright | | 2,570 | Tom Brindle |
| Westland | James O'Brien | | 1,121 | John Greenslade |
Māori electorates
| Eastern Maori | Āpirana Ngata | | 3,211 | Pita Moko |
| Northern Maori | Taurekareka Henare | | 1,188 | Paraire Karaka Paikea |
| Southern Maori | Tuiti Makitanara | | 19 | Eruera Tirikatene |
| Western Maori | Taite Te Tomo | | 1,436 | Toko Ratana |

Table footnotes:

- Four of the eight independent MPs (Connolly, Hargest, McSkimming, and Polson) were aligned with the United–Reform Coalition, and are not classified as independents by some sources.
