= Minister of Mines (New Zealand) =

New Zealand minister of the Crown

The Minister of Mines in New Zealand was a former cabinet member appointed by the Prime Minister to be responsible for New Zealand's mining industries. The portfolio was abolished in 1977 and its responsibilities were assumed by the Minister of Energy.

== List of ministers ==
The following ministers held the office of Minister of Mines.

Key

Independent Liberal Reform United Labour National

No.	Name	Portrait	Term of Office		Prime Minister
1	William Gisborne		5 July 1879	8 October 1879	Grey
2	William Rolleston		15 December 1880	16 August 1884	Hall
2	William Rolleston		15 December 1880	16 August 1884	Whitaker
2	William Rolleston		15 December 1880	16 August 1884	Atkinson
3	James Macandrew		16 August 1884	28 August 1884	Stout
4	William Larnach		5 January 1885	8 October 1887	Stout
5	George Richardson		8 October 1887	17 October 1889	Atkinson
6	Thomas Fergus		17 October 1889	24 January 1891	Atkinson
7	Richard Seddon		24 January 1891	6 September 1893	Ballance
7	Richard Seddon		24 January 1891	6 September 1893	Seddon
8	Alfred Cadman		6 September 1893	21 December 1899	Seddon
9	James McGowan		21 December 1899	6 January 1909	Seddon
9	James McGowan		21 December 1899	6 January 1909	Hall-Jones
9	James McGowan		21 December 1899	6 January 1909	Ward
10	Roderick McKenzie		6 January 1909	28 March 1912	Ward
11	James Colvin		28 March 1912	10 July 1912	Mackenzie
12	William Fraser		10 July 1912	12 August 1915	Massey
13	William MacDonald		12 August 1915	22 August 1919	Massey
(12)	William Fraser		4 September 1919	27 July 1920	Massey
14	William Massey		3 April 1920	15 April 1921	Massey
15	George Anderson		15 April 1921	28 November 1928	Massey
15	George Anderson		15 April 1921	28 November 1928	Bell
15	George Anderson		15 April 1921	28 November 1928	Coates
16	Gordon Coates		28 November 1928	10 December 1928	Coates
17	Bill Veitch		10 December 1928	28 May 1930	Ward
18	Alfred Murdoch		28 May 1930	22 September 1931	Forbes
19	David Jones		22 September 1931	8 January 1932	Forbes
20	Charles Macmillan		8 January 1932	6 December 1935	Forbes
21	Paddy Webb		6 December 1935	27 June 1946	Savage
21	Paddy Webb		6 December 1935	27 June 1946	Fraser
22	James O'Brien		27 June 1946	19 December 1946	Fraser
23	Angus McLagan		19 December 1946	13 December 1949	Fraser
24	Bill Sullivan		13 December 1949	13 February 1957	Holland
25	John McAlpine		13 February 1957	12 December 1957	Holland
25	John McAlpine		13 February 1957	12 December 1957	Holyoake
26	Fred Hackett		12 December 1957	12 December 1960	Nash
27	Tom Shand		12 December 1960	11 December 1969	Holyoake
28	Norman Shelton		22 December 1969	7 February 1972	Holyoake
29	Les Gandar		7 February 1972	8 December 1972	Marshall
30	Fraser Colman		8 December 1972	12 December 1975	Kirk
30	Fraser Colman		8 December 1972	12 December 1975	Rowling
31	Eric Holland		12 December 1975	8 March 1977	Muldoon
32	George Gair		8 March 1977	6 October 1977	Muldoon

== See also ==
- Mining in New Zealand
