= Bill Veitch =

New Zealand politician

The Honourable Bill Veitch
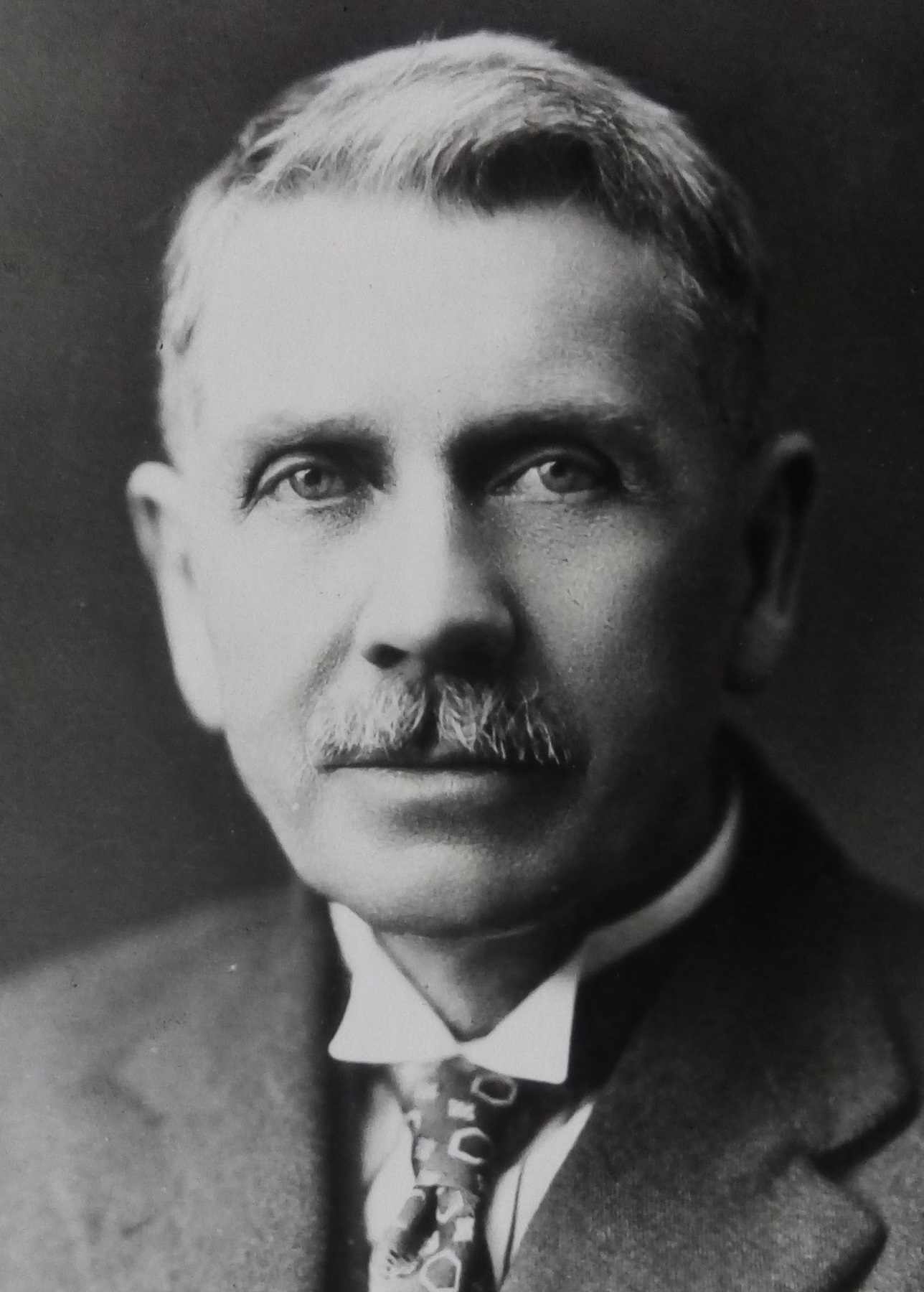

11th Minister of Railways
- In office 28 May 1930 – 22 September 1931
- Prime Minister: George Forbes
- Preceded by: William Taverner
- Succeeded by: George Forbes

1st Minister of Transport
- In office 10 December 1928 – 22 September 1931
- Prime Minister: Sir Joseph Ward; George Forbes
- Succeeded by: William Taverner

17th Minister of Labour
- In office 10 December 1928 – 28 May 1930
- Prime Minister: Sir Joseph Ward
- Preceded by: Robert Wright
- Succeeded by: Sydney Smith

11th Minister of Mines
- In office 10 December 1928 – 28 May 1930
- Prime Minister: Sir Joseph Ward
- Preceded by: Gordon Coates
- Succeeded by: Alfred Murdoch

Member of the New Zealand Parliament for Wanganui
- In office 19 December 1911 – 27 November 1935
- Preceded by: James Thomas Hogan
- Succeeded by: Joe Cotterill

Personal details
- Born: William Andrew Veitch; 25 May 1870 Port of Menteith, Perthshire, Scotland
- Died: 1 January 1961 (aged 90) Paraparaumu, New Zealand
- Party: United Labour (1912–16); Liberal (1922–28); United (1928–35); Democrat (1935); National (1943)
- Spouses: Emma Gurr (m. 1896; died 1944) Ann Davidson (m. 1951; died 1959)

William Andrew Veitch (25 May 1870 – 1 January 1961) was a New Zealand politician. He began his career in the labour movement, but became a strong opponent of more militant socialism, and rejected the radical views held by many of his colleagues.

== Early life ==
Veitch was born in Port of Menteith, a small town in Perthshire, Scotland. After receiving a basic education, at the same school his father was a teacher, he worked for the post and telegraph service until 1887. He then moved to New Zealand, briefly taking up gum digging before returning to telegraphs. In 1889 he gained employment with the New Zealand Railways Department, starting as a cleaner he eventually became an engine driver by 1908.

Veitch was stationed in various North Island towns for the duration of his career except for two years in Canterbury. During his time on the railways, he became active in the Amalgamated Society of Railway Servants, a rail-workers union. He was the secretary of the Cross Creek branch from 1904 to 1906 and then proceeded to become chairman of the Wanganui branch in 1907. In 1908 he was elected national president and would remain so until 1912. During the period he was president Veitch oversaw a large restructure of the union and presented petitions seeking improved pay and working conditions to Parliament. Veitch was also involved in local affairs, serving as a member of the Wanganui Harbour Board and later he was on the Wanganui River Trust Domain Board.

In comparison to other unionists at the time, Veitch was relatively moderate in his views, but was still dissatisfied with the government's response to various grievances. Believing that workers' goals were better served by political action than strikes, Veitch contested the Wanganui seat in the 1911 election, and defeated the incumbent MP, James Thomas Hogan. Despite there being two labour-aligned parties contesting the election, Veitch chose to stand as an independent Labourite.

== Parliamentary career ==
New Zealand Parliament
Years	Term	Electorate	Party
1911–12	18th	Wanganui	Independent Labour
1912–14	Changed allegiance to:		United Labour
1914–16	19th	Wanganui	United Labour
1916–19	Changed allegiance to:		Independent Labour
1919–22	20th	Wanganui	Independent Labour
1922–25	21st	Wanganui	Liberal
1925–28	22nd	Wanganui	Liberal
1928	Changed allegiance to:		United
1928–31	23rd	Wanganui	United
1931–35	24th	Wanganui	United
1935	Changed allegiance to:		Democrat

=== Early career ===
In Parliament, Veitch initially voted against the Liberal government of Sir Joseph Ward. This was part agreement he had made with the opposition Reform Party, which had offered him support in the second ballot of his election bid. After discharging this obligation, however, he immediately became a Liberal Party supporter, voting in favour of Ward only two days later. He seriously considered joining the Liberal Party, but when the new United Labour Party (ULP) was founded in 1912, Veitch opted to join that instead.

The following year, when the ULP agreed to merge with the Socialist Party to form the Social Democratic Party, Veitch was among those who rejected the move, and continued to work under the ULP banner. His primary concern with the new Social Democrats were clauses which required the party to support strikes, which Veitch believed were ineffective and unnecessarily disruptive to society. Most of the ULP dissenters were eventually re-united with the Social Democrats when the modern Labour Party was formed, but Veitch remained in Parliament as an independent Labourite, sitting in the house alongside Sydney George Smith the independent labour MP for Taranaki. In 1917, he unsuccessfully contested the Wanganui mayoralty. Despite predictions of a very close result, he was beaten comfortably by incumbent mayor Charles Mackay. Both Veitch and Smith were re-elected at the 1919 election as labour affiliated candidates, though both were in fact moving towards a closer alliance with the Liberals.

=== Liberal Party ===
In 1922, he finally joined what remained of the Liberal Party. The Liberals were disunited and disorganised, and Veitch was a significant figure in the party's rejuvenation. At the 1925 election the new Liberal leader George Forbes was not well known outside the South Island so the Liberal campaign in the North Island was run by Veitch instead. In 1928, Veitch joined his faction of the Liberals with others led by Forbes and Albert Davy, creating the United Party. Veitch and Forbes both contested the leadership of the new party, but in the end, the position was won by Sir Joseph Ward, a former Liberal Prime Minister, who had been brought in by Davy as a compromise candidate. Overlooked for the deputy leadership Veitch was then made president of the party.

=== United Government ===
When the United Party formed a government, Veitch one of the few members of the government with extensive parliamentary experience, became a member of Cabinet. New Prime Minister Sir Joseph Ward appointed him Minister of Transport, Minister of Labour and Minister of Mines. Ward resigned due to poor health in 1930 and contested the leadership of the United Party again. He was eliminated in the first ballot, with Forbes winning the role. When Forbes reshuffled the cabinet, Veitch dropped the mining and labour portfolios and was instead made Minister of Railways while also retaining transport. When United formed a coalition with the Reform Party in 1931, Veitch lost his position to make room for ministers from Reform. Later, when the coalition government devalued the currency, Veitch began to reject his party's leadership, and tried to convince William Downie Stewart to form a new party.

== End of Parliamentary career and later years ==
In 1935, unhappy with the coalition government, Veitch joined the newly created "anti-socialist" Democrat Party launched by Albert Davy. At the party's first conference he was elected deputy leader of the party for the North Island. He was then defeated in his re-election bid as a Democrat for Wanganui in the 1935 general election by the Labour candidate Joe Cotterill. His son Henry Charles Veitch stood at the next election in 1938 for the National Party (the successor to the United-Reform coalition) but also lost to Cotterill.

Considerably later, in 1943, Veitch stood for the National Party in the Wellington Suburbs electorate, but was unsuccessful, losing to Labour's Harry Combs.

Veitch died in Paraparaumu in 1961, survived by his six children.

== Awards and honours ==
He was awarded the King George V Silver Jubilee Medal in 1935 and the 1937 Coronation Medal for services to New Zealand.

== Personal life ==
He married Emma Elizabeth Gurr in Wanganui on 7 April 1896 with whom he had three sons and three daughters. Emma died in 1944 and he would remarry to Ann Sinclair Davidson on 19 May 1951 in Dunedin. Ann later died in 1959.

== Sources ==
- Bassett, Michael (1982). Three Party Politics in New Zealand 1911–1931. Auckland: Historical Publications. ISBN 0-86870-006-1.
- Gustafson, Barry (1980). Labour's path to political independence: The Origins and Establishment of the New Zealand Labour Party, 1900–19. Auckland, New Zealand: Auckland University Press. ISBN 0-19-647986-X.
- Hamer, David A. (1988). The New Zealand Liberals: The Years of Power, 1891–1912. Auckland: Auckland University Press. ISBN 1-86940-014-3. OCLC 18420103.
- Taylor, Alister (1998). The New Zealand Roll of Honour. Alister Taylor. ISBN 0-908578-58-X.
- Wilson, Jim (1985) [First ed. published 1913]. New Zealand Parliamentary Record, 1840–1984 (4th ed.). Wellington: V.R. Ward, Govt. Printer. OCLC 154283103.

New Zealand Parliament
Preceded by James Thomas Hogan	Member of Parliament for Wanganui; 1911–35	Succeeded by Joe Cotterill
Political offices
Preceded by Robert Wright	Minister of Labour; 1928–30	Succeeded by Alfred Murdoch
Preceded by Gordon Coates	Minister of Mines; 1928–30	Succeeded by Sydney Smith
New title	Minister of Transport; 1928–31	Succeeded by William Taverner
Preceded by William Taverner	Minister of Railways; 1930–31	Succeeded by George Forbes
