= William Taverner (New Zealand politician) =

New Zealand politician

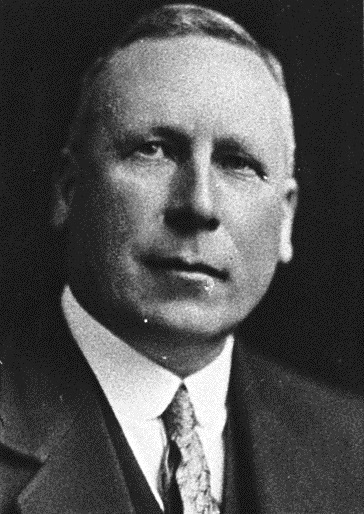
Taverner in 1928.

William Burgoyne Taverner OBE (16 August 1879 – 17 July 1958) was a New Zealand Member of Parliament for the United Party, and Mayor of Dunedin.

== Member of Parliament ==
New Zealand Parliament
Years	Term	Electorate	Party
1928–1931	23rd	Dunedin South	United

Taverner represented the Dunedin electorate of Dunedin South from 1928 to 1931 for the United Party, when he was defeated by Fred Jones.

Under Joseph Ward, he was Minister of Railways (1928–1930), Minister of Customs (1928–1929), and Commissioner of State Forests (1928–1930). Under George Forbes, he was Minister of Public Works (1930–1931), and Minister of Transport (1930–1931).

== Mayor and city councillor ==
Taverner was one of Dunedin's longest serving city councillors and was the mayor of Dunedin from 1927 to 1929. In 1935, he was awarded the King George V Silver Jubilee Medal. He was appointed an Officer of the Order of the British Empire in the 1953 New Year Honours, for services to the community.

== Sources ==
- Thomson, Jane (1998). Southern People: A Dictionary of Otago and Southland Biography. Dunedin: Dunedin City Council.
- Wilson, Jim (1985) [First ed. published 1913]. New Zealand parliamentary record, 1840–1984 (4 ed.). Wellington: V.R. Ward, Govt. Printer. OCLC 154283103.

Political offices
Preceded by Gordon Coates	Minister of Railways; 1928–1930	Succeeded by Bill Veitch
Preceded by William Downie Stewart Jr	Minister of Customs; 1928–1929	Succeeded by James Donald
Preceded by Harold Livingstone Tapley	Mayor of Dunedin; 1927–1929	Succeeded by Robert Black
New Zealand Parliament
Preceded by Thomas Sidey	Member of Parliament for Dunedin South; 1928–1931	Succeeded by Fred Jones
