= Alexander Stuart (New Zealand politician) =

Reform Party Member of Parliament in New Zealand (c. 1875–1954)

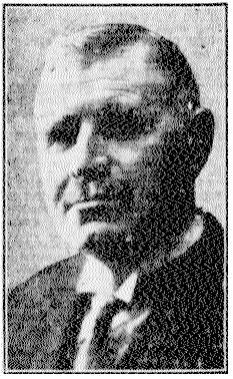
Photograph of Alexander Stuart, MP for Rangitikei

Alexander Stuart (c.1875 – 5 June 1954) was a Reform Party Member of Parliament in New Zealand.

New Zealand Parliament
Years	Term	Electorate	Party
1931–1935	24th	Rangitikei	Reform

He was elected to the Rangitikei electorate in the 1931 general election, but was defeated in 1935. He was awarded the King George V Silver Jubilee Medal in 1935.

New Zealand Parliament
Preceded by James Thomas Hogan	Member of Parliament for Rangitikei; 1931–1935	Succeeded by Ormond Wilson
