= James Thomas Hogan =

New Zealand politician

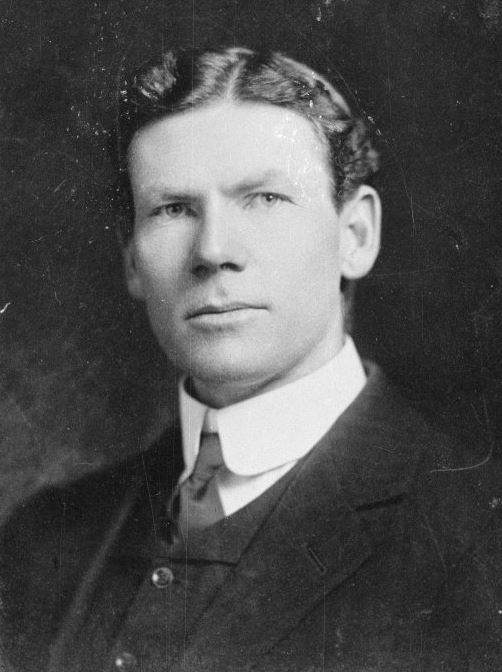

Member of the New Zealand Parliament for Wanganui
- In office 1905–1911
- Preceded by: Archibald Willis
- Succeeded by: Bill Veitch

Member of the New Zealand Parliament for Rangitikei
- In office 1928–1931
- Preceded by: Billy Glenn
- Succeeded by: Alexander Stuart

Personal details
- Born: 1 December 1874 Wanganui, New Zealand
- Died: 1 January 1953 (aged 78)
- Party: Liberal–Labour (1905–1911); Independent (1928–1931)

James Thomas Hogan (1 December 1874 – 1 January 1953) was an independent Member of Parliament for two electorates in the North Island of New Zealand.

Born in Wanganui, Hogan was a machinist in the railway workshops, and a trade union secretary.

== Member of Parliament ==
New Zealand Parliament
Years	Term	Electorate	Party
1905–1908	16th	Wanganui	Liberal–Labour
1908–1911	17th	Wanganui	Liberal–Labour
1928–1931	23rd	Rangitikei	Independent

Hogan represented the Wanganui electorate in the House of Representatives for six years from 1905 to 1911 as an independent Liberal–Labour member. Later, he returned to Parliament as an MP for Rangitikei between 1928 and 1931.

In 1935, he was awarded the King George V Silver Jubilee Medal.

New Zealand Parliament
Preceded by Archibald Willis	Member of Parliament for Wanganui; 1905–11	Succeeded by Bill Veitch
Preceded by Billy Glenn	Member of Parliament for Rangitikei; 1928–31	Succeeded by Alexander Stuart
