= Senior Whip of the Liberal Party =

Former party leadership position in the New Zealand parliamentary system

The Liberal Party's Senior Whip was a political post in New Zealand. The whip's task was to administer the "whipping in" system that attempts to ensure that party MPs attend and vote according to the party leadership's wishes. All Liberal whips were members of the House of Representatives with none coming from the Legislative Council. The position held high esteem in the Liberal caucus and it was not uncommon for whips to move into higher positions later on. Two (William MacDonald and George Forbes) would later serve as party leader. Forbes also served as Prime Minister from 1930 to 1935.

== List ==
The following is a list of senior whips of the Liberal Party (including United) up until the establishment of the National Party:

No.	Name	Portrait	Electorate	Term of Office	
1	Westby Perceval		Christchurch	19 June 1890	15 September 1891
2	Frank Lawry		Parnell	15 September 1891	29 October 1894
3	Charlie Mills		Wairau	29 October 1894	20 October 1900
4	Jack Stevens		Manawatu	20 October 1900	1 July 1902
5	Walter Carncross		Taieri	1 July 1902	25 November 1902
6	John O'Meara		Pahiatua	29 June 1903	3 July 1904†
7	Frederick Flatman		Geraldine	3 July 1904	29 August 1906
8	Alfred Kidd		Auckland Central	3 September 1906	10 October 1908
9	George Laurenson		Lyttelton	8 June 1909	28 June 1910
10	William MacDonald		Bay of Plenty	30 June 1910	15 June 1912
11	George Forbes		Hurunui	15 June 1912	7 February 1923
12	Sydney George Smith		New Plymouth	7 February 1923	16 June 1926
13	Alfred Ransom		Pahiatua	16 June 1926	4 December 1928
14	Alfred Murdoch		Marsden	4 December 1928	27 May 1930
15	George Munns		Roskill	27 May 1930	22 September 1931
(14)	Alfred Murdoch		Marsden	22 September 1931	13 May 1936

== See also ==
- Senior Whip of the Labour Party
- Senior Whip of the National Party
