= Hans Madsen Ries =

Hans Madsen Ries (5 December 1860 – 14 April 1926) was a New Zealand Lutheran pastor, farmer, businessman and local politician. He was born in Stenderup, Denmark in 1860. He was first elected as Mayor of Dannevirke in 1903, narrowly beating Alfred Ransom. He did not stand again in 1905, but was incensed by criticism of his leadership in the following year that he stood again and defeated the incumbent. He retired from the mayoralty in 1910, when he was succeeded by Ransom.
