= George Forbes (New Zealand politician) =

Prime Minister of New Zealand from 1930 to 1935

The Right Honourable George Forbes
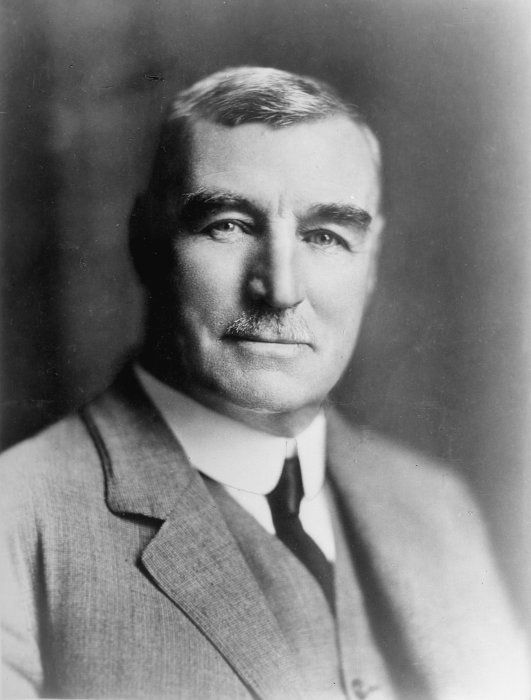
- Forbes c. 1930s

22nd Prime Minister of New Zealand
- In office 28 May 1930 – 6 December 1935
- Monarch: George V
- Governors-General: The Lord Bledisloe; The Viscount Galway
- Preceded by: Joseph Ward
- Succeeded by: Michael Joseph Savage

9th Leader of the Opposition
- In office 13 August 1925 – 4 November 1925
- Preceded by: Thomas Wilford
- Succeeded by: Harry Holland
- In office 6 December 1935 – 2 November 1936
- Preceded by: Michael Joseph Savage
- Succeeded by: Adam Hamilton

Personal details
- Born: George William Forbes; 12 March 1869 Lyttelton, New Zealand
- Died: 17 May 1947 (aged 78) Cheviot, New Zealand
- Party: Liberal (1908–1925); National Party (1925–1928); United (1928–1936); National (1936–1943)
- Spouse: Emma Serena Gee (m. 1898)
- Children: 3
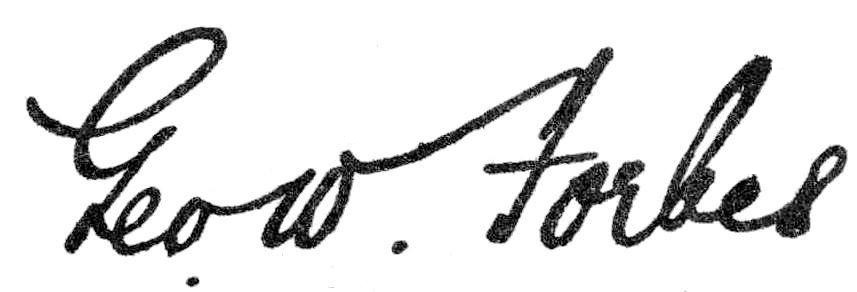
- Signature

George William Forbes PC (/fɔːrbz/; 12 March 1869 – 17 May 1947) was a New Zealand politician who served as the 22nd prime minister of New Zealand from 28 May 1930 to 6 December 1935. He was the last leader of the remnant of the Liberal Party having entered the House of Representatives in 1908 as a Radical in that party. Forbes was a co-founder of the United Party in 1927. Later he was a founder of the New Zealand National Party in 1936 and the party's first parliamentary leader.

Forbes was born in Lyttelton near Christchurch and he later began farming at Cheviot, North Canterbury. He became active in local politics. Forbes was first elected as a Liberal Party member of parliament in 1908 for the North Canterbury electorate of Hurunui. From the mid-1920s the Liberal Party changed its name twice and Forbes was elected leader in 1925, shortly after it had adopted the name National Party. He was the leader in 1928 when the party changed its name to the United Party, he was again elected leader in May 1930, and he initially led the newly created National Party in 1936. With the long decline of the Liberal Party since 1912, his rise to power as prime minister was somewhat unexpected, until he became the obvious successor to an increasingly incapacitated Sir Joseph Ward in 1930. It was his misfortune to take office during the very worst period of the Great Depression. He nevertheless remained in power for over five years. Forbes headed the United–Reform coalition Government that eventually became the current day New Zealand National Party.

Between 1925 and 1936 Forbes was a central figure in ending a long political division and constructing a united centre-right movement combining liberals, conservatives, moderate centrists, urban business interests, farmers, and provincial moderates into a single electoral force. The creation of the New Zealand National Party in 1936 formalised this realignment and this broad 'centre-right coalition' is one of the defining features of New Zealand politics to this day.

Often referred to as "Honest George", Forbes had a reputation for probity, considerable debating skill, a good memory, and that most essential of skills in a party leader, an ability to assess the mood of the House. A man of equable disposition and simple tastes, his courteous and friendly attitude earned him the liking and respect of parliamentarians from all sides of the House. Throughout his time in national politics his Hurunui constituents held Forbes in high regard: during his tenure as prime minister he would roll up his sleeves and help load sheep on the railway wagons for market. Illustrating the wide-spread sentiment about Forbes personally, even in the closing weeks of his government, Independent candidate and newspaper editor Oliver Duff opened his election campaign against Forbes in Hurunui in October 1935, telling his audience that, "Mr Forbes was precisely the kind of man most people thought he was. He had never seen a Prime Minister with less pretence or swank. He was courteous, fair, and a genuinely modest man."

== Early life ==
Forbes was born in 1869 in Lyttelton, just outside the city of Christchurch. Lyttelton was a bustling port town and the arrival point for settlors and others coming to Canterbury and the South Island. His father was Robert Forbes, a well-travelled sailor, then a prosperous ships' chandler and merchant, and his mother was Annie Adamson, originally from Ireland. He gained his education at Lyttelton Borough School and, after the family moved to Christchurch, at Christchurch Boys' High School. Christchurch Boys' High School was newly established as Forbes became a student there. It was founded in 1881 to prepare students for enrolment at Canterbury College, now the University of Canterbury, with the two institutions co-located at the centre of Christchurch, in what is known today as the Christchurch Arts Centre. With neighbouring Hagley Park as the principal venue, Forbes excelled at sports while at Boys' High. Upon leaving school, he was apprenticed through his father's connections at the Christchurch merchants Gardner and Pickering, and later he was employed in his father's business at Lyttelton. By his teenage years he had become known regionally for his ability at sports, particularly in athletics, as a rower with the Union Rowing Club, in sailing, as a member of the Christchurch Sailing Club, and in rugby, as a young player with the Gloucester Street Football Club, and later the East Christchurch Football Club, where he captained the team when it won the Christchurch rugby championship. Forbes became well known to the public in Canterbury and other provinces as the captain of the acclaimed Canterbury representative rugby team of 1892. He had two brothers who also played for the Canterbury representative rugby team and he continued to play some rugby himself after later moving to Cheviot.

New Zealand was experiencing the Long Depression of the late 1870s to the early 1890s as Forbes became a young man. Difficulties in taking up new farming land in Canterbury had become a serious issue by 1885 and Forbes' interest in politics was first stoked aged 16 after hearing Sir George Grey speak in Christchurch. It was furthered considerably by George Laurenson, originally the bookkeeper and later a business partner with his father, after which he was the Liberal member of parliament for Lyttelton from 1899 to 1913. In 1935 Forbes described the considerable early political influence of William Pember Reeves, explaining in a journal interview, that he, "began to associate with a man who became a member of Parliament. He injected the political virus into my veins. I stopped thinking of only my own existence, and became conscious of the problems of the world about me." The influential Reeves, himself another Lyttelton native and outstanding sportsman, had entered Parliament in 1887 for the Christchurch electorate of St Albans. Forbes (age 21) was a member of his political committee in 1890 when Reeves was returned as a member for the three-member electorate known as City of Christchurch. Reeves became well known as a Radical Liberal and was a Liberal Party minister and major influence on Liberal policy in the 1890s. He was later the Agent-General and High Commissioner in London and, thereafter, the Director of the London School of Economics, also chairing the National Bank of New Zealand from 1917 to 1931. William Pember Reeves wrote the acclaimed New Zealand history text, 'The Long White Cloud'. In this period Forbes was a founding member of the U.R.C. Debating Society that would meet fortnightly in Christchurch and he became versed in British political history despite not attending university. After his death in 1947, it was noted by Sidney Holland in parliament that the Parliamentary Librarian of the era, Dr. Scholefield, had informed Holland that Forbes was "one of the most widely read men" and he was later described as an "inveterate user" of the Parliamentary Library. Walter Nash was also recorded at the same time paying tribute to the fact that Forbes was a great reader, telling the House that Forbes had read more biographies and knew more about the political history of New Zealand and Britain than most.

The work by John McKenzie, Minister of Lands, and the acquisition by John Ballance's first Liberal government of the Cheviot Hills Estate in 1892–93 is considered a major episode in the land settlement history of New Zealand. The social and economic benefits of closer rural settlement through the leasehold land model, in which Forbes as a farmer settler became a part, was a defining feature of his political convictions.

The public ballot for the allocation of land on the Cheviot Hills Estate was held on the morning of 15 November 1893 at the Provincial Council Chamber in Christchurch. Six hundred and fifty-five applications had been received for fifty-four rural lease in perpetuity sections. The first name drawn in the first ballot was George Forbes. After also gaining a second adjoining leasehold farming block, in early 1894, at the age of 24, Forbes drove his spring-cart from Christchurch to Cheviot, North Canterbury. He spent the first night on his new land sleeping under a dray, then lived in a tent until the first homestead was built. Forbes went on to establish himself as a successful farmer on this land that he named Crystal Brook and which remained his home until his death.

Forbes quickly became active in local politics and affairs in North Canterbury and his first experience of an election as a political candidate for local government was in February 1895, where he comfortably polled ahead of two other candidates. He became a founding member of the Cheviot County Council, President of the Cheviot Settlers' Association, a founding member of the McKenzie Domain Board, President of the McKenzie Football Club, Treasurer of the Cheviot Athletic Club and a Director of the Cheviot Co-operative Diary Company. Forbes was also for several years a leading voice for the continuation of the railway from Christchurch to Cheviot. He was appointed by the premier Richard Seddon as a commission member on the 1905 Royal Commission on Crown Lands and, with others on the commission, he travelled extensively around the country. Forbes led the minority commissioners' view (6 to 5) in the published Royal Commission report in favour of the retention of leasehold land tenure as the better way to take up widespread rural land settlement.

Notably, Cheviot Hills has had four prime minister farmers associated with this North Canterbury land, Sir Frederick Weld at Stonyhurst, Rt. Hon. Alfred Domett at Mendip Hills, Forbes at Crystal Brook and Sir Sidney Holland at Greta Paddock.

In 1898, Forbes married Emma Serena Gee, daughter of Thomas Gee, another Cheviot settlor, known to Forbes from his Christchurch days. Forbes' brother-in-law Thomas Gee (Jnr.) also played a prominent part in early local body politics in the region. George and Emma Forbes had three children.

== Entry to parliament ==
New Zealand Parliament
Years	Term	Electorate	Party
1908–1911	17th	Hurunui	Liberal
1911–1914	18th	Hurunui	Liberal
1914–1919	19th	Hurunui	Liberal
1919–1922	20th	Hurunui	Liberal
1922–1925	21st	Hurunui	Liberal
1925–1928	22nd	Hurunui	Liberal
1928	Changed allegiance to:		United
1928–1931	23rd	Hurunui	United
1931–1935	24th	Hurunui	United
1935–1936	25th	Hurunui	United
1936–1938	Changed allegiance to:		National
1938–1943	26th	Hurunui	National

Forbes met with Richard Seddon in Wellington in 1899 and had extended an invitation to the premier to attend the Cheviot Agricultural Show. Seddon was in Cheviot a month later, with Forbes presiding at the local events during his visit. At the 1902 election, Forbes made his first attempt to enter national politics, standing for the Hurunui electorate. He stood as an Independent candidate, having not gained the Liberal Party nomination, which went instead to the large North Canterbury landowner Andrew Rutherford. Seddon had written to Forbes' friend George Laurenson in May 1902 regretting the inability to give Forbes a chance in the 1902 election; and, later, he sent a telegram to a supporter of the Liberal candidate Andrew Rutherford, stating that, both Rutherford and Forbes were acceptable, but Rutherford had a better chance of winning the seat. "Mr Forbes is an able man and a good Liberal, and his time will come later on" said Seddon. Forbes campaigned on a vigorous land for settlement policy, but did not win the seat in the 1902 election. At the 1908 election, however, he became the Liberal Party's official Hurunui candidate, and won the seat of Hurunui. Forbes would hold this seat continuously for thirty-five years, a continuing record in Canterbury.

Upon his retirement in 1943, after what was a long political career, Forbes was interviewed about being a Liberal, saying,"[Liberalism] is not something static, but changes to meet the needs of the time. It is a habit of mind." In his latter years as prime minister he was considered conservative and orthodox in financial policy, but as a new member of parliament, Forbes took a radical approach from his first moments in the House in 1909. As a champion of leasehold land settlement, he spoke first in June 1909 about the need to break-down the rural land monopolies and settle people on vacant lands to advance the cause of humanity. In October 1909 he spoke again at length to defend the continuation of leasehold land policies and land settlement in the face of increasing favour for freehold policies, including in his own Liberal Party. Forbes also formed an immediate and friendly association with Āpirana Ngata and he spoke strongly in favour of the need for Maori to be untied from legislation, to be treated fairly and justly in the settlement of their lands. Forbes addressed the House in October 1909 telling members, "I say that the Maoris are citizens of this country just as much as the white men are, and when we effect Maori settlement credit should be given for it in the same way as it would be given for white settlement, and not treated as if it was nothing. I say that the settlement of the Maori race on the land is quite as necessary as the settlement of Europeans." In his 17 November 1909 address to the House, Forbes then broke with some in his party, including his leader Sir Joseph Ward, to express his disappointment at the land proposals contained in the Budget and he expressed concern that enthusiasm for the Liberal Party would be killed by the surrender of its centrepiece leasehold policy of the past.

The Liberal Party had always been a coalition of factions and prided itself on so being. Forbes belonged to the Radical section of the Liberals and was considered one of the Canterbury 'progressives' along with Ell, Laurenson, Russell, Davey and Witty. He became the Liberal Party's Whip after four years in the House of Representatives, when party leader Thomas Mackenzie became prime minister in March 1912 and the Radical element of the party gained a foothold in Cabinet. Forbes retained his position of Whip when his party went into opposition on 10 July 1912. However, he had considerably higher status within the Liberal Party than his official responsibilities indicated, although few thought of him as a potential leader.

After the defeat of the Liberals in 1912, Mackenzie resigned as leader to become High Commissioner in London and once again Ward assumed the Liberal Party leadership. World War One resulted in a national government, combining Reform and Liberal under the leadership of Massey. In 1919, Ward and his Liberal colleagues resigned from the national government and, in the election of that year, Liberal was defeated, with Ward losing his own seat in parliament. William MacDonald was elected leader, but he died within the year, and Thomas Wilford was elected in his place. In 1920 Forbes became the deputy to Liberal leader Wilford, and did most of the work running the party administratively.

By the early 1920s, the Liberal Party faced a decision as to its political future, having become squeezed from the left by the relatively recently formed Labour Party and from the right by the Reform Party. The Reform Party government of William Massey dominated the New Zealand political scene from 1912, having secured a number of former Liberal members and the conservative vote. In early 1922 the parliamentary Liberal Party (having by now sometimes adopted the name Liberal-Labour, as first used by Seddon) fused together with several other parliamentary elements opposing Reform and was renamed United Progressive Liberal-Labour. Wilford was elected leader and Forbes was elected onto the new party's executive committee.

Many members of the Liberal Party, including Forbes, came to appreciate that a merger with the Reform Party was inevitable, seeing such co-operation as necessary to counteract the socialist and then somewhat militant Labour Party. When Massey died in 1925, the Liberal leader Wilford used the opportunity to approach Massey's successor with a merger proposal, suggesting that the new party could use the name 'The National Party'. The Liberal Party chose Forbes to lead their delegation at the 1925 merger conference with Reform. However, the new Reform Party leader, Gordon Coates preferred that the Liberals simply join Reform, and he rejected the Liberal proposal to instead form an entirely new party. Wilford declared that The Liberal Party would now take the name 'The National Party' regardless.

In a strong display in the House on 29 July 1925, Forbes challenged Coates and told the House that Coates had misled the public about the reasons for the merger failing. Forbes indicated that the Liberals had been prepared to give Coates sole charge of forming a new ministry with a new party, and he said, "We trusted the Prime Minister in a way that, speaking for myself, I have never before trusted any member of the Reform party, and I did not expect to be let down in the way I was." The missed opportunity for Coates to rearrange his ministry in 1925 and end the three-party system has subsequently been seen by commentators as a serious tactical blunder that had consequences for the decade ahead.

== Party leader, United Party formation and minister ==
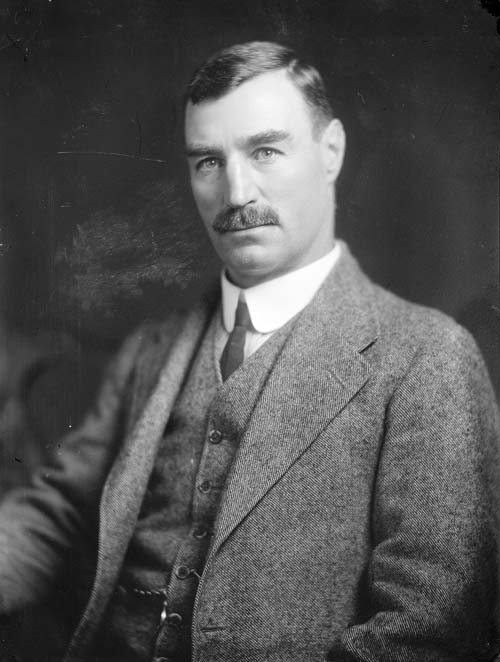
Forbes in 1914

In August 1925, a month after the merger discussions with Reform had ended, Wilford resigned as leader. Forbes was then elected Leader of The National Party (distinct from the modern day New Zealand National Party).

After several North Island public meetings in September, on 1 October 1925, Forbes issued the National Party's election manifesto, including, as he had first done in 1902, making the appeal for a State Bank, free from political control. Less than three months later, in the November 1925 election that took place, the party did very badly, gaining only eleven seats compared with Reform's fifty-five. To compound the injury, Forbes no longer held the post of Leader of the Opposition – the Labour Party had won twelve seats, enabling its leader Harry Holland to claim seniority in Opposition, although with two independents sitting in opposition as well the position of Leader of the Opposition remained vacant until Labour won the 1926 Eden by-election.

The National Party's poor fortune did not last long. After an initial public signal of support from Forbes in August 1927, in November 1927 Forbes entered into a formal alliance with Albert Davy, the well-known former Reform Party organiser who, along with a growing number of people, had become dissatisfied with Reform's paternalism and intrusive state governance. The National Party under Forbes became the parliamentary "nucleus" of the newly formed "United New Zealand Political Organisation" operating outside of parliament and the National Party later adopted the name United Party. The 1927 decision by Forbes to formally join his party with the United New Zealand Political Organisation was to prove pivotal in arresting the long decline for the Liberals. After the 1928 election, Albert Davy credited Forbes with the existence of the United Party; stating that he and Forbes had made an arrangement to create the new political organisation "long before anything was heard of the United party". Forbes toured the country with Davy during 1928, giving speeches advocating less bureaucracy and state interference in society, and securing candidates for the upcoming election. In the gathering momentum, William Veitch, the leader of a newly formed Liberal movement then joined United in April 1928. Forbes continued as leader of the new United Party until the party's conference of September 1928, when his name and the names of William Veitch, Alfred Ransom and Sir Joseph Ward were all put forward as candidates for the parliamentary United Party leadership. Ward had played no part in the United Party and been out of New Zealand since April 1928, returning only days prior to the September 1928 conference. Despite this, at the conference the position went to the elderly and frail Ward, with Forbes having committed his parliamentary party to support him, to encourage Ward to accept the leadership. Forbes became one of two deputy leaders, having particular responsibility for the South Island, although as Ward's health declined in the following eighteen months, Forbes increasingly took up the United Party leadership.

In the months leading up to the 1928 election the Liberals, now in their United colours, outlined their belief that Reform policy amounted to overt state interventionism and they expressed their faith in individualism, with the state's job being to protect and not to compete with individuals. Under the United banner, bolstered by Reform Party dissidents, the remnants of the old Liberal Party once again gained traction. At the 1928 election, United unexpectedly won as many seats as Reform, and formed a government with backing from the Labour Party. The arrangement between United and Labour did not mean the sharing of philosophy, it was purely expedient for both Parties to keep Reform out. The uneasy alliance was to last two years.

The 1928 election saw Forbes secure his largest majority in his Hurunui electorate in many years. Forbes became a Minister, with the portfolios of Lands; Agriculture; Lands for Settlements; Scenery Preservation; Discharged Soldiers' Settlement; and Valuation. Under previous administrations the weighty portfolios of Lands and Agriculture had been allocated to separate Ministers and Forbes became the first Minister to take on both. Forbes also became deputy to Ward as prime minister.

Forbes had been a constant advocate all his political career for the closer settlement of rural land to increase the country's agricultural production and exports. By late 1928 there was already an increasing need to address unemployment caused in the months preceding the onset of the Great Depression worldwide. New farms were seen by Forbes as sources of new employment. Upon gaining the portfolio of Minister of Lands in December 1928, a one million pound land development fund was soon announced, he set about touring new areas for settlement and drafting new legislation that eventually took the form of the Land Laws Amendment Act 1929 to promote this settlement of undeveloped lands.

In November 1929, age 60, Forbes became the oldest member of the House of Representatives in continuous service.

Ward had been in poor health for most of the 1920s, and continued to decline throughout his second tenure as prime minister. By the spring of 1929, Ward could no longer carry out his duties, leaving Forbes as acting prime minister in all but name. In May 1930 Ward finally resigned, but remained a member of the Executive Council. He died two months later. Forbes succeeded Ward as United Party leader and prime minister, he also served as Minister of Finance.

== First Forbes government ==
Taking office on 28 May 1930, Forbes became New Zealand's third native-born and the first Canterbury-born Prime Minister. Forbes' minority United Party continued to form government with the support of an increasingly reluctant Labour Party.

Shortly after Forbes became prime minister, Lord Bledisloe, the governor-general from 1930 until 1935, described Forbes to the king's then private secretary, Lord Stamfordham, as "universally respected by the N.Z. public and by politicians of all shades of opinion. He is a man of always polite speech and agreeable manner and without doubt the most popular member of the House of Representatives."

From May 1930 Forbes also served as minister of finance, minister of external affairs, minister of customs, minister in charge of scientific and industrial affairs, and minister in charge of High Commissioners Department.

Upon taking up the finance portfolio in May 1930, Forbes immediately issued a blunt public statement concerning the receding state of the economy. Commentators throughout the country, including newspapers aligned with the Opposition Reform Party quickly commended his courageous plain-speaking and plan to spend less. Business leaders also congratulated Forbes on his deflationary plans and considered him, "at all events, a safe and practical man of equable temperament, sane and sincere."

In mid-1930 Forbes oversaw the decision that his government would proceed to construct the country's National War Memorial, with a campanile and carillon, to stand alongside a proposed new National Art Gallery and National Museum at Mount Cook, Wellington. The construction of a national war memorial had been considered long-deferred by past governments and it was a brave decision to begin construction, together with plans for a national art gallery and museum, at a time of harsh economic recession. Forbes was chairman of the Board of Trustees that decided upon the design for the structures and later he laid the campanile's foundation stone on 16 May 1931.

Later in the year Forbes represented New Zealand in London at the 1930 Imperial Conference and, along with fellow Dominion Prime Ministers, dealt with legislative and economic matters affecting Britain and its Dominion countries. Forbes led a strong team and reports of his performance in Britain were positive. Stamfordham wrote to Bledisloe shortly after, telling him, "I should say that among all the Dominion Prime Ministers of the 1930 Imperial Conference, Forbes will be remembered with feelings of appreciation and respect." Carl Berendsen, who had joined the Prime Minister's Department in 1926 as Imperial Affairs Officer and who later became head of that Department and an Ambassador, accompanied Forbes to the London conference and in Berendsen's view, "He never pretended to be anything but transparently honest and sincere and he got through the conference with credit. In the countryside and the provincial cities as well as the capital he was well liked."

While in London, Forbes met with former New Zealand Liberal politician and old acquaintance, William Pember Reeves, a continuing advocate for Forbes' economic actions of the early 1930s. On 18 November 1930 Forbes had made a record-distance first telephone call between the United Kingdom and New Zealand, and then made the second call to his children at Cheviot. This call followed shortly after another pioneering communication, with Forbes participating a few months earlier in the first New Zealand produced film featuring people talking on screen.

On his final day in the UK, in December 1930, Forbes called on Prime Minister Ramsay MacDonald, met with the Deputy-Governor of the Bank of England and then left to visit WWI battlefields in France and Belgium with Major General Sir Fabian Ware, noted founder of the Imperial War Graves Commission, laying wreaths at memorials for fallen New Zealand soldiers.

Forbes was made a Privy Counsellor while in London in 1930 and he had an honorary Doctor of Laws (LL.D.) conferred on him by the University of Edinburgh and by the Queen's University of Belfast. He was also granted the Honorary Freedom of the City of London and the Honorary Freedom of the City of Edinburgh.

The Forbes government began to show signs of instability when the Labour Party indicated their impending withdrawal of confidence for United while Forbes was travelling home from the 1930 Imperial Conference. Labour expressed dissatisfaction with a number of the government's intended economic measures. Forbes intended them to reduce the government deficit and to stimulate the economy, but Labour claimed that they unnecessarily harmed the interests of poorer citizens.

Within days of arriving home from the 1930 Imperial Conference, Forbes publicly stated, "As long as I am Prime Minister of this Dominion, no payment will be made unless work is given for it." In Britain he had witnessed first-hand what he considered the "pernicious effect" of the "dole". Forbes became the last New Zealand prime minister to make a statement to this effect regarding unemployment payments.

By early 1931 Forbes and the Chairman of the United Party, Robert Masters, were once more seeking a fusion of the United and Reform parties, although it was to take several more months to convince Coates, his old mentor Sir Francis Bell and others in Reform. In March 1931, Labour made their stand, abandoning the confidence vote they had provided the United government since 1928.

Despite a world climate of worsening economic conditions, confidence in Forbes continued in 1931. His long-time friend and cabinet colleague, Sir Apirana Ngata noted that, "Since he returned from London we have all remarked [on] his confident handling of affairs and homeliness of his manner of stating problems. I suppose the great ones of the Earth have been and are men of a few simple great ideas, whose minds can wrap these round any accumulation of detail." Many now saw Forbes as a strong leader, mid-way between socialist and conservative extremes and prepared to put national interest first. Forbes was praised in London for setting "an example of prudent and courageous finance" for both the chancellor of the exchequer and the Australian prime minister. For the months that followed, Forbes had perforce to continue with reluctant support from the Reform Party, which now feared Labour's growing popularity.

Compounding the severe global and domestic economic decline taking hold, on 3 February 1931 the devasting Hawke's Bay earthquake struck, shattering Napier and Hastings, the surrounding towns and countryside. The earthquake was to be the country's worst natural disaster. Forbes was immediately required to lead the government's earthquake relief planning and the special legislative programme that followed. Parliament's next session was to start in June 1931, but in response to both the worsening economic conditions and the earthquake, Forbes announced that parliament was re-opening early, with an emergency session that commenced on 11 March 1931. The public regard for Forbes in 1931 was illustrated by a February editorial in the Daily Telegraph of Napier, whose plant and building had been destroyed days earlier by the earthquake, but who placed focus on his sense of duty and courageous economic stance.

In March 1931, Forbes took control of the business of the House of Representatives with a mechanism that past premiers such as Seddon had been unable to obtain. The 1931 Finance Bill had endured debate of nearly 100 hours, 70 divisions, and 10 days, and, in order to pass legislation in a timely way, Forbes introduced parliament's first "closure" mechanism under its standing orders. This new mechanism curtailing lengthy debate in the House was controversial, but New Zealand had one of the last parliaments without such a tool. It was to be used again by the Forbes government and, later, by the first Labour government whose leading members had fiercely resisted its introduction.

Later in 1931, Forbes was described by his soon-to-be Finance Minister William Downie Stewart Jr as "apathetic and fatalistic", reacted to events but showed little vision or purpose. At the same time, Stewart acknowledged that Forbes had to do "a rotten job". While Stewart was a senior member of the Reform Party, by 1931 he was an advocate of fusion between United and Reform and, despite his comments about Forbes, the two men were close. Opponents also criticised Forbes for relying too much on the advice of his friends and in particular Robert Masters.

On 12 March 1931, a scene described as, "almost unprecedented in Wellington", occurred at the steps of Parliament House, as a crowd of around 2000 gathered following a protest march, with a deputation intending to see Forbes about national wage reductions. The protest had been organised by the Labour movement and was addressed by Labour leader Harry Holland and the Secretary of the Alliance of Labour, James ('Big Jim') Roberts. Despite this extraordinary scene and the elements of hostility aimed at him and his government, Forbes decided to address the crowd personally, from the center of parliament's front steps, entirely surrounded by the crowd and the protesters. Later, many, including from within the Labour Party, would openly describe their admiration for Forbes' willingness to meet in this way and his "courage and temerity".

In April 1931, Forbes had called for a "grand coalition" of United, Reform, and Labour in the form of a National Government to resolve the country's significant economic problems caused by the worldwide depression. In a later assessment, Forbes described the mounting problems in this extraordinary period, saying, "We had reached the stage of a national emergency." Forbes told a 1931 joint conference of parliamentary parties that he would not implement the unprecedented legislative measures he deemed necessary without broad backing. United was a minority party in the House of Representatives and the Forbes government was governing outside of any coalition arrangements at a time of severe international economic crisis. "I have felt, and have said so on more than one occasion, that the handling of this situation is beyond the capacity of a minority government", Forbes openly told the House. On 29 April 1931 Forbes announced that he was prepared to participate in the formation of a new 'National Party' with Reform, to form a new government, and he publicly offered the resignation of his ministry, including his own resignation as prime minister. Labour refused to join any National Government. Although Coates, prompted by the Reform Party's finance spokesperson, William Downie Stewart Jr, eventually agreed, but only after some months of resistance from him.

On 31 July 1931, Forbes delivered his budget as finance minister, telling parliament that "..the year through which we have just passed has probably been the most difficult in the history of this Dominion." Forbes included reference to the proposed creation of a Reserve Bank amongst other significant measures that he prophesied would be of historical interest in the years to come.

The persistence by Forbes had finally produced results at the 'Special Economic Committee' (colloquially called the 'Big Ten', with three United, three Reform, three Labour and one Independent), with Forbes repeating at the committee meeting on 16 September 1931 that he wanted a "national government" and that United "was not prepared to commit itself to anything without the power to see it through." With that Coates finally yielded and Forbes announced to the House and the country on 18 September 1931 that New Zealand's first peacetime coalition government had been agreed between United and Reform.

On 22 September 1931, Forbes then announced the new coalition's Ministers and their portfolios, with Forbes retaining the position of prime minister and also taking on the portfolios of Railways, External Affairs, Scientific and Industrial Research, Public Trust, Electoral, and High Commissioner's Departments. Where Coates had failed in 1925 to take the opportunity to end the old three-party system, Forbes had now taken the first step in what was the beginning of the end for United and Reform as rivals. Historians would later see this moment of capitulation by Coates as the "real end of the Reform Party".

== Second Forbes government ==
Forbes occupies a unique place in New Zealand politics as the only person to have served as prime minister when leader of the minority coalition party in government. His coalition government formed in September 1931 and lasting until December 1935 was New Zealand's first peacetime coalition government.

In the 1931 election the United-Reform Coalition had done well, winning a combined total of fifty-one seats. Despite Forbes' United Party having 19 seats and Coates' Reform Party having 28 seats, Forbes remained the prime minister in the coalition government after the 1931 election. In his own seat of Hurunui Forbes secured the second-largest majority of votes, with his count being the largest absolute majority in the country. After the 1931 election, some in the press claimed that an increasing number of New Zealanders saw Forbes as the "hero of this fight" in the economic storm, and the "indispensable defence against almost irreparable disaster."

In mid-December 1931, Forbes resumed the finance portfolio for a temporary period while Downie Stewart attended a Canada trade meeting in Honolulu. Downie Stewart's absence coincided with one of the most extraordinary episodes in New Zealand's economic relationship with Britain and a financial crisis that had started with panic in Britain's money markets. On the evening of the 1931 general election, Downie Stewart described in his diary, "the most serious news I have ever had as a minister". On election day the New Zealand government had received a cable saying the position was so serious that New Zealand should remit £1,000,000 per month to London for the next 12 months, otherwise the position could not be coped with. Within the month, New Zealand's loan commitments were rearranged, with new short-term loans immediately ceasing. Forbes also announced that the government was to compulsorily pool sterling export credit in London to meet its obligations.

By 1932 Forbes was the second-longest serving member of the House of Representatives after Sir Āpirana Ngata. Early that year, Lord and Lady Bledisloe were on holiday in Paihia when, with the assistance of Vernon Reed, they explored a Waitangi farm property on the market, including the dilapidated Waitangi Treaty House. In secrecy the day after their tour, they commenced arrangements to acquire the property personally, with the intention of gifting it to the nation. In the three months that followed, Bledisloe and Forbes made confidential arrangements for ownership to vest not in the Crown but in a newly created Waitangi National Trust Board. The gift to the nation of 1000 acres and the Treaty House was announced by exchange of public letters between Bledisloe and Forbes on 10 May 1932, with each man serving as a trustee on the first board, along with representatives of the families of some Treaty signatories and others. Later in the same year, Bledisloe made a further gift of an adjoining 1,350 acres, with the intention of providing a revenue stream for the Trust Board.

Lord Bledisloe became familiar with both Forbes and Coates throughout this difficult period and his view of each man, recorded in his continuing correspondence to King George's private secretary from 1931, Sir Clive Wigram, was that Forbes, when not suffering from overwork, was patient and phlegmatic and difficult to provoke, whereas Coates was jumpy and indiscreet. Two months after swearing in the new coalition government in 1931, Bledisloe's report to the king made clear his apprehension that Coates' outspoken criticism of his new colleagues might split the new cabinet, but that the risk was being averted by the skilful diplomacy of Downie Stewart and "the placid good humour and imperturbability" of Forbes. Despite Coates' increased influence in government, Bledisloe's view of him as contained in his continuing written reports to the king did not improve. On 7 March 1932 Bledisloe wrote to Wigram, telling him that Coates was "thoroughly unstable, insensitive to criticism, imprudently outspoken in public and (I regret to say), disloyal to his colleagues".

In conjunction with the Finance Bill of May 1932, Forbes demonstrated his recent election advantage, making the case in the House for a 1 year extension to parliament's term. Forbes made clear that the coalition Parties had recently asked electors for "a free hand" given the economic situation and that his new government had received this mandate. In 1932 the term of the then parliament was extended until 23 December 1935 by the Finance Act 1932 (section 35). Prior to the first entrenchment provisions found in the Electoral Act of 1956, parliament could and did change its term without the need for a referendum or a special majority in the House. From 1852 the term of parliament was 5 years. Future parliamentary terms were then reduced to 3 years from 1879. The term of parliament was then extended by a year in 1916 and again for another year in 1918, in connection with World War I. Later, in September 1932, Forbes announced that cabinet had decided to bring forward legislation to institute four-yearly parliaments for the future and the first reading of an Electoral Amendment Bill was heard in the House in November 1932. Quoting the major liberal philosopher John Stuart Mill, in August 1934 Forbes made the case in the House for permanent four year parliamentary terms, which then became constituted in October 1934 under the Electoral Amendment Act 1934. The first Labour government was elected in late November 1935 with Forbes' four year parliamentary term. Labour was not opposed to 4 year parliamentary terms, but they considered a public referendum for this sort of constitutional change essential. In 1937 the first Labour government repealed the 1934 legislation without a public referendum and returned future parliaments to three year terms.

Forbes took little interest in his ministers' work and had a very hands-off approach to leadership. He was either unable or unwilling to look beyond the economic orthodoxy of austerity. His policies were uninspiring with budget cuts, minimal wage relief work schemes and civil service pay cuts being implemented. During this time of fiscal restraint by his government, a story was leaked that Forbes indulged in the personal luxury of going to the movie theatre twice a week. However, sources of disinformation about Forbes appear to have occasionally arisen from the office of Gordon Coates and, coincidentally, a story about going to the pictures twice a week was first reported in parliament on 27 September 1932, when Labour member Robert Semple questioned Forbes about an interview given by Gordon Coates to the San Francisco Chronicle. It was Coates who had reportedly told the newspaper that New Zealand city-bred folk were heading to the countryside, where they were provided with houses and taken to the pictures twice a week.

Slowly, however, many people came to believe that Coates held significantly more influence and that Forbes showed himself over-willing to give in to Coates' demands. Forbes had surrendered his finance portfolio to Reform's Downie Stewart in the September 1931 coalition arrangement. Stewart was overseas for long periods in late 1931 and in 1932. Forbes took up the portfolio again himself as the "economic blizzard" "continued with unabated force" and, as it eventuated, he served as acting minister of finance for almost half of Stewart's tenure in the role. In April 1932 Stewart took the unusual decision as Finance Minister not to accept collective cabinet responsibility for the controversial National Expenditure Adjustment Bill 1932, leaving Forbes to personally shepard the Bill through the House in Forbes' name.

Change in the Forbes government then came in early 1933 after a cabinet decision to devalue the New Zealand pound. This controversial change had been advocated by Coates and agreed to by cabinet after a series of meetings in January 1933. Stewart had argued with his cabinet colleagues over the decision and, much to his personal disappointment, Forbes lost him in the process, with Stewart resigning all of his portfolios. Stewart had expected Forbes to take up the finance portfolio once more, but, with Stewart gone, Coates wrote to Forbes and threatened to break-up the coalition government if he did not get finance himself. Choosing government stability at a time of economic crisis, Forbes passed the finance portfolio to Coates who, on the day of the change, told his economic adviser Dick Campbell that he (Coates) didn't know anything of public finance, but Campbell was supposed to. The events of January 1933 had caused Bledisloe to become involved directly, unsuccessfully attempting to convince Downie Stewart to stay in his role. Later in February, Bledisloe wrote to Wigram to report, telling him that he would not be surprised if Forbes were to resign, and stating, "If he does I shall find it difficult to send for Coates. He is v. dangerous." Following the resignation of Stewart, Forbes also took on the role of Attorney-General for almost three years, becoming the first person to hold this position as chief Law Officer of the Crown who was not himself a barrister or solicitor.

Forbes represented New Zealand at the World Economic Conference in London in June 1933. Leaving his finance minister Coates behind, Forbes took with him on his team Robert Masters, the Minister of Industries and Commerce. The route included stops in Ottawa, Los Angeles, New York and Washington D.C., where Forbes met with President Franklin D. Roosevelt at the White House.

On 22 October 1933, disaster struck for Forbes and his family. Their home near Cheviot, first built by Forbes after his arrival in the area in 1894, was destroyed by fire. Except for an old clock, all the contents, including Forbes' records, were lost.

In mid-1934, talk of United and Reform permanently fusing intensified, with United members once more leading the effort. However, Coates again resisted the calls for this new party, despite the emergence of a new rival in the form of the Democrat Party in October 1934. Funded by Auckland businessman William Goodfellow and led outside parliament by political organiser and "coat-changer" Albert Davy, the Democrat Party went on to contest the 1935 general election, taking much needed votes from United and Reform.

Forbes made a widely reported major speech in July 1934 at Cheviot, outlining the sobering financial and social challenges faced by the country and his government during the period of its administration to that date. Amongst the statistics provided by Forbes in his speech, he set out the scale of the unprecedented fall in national income, resulting from a 40 percent decline in export receipts between 1929 and 1932. In his speech he also defended the 1933 exchange rate change and his own position, explaining that market forces of supply and demand had ceased to provide the answer, so his government had acted on the policy change in the national interest. However, his wide ranging assessment was tempered with the cautious view that there were signs of national prosperity once more.

In October 1934, Forbes reluctantly accepted the resignation of his friend and colleague Sir Āpirana Ngata as a minister, as a result of a commission report into Ngata's Native Affairs department. Forbes took on the ministerial portfolios of Native Affairs and Cook Islands himself, and, from April 1935, he was also chairman of the Board of Native Affairs.

Forbes and his team were again in London in May 1935, this time for the king's silver jubilee celebrations, ministerial discussions, and trade meetings. During his trip he joined other prime ministers at various state functions, including making an appearance in front of crowds with the Royal Family on the balcony at Buckingham Palace and staying with Prime Minister Ramsay MacDonald at Chequers. Before leaving for London, Forbes had issued a public statement about the trip and the state of economic affairs, and Forbes and Coates had also issued a joint statement regarding the continuation of their coalition. With that lead, an amalgamation between the United and Reform parties in the form of the National Political Federation was announced in May 1935, with the parliamentary parties operating as the "National Government" and a single Dominion executive council formed for the United and Reform extra-parliamentary organisations.

At a Dunedin public meeting on 23 September 1935, shortly before the 1935 election, William Downie Stewart Jr complained that, "the Prime Minister is too passive and the Minister of Finance too active". While this quote has often been republished, Downie Stewart made this comment in the context of an announcement that he would run in 1935 as an Independent Nationalist and that, in his view, the entire Cabinet required reconstruction. Both Forbes and Coates increasingly took the blame for the country's ongoing economic problems and could not avoid the growing public dissatisfaction. Coates' acquisition of the finance portfolio coincided with more imaginative approaches taking place. These included a devaluation of the currency to improve export prices, giving mortgage relief for farmers and the creation of the Reserve Bank. Forbes never conceived any such initiatives of his own and was a passive bystander in decision making. However, despite these and other later perceptions, in 1930, prior to the United coalition with Reform, Forbes had also been Minister of Finance and, in creating the Reserve Bank, it was Forbes who in July 1930 invited Otto Niemeyer of the Bank of England to New Zealand and commissioned him to report on establishing a central bank. Later, in December 1932 and, prior to Coates becoming Minister of Finance, Forbes introduced the Reserve Bank Bill to the House, following the Bill's drafting during his second period as acting minister of finance between the end of June 1932 and late November 1932. These ministerial actions by Forbes continued his longtime advocacy for the creation of a State Bank, from his first campaign in 1902, through to the National Party election manifesto of 1925, and his call in 1927 for the creation of a special Committee of the House to address banking reform, including a State Bank. It was also Forbes who had first introduced the Mortgagor's Relief Bill to parliament in March 1931, before the coalition with Reform or the involvement of Coates. Later, he boldly shouldered his government's justification of the significant exchange rate change of 20 January 1933, with Coates not taking up his new finance portfolio until some days later on 28 January 1933.

In October 1935, the National Government set out its record and manifesto for the upcoming 1935 general election. Despite the significant turn-around in the country's books, from an estimated deficit of more than 8 million New Zealand pounds in 1931, to budget stability and a surplus of 1.6 million New Zealand pounds by March 1935, the severity of the period had left its mark. The election of 1935 on 27 November remains New Zealand's only general election conducted on the basis of a four-year parliamentary term. In that election the Labour Party defeated the coalition government, gaining fifty-three seats in the House of Representatives to the National Political Federation's nineteen. Notwithstanding the scale of Labour's sweeping election victory, in Hurunui, Forbes was returned with a comfortable majority. In Kaipara, Coates only narrowly secured his seat. Forbes was noted for his gracious and sporting concession speech delivered to the country over the radio on the night of the 1935 election. He then called his final cabinet meeting for Saturday 30 November 1935, and there resolved that there would be a short handover to the new Labour government in less than a week. On Wednesday 4 December 1935, Forbes tendered his resignation as prime minister to the governor-general, ending his premiership on 6 December 1935.

The close of the second Forbes government ended what some called "the most difficult chapter in New Zealand history", tempered by the sense that it had "chose[n] to place country always above party", with budget stability finally restored. As the New Zealand professor of economic history G. R. Hawke stated in his 1985 assessment of the period, "It is difficult to believe that any other conceivable government would have improved on the record of the Coalition." Labour member of parliament John A. Lee, had been in the House of Representatives with Forbes since 1922. Writing in 1965, he described Forbes as a man who always wanted to be a progressive, but who had been in an economic labyrinth. Lee wrote, "The Rt. Hon. George Forbes was the kindliest New Zealander who ever became the recipient of massive abuse. He inherited both the depression and his orthodox advisers and got the blame for both."

To be prime minister, a party leader must assure the governor-general that the party the person leads has the confidence of the House of Representatives to be government. Throughout his tenure as prime minister, Forbes' United Party held only a minority of seats in the House of Representatives and, in that period, less seats than Gordon Coates' Reform Party. His continuous tenure as prime minister, for five and a half years, in a minority party, governing only with the hesitant support of Parties who were themselves sizable rivals for government, in combination with the extraordinary economic and social conditions of the Great Depression, was noteworthy.

In 1935, Forbes was awarded the King George V Silver Jubilee Medal, and later in 1937 he was awarded the King George VI Coronation Medal.

== National Party formation ==
On 4 December 1935 just days after the general election, Forbes was elected leader of the Parliamentary National Party (then the name of the parliamentary party for the National Political Federation) despite a majority of the parliamentary caucus being legacy Reform Party members. He became Leader of the Opposition on 6 December 1935 and, later, he was the founding parliamentary leader of the new National Party (created out of United and Reform) from 14 May 1936 until 31 October 1936, when Adam Hamilton was elected the parliamentary leader in succession.

In private correspondence to his friend and former cabinet colleague William Downie Stewart Jr, sent a few days after parliament resumed in March 1936, Forbes wrote that, he had enjoyed the time since the election and also told Stewart that he agreed with his description of Prime Ministerial office as "slavery that is miscalled power". Despite these personal feelings and the relief he told Stewart he felt after the pressures of office, Forbes remained the only parliamentary party leader between 1925 and 1936 to have consistently called for the formation of the National Party and a formal fusion between United and Reform was foremost in mind following the 1935 election.

Forbes had a long track record of attempting to merge Liberal / United and Reform. He had led the Liberal Party delegation in fusion discussions with Reform in 1925, he had pushed hard for a coalition government with Reform in 1931 and for the fusion of 1935 in the form of the National Political Federation. In February and April 1936, Forbes and others on the Dominion Executive of the National Political Federation agreed to call a conference of members and supporters to form The New Zealand National Party. Of these Dominion Executive members who agreed to form a new party, only Coates stood in opposition once more, dissenting, and telling other members he would prefer "to wait and see".

On 13 May 1936, Forbes officially welcomed almost 250 delegates to a conference in Wellington and, over two days, a new political organisation outside of parliament was formed and named The New Zealand National Party. At the same time the former Reform, United and National Political Federation organisations were ended. The Parliamentary National Party had been left intact, with Forbes as leader and all its members joining The New Zealand National Party. Forbes was an initial member of the Dominion Council Executive of The New Zealand National Party.

Finding the successor to Forbes as leader of the Parliamentary National Party was to prove a contentious episode in the months following May 1936. In late July 1936 Forbes told the new National Party president, Sir George Wilson, that he was quite willing to resign as leader when the "Moses should arise" to take his place, but he had not yet seen the "Moses". Wilson, previously a Reform Party executive from Auckland, was working with Gordon Coates and others on securing a candidate from the former Reform side, Forbes and Robert Masters were working on different solution.

Led by several former Reform Party members now serving on the National Party's executive outside of parliament, on 19 August 1936 there was an unsuccessful extra-parliamentary attempt to influence a change in leadership from Forbes to Adam Hamilton, a former Reform member and Postmaster-General in the coalition government. However, the New Zealand National Party had been formed with a written constitution that carefully kept the parliamentary and extra-parliamentary sections of the new party separate, with neither controlling the other. In response to the brazen extra-parliamentary activity, on the same day, the Parliamentary National Party (now the name of the parliamentary party for The New Zealand National Party) passed and then handed to the press a formal resolution, stating, "That the party reaffirm their loyalty to Mr. Forbes and pledge themselves to support him as leader of the Party". The parliamentary party had made clear that selecting the Party's leader was the exclusive right of those in parliament.

Forbes and many in the new National Party wanted the next leader to be untarnished by the years of government previously, and in September 1936 Forbes invited the experienced independent member of parliament Charles Wilkinson to join the National Party. Wilkinson went on to contest the leadership election on 31 October 1936.

Following the events of the preceding months, in October 1936 a small number in the Parliamentary National Party, led by Coates and including Hamilton, then threatened to break away from the newly formed New Zealand National Party and restart the Reform Party if Hamilton was not elected leader in succession to Forbes. On the afternoon of Saturday 31 October 1936, as had been agreed in August, Forbes resigned as leader in a meeting of caucus and he then conducted the leadership election for his successor. Despite reports of Wilkinson having had the backing of a majority of caucus, with Coates' threat hanging over them, Adam Hamilton was elected by caucus as the next leader, with a narrow margin of one vote. Forbes then issued a public statement telling the country that, after the defeat of the 1935 election, he had felt it was his duty to disregard his personal inclinations and to carry on as leader of his party until matters had settled and a wise decision regarding his successor was made; and he asked members and supporters to rally around Hamilton and give him their loyalty. Days later the National Party's first president, Sir George Wilson, abruptly resigned in connection with the controversial election.

In comparing Forbes and Coates in 1936, Clyde Carr, a Labour MP and then Labour Party President, wrote of Forbes, "The mantle of Cincinnatus will, I think, fit him rather better than his colleague, Mr. Coates."

By 1936 Forbes had been instrumental in political party leadership for over a decade. He had understood for all that time that the anti-Labour forces had to be re-aggregated and he was willing to sacrifice the Liberal/United brand to achieve it. In the Liberal remnant National Party (distinct from the modern party), becoming its leader in 1925; he had co-founded the United Party in 1927-8 by merging his parliamentary party with Albert Davy's extra-parliamentary organisation; and, after many years of merger advocacy, playing a leading role in the 1936 United-Reform fusion to create the modern New Zealand National Party. Forbes' even temperament had played a significant part in keeping a fragile coalition together during extreme economic conditions and conservative politics in New Zealand emerged from the Depression unified rather than fragmented.

== Opposition and retirement ==
While others now took a lead, Forbes remained active in the House and in the National Party caucus after 1936. He was on the Opposition front-bench until 1943 and he served periodically as deputy Leader of the Opposition, being the bridge to the former Liberals within the newly fused National Party caucus.

By late 1938, only three years after the end of the Forbes government, New Zealand had reached another financial crisis. Such was the Labour government's precarious financial position that the governor of the Bank of England was to address finance minister Walter Nash in 1938 with the words, "I won't say you're bankrupt, but you have no credit." In response to the credit difficulties, in 1939 a prominent member of the Labour government publicly made suggestions amounting to the possible repudiation of New Zealand's debt. Dealing once more in the familiar territory of sovereign credit and reputation, Forbes took the lead for the National Party and he moved a motion in parliament that, the House of Representatives "has no sympathy with any suggestion of repudiation", requesting that the House firmly send a message to the world that New Zealand would pay her debts. In the seriousness of the moment and with Forbes' motion, the Speaker invited the prime minister to consider it a confidence motion. The following month, in September 1939, it was the German invasion of Poland that diverted the attention of the country's anxious creditors.

With echoes of late 1936, mounting extra-parliamentary National Party influence in 1940 resulted in Sidney Holland replacing Adam Hamilton as Leader of the National Party and Leader of the Opposition. Forbes was seen as Holland's mentor in his early years, with Holland describing Forbes as "a tower of strength".

As a former prime minister and elder statesman, Forbes was consulted and he spoke publicly about the country's war administration from 1940. With Labour and National negotiating the formation of a war administration in mid-1940, Forbes spoke strongly in favour of the formation of a new national government. According to Prime Minister Fraser, from the outbreak of the war, he had invited Hamilton, Forbes and Coates "into consultation with the government", sharing war cables and information with these three senior Opposition members. However, Coates and Hamilton then agreed to join as ministers in a Labour war cabinet, with some National Party colleagues and supporters believing they had not negotiated hard enough and had accepted Labour's invitation to this lesser form of war time administration too soon. As Holland later recorded, "Neither Mr Hamilton nor Mr Coates was altogether on side with our team. They used to tell us exactly nothing of what went on at War Cabinet meetings..." Later, Forbes robustly defended Holland's decision to leave the war cabinet only three months after he joined it in June 1942. In September 1942, the National caucus made the decision to leave the war administration altogether and, in a confidence motion before the House in October 1942, Coates and Hamilton made their break, voting in opposition to their party and rejoining Labour's war cabinet. The relationship between Coates and his party leader Holland was over. The political career of Coates was to end with his untimely death in parliament in May 1943, having declared shortly prior that he was leaving the National Party to run as an Independent in the upcoming 1943 election. Forbes then became the only living past prime minister.

In 1943 Forbes retired after 35 continuous years as a Member of Parliament. He had announced his intention was to retire in 1943 much earlier in March 1941. His long number of years in the House of Representatives remains a record for Canterbury and, in combination with Sir Joseph Ward's return of 1928, he had succeeded in leading the Liberals from their years of decline into the form of the long-living National Party, becoming one of the key architects of the modern non-Labour alignment. He declined the offer of a knighthood and in May 1947, four years after his retirement, he died at Crystal Brook, his farm near Cheviot. Shortly after, his family declined the government's offer of a State Funeral in favour of a ceremony for him at Cheviot.

Following his death, the prime minister, Peter Fraser, told the House that as a young member, he had "never met any one more kindly or more helpful, or who would give sounder or more friendly advice" than Forbes and, in ending his tribute, Fraser also stated his appreciation of Forbes, "most of all, as a man of sterling character and integrity and as a good friend."

Interviewed by a Scottish journal two months before the 1935 election, Forbes was quoted stating what he believed life had taught him and, using a farming metaphor, he said, "That the world is a straight furrow stretching before me. It is up to me to plough that furrow, to remove all stones and obstacles, to fill in any gaps, to leave a better path for myself and for all who later come that way."

The national memorial to Forbes, the George Forbes Memorial Library, forms part of Lincoln University near Christchurch.

== Citations ==
Government offices
Preceded by Joseph Ward	Prime Minister of New Zealand; 1930–1935	Succeeded by Michael Joseph Savage
Political offices
Preceded by Bill Veitch	Minister of Railways; 1931–1935	Succeeded by Dan Sullivan
Preceded by William Downie Stewart	Attorney-General; 1933–1935	Succeeded by Rex Mason
New Zealand Parliament
Preceded by Andrew Rutherford	Member of Parliament for Hurunui; 1908–1943	Succeeded by William Gillespie
Party political offices
Preceded by Thomas Wilford	Leader of the Liberal Party; 1925–1928	Succeeded by Joseph Ward
Preceded by William MacDonald	Senior Whip of the Liberal Party; 1912–1923	Succeeded by Sydney George Smith
