= United Party (New Zealand) =

- Founded: 1927
- Dissolved: 1936; 90 years ago
- Preceded by: Liberal Party
- Merged into: National Party
- Ideology: Classical liberalism
- Political position: Centre to centre-right
- National affiliation: United–Reform Coalition (1931–1936)
- International affiliation: Radical International

The United Party was a political parliamentary party in New Zealand. It was founded in 1927, partly out of the remnants of the Liberal Party, and formed the United Government between 1928 and 1931, and the United–Reform coalition Government between 1931 and 1935. In 1936, it merged with the Reform Party to form the National Party.

According to one study, the United Party was "more right-wing than the Reform Party under Joseph Gordon Coates."

== Foundation ==
In the 1920s the Liberal Party, although previously dominant in New Zealand party politics, seemed in serious long-term decline following the advent of the Reform Party in 1909 and the Labour Party in 1916, and its organisation had decayed to the point of collapse. The United Party represented an unexpected resurgence of the Liberals, and some historians consider it nothing more than the Liberal Party under a new name.

The United Party emerged from a faction of the decaying Liberal Party known as the National Party (not directly related to the modern National Party, although it may have inspired the name). George Forbes, a Liberal Party leader, led the faction. In November 1927, Forbes joined the National Party with Albert Davy's newly formed "United New Zealand Political Organisation" outside of parliament. Albert Davy was a well-known and highly successful political party organiser, formerly for the Reform Party, the traditional opponent of the Liberals. The parliamentary National Party changed its name to the United Party in 1928 and Forbes initially continued to led the parliamentary party pending the further amalgamation of former Liberals later in 1928. Bill Veitch, leader of another Liberal faction and a former labour movement figure, brought his parliamentary group into alliance with Forbes, Davy, and the United Party in 1928. They aimed to win support not only from former Liberals but also from moderates on both the right and left of the Liberal Party by presenting itself as a safer alternative than the Labour Party.

In September 1928, Forbes and Veitch both contested the leadership of the United Party, but eventually, Joseph Ward won the position. Although Ward, a former Liberal Prime Minister in 1906 – 1912, did not enjoy good health, Davy backed him as a compromise candidate and had invited him to contest the leadership. Robert Masters was the chairman of the United Party from its formation.

The reversal of the party fortunes came largely in Auckland, where the big business group abandoned the Reform Party because of the handling of a licensing bill, and put forward a programme equally appealing to the business community and to the remnants of the Liberal Party. So 42,000 votes and five seats went to United, compared with 8,800 votes and no seats in the previous election.

== Success ==
In the 1928 elections, the new United Party performed surprisingly well, winning twenty-seven seats. The Reform Party also had twenty-seven seats, the Labour Party had nineteen, the Country Party had one, and independents held six. The United Party formed a government with the backing of the Labour Party, and Ward became Prime Minister again.

The United Party administration did not run particularly smoothly, however. Ward's ill health persisted, and he finally resigned in 1930. His deputy, George Forbes, became Prime Minister, though he had effectively been leading both the party and the government for some time before Ward's formal departure. Following the termination of A. E. Davy as chairman of the United New Zealand Political Organisation in early 1930, E. E. Hammond had become the chairman of United's organisation outside of parliament. Hammond who had previously been involved with the Reform Party, later went on to become involved with the New Zealand Legion, before becoming active in the National Political Federation and the New Zealand National Party.

As prime minister and leader of the United Party from May 1930, Forbes faced serious economic problems, including the growing effects of the Great Depression. He did not project an image of activity or leadership — William Downie Stewart Jr, finance spokesman for Reform, privately described Forbes as "apathetic and fatalistic", and suggested that although he had "a rotten job", Forbes was really simply marking time.

== Coalition ==
In 1931 the United government passed a number of economic measures which appeared unfavourable to workers, and the Labour Party withdrew its support. The United Party continued in office with reluctant support from the Reform Party, which feared that a collapse of government (and thus a general election) would see large gains for Labour. Later the same year, formal coalition talks took place between United, Reform, and Labour, with a "unity government" proposed to counter the depression. Labour eventually walked out of the talks, but Reform leader Gordon Coates (pressed by Downie Stewart) eventually agreed to form a coalition between United and Reform. Forbes, backed by dissident members of Reform, won the leadership of the coalition government, but Downie Stewart of Reform became the Minister of Finance.

In the 1931 elections, the coalition worked in close co-operation and won fifty-one out of the eighty seats. United and Reform between them had held a few more seats before, but their combined tally exceeded what many had anticipated in light of the economic conditions. The government did not exhibit great stability, however — particularly strong tensions arose between Coates and Downie Stewart, who clashed over the best response to the country's economic problems. Coates eventually won, and Stewart resigned. Coates, as the new Minister of Finance, became increasingly powerful, and the weary Forbes did not strongly oppose Coates's influence; while Forbes remained Prime Minister, Coates effectively led the government. The economic situation persisted.

In the 1935 elections, United and Reform maintained their coalition. Anger at the country's ongoing economic problems remained high, however, and many saw Forbes and Coates as jointly responsible for the situation. In addition, Albert Davy had founded a new "anti-socialist" party, the Democrats, which took votes away from the coalition. Forbes, still the nominal leader of the coalition, appeared tired and apathetic. These factors all added up to a decisive defeat of the coalition, which won only 19 seats–including only seven for United–to Labour's 53. Michael Joseph Savage became New Zealand's first Labour Prime Minister.

== Merger ==
United and Reform maintained their coalition while in opposition. In 1936 they decided to make the coalition permanent and to merge United and Reform into a single party. The new organisation took the name of "the National Party", and – along with Labour – became one of New Zealand's two dominant political parties from that point on.

== Parliamentary Leaders ==
Key:
United Reform Labour
PM: Prime Minister LO: Leader of the Opposition

No.	Leader	Portrait	Term		Position	Prime Minister
1	Joseph Ward		17 September 1928	21 May 1930	LO 1928	Coates
1	Joseph Ward		17 September 1928	21 May 1930	PM 1928–1930	Ward
2	George Forbes		21 May 1930	May 1936	PM 1930–1935	Forbes
2	George Forbes		21 May 1930	May 1936	LO 1935–1936	Savage
United Party merged into National Party 1936.

=== Electoral results ===
Election	# of votes	% of vote	# of seats won	Government
1928	225,042	29.75	27 / 80	Coalition with Labour then Reform
1931	120,801	16.90	19 / 80	Coalition with Reform
1935	285,422†	33.48†	7 / 80	Opposition

†Total Coalition vote.
