= 1898 Mataura by-election =

New Zealand by-election

- 26 May 1898
- Turnout: 3,401
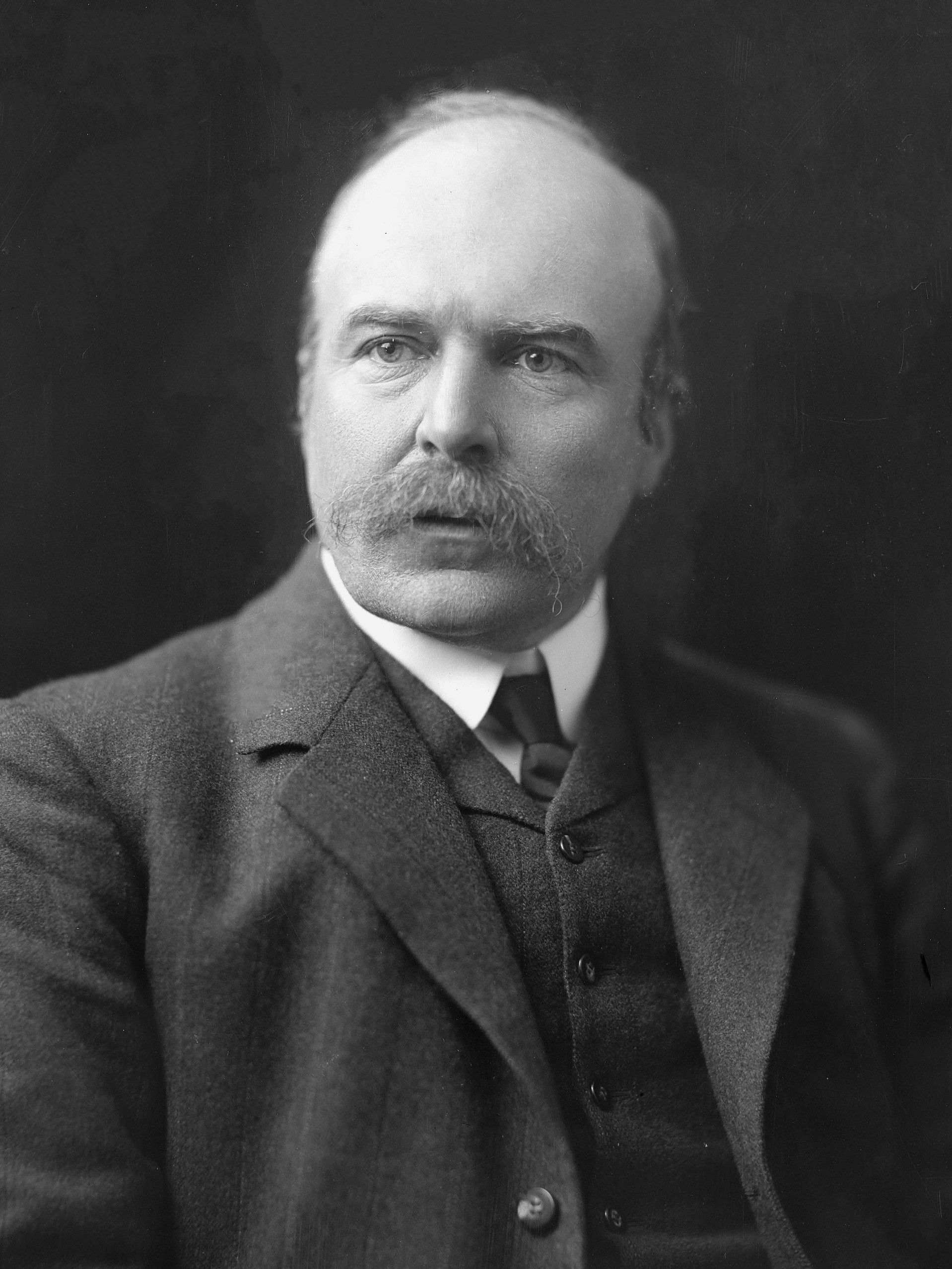

Candidate	Robert McNab	Wilfrid Ward
Party	Liberal	Independent
Popular vote	1,894	1,507
MP before election
George Richardson
Independent
Elected MP
Robert McNab
Liberal

The Mataura by-election, 1898 was a by-election held on 26 May 1898 during the 13th New Zealand Parliament in the rural lower South Island electorate of Mataura.

== Background ==
The by-election was triggered after sitting Member George Richardson was declared bankrupt. Robert McNab stated that had Richardson contested the election, he would not have accepted a nomination and allowed him to return unopposed. McNab had previously represented the Mataura electorate from 1893 to 1896 when he was defeated by Richardson.

== Results ==
The following table gives the election results:

1898 Mataura by-election
Party	Candidate	Votes	%	±%
Liberal	Robert McNab	1,894	55.68	
Independent	Wilfrid Francis Ward	1,507	44.31	
Majority		387	11.37	
Turnout		3,401		

After winning the contest, McNab held the seat uninterrupted until 1908 when he was defeated.
