= Walter Russell (disambiguation) =

Walter Russell (1871–1963) was an American impressionist painter, sculptor, and author.

Walter Russell may also refer to:

- Walter Russell III, treble, Grammy award recipient for Fire Shut Up in My Bones
- Walter B. Russell Jr. (1929–2016), American politician
- Walter Westley Russell (1867–1949), British painter
- Wally Russell (Walter Ivan Russell, 1923–1981), Australian rules footballer

== See also ==
- Gerald Walter Russell (1850–1928), Royal Navy admiral
