= Ethel Richardson =

New Zealand artist biography

- Born: Mary Ethel Richardson; 7 October 1869; Blenheim, New Zealand
- Died: 16 February 1946 (aged 76)
- Other name: Ethel Richardson
- Father: George Richardson

Mary Ethel Richardson (7 October 1869 – 16 February 1946) was a New Zealand artist, draughtswoman, and illustrator. She is known for her trip with her sisters Fanny Eva Richardson and Lillie Augusta Knox (nee Richardson) to the sub-Antarctic islands on government steamship SS Hinemoa in 1890. She went by her middle name and was primarily known as Ethel.

== Life ==
Richardson was born on 7 October 1869 in Blenheim, New Zealand. She and her family later moved to Wellington to live with her father, George Richardson, who was Minister of Lands between 1887–1891. Her mother, Augusta Marie Isabelle Paterson White, also known as Lillie Richardson, was the granddaughter of a British Admiral. Ethel had two sisters, Fanny Eva Richardson and Lillie Augusta Knox, and two brothers, one of whom was Harry McKellar White Richardson, who served in the New Zealand Army as a lieutenant colonel.

Later in life, she lived at Waiho Gorge in Westland to be near a married man she admired.

Richardson died on 16 February 1946. The majority of her money and assets went to her sister, Fanny, and her nieces and nephews.

=== SS Hinemoa trip to sub-Antarctic islands ===
Richardson is most known for a trip taken with her sisters Lillie and Fanny on government steamship SS Hinemoa in 1890, the purpose of which was to service lighthouses and sub-Antarctic castaway depots and survey natural history on the Auckland, Campbell, Antipodes, and Bounty Islands. They departed on 26 September. During this trip, Richardson produced an illustrated log and collected specimens of insects and plants, some of which are held at Te Papa Tongarewa Museum of New Zealand. She also collected pressed flowers, leaves, and hair in her diary.

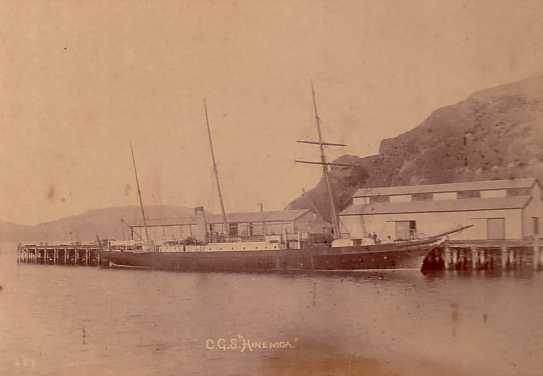
Black and white photograph of the SS Hinemoa

Richardson and her sisters were adventurous and had already made trips around the North Island. The sisters had asked to join the trip around the sub-Antarctic islands. Captain John Fairchild was acquainted with the sisters' father. A New Zealand Herald article from April 1890 stated "It is a well-known fact that passengers are allowed to travel by the Hinemoa on payment of a nominal sum for victualling. The persons favoured are usually friends of some Government official, who is thus enabled to oblige them".

Lillie Richardson married Andrew Knox, one of the carpenters aboard Hinemoa during their trip. Knox is mentioned in Richardson's diary.

=== Career and works ===
One of Richardson's illustrations for The Maori by Eldson Best.

Richardson's work was exhibited at the New Zealand Academy of Fine Arts between 1919–1932, the Auckland Society of Arts, the Canterbury Society of Arts, and Otago Art Society. She also exhibited a painting titled Dying Beach, Indeavour Inlet at the New Zealand and South Seas Exhibition in Dunedin in 1925–1926. She also illustrated a book, The Maori (1924), by New Zealand historian and ethnologist Eldson Best. Fanny Richardson was also an artist and also exhibited at the New Zealand Academy of Fine Arts with her sister. She also kept a sketchbook during the Hinemoa journey.

Ehtel Richardson was a draughtswoman for the Department of Lands and Survey.

She also made money selling her paintings at the Hermitage Hotel, Mount Cook Village. Some of her landscape acrylic and oil paintings have since been sold at auction in New Zealand and in Australia.

== Legacy ==
The diary and sketchbook Richardson kept whilst travelling with the Hinemoa was published in 2014 by Phantom House Books by her great-niece Cynthia Cass, grand-daughter of Lillie Knox. It is titled We Three Go South: The 1890 diary of Ethel Richardson's trip to the Sub-Antarctic. The New Zealand Maritime Museum commissioned New Zealand artist May Trubuhovich to create an artwork based on the published diary in 2021. She created a table runner using hand embroidery and acrylic ink.
