= Admiral Russell =

Admiral Russell may refer to:

- Edward Russell, 1st Earl of Orford (1653–1727), British Royal Navy admiral
- Gerald Walter Russell (1850–1928), British Royal Navy admiral
- Guy Russell (1898–1977), British Royal Navy admiral
- James Sargent Russell (1903–1996), U.S. Navy admiral
- John Henry Russell (1827–1897), U.S. Navy rear admiral
- John Russell, 1st Earl of Bedford (c. 1485–1555), English Lord High Admiral
- Lord Edward Russell (1805–1887), British Royal Navy admiral
- Thomas Macnamara Russell (died 1824), British Royal Navy admiral
