= Andrew Russell (New Zealand politician) =

Member of the New Zealand Legislative Council
- In office 1861–1872

Ministry of Native Affairs
- In office 1865–1866
- Military career
- Born: 27 September 1811; At sea
- Died: 20 July 1900 (aged 88); Fonthill, Torquay, Devon
- Burial place: Torquay Cemetery, Devon
- Spouse: Eliza Ann Howlett (m. 1835)
- Relatives: William Russell Russell (son); Gerald Walter Russell (son); Andrew Hamilton Russell (grandson)
- Allegiance: United Kingdom
- Branch: (United Kingdom of Great Britain and Ireland) British Army
- Service years: 1828–1859
- Rank: Brevet Lieutenant Colonel
- Units: 22nd Regiment, 1828– 58th Regiment, 1842–1859
- Commands: Superintendent of Military Roads, Wellington district
- Campaigns: Anglo–Sindh War, 1843; New Zealand Wars; Hutt Valley

Lieutenant-Colonel Andrew Hamilton Russell (1811–1900) was a British Army officer. He was appointed to the New Zealand Legislative Council from 1861 to 1872, and was Minister of Native Affairs (as the Minister of Māori Affairs was then called) from 1865 to 1866 in the Stafford Ministry.

Russell was commissioned into the 22nd (Cheshire) Regiment of Foot in 1828. He was promoted Lieutenant in 1834 and Captain in 1841. In 1842 he transferred to the 58th (Rutlandshire) Regiment of Foot.

He served in New Zealand from 1845, and as Captain of the 58th and "Superintendent, Military Roads" was responsible for construction of the Old Porirua Road north from Wellington, where a steep section north of Johnsonville was known as "Russell's Folly". He was promoted Major in 1854 and retired as a Brevet Lieutenant-Colonel in 1859. He then settled as a farmer on Mangakuri (sheep) Station in Hawke's Bay. He sold the farm and returned to England in 1874, dying there on 20 July 1900.

His elder son, again named Andrew Hamilton Russell, was the father of Major-General Sir Andrew Hamilton Russell, who commanded the New Zealand Division during the First World War.

His younger son William Russell was a prominent politician and Leader of the Opposition.
