= Hugh Campbell (New Zealand politician) =

New Zealand politician (1875–1951)

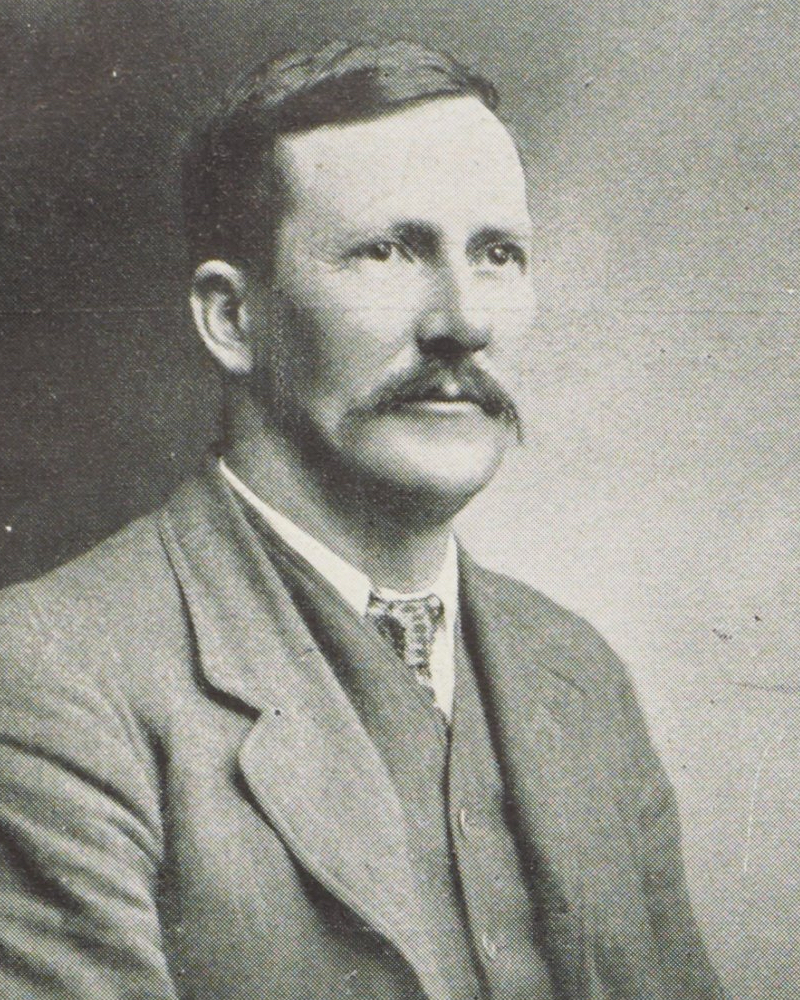
Hugh Campbell

Hugh McLean Campbell (21 March 1875 – 22 May 1951), sometimes known as HM Campbell, was a Reform Party Member of Parliament in New Zealand.

== Biography ==
New Zealand Parliament
Years	Term	Electorate	Party
1911–1914	18th	Hawkes Bay	Reform
1919–1922	20th	Hawkes Bay	Reform
1925–1928	22nd	Hawkes Bay	Reform
1928–1931	23rd	Hawkes Bay	Reform
1931–1935	24th	Hawkes Bay	Reform

Campbell was born in Te Aute near Pukehou in the Hawke's Bay. His father, Hugh Campbell, was a sheep farmer in Australia, then in Wānaka, and finally in Poukawa south of Hastings. His mother, Margaret Gardiner, died when he was only three years old. He was brought up by his elder sister, Catherine, and Mary Williams, the wife of their neighbour, the missionary Samuel Williams.

On 31 January 1900, he married Mildred Rachel Ralston at Carnarvon in the Manawatu. They had three sons and one daughter.

Campbell founded the Hawke's Bay Tribune in 1910 with his brother-in-law, John Chambers, and George Nelson. They encouraged him to become politically active and replace the conservative politician Sir William Russell, who had retired from the Hawke's Bay electorate at the 1905 election.

Campbell first stood in the Hawke's Bay electorate in the 1911 election and defeated the Liberal candidate in the second ballot. He became a member of the Reform Party. Several newspaper reports in late 1912 say he contracted influenza which developed into typhoid.

He was defeated in 1914, re-elected in 1919 and retired in 1922 due to ill-health. He was re-elected in 1925, and defeated in 1935 in the strong swing towards the Labour Party.

In 1935, he was awarded the King George V Silver Jubilee Medal. He was chairman of the board of directors of The Dominion newspaper from 1934 to 1950.

Campbell died on his farm on 22 May 1951. His wife had died in 1947. They were survived by their children.

== Notes ==
New Zealand Parliament
Preceded by Alfred Dillon	Member of Parliament for Hawkes Bay; 1911–1914; 1919–1922; 1925–1935	Succeeded by Robert McNab
Preceded by John Findlay	Member of Parliament for Hawkes Bay; 1911–1914; 1919–1922; 1925–1935	Succeeded by Gilbert McKay
Preceded by Gilbert McKay	Member of Parliament for Hawkes Bay; 1911–1914; 1919–1922; 1925–1935	Succeeded by Ted Cullen
