= Attorney General Finlay =

Attorney General Finlay may refer to:

- John Findlay (New Zealand politician) (1862–1929), Attorney-General of New Zealand
- Martyn Finlay (1912–1999), Attorney-General of New Zealand
- Robert Finlay, 1st Viscount Finlay (1842–1929), Attorney General for England and Wales
