= Francis Wallace Mackenzie =

New Zealand politician (1824–1892)

New Zealand Parliament
Years	Term	Electorate	Party
1881–1884	8th	Mataura	Independent

Francis Wallace Mackenzie (1824 – 5 December 1892) was a 19th-century Member of Parliament from Otago, New Zealand.

Mackenzie was born in Ross-shire, Scotland, in 1824. Aged 16, he sailed to India with the East India Company. He left just before the Indian Rebellion of 1857 and bought land at the Pomahaka River in Otago, New Zealand. There, he set up his farm 'Glenkenich', and the locality, near Tapanui, is now known as Pomahaka. Mackenzie served as a member of the Otago Provincial Council.

He represented the Mataura electorate from 1881 to 1884, when he was defeated. At the 1887 election Mackenzie stood in the Waikaia electorate, and was initially declared the winner with a one-vote majority. However, a recount resulted in the result being reversed, with Hugh Valentine being elected.

Mackenzie died at his home, Glenkenich Station, on 5 December 1892.

New Zealand Parliament
Preceded by James Shanks	Member of Parliament for Mataura; 1881–1884	Succeeded by George Richardson
