= Gerald Walter Russell =

Royal Navy Admiral (1850–1928)

Admiral Gerald Walter Russell
- Born: 17 January 1850; Wellington, New Zealand
- Died: 7 November 1928 (aged 78); Haslemere, Surrey
- Military career
- Allegiance: United Kingdom
- Branch: Royal Navy
- Rank: Admiral
- Commands: HMS Hannibal; Pembroke Dockyard

Admiral Gerald Walter Russell (17 January 1850 – 7 November 1928) was a Royal Navy officer who was Captain-Superintendent of Pembroke Dockyard throughout 1902–1904.

== Background and family ==
Russell was born in Wellington, New Zealand in 1850, the son of Lieutenant-Colonel Andrew Russell (1811–1900) by Elizabeth Ann Howlett (1815–1891). His father was a British army officer who served in New Zealand at the time of his birth, and was later a politician in the colony before moving back to the United Kingdom in 1874. Among his brothers were Sir William Russell Russell (1838–1913); while Major-General Sir Andrew Hamilton Russell (1868–1960) was son of another brother, Andrew Hamilton Russell (1837–1916).

== Naval career ==
Russell entered the Royal Navy, and was promoted to lieutenant on 13 March 1873 (with seniority from 19 January) while serving on the China Station, confirming a commission given by Vice-Admiral Charles Shadwell, Commander-in-Chief on the China Station, following the death of another officer. He was promoted to commander on 31 December 1883, and was appointed in command of the surveying ship HMS Hearty in 1890. He was promoted to the rank of captain on 30 June 1892, and saw successive commands of HMS Sybille and HMS Rodney. In April 1900, he was appointed in command of the pre-dreadnought battleship HMS Hannibal, serving in the Channel Fleet. During his command, the ship was among the huge fleet of ships present in the Solent for the passage of the body of Queen Victoria from Cowes to Portsmouth on 2 February 1901.

On 1 October 1902, Russell was appointed Captain-Superintendent, Pembroke Dockyard, in which post he maintained for two years, until he was promoted to flag rank as rear-admiral on 1 September 1904. He was placed on the Retired List at his own request on 1 March 1908, and was promoted to the rank of vice-admiral (on the Retired List) on 2 July 1908, and to admiral on 30 July 1912.

He died in Haslemere, Surrey, on 7 November 1928.

== Personal life ==
Russell married on 4 July 1893 Katherine Yatman (March 1863 – 2 August 1950), daughter of Herbert George Yatman. There were three children. While they were stationed at Pembroke dockyard, Mrs. Russell laid the keel plates of the armoured cruiser HMS Duke of Edinburgh on 11 February 1903.

Military offices
| Preceded by Captain Charles James Barlow | Captain-Superintendent, Pembroke Dockyard; 1902–1904 | Succeeded by Captain John Denison |
