= James Shanks (New Zealand politician) =

New Zealand politician

New Zealand Parliament
Years	Term	Electorate	Party
1879	6th	Mataura	Independent
1879–1881	7th	Mataura	Independent

James Steuart Shanks (his middle name was often spelled Stewart; March 1835 – 13 October 1911) was a 19th-century Member of Parliament from the Southland region, New Zealand.

Shanks was born in Glasgow in March 1835. His father was James Steuart Shanks Sen. (1800–1871); he died at Tuturau. His Dublin-born mother (1814–1898) died at Mataura. The family emigrated to New Zealand and arrived in Dunedin on 20 November 1849 on the Kelso when he was aged 14. He initially worked in Balclutha and then Clinton as a sawmiller and felling trees. He was then employed as a survey assistant around Wallacetown. Together with his father and eldest brother, he purchased the Marairua Run (then known as the Tuturau Run) in 1857. The Shanks held the run until 1878, when they subdivided it. He then moved to Mataura to become an auctioneer.

Shanks was chairman of the Tuturau Road Board for some years. He was also a member of the Southland County Council, including its chairman. He was a member of the Southland Education Board. Following the resignation of William Wood from parliament, Shanks stood in the January 1879 Mataura by-election and defeated Andrew Kinross. In the 1879 general election later that year, he was returned unopposed. He represented the Mataura electorate until the 1881 election, when he retired.

In 1861, he married Jessie MacGibbon. Five of their eight children received their education at Tuturau Public School. Shanks died on 13 October 1911 at Mataura, and he was buried at Mataura Cemetery. His wife died in 1920.

New Zealand Parliament
Preceded by William Wood	Member of Parliament for Mataura; 1879–1881	Succeeded by Francis Wallace Mackenzie
