= Mataura (electorate) =

Mataura was a parliamentary electorate in the Southland Region of New Zealand, from 1866 to 1946.

== Population centres ==
In the 1865 electoral redistribution, the House of Representatives focussed its review of electorates to South Island electorates only, as the Central Otago gold rush had caused significant population growth, and a redistribution of the existing population. Fifteen additional South Island electorates were created, including Mataura, and the number of Members of Parliament was increased by 13 to 70.

Mataura was located in the rural Southland Region. It covered the area around Invercargill (which had its own urban electorate) and settlements included Bluff, Winton, Gore, Mataura, and Edendale.

== History ==
Mataura was first established for the 1866 general election. The first representative was Dillon Bell from 1866 until when he retired from politics at the dissolution of parliament in December 1875. Bell was succeeded by William Wood, who won the 1876 election. Wood resigned at the end of 1878, as he had been appointed to the Legislative Council.

Woods resignation caused the 1879 by-election, which was won by James Shanks; he retired at the end of the parliamentary term in 1881. Shanks was succeeded by Francis Wallace Mackenzie, who won the 1881 election, but who was defeated in 1884 by George Richardson. In the 1893 election, Richardson was defeated by Robert McNab of the Liberal Party, but Richardson in turn defeated McNab in the 1896 election. In 1898, Richardson was declared bankrupt, and the resulting 1898 by-election was won by McNab, who served until he was defeated again in the 1908 election.

=== Members of Parliament ===
The electorate was represented by nine Members of Parliament:

Key

Independent Conservative Liberal Reform United National

Election	Winner
1866 election	Dillon Bell
1871 election	Dillon Bell
1876 election	William Wood
1879 by-election	James Shanks
1879 election	James Shanks
1881 election	Francis Wallace Mackenzie
1884 election	George Richardson
1887 election	George Richardson
1890 election	George Richardson
1893 election	Robert McNab
1896 election	George Richardson (2nd period)
1898 by-election	Robert McNab (2nd period)
1899 election	Robert McNab (2nd period)
1902 election	Robert McNab (2nd period)
1905 election	Robert McNab (2nd period)
1908 election	George Anderson
1911 election	George Anderson
1914 election	George Anderson
1919 election	George Anderson
1922 election	George Anderson
1925 election	George Anderson
1928 election	David McDougall
1931 election	David McDougall
1935 election	David McDougall
1938 election	Tom Macdonald
1943 election	Tom Macdonald
(Electorate abolished 1946; see Wallace)

== Election results ==
=== 1931 election ===
1931 general election: Mataura
Party	Candidate	Votes	%	±%
United	David McDougall	4,254	56.23	
Independent	Thomas Golden	3,311	43.77	
Majority		943	12.47	
Informal votes		129	1.68	
Turnout		7,694	83.47	
Registered electors		9,218		

=== 1928 election ===
1928 general election: Mataura
Party	Candidate	Votes	%	±%
United	David McDougall	4,175	50.37	
Reform	George James Anderson	4,113	49.63	
Majority		62	0.75	
Informal votes		48	0.58	
Turnout		8,336	90.67	
Registered electors		9,194		

=== 1919 election ===
1919 general election: Mataura
Party	Candidate	Votes	%	±%
Reform	George James Anderson	3,042	52.66	
Independent Liberal	David McDougall	1,706	29.53	
Labour	W. Alexander McLachlan	848	14.68	
Independent Labour	Norman McIntyre	181	3.13	
Majority		1,336	23.13	
Informal votes		50	0.86	
Turnout		5,827	81.81	
Registered electors		7,123		

=== 1899 election ===
1899 general election: Mataura
Party	Candidate	Votes	%	±%
Liberal	Robert McNab	2,132	51.94	−3.74
Conservative	Irven Willis Raymond	1,973	48.06	
Majority		159	3.87	
Turnout		4,105	79.16	
Registered electors		5,186		

=== 1898 by-election ===
1898 Mataura by-election
Party	Candidate	Votes	%	±%
Liberal	Robert McNab	1,894	55.68	
Independent	Wilfrid Francis Ward	1,507	44.31	
Majority		387	11.37	
Turnout		3,401		

=== 1890 election ===
1890 general election: Matarua
Party	Candidate	Votes	%	±%
Conservative	George Richardson	836	53.97	
Liberal	John Gideon Fraser	713	46.03	
Majority		123	7.94	
Turnout		1,549	2566	
Registered electors		2,566		

=== 1871 election ===
1871 general election: Mataura
Party	Candidate	Votes	%	±%
Independent	Dillon Bell	235	62.17	
Independent	Andrew Kinross	73	19.31	
Independent	Thomas Denniston	70	18.52	
Majority		162	42.86	
Turnout		378	49.28	
Registered electors		767		
