= 1879 Mataura by-election =

New Zealand by-election

The 1879 Mataura by-election was a by-election held on 15 January 1879 during the 6th New Zealand Parliament in the electorate of Mataura in Southland.

The by-election was caused by the resignation of the incumbent MP William Wood on 10 December 1878.

The by-election was won by James Shanks.

Both Shanks and Kinross were described as "Greyites" or Government supporters, though Shank's views were said to be much more moderate than those of Kinross.

== Results ==
The following table gives the election result:

1879 Mataura by-election
Party	Candidate	Votes	%	±%
Independent	James Shanks	309	55.28	
Independent	Andrew Kinross	250	44.72	
Majority		59	10.55	
Turnout		559		
