= George James Anderson =

New Zealand politician

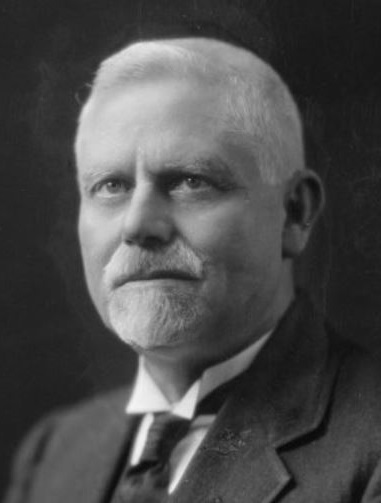
Anderson in 1922

George James Anderson (1860 – 15 December 1935) was a Reform Party Member of Parliament, and a minister in the Reform Government from 1912 to 1928.

== Biography ==
New Zealand Parliament
| Years | Term | Electorate | Party |
|---|---|---|---|
| 1908–1909 | 17th | Mataura | Independent |
| 1909–1911 | Changed allegiance to: | | Reform |
| 1911–1914 | 18th | Mataura | Reform |
| 1914–1919 | 19th | Mataura | Reform |
| 1919–1922 | 20th | Mataura | Reform |
| 1922–1925 | 21st | Mataura | Reform |
| 1925–1928 | 22nd | Mataura | Reform |

He won the Mataura electorate in Southland in the 1908 general election, defeating a government minister Robert McNab on his entry into politics. He held the seat until he was defeated in the 1928 general election.

He was Minister of Internal Affairs (1919–25), and Minister of Labour, Mines and Marine (1919–28).

He was appointed to the Legislative Council in 1934 and served until he died in 1935.

In 1935, he was awarded the King George V Silver Jubilee Medal.

New Zealand Parliament
| Preceded by Robert McNab | Member of Parliament for Mataura; 1908–1928 | Succeeded by David McDougall |
