= Robert McNab =

New Zealand politician (1864–1917)

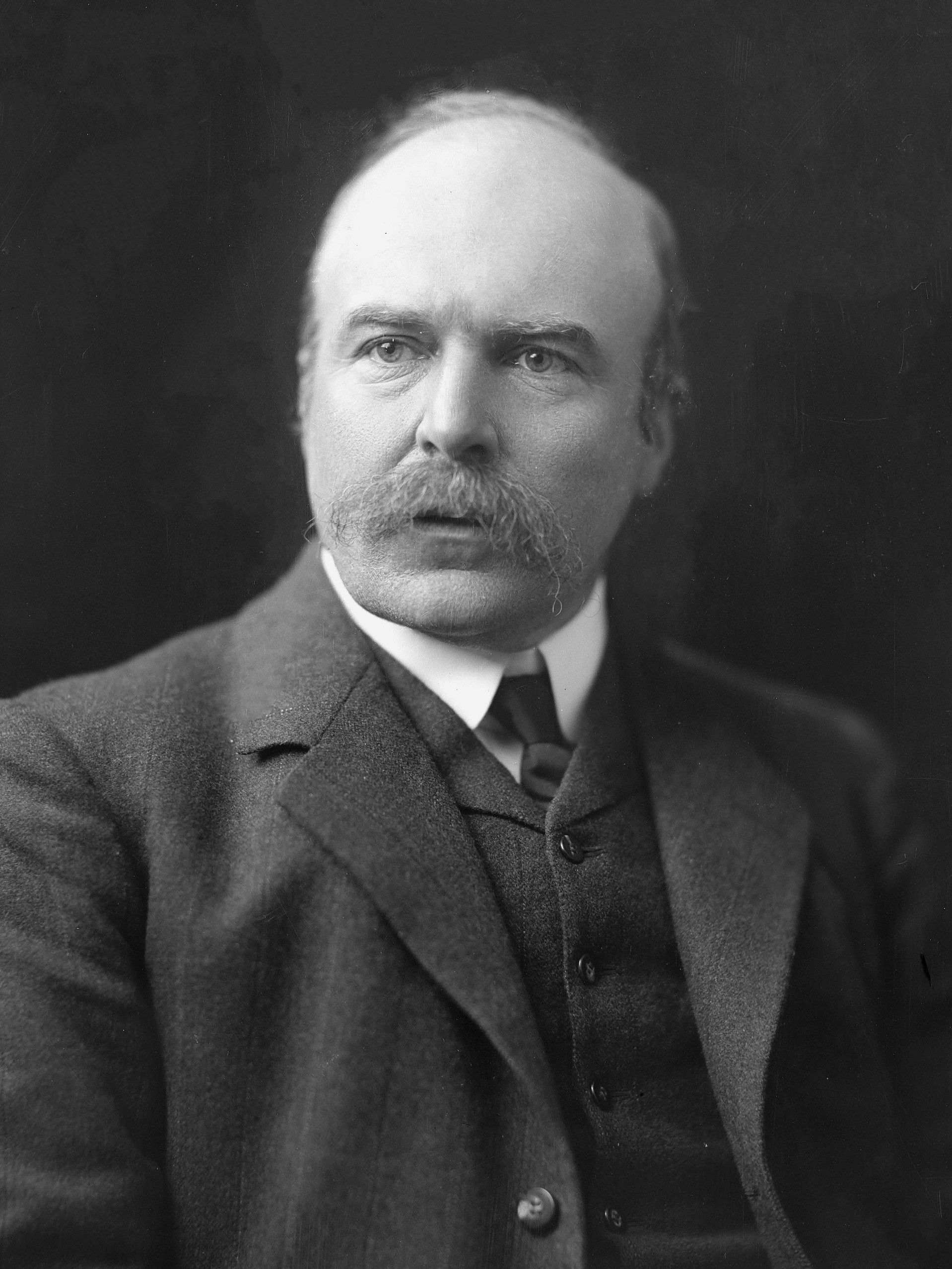
Robert McNab in 1908

Robert McNab (1 October 1864 – 3 February 1917) was a New Zealand lawyer, farmer, historian, and politician of the Liberal Party. He was Minister of Justice for the 18 months before his death.

== Early life ==
McNab was born in 1864 at Dunragget farm near Invercargill. His parents were Janet and Alexander McNab, a runholder. His father represented the Murihiku electorate on the Otago Provincial Council (1858–1861), and the Cambelltown electorate on the Southland Provincial Council (1861–1865), and was for short periods on the Southland Executive Council and the council's Speaker.

Robert McNab received his education from Invercargill District High School and the University of Otago, from where he graduated with a BA in 1893, an MA in mathematics and mathematical physics in 1885, and LLB in 1891. He was admitted to the bar in 1889 and had a law practice in Invercargill from 1890 to 1896, which was followed by running the family farm on the upper Mataura River.

== Political career ==
New Zealand Parliament
Years	Term	Electorate	Party
1893–1896	12th	Mataura	Liberal
1898–1899	13th	Mataura	Liberal
1899–1902	14th	Mataura	Liberal
1902–1905	15th	Mataura	Liberal
1905–1908	16th	Mataura	Liberal
1914–1917	19th	Hawkes Bay	Liberal

He represented the Mataura electorate from 1893 to 1896 when he was defeated by George Richardson. In 1898 Richardson was adjudged bankrupt. McNab won the subsequent by-election, and held the seat again to 1908 when he was again defeated, by George James Anderson. In 1914 he won the Hawkes Bay seat, which he held until he died in 1917.

He was a Cabinet Minister, and was Minister of Lands, and Minister of Agriculture, from 1906 to 1908 in the Ward Ministry. He was Minister of Justice, Minister of Marine, and Minister of Stamp Duties from 1915 to his death in 1917 in the Reform Government when Reform was in a temporary wartime coalition with the Liberals.

== Historical work ==
McNab began researching New Zealand history in the late 1890s, and published numerous articles and books including the Historical Records of New Zealand at the request of the government. In 1913 McNab donated his collection of 4,200 books on history and geography to the Dunedin Public Library, with the condition the collection be added to continually. As of 2008, the McNab New Zealand Collection contains around 83,000 items.

== Death ==
McNab, who never married, died in Wellington on 3 February 1917. He was buried in Invercargill.

== Notes ==
Political offices
Preceded by Alexander Herdman	Minister of Justice; 1915–1917	Succeeded by Josiah Hanan
New Zealand Parliament
Preceded by George Richardson	Member of Parliament for Mataura; 1893–1896; 1898–1908	Succeeded by George Richardson
Preceded by George Richardson	Member of Parliament for Mataura; 1893–1896; 1898–1908	Succeeded by George James Anderson
Preceded by Hugh Campbell	Member of Parliament for Hawkes Bay; 1914–1917	Succeeded by John Findlay
