= James Lloyd Findlay =

New Zealand soldier

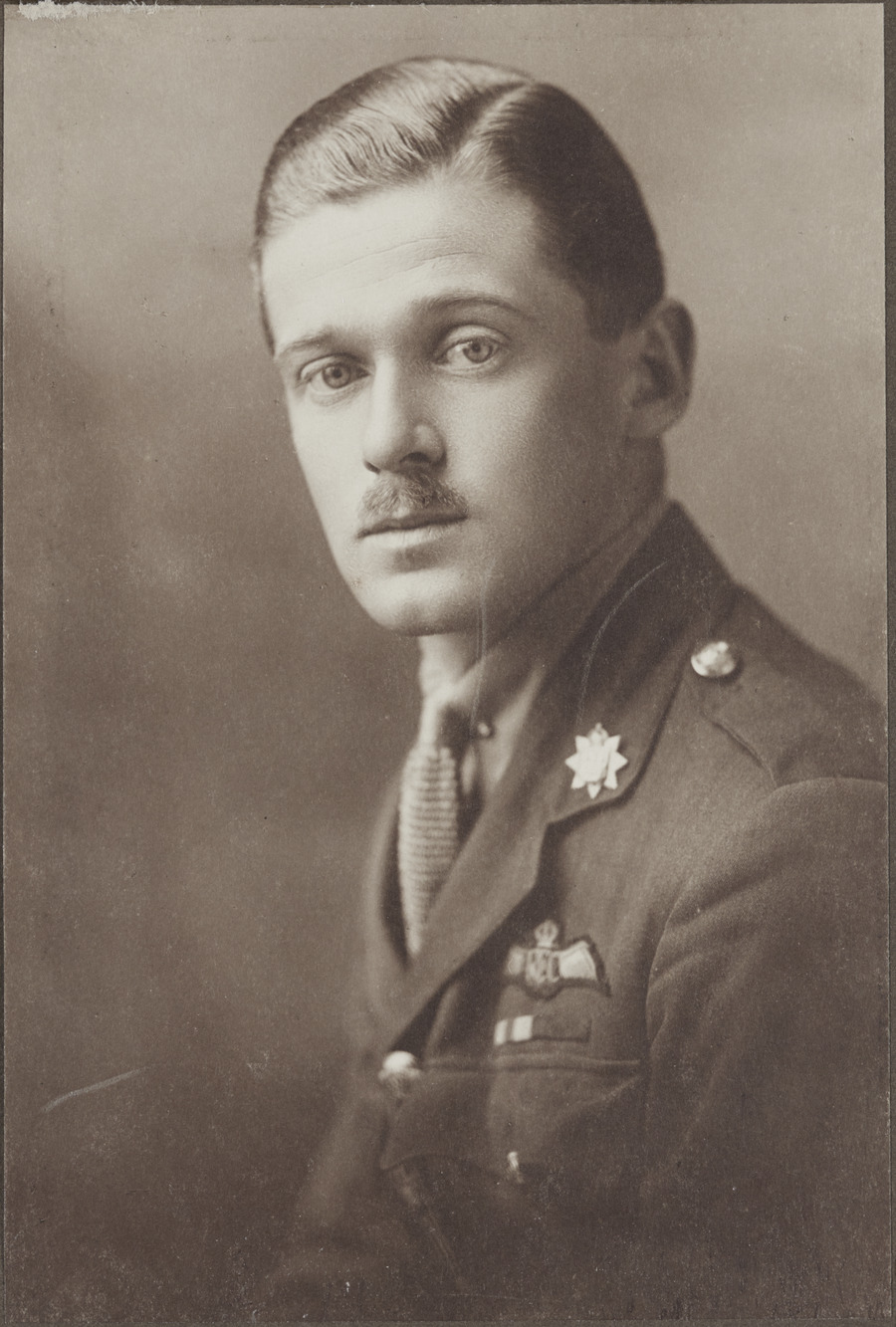
- Born: 6 October 1895; Wellington, New Zealand
- Died: 17 March 1983 (aged 87); Richmond, Surrey, England
- Relatives: Sir John Findlay (father); Wilfred Findlay (brother)
- Military career
- Allegiance: United Kingdom; New Zealand
- Branch: British Army (1914–1918); Royal Air Force (1918–1921); Royal New Zealand Air Force (1923–1954)
- Service years: 1914–1921; 1923–1954
- Rank: Air Commodore
- Unit: East Surrey Regiment
- Commands: RNZAF Central Command; RAF Hooton Park; No. 48 Squadron RAF; RNZAF Base Wigram
- Conflicts: First World War; Battle of Loos; Battle of the Somme; Second World War
- Awards: Commander of the Order of the British Empire; Military Cross; Mentioned in Despatches; Chevalier of the Legion of Honour (France); Legion of Merit (United States)
- Cricket career

Cricket information
- Batting: Right-handed
- Bowling: Slow left-arm orthodox

Domestic team information
- Years: Team
- 1925/26: Canterbury

Career statistics
Competition	First-class
Matches	3
Runs scored	30
Batting average	30.00
100s/50s	0/0
Top score	9*
Balls bowled	775
Wickets	9
Bowling average	36.55
5 wickets in innings	0
10 wickets in match	0
Best bowling	4-54
Catches/stumpings	0/0
- Source: ESPN Cricinfo, 12 October 2021

Air Commodore James Lloyd Findlay CBE, MC (6 October 1895 – 17 March 1983) was a New Zealand soldier and air force officer who served in both World Wars.

== Early life and family ==
Findlay was born in Wellington, New Zealand in 1895, the second son of Sir John Findlay, and was educated at Wellington College.

== First World War ==
Findlay had been studying in England at the outbreak of the First World War and was commissioned as an officer in the East Surrey Regiment. He distinguished himself during the Battle of Loos in September 1915 and the Battle of the Somme in July 1916, and was decorated with the Military Cross and mentioned in despatches. Findlay was also awarded the Croix de Chevalier of the Légion d’honneur by France in recognition of his gallantry. Findlay was wounded during the opening stages of the Battle of the Somme, but after recuperating joined the Royal Flying Corps as a pilot in March 1917.

His brother, Second Lieutenant Ian Calcutt Findlay, 2nd Battalion York and Lancaster Regiment had died of wounds at the 16th Field Ambulance Advanced dressing Station, Belgium on 10 August 1915, aged 18.

Findlay served with the Royal Flying Corps throughout the war, but after transferring to the Royal Air Force on inception in 1918 he was demobilised in August 1921.

== Inter-war period ==
Findlay was married on 17 August 1921 in London to Ruby Violet Finch, youngest daughter of Thomas Alexander Finch of Trinity College, Dublin, after which they both returned to New Zealand.

In June 1923 Findlay was one of the first officers to enlist in the New Zealand Permanent Air Force and commanded Base Wigram from 1926 to 1938.

During his time in Christchurch he played cricket during the 1925–1926 season for Canterbury. He was a right-handed batsman and slow left-arm orthodox bowler.

He was awarded the King George V Silver Jubilee Medal in 1935 and the Coronation Medal in 1937. Findlay was promoted to wing commander in January 1938 and proceeded for attachment to the Royal Air Force as an exchange officer.

== Second World War ==
Attached to the RAF at the beginning of the Second World War he commanded No. 48 Squadron and RAF Hooton Park until recalled to New Zealand. After service at the New Zealand Air Department as Deputy Chief of the Air Staff he was appointed Air Officer Commanding Central Group in September 1942. Findlay was subsequently posted as New Zealand Head of the Joint Staff Mission and RNZAF Representative to Combined Chiefs of Staff, Washington DC, USA. He was appointed a Commander of the Order of the British Empire in the 1944 King's Birthday honours, and for his services in the United States he was awarded the United States Legion of Merit on 7 November 1946.

His son, Ian Thomas Findlay, was a Spitfire pilot killed in action over Yugoslavia on 12 January 1944.

== Post-war ==
Findlay retired as an air commodore in 1954 after 10 years service as New Zealand Air Attaché in Washington DC. He died at Richmond, Surrey, England on 17 Mar 1983.
