= David McDougall =

New Zealand politician

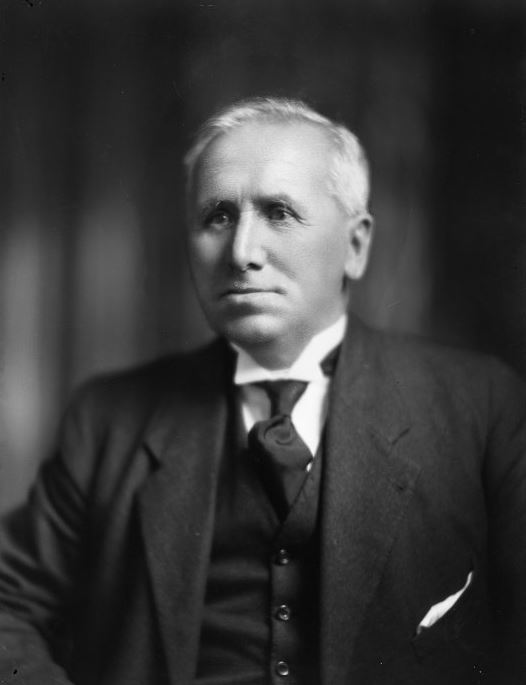
McDougall in 1935.

David (Davie) McDougall (14 July 1858 – 7 November 1943) was a United Party and an independent Member of Parliament for Mataura, in the South Island of New Zealand.

== Biography ==
=== Early life ===
Born in Glasgow, Scotland, McDougall came to New Zealand with his wife in 1884, arriving at Port Chalmers on 11 May on the Aorangi.

=== Political career ===
New Zealand Parliament
Years	Term	Electorate	Party
1928–1931	23rd	Mataura	United
1931–1933	24th	Mataura	United
1933–1935	Changed allegiance to:		Independent
1935–1938	25th	Mataura	Independent

McDougall served on the Gore Borough Council and was Mayor of Gore in 1913, 1915–1919, 1921–1923 and 1927–1928. He unsuccessfully contested the Mataura electorate in the 1919 election as an Independent Liberal, defeated by the incumbent, George James Anderson.

He represented the Mataura electorate in the House of Representatives for ten years from 1928 to 1938, when he was defeated.

In the 1928 and 1931 elections elections, he was elected as a United Party MP. In 1933, he had voted with Labour members in Parliament on a no-confidence motion and was then excluded from the Coalition Government caucus. In the 1935 election McDougall stood as an independent, and was not opposed by Labour. He was successful, and generally voted with Labour. He was defeated in the 1938 election by National's Tom Macdonald.

Davie McDougall was a conspicuous figure in Parliament with his tartan waistcoat and colourful language and behaviour. John A. Lee wrote that McDougall developed a habit of "peppering his talk with humorous asides", which became part of his style as a politician.

Davie McDougall "spoke out for the social and economic progress for the people he represented so well and carved for himself a unique place in New Zealand's political history". He retired to Dunedin, where he died in 1943, survived by 12 of his 13 children.

== Notes ==
New Zealand Parliament
Preceded by George James Anderson	Member of Parliament for Mataura; 1928–1938	Succeeded by Tom Macdonald
