= Wilfred Findlay =

New Zealand cricketer

Personal information
- Full name: John Wilfred Findlay
- Born: 27 November 1891; Wellington, New Zealand
- Died: 1 June 1951 (aged 59); Mount Kisco, New York, United States of America
- Bowling: Right-arm fast
- Relatives: Sir John Findlay (father); James Lloyd Findlay (brother)

Domestic team information
- Years: Team
- 1910/11–1911/12: Wellington

Career statistics
Competition	First-class
Matches	4
Runs scored	51
Batting average	8.50
100s/50s	0/0
Top score	22*
Balls bowled	434
Wickets	13
Bowling average	15.30
5 wickets in innings	0
10 wickets in match	0
Best bowling	4/42
Catches/stumpings	4/–
- Source: Cricinfo, 23 November 2018

John Wilfred Findlay (27 November 1891 – 1 June 1951) was a New Zealand cricketer, soldier and businessman.

== Family ==
Wilfred Findlay was the eldest of three sons of John Findlay, a New Zealand KC and politician who became a Cabinet minister and was knighted in 1911. The second son, James Lloyd Findlay, was an officer who served in both world wars, and the third son, Ian Calcutt Findlay, died on active service in the First World War.

== Cricket career ==
Findlay attended Wellington College, Wellington, where he played in the cricket team. He showed promise in Wellington senior cricket as a fast bowler of genuine pace. He made his first-class debut shortly after he turned 19, and played four matches for Wellington between December 1910 and December 1911, taking 13 wickets at the low average of 15.30 and at a high strike-rate of a wicket every 33 deliveries.

== Later life ==
Family and business commitments took Findlay to England in 1912. He enlisted in the British Army shortly after the outbreak of World War I in 1914 and served throughout the war, first with the King's Royal Rifles and then with the Machine Gun Corps, ending with the rank of major.

On 23 December 1919, in Loughton, Essex, he married Miss Helen Blagden Rich of New York. He was working in insurance in London at the time. He spent most of the rest of his life in Britain and finally the United States, where he was an executive in the insurance industry in New York.
