= Alfred Dillon =

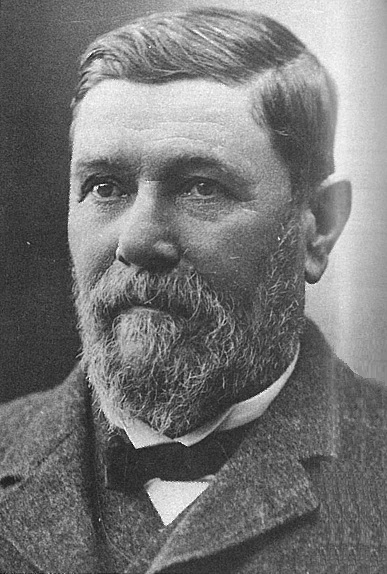

Member of the New Zealand Parliament for Hawkes Bay
- In office 6 December 1905 – 14 December 1911
- Preceded by: William Russell
- Succeeded by: Hugh Campbell

Personal details
- Born: 1841 Wales
- Died: 13 November 1915 (aged 73–74) New Zealand
- Party: Liberal

Alfred Dillon (1841 – 13 November 1915) was a Liberal Party Member of Parliament in New Zealand. Historian David Hamer remarked that Dillon was the prime example of a "Seddonian" Liberal politician, due to humble, rustic background and appeal as a "man of the people".

== Biography ==
=== Early life ===
Dillon was from humble origins in Wales before moving to New Zealand in 1857. There, he worked for years as a farm labourer, bullock driver and carrier before acquiring land; he was a rarity amongst Liberals as a runholder with about 3,500 acres (14 km^{2}). A poor speaker and sneered at by William Russell as illiterate, he appealed as a "man of the people" who had made his way by his own efforts. He retained the image of the rugged pioneer; short, barrel-chested, bushy-bearded and usually clad in thick country tweeds.

=== Political career ===
New Zealand Parliament
Years	Term	Electorate	Party
1905–1908	16th	Hawkes Bay	Liberal
1908–1911	17th	Hawkes Bay	Liberal

Dillon won the Hawkes Bay electorate in 1905, beating the oligarchical Leader of the Opposition William Russell, but was defeated six years later in 1911. He was 64 years old when he entered Parliament and was known affectionately as "Dad" by other Liberal members.

== Notes ==
New Zealand Parliament
Preceded by William Russell	Member of Parliament for Hawkes Bay; 1905–1911	Succeeded by Hugh Campbell
