= John Tinsley Russell =

New Zealand WWII army officer

John Tinsley Russell DSO
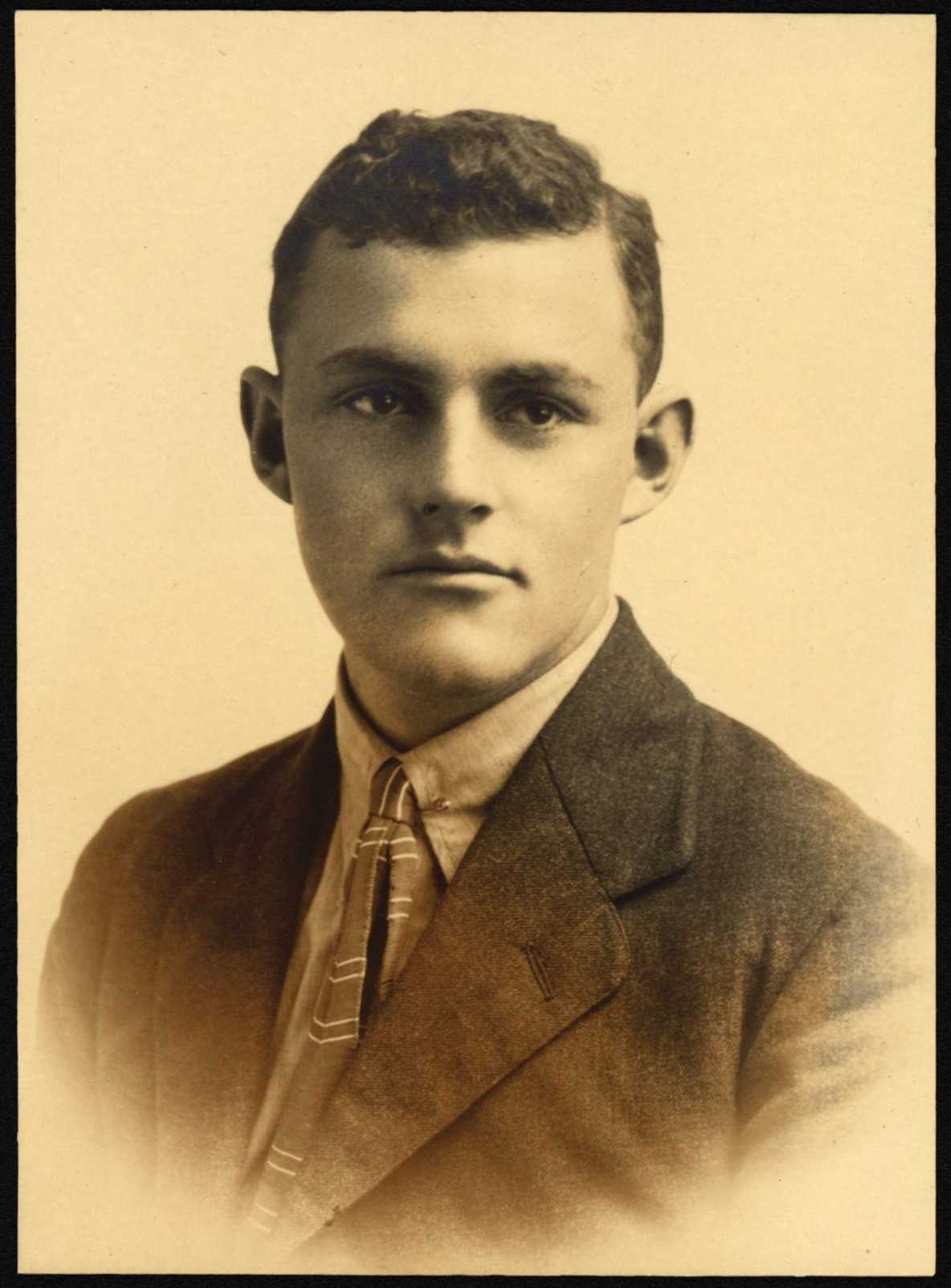
- Born: 11 November 1904; Hastings, New Zealand
- Died: 6 September 1942 (aged 37); Egypt
- Resting place: Alamein Memorial
- Occupation: Farmer
- Spouse: Rosamund Russell (nee Rolleston)
- Parents: Andrew Hamilton Russell (father); Gertrude Russell (mother)

John Tinsley Russell DSO (11 November 1904 – 6 September 1942) was an officer in the 2nd New Zealand Expeditionary Force during the Second World War. He was second in command of the New Zealand Divisional Cavalry, and was awarded the Distinguished Service Order. He later commanded the 22nd Battalion until he was killed in action in Egypt in September 1942.

He was the son of Andrew Hamilton Russell, notable for his leadership of the New Zealand Division during the First World War.

== Military Decorations ==
- Distinguished Service Order - awarded 26 December 1941
- 1939-1945 Star
- Africa Star
- New Zealand War Service Medal
