= Hawkes Bay (electorate) =

Hawke's Bay was a parliamentary electorate in the Hawke's Bay Region of New Zealand from 1881 to 1996. In 1986 it was renamed Hawkes Bay (without an apostrophe).

== Population centres ==
The previous electoral redistribution was undertaken in 1875 for the 1875–1876 election. In the six years since, New Zealand's European population had increased by 65%. In the 1881 electoral redistribution, the House of Representatives increased the number of European representatives to 91 (up from 84 since the 1875–76 election). The number of Māori electorates was held at four. The House further decided that electorates should not have more than one representative, which led to 35 new electorates being formed, including Hawke's Bay, and two electorates that had previously been abolished to be recreated. This necessitated a major disruption to existing boundaries.

Prior to the 1881 electoral redistribution, the Napier electorate covered not just the town of Napier, but also its rural hinterland. The northern boundary was the 39th latitude, the arbitrary line established in 1853 that formed the boundary between the original Wellington and Auckland Provinces. In 1881, this arbitrary boundary line was abolished, and the East Coast electorate came across this line to the south. Inland, the Hawke's Bay electorate went across the line to the north and took up most of the rural part of the former Napier electorate, but it also went into the area of the Rangitikei electorate, and the town of Hastings was gained from the Clive electorate, which was abolished and replaced with Waipawa. Other settlements that belonged to the Hawke's Bay electorate in its initial shape were Bay View, Fernhill, and Havelock North.

== History ==
The electorate was represented by twelve Members of Parliament:

The 1996 general election was held early, on 12 October, to avoid the need for a by-election after the resignation of Michael Laws.

=== Members of Parliament ===
Key

Independent Liberal Labour

Conservative Reform National NZ First

| Election | Winner |
|---|---|
| 1881 election | Fred Sutton |
| 1884 election | William Russell |
| 1887 election | William Russell |
| 1890 election | William Russell |
| 1893 election | William Russell |
| 1896 election | William Russell |
| 1899 election | William Russell |
| 1902 election | William Russell |
| 1905 election | Alfred Dillon |
| 1908 election | Alfred Dillon |
| 1911 election | Hugh Campbell |
| 1914 election | Robert McNab |
| 1917 by-election | John Findlay |
| 1919 election | Hugh Campbell (2nd period) |
| 1922 election | Gilbert McKay |
| 1925 election | Hugh Campbell (3rd period) |
| 1928 election | Hugh Campbell (3rd period) |
| 1931 election | Hugh Campbell (3rd period) |
| 1935 election | Ted Cullen |
| 1938 election | Ted Cullen |
| 1943 election | Ted Cullen |
| 1946 election | Cyril Harker |
| 1949 election | Cyril Harker |
| 1951 election | Cyril Harker |
| 1954 election | Cyril Harker |
| 1957 election | Cyril Harker |
| 1960 election | Cyril Harker |
| 1963 election | Richard Harrison |
| 1966 election | Richard Harrison |
| 1969 election | Richard Harrison |
| 1972 election | Richard Harrison |
| 1975 election | Richard Harrison |
| 1978 election | Richard Harrison |
| 1981 election | Richard Harrison |
| 1984 election | Bill Sutton |
| 1987 election | Bill Sutton |
| 1990 election | Michael Laws |
| 1993 election | Michael Laws |
(Electorate abolished in 1996; see Tukituki

== Election results ==
=== 1943 election ===
A general election was initially scheduled for 1941, but this was postponed due to the war. The National Party had selected Robert Douglas Brown as their candidate for the 1941 election; Brown was to later serve as mayor of Hastings.

1943 general election: Hawkes Bay
| Party | Candidate | Votes | % | ±% |
|---|---|---|---|---|
| Labour | Ted Cullen | 6,852 | 54.10 | −6.26 |
| National | Eric Pryor | 5,216 | 41.18 | |
| Democratic Labour | D H Butcher | 273 | 2.15 | |
| Independent | J H Winter | 149 | 1.17 | |
| Informal votes | | 174 | 1.37 | +0.91 |
| Majority | | 1,636 | 12.91 | −8.27 |
| Turnout | | 12,664 | 93.91 | +0.46 |
| Registered electors | | 13,485 | | |

=== 1938 election ===
1938 general election: Hawkes Bay
| Party | Candidate | Votes | % | ±% |
|---|---|---|---|---|
| Labour | Ted Cullen | 7,572 | 60.36 | +5.94 |
| National | George Maddison | 4,911 | 39.15 | |
| Informal votes | | 58 | 0.46 | −0.14 |
| Majority | | 2,658 | 21.18 | +12.35 |
| Turnout | | 12,544 | 93.45 | +4.02 |
| Registered electors | | 13,422 | | |

=== 1935 election ===
1935 general election: Hawkes Bay
| Party | Candidate | Votes | % | ±% |
|---|---|---|---|---|
| Labour | Ted Cullen | 6,222 | 54.42 | +15.73 |
| Reform | Hugh Campbell | 5,212 | 45.58 | −15.73 |
| Informal votes | | 69 | 0.60 | +0.07 |
| Majority | | 1,010 | 8.83 | |
| Turnout | | 11,434 | 89.43 | +9.18 |
| Registered electors | | 12,784 | | |

=== 1931 election ===
1931 general election: Hawke's Bay
| Party | Candidate | Votes | % | ±% |
|---|---|---|---|---|
| Reform | Hugh Campbell | 6,124 | 61.31 | |
| Labour | Ted Cullen | 3,865 | 38.69 | |
| Informal votes | | 53 | 0.53 | |
| Majority | | 2,259 | 22.61 | |
| Turnout | | 10,042 | 80.25 | |
| Registered electors | | 12,514 | | |

=== 1928 election ===
1928 general election: Hawke's Bay
| Party | Candidate | Votes | % | ±% |
|---|---|---|---|---|
| Reform | Hugh Campbell | 3,953 | 38.72 | |
| Labour | Jack Lyon | 3,263 | 31.97 | |
| United | Gilbert McKay | 2,992 | 29.31 | |
| Majority | | 690 | 6.76 | |
| Informal votes | | 92 | 0.89 | |
| Turnout | | 10,300 | 85.55 | |
| Registered electors | | 12,040 | | |

=== 1922 election ===
1922 general election: Hawke's Bay
| Party | Candidate | Votes | % | ±% |
|---|---|---|---|---|
| Liberal | Gilbert McKay | 3,982 | 46.28 | |
| Independent Reform | Andrew Hamilton Russell | 3,665 | 42.60 | |
| Labour | Charles Chapman | 957 | 11.12 | |
| Informal votes | | 105 | 1.21 | |
| Majority | | 317 | 3.68 | |
| Turnout | | 8,709 | 85.58 | |
| Registered electors | | 10,177 | | |

=== 1919 election ===
1919 general election: Hawke's Bay
| Party | Candidate | Votes | % | ±% |
|---|---|---|---|---|
| Reform | Hugh Campbell | 3,234 | 41.99 | |
| Liberal | Gilbert McKay | 2,292 | 29.76 | |
| Labour | Charles Chapman | 2176 | 28.25 | |
| Majority | | 942 | 12.23 | |
| Informal votes | | 86 | 1.10 | |
| Turnout | | 7,788 | 72.96 | |
| Registered electors | | 10,675 | | |

=== 1917 by-election ===
1917 Hawkes Bay by-election
| Party | Candidate | Votes | % | ±% |
|---|---|---|---|---|
| Liberal | Sir John Findlay | 2,635 | 54.24 | |
| Liberal–Labour | H. Ian Simson | 2,164 | 44.54 | |
| Liberal | Alfred Fraser | 9 | 0.18 | |
| Informal votes | | 50 | 1.02 | |
| Majority | | 471 | 9.69 | |
| Turnout | | 4,858 | 48.82 | |
| Registered electors | | 9,950 | | |

=== 1893 election ===
1893 general election: Hawke's Bay
| Party | Candidate | Votes | % | ±% |
|---|---|---|---|---|
| Conservative | William Russell | 1,874 | 40.76 | −25.54 |
| Liberal | Charles William Reardon | 1,804 | 39.23 | +5.53 |
| Liberal | Thomas Tanner | 920 | 20.01 | |
| Majority | | 70 | 1.52 | −31.08 |
| Turnout | | 4,598 | 93.19 | +34.73 |
| Registered electors | | 4,934 | | |

=== 1890 election ===
1890 general election: Hawke's Bay
| Party | Candidate | Votes | % | ±% |
|---|---|---|---|---|
| Conservative | William Russell | 1,340 | 66.30 | |
| Liberal | Charles William Reardon | 681 | 33.70 | |
| Majority | | 659 | 32.60 | |
| Turnout | | 2,021 | 58.46 | |
| Registered electors | | 3,457 | | |
