= John Findlay (New Zealand politician) =

New Zealand politician

The Honourable Sir John Findlay KCMG KC
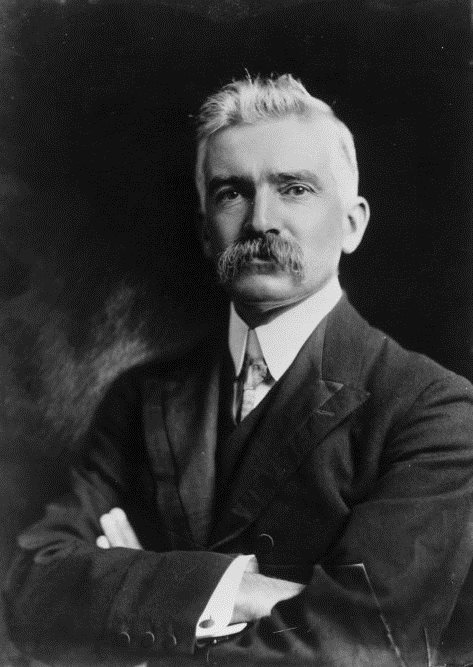

17th Minister of Justice
- In office 6 January 1909 – 26 December 1911
- Prime Minister: Joseph Ward
- Preceded by: James McGowan
- Succeeded by: Josiah Hanan

3rd Minister of Police
- In office 6 January 1909 – 26 December 1911
- Prime Minister: Joseph Ward
- Preceded by: James McGowan
- Succeeded by: Josiah Hanan

10th Attorney-General of New Zealand
- In office 23 November 1906 – 26 December 1911
- Prime Minister: Joseph Ward
- Preceded by: Albert Pitt
- Succeeded by: Alexander Herdman

1st Minister of Internal Affairs
- In office 19 November 1907 – 6 January 1909
- Prime Minister: Joseph Ward
- Preceded by: Office established
- Succeeded by: David Buddo

25th Colonial Secretary of New Zealand
- In office 23 November 1906 – 19 November 1907
- Prime Minister: Joseph Ward
- Governor: The Lord Plunket
- Preceded by: Albert Pitt
- Succeeded by: Office abolished

Member of the New Zealand Parliament for Hawkes Bay
- In office 8 March 1917 – 17 December 1919
- Preceded by: Robert McNab
- Succeeded by: Hugh Campbell

New Zealand Legislative Councillor
- In office 23 November 1906 – 20 November 1911
- Nominated by: Joseph Ward
- Appointed by: The Lord Plunket

Personal details
- Born: John George Findlay; 21 October 1862 Dunedin, New Zealand
- Died: 7 December 1929 (aged 67) Horsted Keynes, East Sussex, England
- Party: Liberal
- Spouse: Josephine Emily Arkle
- Relations: Wilfred Findlay (son); James Findlay (son)

Sir John George Findlay KCMG KC (21 October 1862 – 7 December 1929) was a New Zealand politician of the Liberal Party, and was a Cabinet minister from 1906 to 1911.

== Early life and family ==
Born in Dunedin in 1862, Findlay graduated from the University of Otago with a Bachelor of Laws in 1886 and LLD in 1893. He was admitted to the Bar in 1887 and practised as a lawyer first in Palmerston North and later in Wellington. He was appointed King's Counsel in 1907.

He and his wife Josephine had three sons: Wilfred, James and Ian.

== Political career ==
New Zealand Parliament
Years	Term	Electorate	Party
1917–1919	19th	Hawkes Bay	Liberal

Findlay was one of nine candidates who contested the three-member City of Wellington electorate in the 1902 election; he came sixth with 33.7% of the vote. He was active with the Liberal Party and wrote much of its election manifesto for the 1905 election.

When the Attorney-General, Albert Pitt, died in November 1906, there were no suitable members of the legal profession in Parliament. Hence, Joseph Ward appointed Findlay to the Legislative Council on 23 November 1906, and appointed him Attorney-General and Colonial Secretary on the same day. During his tenure of the latter post, which he held until 6 January 1909, it was renamed to Minister of Internal Affairs.

In the 1911 Coronation Honours, Findlay was appointed a Knight Commander of the Order of St Michael and St George.

He resigned from the Legislative Council on 20 November 1911 in preparation for the 1911 election. Hamer says that he was sent to Auckland and contested the Parnell seat, in an attempt of the Liberals who were facing defeat in 1911 to show that they took Auckland seriously. He lost in the second ballot, with Labour, which had been eliminated on the first ballot split over whether to support Findlay or the Reform candidate James Samuel Dickson.

He represented the Hawkes Bay electorate from 1917 to 1919, when he retired.

He died in Horsted Keynes, East Sussex, England, in 1929.

== Works by John Findlay ==
- Findlay, John George (1897), The degeneration of liberalism in New Zealand, Wellington, [N.Z.]: Evening Post Printing House
- Findlay, John George (1907), The land question: the case for the lease-in-perpetuity settler: a valuable contribution, n.p.: Watkins, Tyer & Tolan Ltd., Printers
- Findlay, John George (1907), The Land Bill: Mr. Massey's criticisms answered, Dunedin, [N.Z.]: Evening Star Co.
- Findlay, John George (1908), Humbugs and homilies, Christchurch, [N.Z.]: Whitcombe & Tombs
- Findlay, John George (1908), Labour and the Arbitration Act: a speech, Wellington, [N.Z.]: New Zealand Times
- Findlay, John George (1909), Our man in the street: the origin, operation and character of public opinion, Dunedin, [N.Z.]: Evening Star Co.
- Findlay, John George (1910), Legal liberty: a lecture delivered by the Hon. Dr. Findlay, Attorney-General of New Zealand, before the Philosophical Society, Palmerston North, on Thursday, 21 April 1910, Wellington, [N.Z.]: New Zealand Times
- Findlay, John George (c. 1910), Travels with a Royal Commission, Wellington, [N.Z.]: New Zealand Times
- Findlay, John George (1912), The Imperial Conference of 1911 from within, London, [England]: Constable & Company Ltd.
- Findlay, John George (1921), "Japanese immigration: a colonial protest", The Whitehall Gazette (March): 10–13

== Notes ==
Political offices
Preceded by Albert Pitt	Attorney-General; 1906–1911	Succeeded by Alexander Herdman
Preceded by James McGowan	Minister of Justice; 1909–1911	Succeeded by Josiah Hanan
Preceded by James McGowan	Minister of Police; 1909–1911	Succeeded by Josiah Hanan
New Zealand Parliament
Preceded by Robert McNab	Member of Parliament for Hawkes Bay; 1917–1919	Succeeded by Hugh Campbell
