= William Russell (New Zealand politician) =

New Zealand politician

The Honourable Sir William Russell
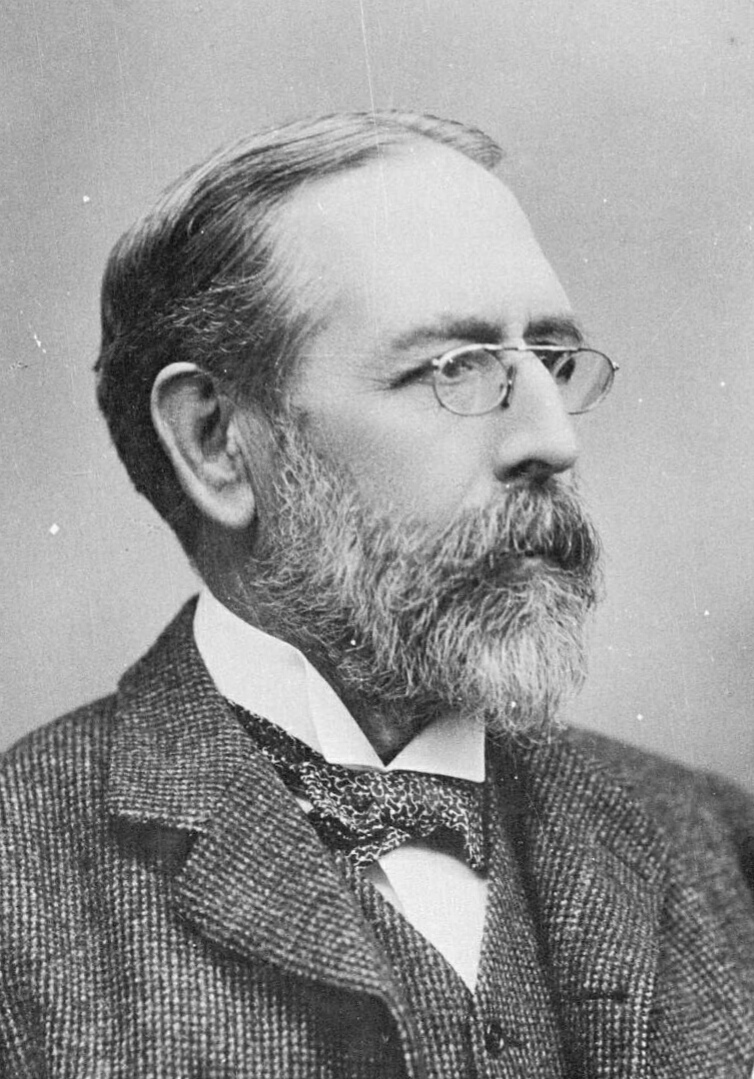
- Russell c. 1890

4th Leader of the Opposition
- In office 26 June 1894 – 3 July 1901
- Deputy: James Allen
- Preceded by: William Rolleston
- Succeeded by: William Massey

7th Minister of Defence
- In office 17 October 1889 – 24 January 1891
- Prime Minister: Harry Atkinson
- Preceded by: Thomas Fergus
- Succeeded by: Richard Seddon

11th Minister of Justice
- In office 17 October 1889 – 24 January 1891
- Prime Minister: Harry Atkinson
- Preceded by: Thomas Fergus
- Succeeded by: William Pember Reeves

Member of the New Zealand Parliament for Hawkes Bay
- In office 22 July 1884 – 20 December 1905
- Preceded by: Fred Sutton
- Succeeded by: Alfred Dillon

Personal details
- Born: William Russell Russell; 12 November 1838 Sandhurst, Berkshire, England
- Died: 24 September 1913 (aged 74) Napier, New Zealand
- Spouse: Harriette Julia Hodgkinson
- Relations: Andrew Russell (father); Harold Russell (son); Andrew Hamilton Russell (brother)
- Children: 7 sons & 4 daughters
- Profession: Farmer

Sir William Russell Russell (12 November 1838 – 24 September 1913) was a New Zealand politician from 1870 to 1905. He was a cabinet minister, and was recognised as Leader of the Opposition from 1894 to 1901. Though considered by other politicians to have little sympathy with working people as a major landowner, his panache and involvement in local affairs led him to be liked and admired by Hawkes Bay's élite.

== Biography ==
=== Early life and career ===
Russell was born in Sandhurst, Berkshire England and educated at the Royal Military College, Sandhurst. His father Andrew Russell was in the 58th Regiment of Foot, and Russell came with him to New Zealand in the 1840s. He then joined the 58th Regiment, and came to New Zealand as an ensign in 1857. He transferred to the 14th Regiment of Foot and came out to Auckland in 1861, serving until 1862. In 1862 he sold his Captain's commission to settle in Hawkes Bay taking up with his brother 31,000 acres of rolling hill country 25 miles west of Napier in Tunanui, part of it later known as Sherenden.

In Hawkes Bay Russell became involved in civic affairs and became renown for his capability as an administrator. He was to serve on a multitude of local bodies, including the Hawke's Bay County Council, Hospital and Charitable Aid Board, Education Board, Waste Land Board, and Rabbit Board. In addition he was a governor of the Napier High Schools' Board.

== Member of Parliament ==
New Zealand Parliament
Years	Term	Electorate	Party
1875–1879	6th	Napier	Independent
1879–1881	7th	Napier	Independent
1884–1887	9th	Hawke's Bay	Independent
1887–1890	10th	Hawke's Bay	Independent
1890–1893	11th	Hawke's Bay	Conservative
1893–1896	12th	Hawke's Bay	Conservative
1896–1899	13th	Hawke's Bay	Conservative
1899–1902	14th	Hawke's Bay	Conservative
1902–1905	15th	Hawke's Bay	Conservative

Russell was a member of the Hawke's Bay Provincial Council from 1870 until the abolition of the provinces in 1876. He won the election for the Napier electorate in the New Zealand Parliament on 30 December 1875 in the 1875 general election, and was re-elected on 8 September 1879 in the 1879 general election. In 1881 after an electorate redistribution, he was defeated by Fred Sutton for the Hawke's Bay electorate. He won the seat on 22 July 1884 in the 1884 general election, and held it until he was defeated by Alfred Dillon in 1905.

=== Cabinet Minister ===
He was a Minister (Postmaster-General) in the short-lived Fourth Atkinson ministry of 1884; which lasted only six (or fourteen) days. In 1887 he joined the Fifth (and last) Atkinson ministry, initially as a Minister without Portfolio before becoming Colonial Secretary, Minister of Defence and Minister of Justice from 1889. He represented the New Zealand government at the Federation Conference in Melbourne in 1890, and later at the Australian National Convention in Sydney in 1892.

=== Leader of the Opposition ===
When the Liberal government of John Ballance came to power in 1890, the Opposition had not yet coalesced into a truly formal party. Russell was recognised as Leader of the Opposition from 1894 to 1901. Noted for his courtesy, honesty and consideration, Russell was at times completely overwhelmed by Prime Minister Richard Seddon in the cut and thrust of parliamentary debate. Even members of his own party acknowledged his nature was ill-suited to parliamentary brawls.

In June 1900, following defeat at the 1899 general election, the opposition strength fell considerably. The conservative MPs could not agree on a new leader upon holding their first caucus of the session. However, Seddon still continued to address Russell as their leader until July 1901. For over two years the conservatives were virtually leaderless, although chief whip William Massey often informally filled the role and eventually succeeded Russell as leader in September 1903.

After Massey became Prime Minister in 1912 he later appointed Russell to the Legislative Council on 26 June 1913. He died at Napier soon after on 24 September 1913. Many years later his son Harold Russell was also appointed a member of the Legislative Council, serving from 1934 to 1938.

== Personal life ==
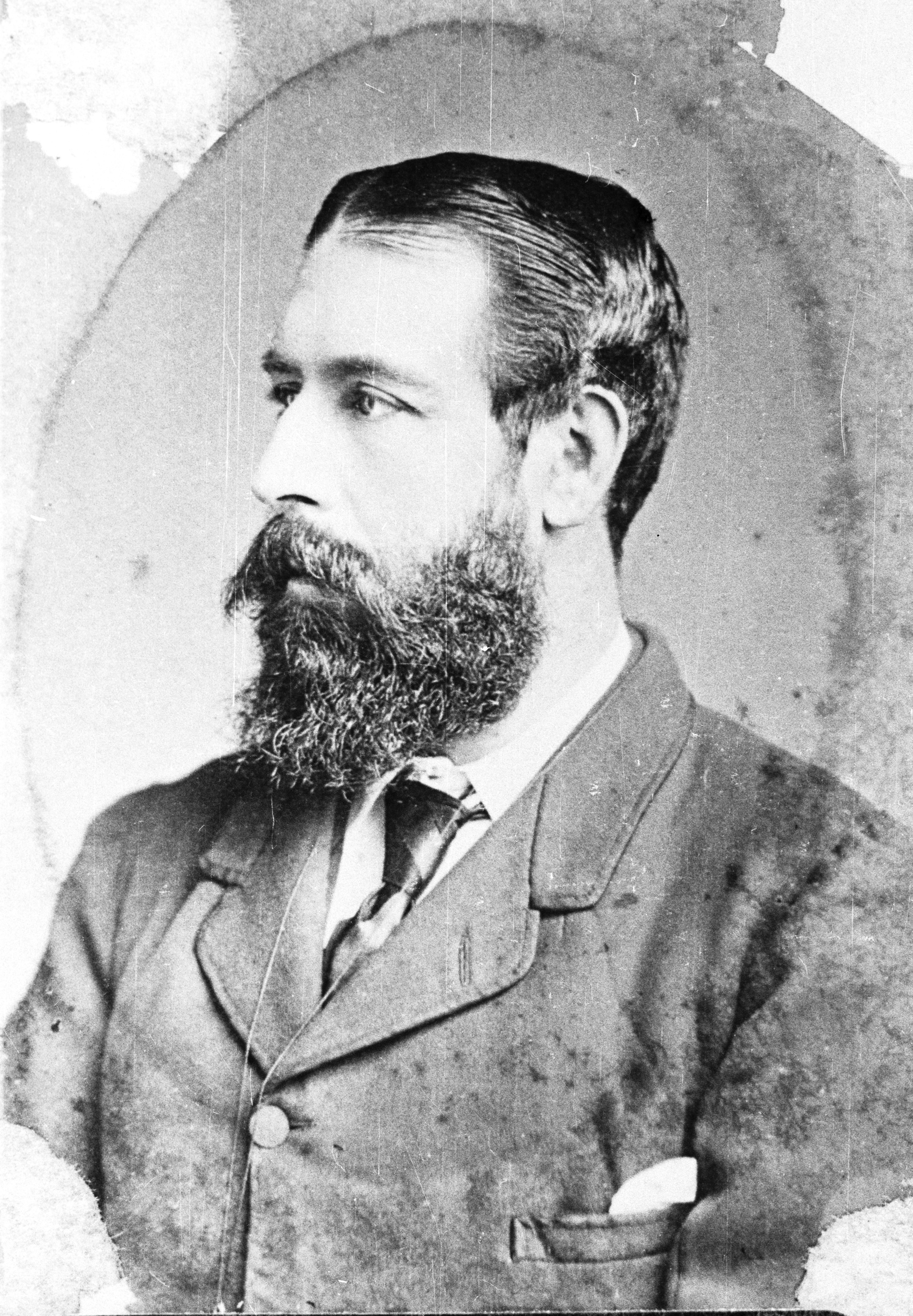
Russell in ca 1878

He married Miss Harriette Julia Hodgskin of Cawley Priory, Sussex, England, in 1867. They had eleven children, four daughters and seven sons. One son, Second Lieutenant Lionel Philip Russell, of the Second Battalion, Prince of Wale's Own (West Yorkshire Regiment) was attached to the 14th Mounted Infantry in the Second Boer War. He died aged 24 of the wounds he had received in Holland (19 December 1901). Another son, Captain Walter Russell 'Dick' Russell of the Northamptonshire Regiment, 2nd Battalion, attached to 1st Battalion, was killed in action on 23 October 1914 in France aged 33.

He lived on his estate Flaxmere near Hastings. He also owned Tunanui Station which he had bought with his brother near Napier. When the partnership expired he retained the Flaxmere and Sherenden estates. A sports lover, he was President of the New Zealand Jockey Club. Russell also bred and raced his own horses.

In recognition of his long service, he was made a knight bachelor on 14 August 1902, after the honour had been announced in the 1902 Coronation Honours list published on 26 June 1902. As was the custom until the first quarter of the 20th century he continued to use his military rank of captain until he was knighted. His full name according to electoral rolls and the Cyclopedia of New Zealand was Captain the Hon. William Russell Russell, then Sir William Russell Russell, i.e. Russell was his middle name and also his surname. His knighthood is the only such time in New Zealand history where the incumbent Prime Minister has recommended a Leader of the Opposition for such an honour.

== Notes ==
Political offices
Preceded by Thomas Fergus	Minister of Defence; 1889–1891	Succeeded by Richard Seddon
Preceded by Thomas Fergus	Minister of Justice; 1889–1891	Succeeded by William Pember Reeves
Preceded by Thomas Hislop	Colonial Secretary; 1889–1891	Succeeded by Patrick Buckley
Preceded by Julius Vogel	Postmaster-General and Commissioner of Telegraphs; 1884	Succeeded by Julius Vogel
New Zealand Parliament
Preceded by Donald McLean	Member of Parliament for Napier; 1875–1881; Served alongside: Donald McLean, Fred Sutton	Succeeded by John Buchanan
Preceded by Fred Sutton	Member of Parliament for Hawke's Bay; 1884–1905	Succeeded by Alfred Dillon
