= George Richardson (New Zealand politician) =

New Zealand politician

The Honourable George Richardson
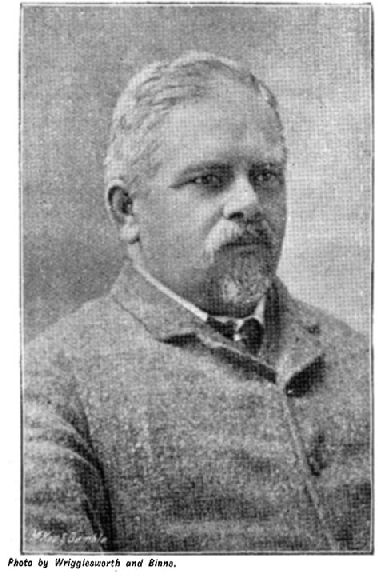

Member of the New Zealand Parliament for Mataura
- In office 1884–1893
- Preceded by: Francis Wallace Mackenzie
- Succeeded by: Robert McNab
- In office 1896–1898
- Preceded by: Robert McNab
- Succeeded by: Robert McNab

Personal details
- Born: George Frederick Richardson; 1837 Cheltenham, Gloucestershire, England
- Died: 23 October 1909 Wellington, New Zealand
- Spouse: Augusta Marie Isabella Paterson White (m. 1867)
- Occupation: Surveyor

George Frederick Richardson (1837 – 23 October 1909), sometimes published as George Francis Richardson, was a 19th-century Member of Parliament in Southland, New Zealand and a cabinet minister.

== Biography ==
New Zealand Parliament
Years	Term	Electorate	Party
1884–1887	9th	Mataura	Independent
1887–1890	10th	Mataura	Independent
1890–1893	11th	Mataura	Independent
1896–1898	13th	Mataura	Independent

Richardson was born in Cheltenham, England, and came to New Zealand in 1851 on the ship Dominion. He moved to Dunedin, where he qualified as a surveyor. In 1867 he married Augusta Marie Isabella Paterson White, daughter of Invercargill merchant Thomas John White; they had three daughters and two sons.

He represented the Mataura electorate from 1884 to 1893 when he was defeated, and from 1896 to 1898 when he was adjudged bankrupt.

He was Minister of Lands (8 October 1887 – 24 January 1891), Minister of Mines (8 October 1887 – 17 October 1889), Minister of Immigration (8 October 1887 – 24 January 1891) and Minister of Agriculture (17 October 1889 – 24 January 1891) in the 5th Atkinson Ministry.

In 1891 he was granted the right to retain the title of "Honourable". He died at his residence in Tinakori Road, Wellington on 23 October 1909, and was buried at Karori Cemetery.

== Notes ==
New Zealand Parliament
Preceded by Francis Wallace Mackenzie	Member of Parliament for Mataura; 1884–1893; 1896–1898	Succeeded by Robert McNab
Preceded by Robert McNab	Member of Parliament for Mataura; 1884–1893; 1896–1898	Succeeded by Robert McNab
