= Andrew Hamilton Russell =

New Zealand general (1868–1960)

Sir Andrew Hamilton Russell
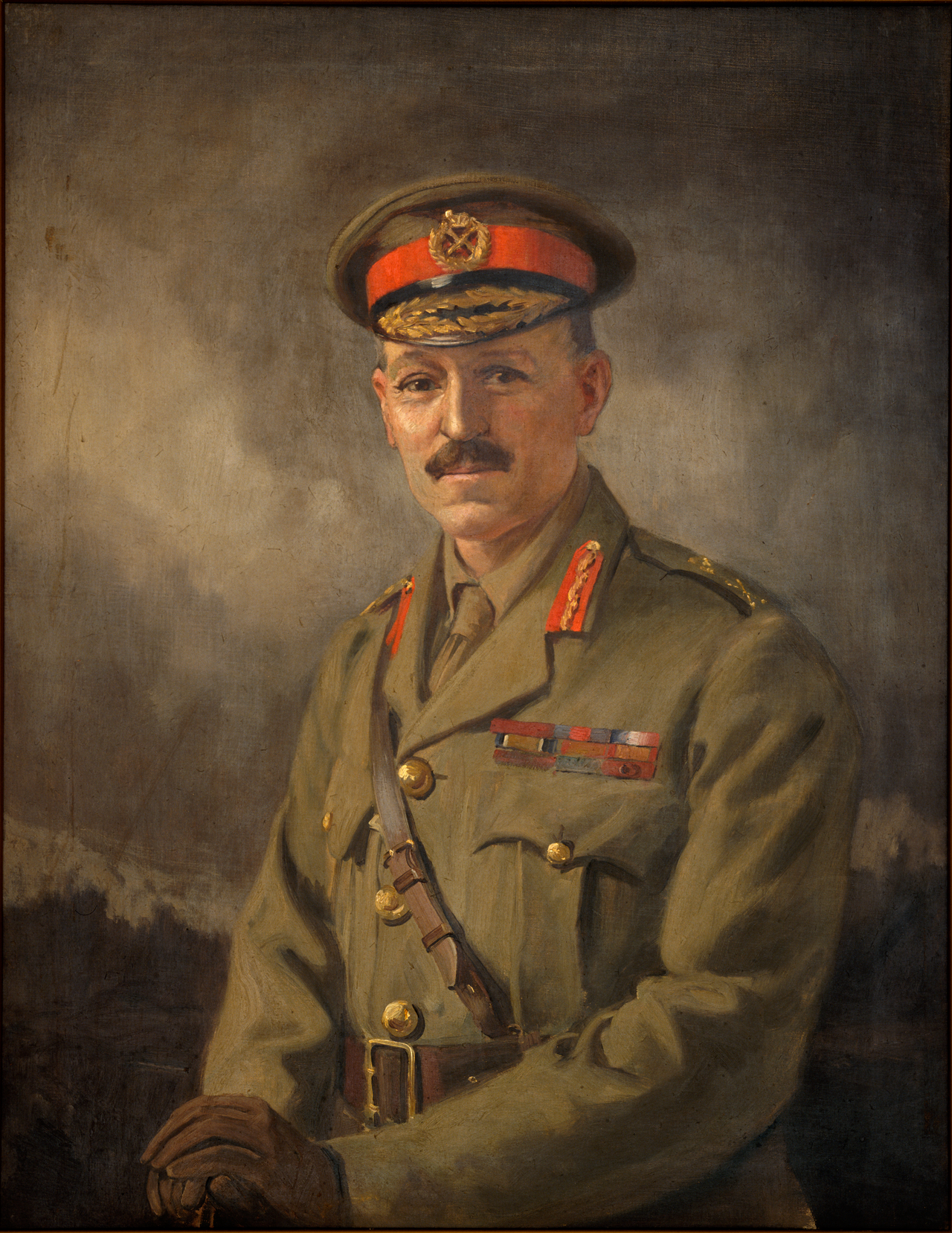
- Portrait painted by George Edmund Butler
- Born: 23 February 1868; Napier, New Zealand
- Died: 29 November 1960 (aged 92); Tunanui, New Zealand
- Military career
- Allegiance: United Kingdom; New Zealand
- Branch: British Army; New Zealand Military Forces
- Service years: 1887–1892; 1900–1932; 1940–1941
- Rank: Major General
- Unit: Border Regiment
- Commands: New Zealand Division; New Zealand and Australian Division; New Zealand Mounted Rifles Brigade
- Conflicts: First World War; Second World War
- Awards: Knight Commander of the Order of the Bath; Knight Commander of the Order of St Michael and St George; Mentioned in despatches (9)
- Other work: Returned Services' Association

Major General Sir Andrew Hamilton Russell KCB, KCMG (23 February 1868 – 29 November 1960) was a senior officer of the New Zealand Military Forces who served during the First World War.

Born in Napier, New Zealand, Russell spent most of his youth in England. He joined the British Army in 1888 and served in India before transferring to the Indian Army in pursuit of a more active life. He grew disillusioned with his career and resigned his commission in 1892 to become a farmer in New Zealand. Running a sheep farm on land owned by his father, he retained an interest in soldiering and helped raise a local militia unit before becoming a senior officer in the New Zealand Territorial Force.

Appointed to command the New Zealand Mounted Rifles Brigade upon the outbreak of war, he rose swiftly to high command during the Gallipoli campaign and in December 1915 became commander of the New Zealand and Australian Division. He oversaw the evacuation of the Australian and New Zealand Army Corps from Gallipoli. He commanded the New Zealand Division, formed in March 1916, throughout its service on the Western Front, leading it during major engagements during the Battles of the Somme, Messines and Passchendaele, the German spring offensive and the Hundred Days Offensive. After the war, he returned to farming life. He soon became heavily involved in veteran's affairs, lobbied in favour of defensive spending, and participated in local body politics. In the early years of the Second World War, he served as the Inspector General of New Zealand Military Forces. He died in 1960 at the age of 92 and is commemorated in Hastings Civic Square with a bronze statue standing over Russell Street next to the Hastings Cenotaph.

== Early life ==
Andrew Hamilton Russell, known as Guy to his family, was born on 23 February 1868 at Napier, New Zealand, the oldest son of Andrew Hamilton Russell, a farmer, and his wife. His family had a long military tradition dating back to the Napoleonic Wars, during which his great-grandfather served in the Black Watch Regiment while a grandfather served with the 58th Regiment during the New Zealand Wars and after retiring from the British Army took up farming in the Hawke's Bay region of New Zealand. Russell's father also served in the 58th Regiment before emigrating to New Zealand where he ran an isolated sheep station with his brother in Hawke's Bay.

After tiring of life in colonial New Zealand, Russell's father moved his family to England in 1874 and settled in Sedgley. After three years, the family returned to New Zealand, setting up a home in Flaxmere. The family were less isolated than at their previous home in the country and they had an active social life. However, finances became tight and the Russell family went back to England and then on to Switzerland, where they lived on the rental income from their property in New Zealand. Russell remained in England to be educated at Twyford School, near Winchester. In 1882, after coming top of his final year at Twyford, and encouraged by both his father and grandfather to pursue a career in science or law, he went on to Harrow School. He did not perform well in his academic studies, preferring instead sports and the school's Cadet Corps.

== Military career ==
In 1885, Russell left Harrow and after spending several months in Germany learning the language, he sat the entrance examination for the Royal Military College at Sandhurst. Two days before taking the exam, he received the news of his mother's death. Despite this he scored high marks and duly entered Sandhurst in September 1886. Excelling in his military studies, he won the Sword of Honour as the best performing cadet of his intake, making him "the first New Zealand-born officer to achieve that distinction", and passed out in August 1887. He was commissioned as a second lieutenant into the 1st Battalion of the Border Regiment of the British Army, which was then stationed in Sialkot in British India, where he arrived in January 1888.

There was little action to enliven Russell's time in India and he found duty there tedious. Much of his time was spent riding and he earned a "great reputation as a polo player". A year later, his battalion was transferred to garrison duties in Burma which, at the time, was experiencing some unrest as bandits carried out guerrilla warfare against the British rulers. However, apart from one minor skirmish, Russell saw little action and spent much of his time training mounted infantry. The battalion was stationed in Burma for six months before it moved to England to return to its home barracks in Dover, Kent. Disillusioned with how his military career was developing, he began to consider leaving the army. In June 1891, after applications to join units in Southern Africa were rejected, he transferred to the British Indian Army. Assigned to a substandard infantry regiment back in Burma, he grew even more dissatisfied with his military career and in August 1892, he resigned his commission.

== Farming life ==
Russell returned to New Zealand to pursue sheep farming albeit somewhat unenthusiastically. At one stage, he went to Australia to investigate farming prospects there but soon decided New Zealand offered better opportunities. He was taken on as a farming cadet on sheep stations in Tunanui and Flaxmere, jointly owned by his father and uncle, with a view to running his father's share of the property. In 1895, when the farming partnership between his father and uncle was amicably dissolved and the stations subdivided, Russell took on responsibility for his father's land. The same year, he began a courtship with Gertrude Williams whose family had extensive land holdings in the Hawke's Bay. The couple eventually married in August 1896, and would go on to have five children.

Farming was at times difficult; much of his father's land was bush country and needed to cleared before it could be converted to pasture. Russell also had to contend with low wool and meat prices as well as occasional floods and droughts. However, the farm was running at a profit by 1905 and he requested his father give him a lease on the land and this was granted the following year. A few years later he took over full ownership of the farm by buying out his siblings' interest in the property. In addition to his farming, Russell pursued business and political interests. In 1899, he played a role in the development of the Farmers' Union and later became chairman of its Hawke's Bay chapter. He took up directorships of several large businesses in the area. In 1905, he became heavily involved in the Political Reform League which worked to promote conservative views and candidates for public office.

=== Militia service ===
Despite an active working and business life, Russell was prominent in the raising of a militia unit of the New Zealand Volunteer Force following the outbreak of the Boer War in 1899. He commanded the unit, the Wellington (East Coast) Mounted Rifles Regiment, which by 1901 numbered about 900 men. Most of his volunteers were young farm workers who provided their own horses and saddles, while the Defence Department provided rifles and other equipment. Russell set about training his unit, an experience that he greatly enjoyed and which rekindled his interest in the military. However, his work and family commitments kept him from volunteering for active service in South Africa.

The New Zealand Volunteer Force declined in the years after the Boer War and Russell endeavoured to keep his regiment, comprising five squadrons of mounted infantry, well trained and prepared for any future hostilities. He was promoted to major in 1907, and lieutenant colonel in 1910. At this time, New Zealand's military was being reorganised under the overview of Major General Alexander Godley, an officer in the British Army and newly appointed commander of the New Zealand Military Forces. Compulsory military training was introduced and the Volunteer Force was abolished and replaced with a Territorial Force. Godley was impressed with Russell's work with his regiment of mounted infantry and in 1911, he was appointed commander of the 9th Wellington East Coast Mounted Rifles. Godley later offered Russell a position as a professional soldier, holding the rank of lieutenant colonel, in the New Zealand Military Forces. He declined, preferring a role in the field. Instead, Russell went to England for six months on secondment to the British Army.

In October 1913, New Zealand's military provided assistance to the government in maintaining order during a strike in Wellington involving mining and waterfront unions. Infantry were drawn from territorial formations and appointed special constables in order to support the police in Wellington. Russell commanded the mounted contingent of special constables, which became known as "Massey's Cossacks" after William Massey, the prime minister. His men broke up pickets and cleared the docks of striking workers, duties which would occupy them for nearly two months before order was fully restored. The following year, Russell's men would again be used to maintain order, this time at a training camp in the Hawke's Bay, following a riot by territorial infantry protesting at the imposition of compulsory military training and its effect on their ability to work and support their families.

== First World War ==
On the outbreak of the First World War in August 1914, the New Zealand government offered Great Britain a New Zealand Expeditionary Force (NZEF) for service in the war. The offer, the first to be made by a Dominion of Great Britain, was quickly accepted. Godley set about raising the NZEF, the main body of which was to consist of an infantry brigade, a mounted brigade, an artillery brigade and various support units. Russell was offered command of the New Zealand Mounted Rifles Brigade which he duly accepted. Promoted to brigadier general, he departed New Zealand with the main body of the NZEF on 16 October 1914 as its highest ranking territorial officer.

=== Gallipoli ===
The NZEF was originally destined for France to serve on the Western Front but the Turks then entered the war and were perceived to be a threat to the Suez Canal. Subsequently the NZEF and the Australian Imperial Force (AIF), traveling in convoy, were diverted to the Middle East. Now based in Egypt, the NZEF carried out intensive preparations for active service. Russell oversaw the training of his brigade in shooting, tactics, map reading and navigation. While in Egypt, the New Zealand and Australian Division was formed, with Russell's brigade joining the New Zealand Infantry Brigade, 1st Australian Light Horse Brigade and the 4th Australian Infantry Brigade. The new division was part of the Mediterranean Expeditionary Force that was to be landed at Gallipoli, in the Dardanelles. The area designated for the landings was not appropriate for horses and only the division's two infantry brigades embarked for Gallipoli. Much to his frustration, Russell's brigade remained in Egypt. However, casualties amongst the infantry eventually led to the transfer of Russell's command, without its horses which remained in Egypt, to Gallipoli in early May.

On its arrival in the front lines on 12 May 1915, the Mounted Rifles was deployed on the northern (or left) sector of the Australian and New Zealand Army Corps (ANZAC) perimeter and relieved a brigade of Royal Marines Light Infantry. It would remain here for three months. The area was overlooked by the Sari Bair range and the Turks dominated with snipers and machine gun fire. Russell set his men to improving the defensive arrangements of their positions, digging trenches and saps and implementing countermeasures. He made his headquarters on an elevated plateau which would become known as Russell's Top, only 40 metres (130 ft) from the front line and sharing the discomfort and dangers with his men. A week after arriving, the Mounted Rifles helped to fend off a Turkish night attack across the entire front line. The Turks lost 10,000 men killed and wounded, and the next morning, Godley, the divisional commander, ordered a counterattack. Russell, aware of how exposed to Turkish machine gun fire an advance across the front lines would be, refused to order the attack. Despite insisting his orders be followed, Godley eventually conceded.

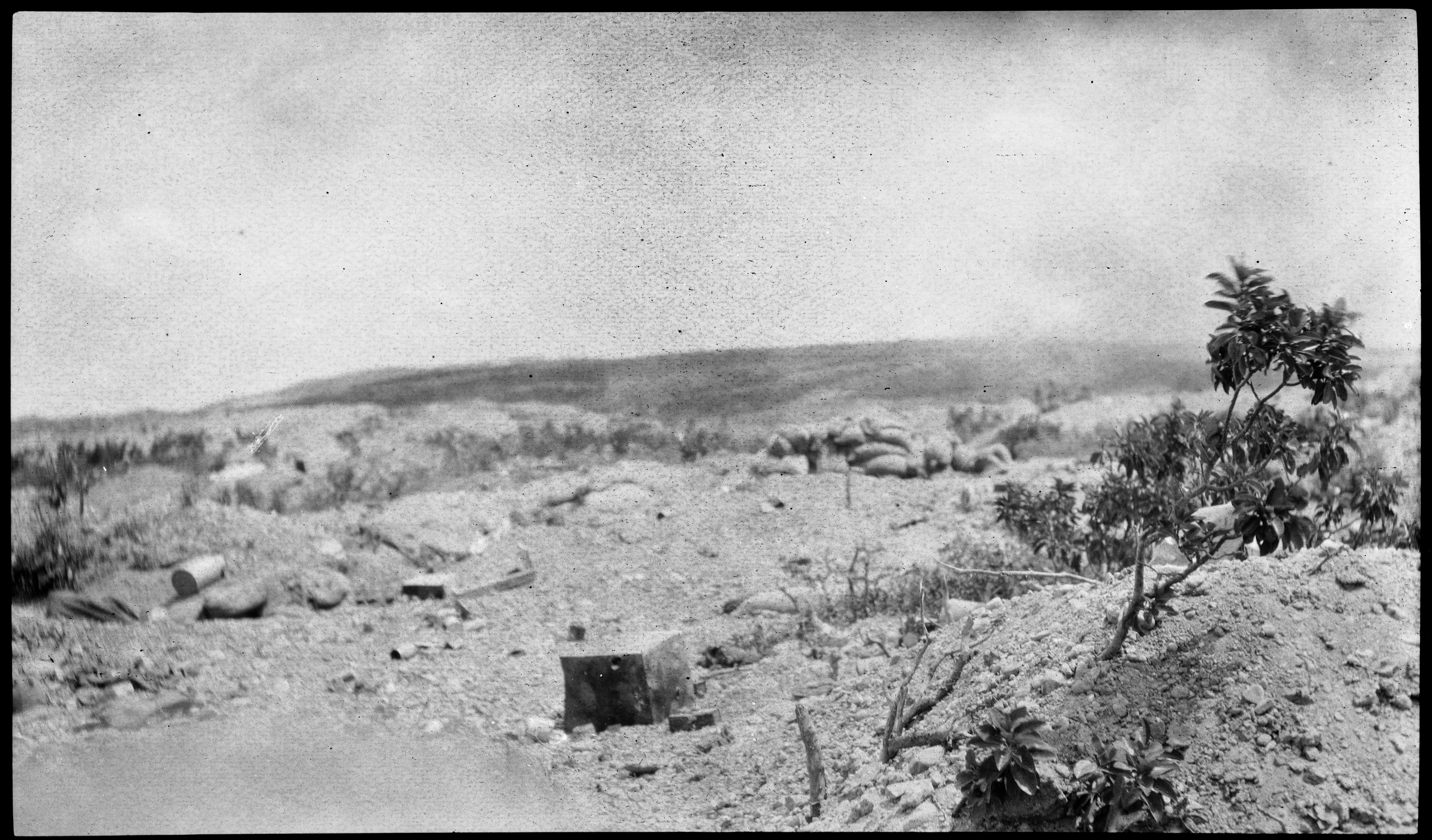
The feature known as Russell's Top, where Russell established his headquarters for the first three months of the Gallipoli campaign

In August 1915, Russell's brigade participated in the Battle of Sari Bair, an attempt to break the stalemate that existed at Gallipoli. Commanding a contingent of Maori pioneers in addition to his own brigade, the Turkish positions at No. 3 Outpost, Table Top Hill and Bauchop's Hill, guarding the approach to the Sari Bair ridge, were captured in a well organised attack on the night of 6 August. Russell took care to ensure his men fully understood their roles and the tactics to be used. Originally, Russell's brigade was to have been the spearhead of the attack on Chunuk Bair itself but was shunted into the supporting role of securing the approach. The capture of the Turkish positions cleared the way for the New Zealand Infantry Brigade to make its way up the slopes of Chunuk Bair. Heavy losses were incurred amongst the infantry making an initial attack during daylight hours. A nighttime attack was planned using two squadrons of Russell's command together with the Wellington Infantry Battalion. This succeeded and the peak of Chunuk Bair was captured in the early hours of 8 August. The peak was exposed to gunfire from neighbouring Hill Q, which made it difficult to dig in. The battalion held Chunuk Bair for a day until relieved by the Otago Infantry Battalion and two more squadrons of Russell's mounteds. The peak was lost the following day after it was handed over to two British battalions and the Sair Bair ridge remained in Turkish hands. Later, Godley regretted the change to the original plan, considering that Russell, after taking the approaches to the Sari Bair ridge, could have proceeded on and secured Chunuk Bair and Hill Q with his brigade.

Two weeks later, Russell's brigade was involved in attacks on Hill 60, positioned between the ANZAC positions and the British 9th Corps at Suvla Bay. Russell's command, which also included 500 men from the Australian 4th Infantry Brigade and a battalion of Irish Rangers, was part of a three brigade attack, commanded by Brigadier General Charles Cox, from the ANZAC front while elements of 9th Corps attacked from the other side. On 21 August, in broad daylight but supported by artillery, Russell's forces succeeded in capturing a portion of the Turkish trenches. The upper reaches of the hill remained in Turkish hands and an attack by Australian reinforcements the following day failed. Russell had wanted the reinforcements to advance at night but was overruled by Cox. Instead, he committed the inexperienced Australians without adequate preparation. On 27 August, Russell mounted a further attack. The New Zealanders managed to gain a foothold further up the slopes of Hill 60 and the next day, the Australian 10th Light Horse supplemented the gains made when they captured a trench on the crest of the hill. The remainder of the crest remained in Turkish hands for the rest of the campaign. Despite the fighting at Hill 60 only being a partial success, Godley noted that Russell "...is really quite an exceptionally good man".

On 13 September Russell and his men were withdrawn to Lemnos for a rest. By this time, casualties had seen his brigade, which had arrived at Gallipoli with 2,000 men, reduced to around 250. Shortly afterwards, Russell went to Egypt to inspect reinforcements for the brigade. He also advised on the state of the British Territorial regiments at Gallipoli and was unimpressed with their quality. He returned to Lemnos with 1,100 reinforcements and reorganised his brigade. It returned to Gallipoli in November although it was understrength despite the reinforcements. He was mentioned in despatches shortly afterwards.

Promoted to major general, Russell took over command of the New Zealand and Australian Division on 27 November from Godley, who became commander of ANZAC. He was the first New Zealand-born soldier to reach this rank. By this time, the Allies had decided to abandon the campaign in Gallipoli and evacuate its forces. Russell was placed in command of the rearguard, numbering 20,000 men, which covered the evacuation from Anzac Cove. The withdrawal went smoothly, and in the early hours on 20 December, Russell departed the beaches of Gallipoli, with the final 2,000 men of his rearguard following shortly afterwards.

Russell was one of the few general officers to have performed creditably during the Gallipoli campaign. Both Godley and Birdwood thought highly of him, the latter describing him as "an excellent commander". General Sir Ian Hamilton, commander of the Mediterranean Expeditionary Force for most of the campaign, had come to view Russell as "the outstanding personality on the [Gallipoli] Peninsula".

=== Western Front ===
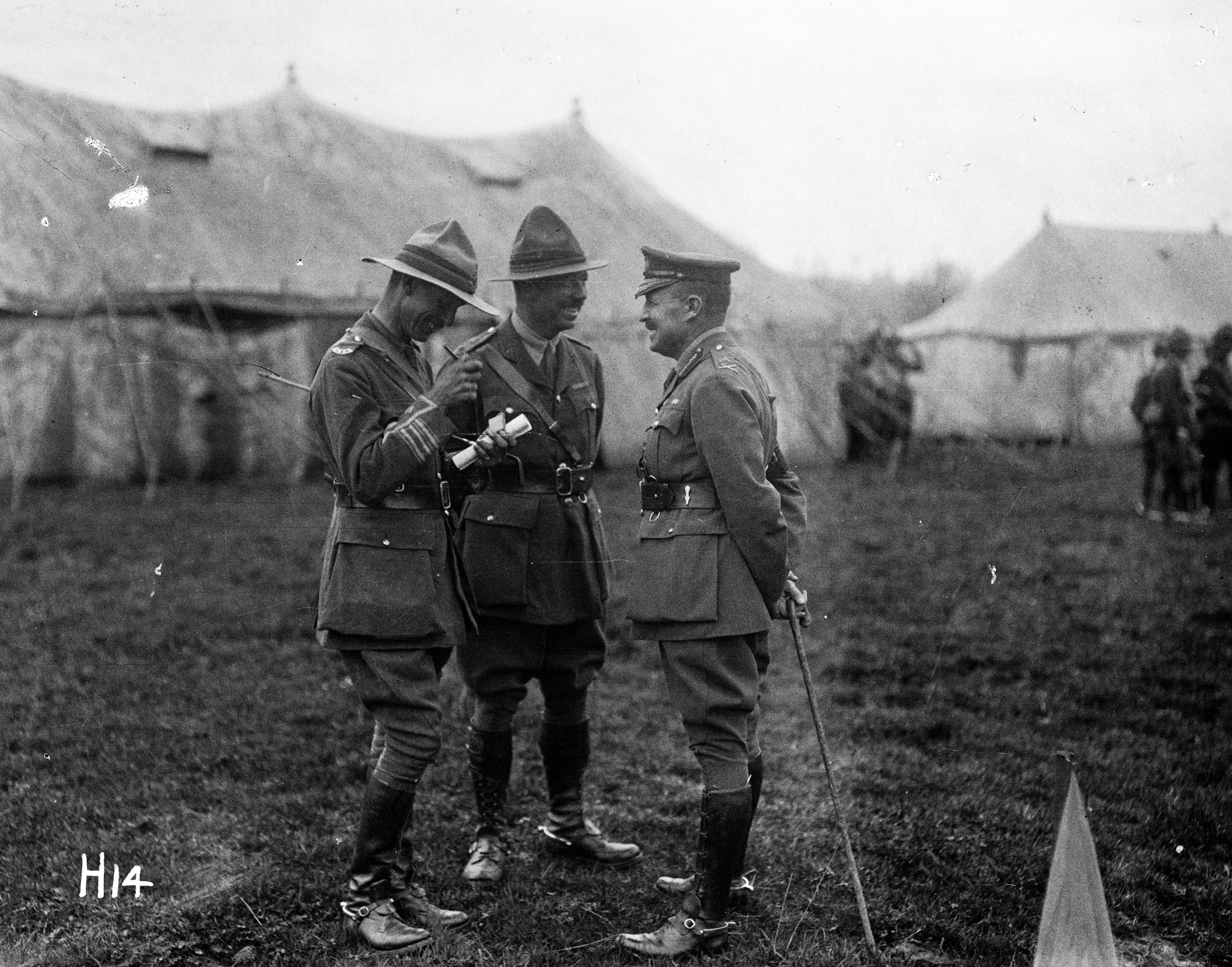
Russell, on the right, with two officers of the New Zealand Division

The New Zealanders were back in Egypt by late 1915 to recover and recuperate. When the New Zealand Division was formed in March 1916, Russell was selected as its divisional commander. He immediately set about a training regime for his soldiers, many of whom were inexperienced replacements, to prepare them for combat. Initially, the division was tasked with defending a section of the Suez Canal but it was then decided that it would join two Australian divisions in France.

The New Zealand Division, which totalled some 15,000 men in its ranks, departed Egypt in early April and proceed to the Armentières sector of the Western Front, as part of General Herbert Plumer's Second Army. Here the New Zealanders would undergo intensive training in trench warfare. The Armentières front line was regarded by the Allies as a nursery sector where new units could undergo familiarisation without being called upon for intensive offensive operations. By 16 May, Russell's command had responsibility for a 5.4 kilometres (3.4 mi) stretch of the front line. He was not content to take a defensive posture as the German troops opposing his division did; instead he sought to control no-man's land, ordering regular patrols be dispatched and seeking to establish dominance over the enemy's sniping activities. It also carried out raids on the opposing trenches, seeking to capture prisoners and gain intelligence.

Soon the New Zealand Division was involved in supporting the Somme Offensive, which opened on 1 July, with the objective being to tie down German troops so they could not be transferred to the Somme sector. This exposed problems and strained the men as extensive raids and patrols were carried out. Russell pushed for improvement, his goal being to create the best division in France. He inspected units daily and regularly visited the front line, even going into no-man's land on two occasions. He closely monitored discipline, and not just that of the enlisted personnel; officers were expected to perform well if they were to lead troops and Russell was not above removing those that did not meet his expectations. His insistence on rigid discipline was balanced by intensive training and tempered by close attention to the welfare of the troops under his command. In a letter to James Allen, the New Zealand Minister of Defence, Russell wrote: "What we want is a platoon officer who will look after his men exactly as a mother does her boy of 10".

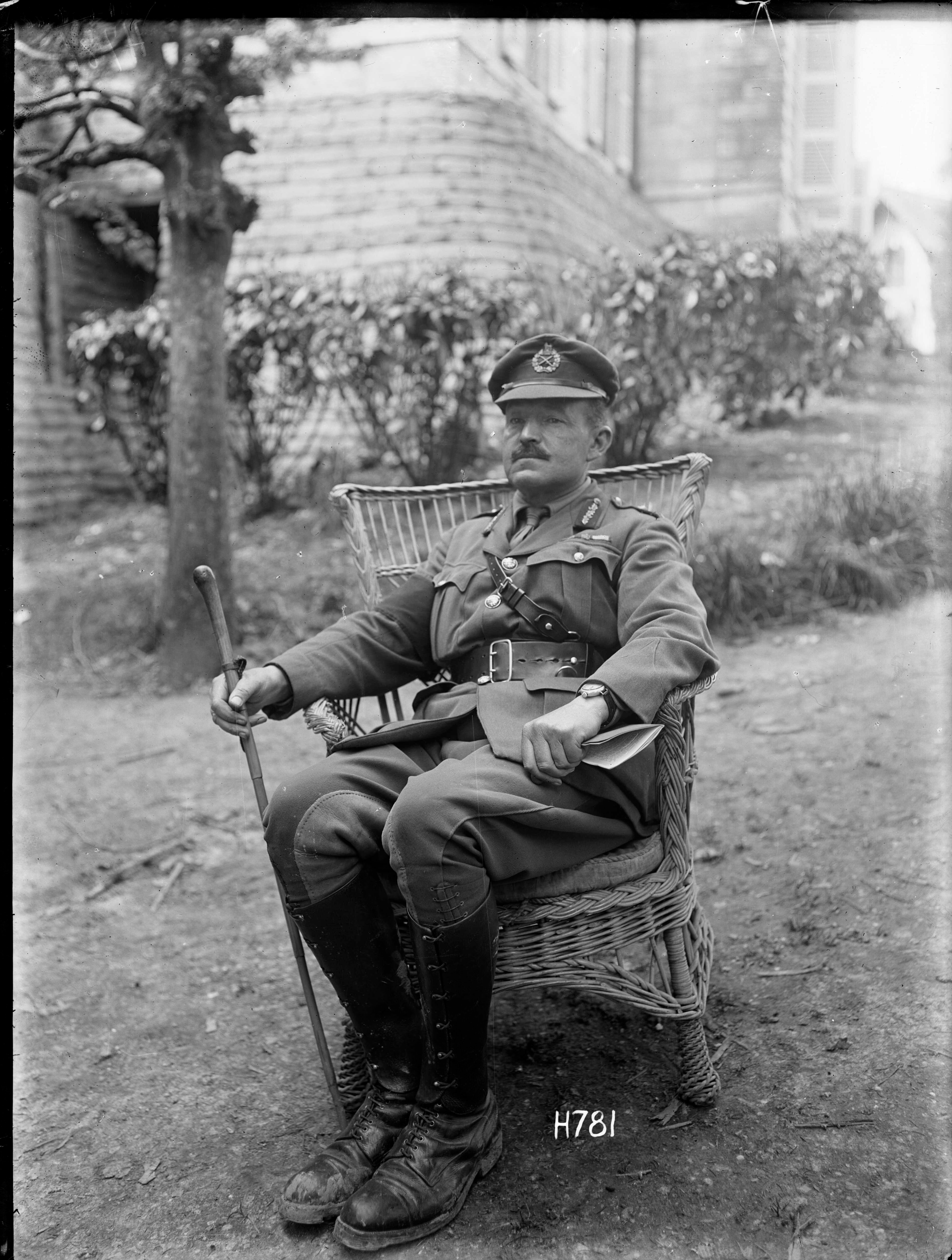
Russell in May 1918

British High Command planned on using the New Zealand Division in the ongoing Somme offensive and the New Zealanders were withdrawn from the Armentières sector on 18 August, having incurred over 2,000 casualties. It began preparing for a role in its first major attack, in particular, practicing advancing behind a creeping artillery barrage. The attack was to be accompanied by tanks although Russell was not convinced of their value when he attended a demonstration on their use. In early September the division moved from its rest area at Hallencourt to the Somme, reaching Fricourt on 9 September. It was to be part of XV Corp's attack on the villages of Flers and Gueudecourt, with the New Zealanders tasked with the capture of two key trench systems; Russell considered that the task was to his "liking".

The New Zealand Division began its attack on 15 September, ending the day with three of its four objectives in hand. By nightfall the next day, it had achieved the last of its objectives, having incurred losses of around 2,500 men. The next few days were spent improving their positions and then, on 25 September, it was part of another attack forward.

It spent the longest period in the front line of all of the divisions involved and gained a reputation for its fighting prowess. This came at a cost of 7,400 casualties since its introduction to the offensive on 15 September.

In June 1917 the New Zealand Division was involved in the capture of Messines Ridge. On a visit to the front line at Messines, Russell was nearly killed when a "sniper's bullet passed through his steel helmet, creasing his scalp". Failure came however on 12 October that year at the First Battle of Passchendaele, when – in what is still the costliest day in New Zealand's military history – the New Zealanders' second assault was repulsed with 2,735 casualties. Russell took the blame, in what military historian Christopher Pugsley called "a rare example of a military commander's willingness to accept responsibility for failure", though Pugsley attributes the main fault to the staff of the corps commander, General Godley.

After further failure at Polderhoek in December and a hard winter in the Ypres salient, Russell worked to rebuild the division and its morale. Despite this, by now, as historian Les Carlyon notes: "There were no better troops on the western front than the New Zealanders". Throughout 1918, Russell emphasised training as new mobile warfare tactics evolved: this proved its worth during the Hundred Days Offensive that ended the war. In June Field Marshal Sir Douglas Haig, who was a great admirer of Russell, offered him command of a British corps – the only Dominion commander to be so asked – but he diplomatically declined in order to stay with the New Zealanders.

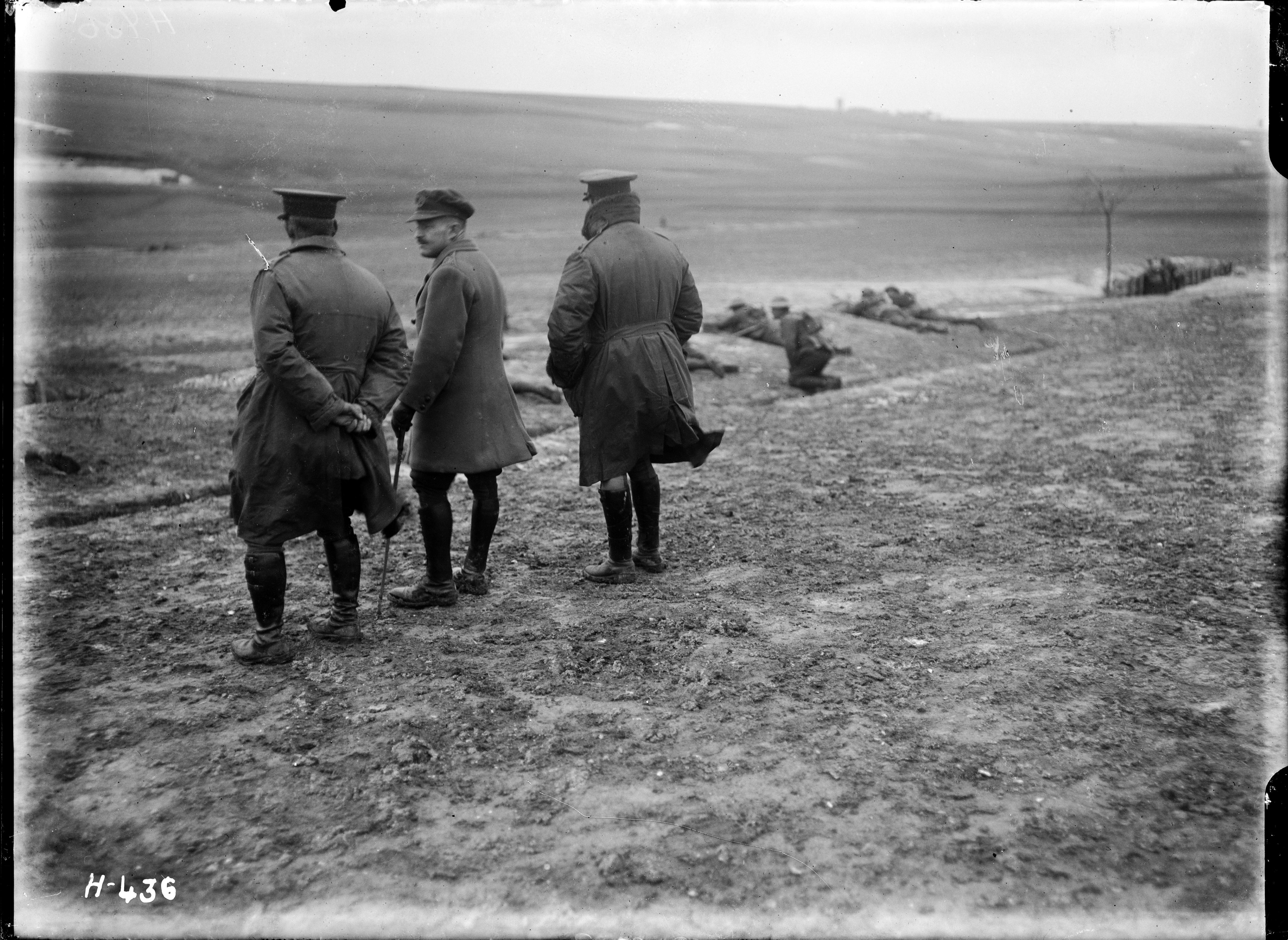
The GOC New Zealand Division, Major General Russell (middle), along with other officers, stand observing field operations in Belgium, March 1918.

Russell commanded the New Zealand Division for the remainder of the war. In the 1918 New Year Honours, he was appointed a Knight Commander in the Order of the Bath.

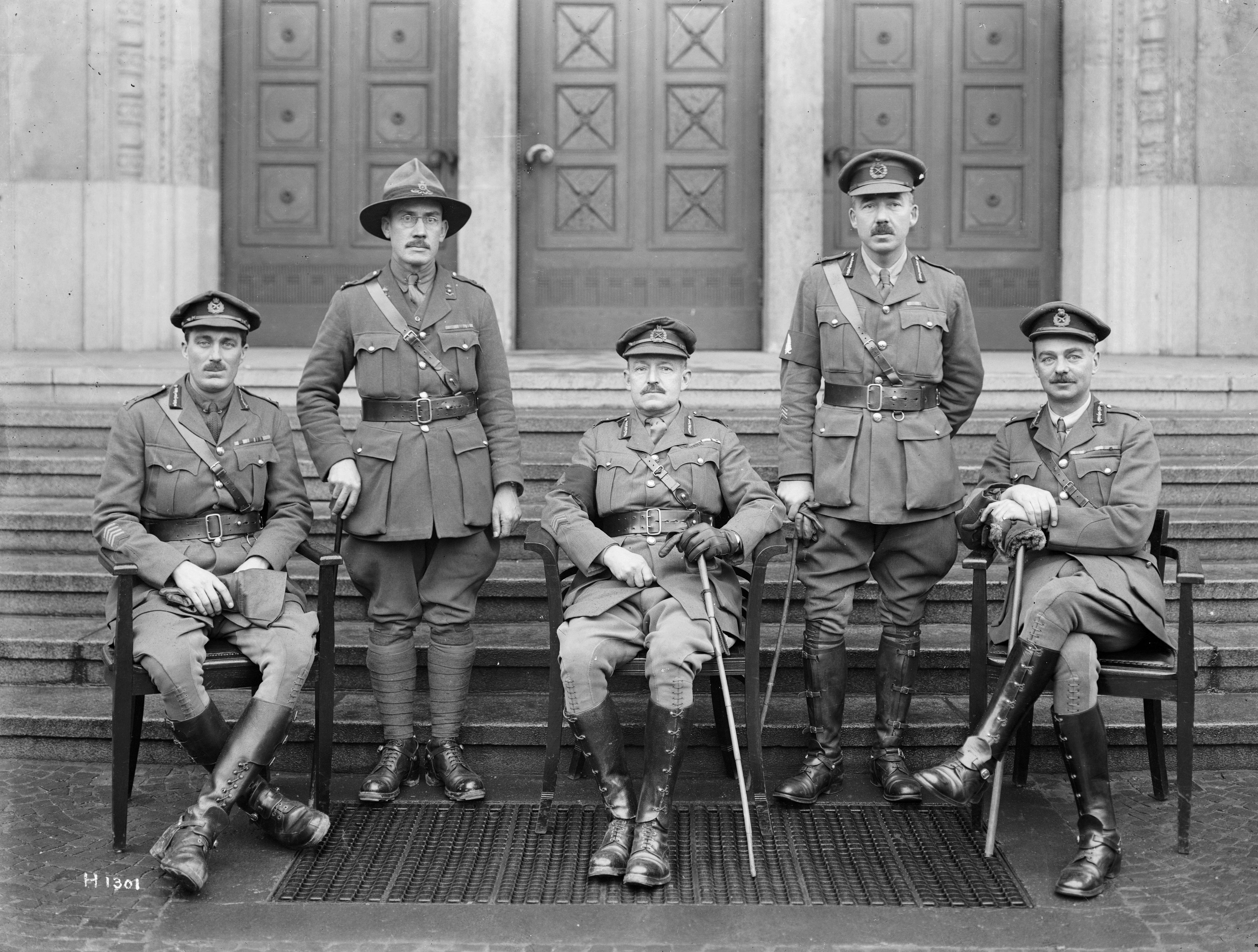
Russell, centre front, with some of the senior officers of the New Zealand Division, 1919

At the end of the war, the New Zealand Division performed garrison duty in Germany, based at Cologne. To prepare his soldiers for a civilian life, Russell secured funding from the New Zealand government for educational and trade training. By December 1918, the longest serving personnel of the New Zealand Division were demobilising and returning to New Zealand. Russell remained in command of those remaining until the end of January 1919 when, due to pneumonia, he took sick leave. He recuperated in the south of France but was soon taking care of his sister and daughter when they became stricken with the Spanish flu. The stress led to a collapse while traveling in France.

=== Return to New Zealand ===
Russell returned to New Zealand in April 1919 aboard Arawa, accompanied by his now recovered daughter. He attended civic receptions in Christchurch and Wellington, being hailed at the latter as New Zealand's 'Ariki Toa', or 'Fighting Chief'. When speaking to the audience, he reminded listeners of the fighting deeds of the men under his command during the war. When in Wellington, and being hosted at a Parliamentary lunch, he spoke of the need to care for the returning fighting soldiers after their war service.

After a final reception at Hastings, Russell returned to his farm in New Zealand where he would spend much of the next two years resting from the strain of his command during the war. He had been recognised with numerous awards for his service in the war. In addition to his British honours, he received a number of foreign decorations including the French Légion d'honneur (croix d'officier) and Croix de guerre (avec palme), the Belgian Ordre de Léopold (commander) and Croix de guerre, the Serbian Order of the White Eagle (first class) and the Montenegrin Order of Prince Danilo I.

== Later life ==
Even though he was physically recuperating at his farm, Russell remained keenly interested in current affairs. He anticipated the postwar recovery of Germany and also the increased presence of Japan in world affairs and argued New Zealand needed to be prepared. He became the president of the National Defence League (NDL), which agitated for improved defensive arrangements in response to the New Zealand government's trimming of its expenditure on the military. The NDL also promoted the idea of a "White New Zealand", a bastion of Western civilisation in the South Pacific that should be resistant to immigrants from Asian countries. He was also appointed Dominion Commandant of the New Zealand branch of the Legion of Frontiersmen.

An economic slump in 1921 affected the rural sector of New Zealand, with meat and wool fetching lower export prices. This impacted the running of Russell's farm. He trimmed domestic staff at his homestead and, after consulting with his farm workers, reduced wages instead of making redundancies. The previous year, he had leased small sections of land, with a right to purchase, to returned soldiers for farming. They too suffered financially and were unable to take up their option to purchase the leased land. Russell ensured they did not unduly suffer financially. The reduced income from the farm affected his ability to send funds to his sisters in England.

=== Politics ===
In 1922, Russell contested the Hawke's Bay electorate in the 1922 election. Although he was the Reform Party's candidate, he described himself as an independent. He did not agree with his party's position on land settlement and establishment of business initiatives for farmers. He came second after Gilbert McKay of the Liberal Party, securing 3,552 votes to the winner's 3,903.

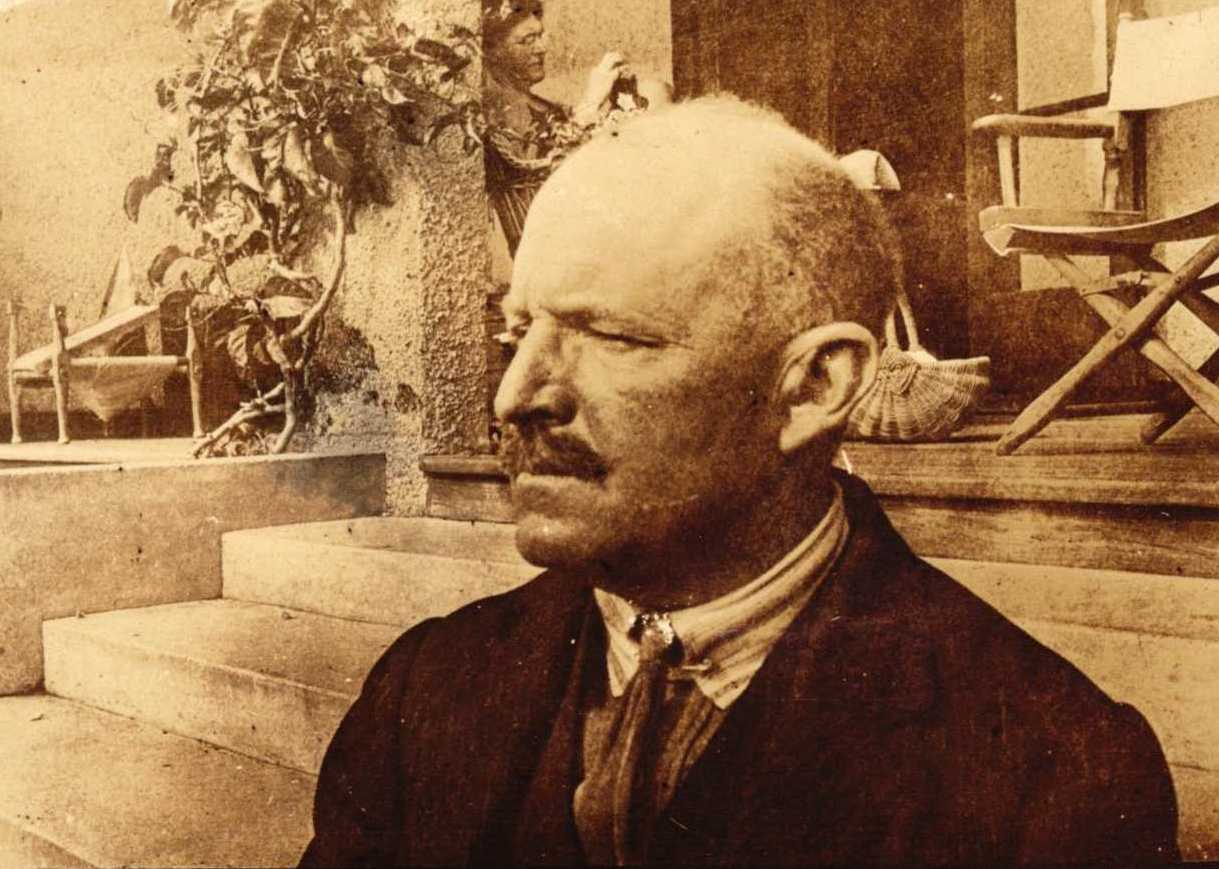
Andrew Hamilton Russell in 1923

=== Veterans' affairs ===
Russell also occupied himself with veterans' affairs; he was unanimously elected president of the Royal New Zealand Returned and Services' Association (RSA) in 1921. His involvement in the RSA helped establish it in New Zealand society during the immediate postwar period. Always interested in the welfare of the soldiers he had formerly commanded during the First World War, he sought to assist their integration back into society. He agitated for improvements in pensions for war widows and disabled soldiers. Thanks in part to his efforts, the introduction of the War Pensions Act was introduced the following year, improving the financial position of many returned soldiers.

In 1924, Russell stood down as president of the RSA so he could travel abroad, but resumed his leadership role in 1926. He remained in this capacity until 1935, when, increasingly tired of the impositions on his time, he resigned. He was succeeded by William Perry. In honour of his presidency, a portrait of Russell by the war artist Archibald Baxter was donated to the nation. Although no longer the organisation's leader, he subsequently led a 1500-strong contingent of the RSA to Sydney in 1938, commemorating 150 years of European settlement in Australia.

Russell was involved in the Territorial Force in an honorary capacity and on 12 May 1935, presented a guidon to the 9th (Wellington East Coast) Mounted Rifles at that year's training camp in Napier.

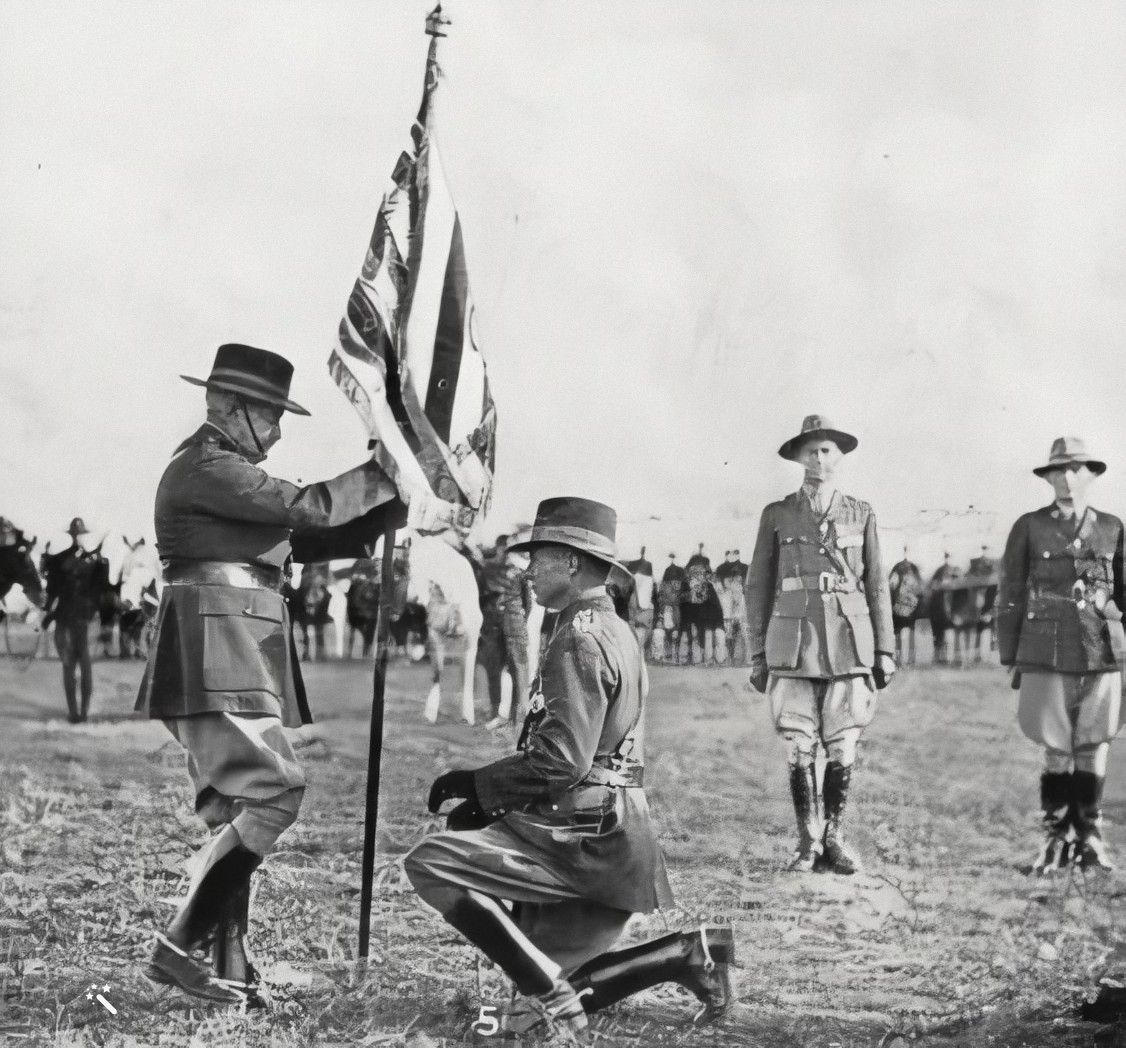
Sir Andrew Russell presents the guidon of the 9th Wellington East Coast Mounted Rifles to its commanding officer

=== Second World War ===
Although Russell had long ended his military career, having been moved to the retired list in 1932, he was called upon following the outbreak of the Second World War. As the 2nd New Zealand Expeditionary Force (2NZEF) was being organised, his advice on its use was sought after. He also approved of the appointment of Major General Bernard Freyberg as the commander of the 2NZEF, regarding him as "a good fighting man". He was also appointed to the War Council, which made recommendations to the War Cabinet on military matters. However, the War Council lacked executive powers and proved to be relatively ineffective. In September 1940, he was appointed the Inspector-General of New Zealand Military Forces which was responsible for inspecting and reporting on the country's home defences. It was an important role, for there was a genuine threat of a Japanese invasion and it had been made clear to the New Zealand government that the Royal Navy, long thought to be part of the country's defence arrangements, would be unlikely to help.

In his inspectorate role, Russell travelled extensively throughout the country, assessing its defensive arrangements as well as the training and equipping of military personnel. He recommended the Royal New Zealand Air Force prioritise the acquisition of long-range reconnaissance aircraft, seeing these as vital to the defence of New Zealand. He also identified training issues in the New Zealand Territorial Force and the best use of the Home Guard which, by 1941, numbered 100,000 men. However, his recommendations were often not enacted and his working relationship with Fred Jones, the Minister for Defence, was strained. In fact, he advocated for Jones to be sacked. Increasingly frustrated at his lack of traction, and believing a younger man would be better suited for the role, he retired his inspectorate in July 1941. He recommended that the duties of the role be devolved onto the military district commanders. He remained on the War Council until June 1942, by which time he had tired of its lack of impact on the direction of the war effort. Despite the protestations of Prime Minister Peter Fraser, he tendered his resignation.

== Final years ==
In the postwar period, Russell continued to farm his property although he ceased the physical labour and left day-to-day management to staff. The farm struggled with drought and pests, which saw him having to sell much of his cattle. He also began to step down from the many boards and trusts with which he had been involved. Two of his sisters that he had supported for much of his life died in 1945 and 1953 respectively and their property in England was sold, with Russell inheriting the proceeds. He remained an important figure in the Hawkes Bay community and on 11 November 1956, laid the foundation stone for what became Hastings's Second World War memorial, the Hastings and District War Memorial Library.

Andrew Russell died on 29 November 1960, aged 92, at the family homestead near Hastings. After a well attended service at St Matthew's Anglican Church in Hastings, at which his pallbearers included several senior officers of the New Zealand Army including the Chief of General Staff Major General Leonard Thornton, his remains were cremated. He was survived by his wife and four children. One of his two sons, John Tinsley Russell, served with the New Zealand Divisional Cavalry during the Second World War and was killed in action during the Western Desert campaign. John's death affected his father deeply; as a way of coping, Russell would write letters to him for the rest of his life.

Russell's ashes were buried on a hill overlooking his farm, along with those of his wife and eldest son.

== Legacy ==
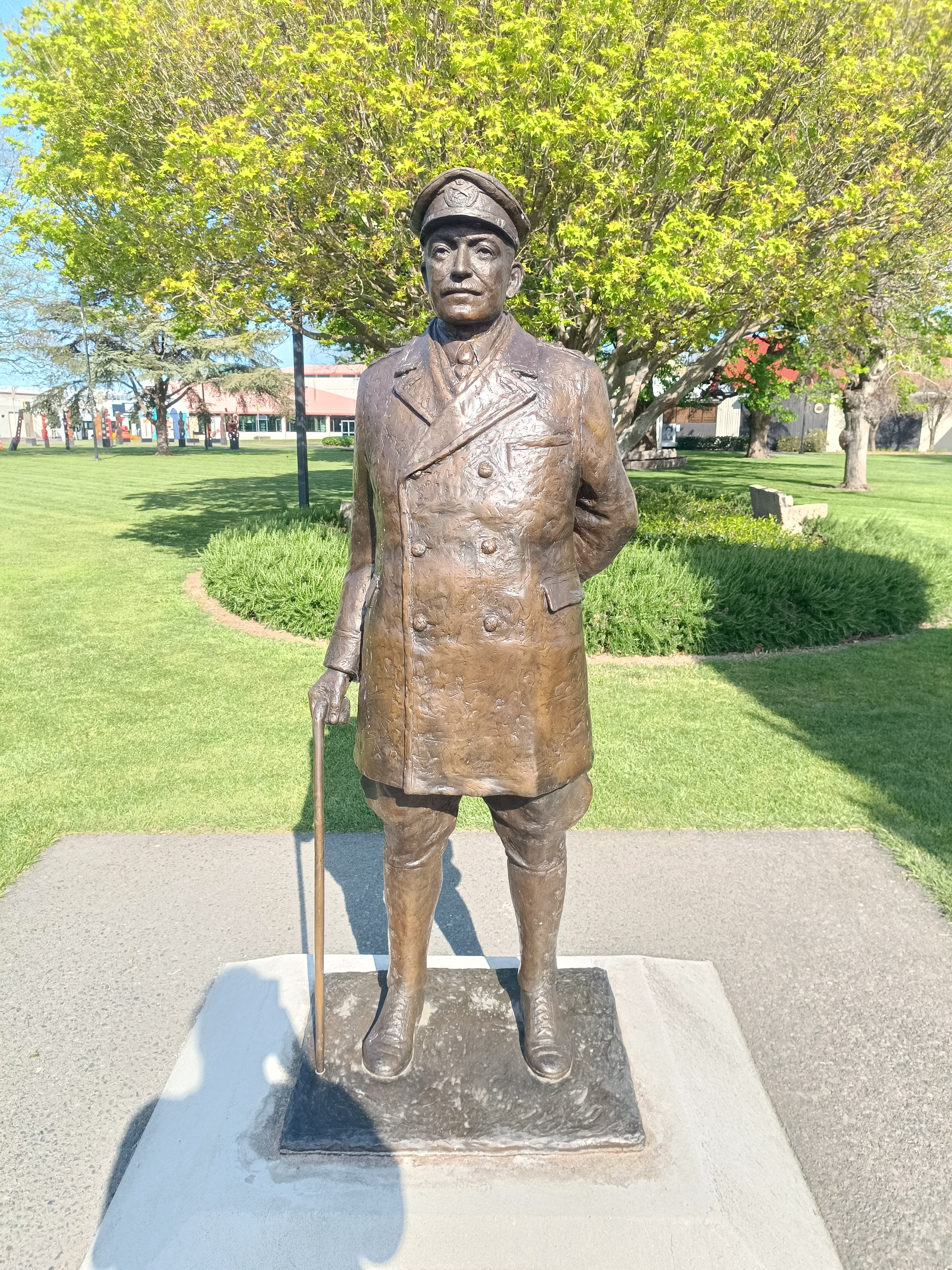
Statue of Russell in Civic Square, Hastings

In 1921, Russell Street in Hastings was renamed from Station Street in honour of Andrew Russell. The street is adjacent the city's war memorial. A bronze statue of him was installed on the street and unveiled on 25 April 2017. A bust of Russell is displayed at the Hastings and District War Memorial Library.
