= Electoral history of Robert Stout =

List of elections featuring Robert Stout as a candidate

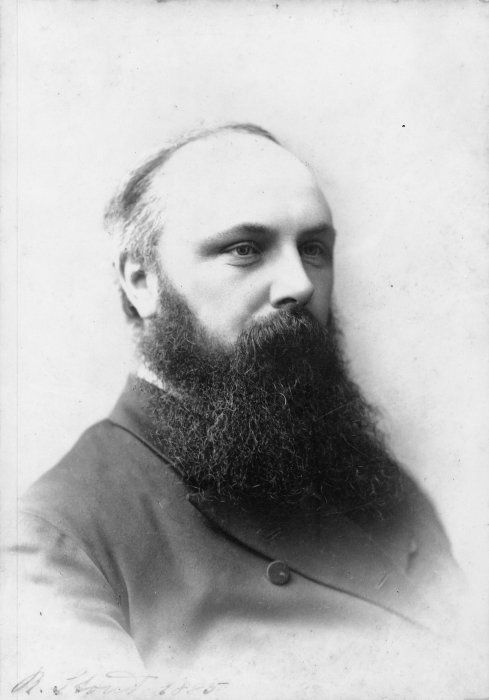
Robert Stout in 1885.

This is a summary of the electoral history of Sir Robert Stout, Prime Minister of New Zealand, (1884–1887).

== Parliamentary elections ==
=== 1875 by-election ===
1875 Caversham by-election
Party	Candidate	Votes	%	±%
Independent	Robert Stout	232	52.37	
Independent	William Larnach	211	47.63	
Majority		11	4.74	
Turnout		443		

=== 1875 election ===
1875 general election: Dunedin
Party	Candidate	Votes	%	±%
Independent	James Macandrew	891	71.22	
Independent	Robert Stout	865	69.14	
Independent	William Larnach	843	67.38	
Independent	William Reynolds	476	38.04	
Independent	James Macassey	409	32.69	
Independent	Henry Fish	238	19.02	
Independent	James Grant	29	2.31	
Turnout		1,251		

=== 1884 election ===
1884 general election: Dunedin East
Party	Candidate	Votes	%	±%
Independent	Robert Stout	755	59.45	
Independent	Matthew Green	515	40.55	
Majority		240	18.89	
Turnout		1,270	70.63	
Registered electors		1,798		

=== 1887 election ===
1887 general election: Dunedin East
Party	Candidate	Votes	%	±%
Independent	James Allen	889	50.82	
Independent	Sir Robert Stout	860	49.18	−10.27
Majority		29	1.65	
Turnout		1,749	78.32	+7.69
Registered electors		2,233		

=== 1893 by-election ===
1893 Inangahua by-election
Party	Candidate	Votes	%	±%
Liberal	Robert Stout	1,899	70.67	
Liberal	Patrick O'Regan	788	29.33	
Majority		611	41.36	
Turnout		2,687		

=== 1893 election ===
1893 New Zealand general election: Wellington
Party	Candidate	Votes	%	±%
Liberal	Robert Stout	6,218	46.73	
Conservative	Francis Bell	5,773	43.39	
Conservative	John Duthie	4,840	36.37	
Liberal	Kennedy Macdonald	3,863	29.03	
Liberal	Francis Fraser	3,729	28.02	
Independent	Harry Vogel	3,606	27.10	
Liberal	William McLean	3,438	25.84	
Liberal	George Fisher	2,385	17.92	
Independent	Thomas Dwan	1,157	8.70	
Independent	William Travers	1,093	8.21	
Majority		977		
Informal votes		147		
Total votes		36,249		
Turnout		13,306	80.66	
Registered electors		16,497		

=== 1896 election ===
1896 New Zealand general election: Wellington
Party	Candidate	Votes	%	±%
Liberal–Labour	John Hutcheson	6,410	48.68	
Independent	Robert Stout	6,305	47.88	
Liberal	George Fisher	5,858	44.49	
Conservative	Arthur Atkinson	5,830	44.27	
Liberal	Charles Wilson	5,569	42.29	
Conservative	Stuart Menteath	5,559	42.22	
Liberal	Francis Fraser	1,811	13.75	
Independent	Justinian John Kivern Powell	185	1.40	
Liberal	Arthur Warburton	91	0.69	
Majority		28	0.21	
Total votes		37,618		
Turnout		13,168	68.21	
Registered electors		19,304		

== Bibliography ==
- McRobie, Alan (1989). Electoral Atlas of New Zealand. Wellington: GP Books. ISBN 0-477-01384-8.
