= 13th New Zealand Parliament =

Term of the Parliament of New Zealand

13th Parliament of New Zealand
←	12th Parliament	14th Parliament	→

Overview
- Legislative body: New Zealand Parliament
- Term: 6 April 1897 – 23 October 1899
- Election: 1896 New Zealand general election
- Government: Liberal Government

House of Representatives
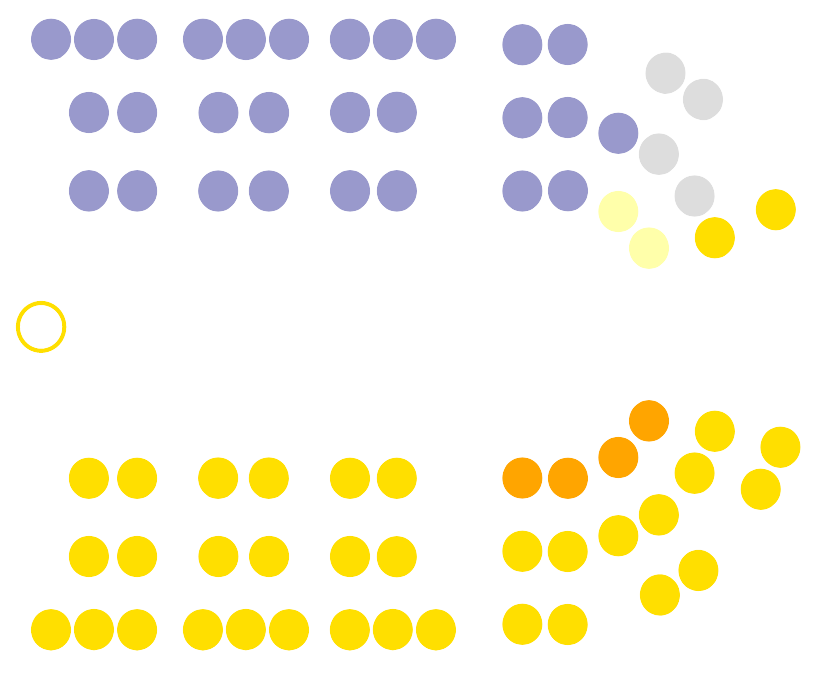
- Members: 74
- Speaker of the House: Maurice O'Rorke
- Premier: Richard Seddon
- Leader of the Opposition: William Russell

Legislative Council
- Members: 47 (at start); 46 (at end)
- Speaker of the Council: Henry Miller

Sovereign
- Monarch: HM Victoria
- Governor: HE Rt. Hon. The Earl of Ranfurly

The 13th New Zealand Parliament was a term of the New Zealand Parliament. It was elected at the 1896 general election in December of that year.

== 1896 general election ==
The 1896 general election was held on Wednesday, 4 December in the general electorates and on Thursday, 19 December in the Māori electorates, respectively. In the 1896 electoral redistribution, rapid population growth in the North Island required the transfer of three seats from the South Island to the north. Four electorates that previously existed were re-established (Geraldine, Manawatu, Motueka, and Taranaki), and three electorates were established for the first time (Ohinemuri, Hawera, and Pahiatua). A total of 74 MPs were elected; 34 represented North Island electorates, 36 represented South Island electorates, and the remaining four represented Māori electorates. 337,024 voters were enrolled and the official turnout at the election was 76.1%.

== Sessions ==
The 13th Parliament sat for four sessions (there were two sessions in 1897), and was prorogued on 15 November 1899.

Session	Opened	Adjourned
first	6 April 1897	10 April 1897
second	23 September 1897	22 December 1897
third	24 June 1898	6 November 1898
fourth	23 June 1899	24 October 1899

== Overview of seats ==
Affiliation	Members	
Affiliation	At election	At dissolution
Liberal	37	35
Liberal–Labour	4	4
Government total	41	39
Conservative	27	29
Independent	4	4
Independent Liberal	2	2
Opposition total	33	35
Total	74	74
Working government majority	8	4

== Ministries ==
The Liberal Government of New Zealand had taken office on 24 January 1891. The Seddon Ministry under Richard Seddon had taken office in 1893 during the term of the 11th Parliament. The Seddon Ministry remained in power for the whole term of this Parliament and held power until Seddon's death on 10 June 1906.

== Initial composition of the 13th Parliament ==
The table below shows the results of the 1896 general election:

Key

Liberal Conservative Independent Liberal Liberal–Labour Independent

Electorate results for the 1896 New Zealand general election
Electorate	Incumbent	Winner	Majority	Runner up
General electorates
Ashburton	John McLachlan	Edward George Wright	242	John McLachlan
Ashley	Richard Meredith		372	Henry Fear Reece
Auckland, City of	Thomas Thompson		2,516	Arthur Rosser
Auckland, City of	Charles Button	James Job Holland	1,622	Arthur Rosser
Auckland, City of	William Crowther		1,328	Arthur Rosser
Avon	William Tanner		457	George McIntyre
Awarua	Joseph Ward		783	Cuthbert Cowan
Bay of Islands	Robert Houston		627	John Press
Bay of Plenty	William Kelly	William Herries	132	William Kelly
Bruce	James Allen		1,059	William Auld
Buller	Roderick McKenzie	Patrick O'Regan	292	James Colvin
Caversham	Arthur Morrison		1,178	Thomas Sidey
Christchurch, City of	Charles Lewis		6,570	William Whitehouse Collins
Christchurch, City of	George Smith		5,940	William Whitehouse Collins
Christchurch, City of	William Whitehouse Collins	Tommy Taylor	5,445	William Whitehouse Collins
Clutha	Thomas Mackenzie	James Thomson	903	John Edie
Dunedin, City of	William Hutchison	Scobie Mackenzie	2,132	David Pinkerton
Dunedin, City of	David Pinkerton	John A. Millar	547	David Pinkerton
Dunedin, City of	William Earnshaw	Henry Fish	378	David Pinkerton
Eden	Edwin Mitchelson	John Bollard	214	Jackson Palmer
Egmont	Felix McGuire	Walter Symes	270	William Monkhouse
Ellesmere	William Montgomery Jr.		564	Frederick Arthur Anson
Franklin	Benjamin Harris	William Massey	474	Benjamin Harris
Geraldine	New electorate	Frederick Flatman	211	Arthur Rhodes
Grey	Arthur Guinness		1,777	Robert Francis Bell
Hawera	New electorate	Felix McGuire	36	Benjamin Robbins
Hawke's Bay	William Russell		833	Alfred Fraser
Invercargill	James Whyte Kelly		578	John Sinclair
Kaiapoi	David Buddo	Richard Moore	259	David Buddo
Lyttelton	New electorate	John Joyce	446	William Jacques
Manawatu	New electorate	John Stevens	71	Robert Bruce
Manukau	Maurice O'Rorke		215	Frank Buckland
Masterton	Alexander Hogg		263	Donald John Cameron
Marsden	Robert Thompson (Note: Robert Thompson was regarded as Liberal in the previous Parliament)		402	Alfred H Mason
Mataura	Robert McNab	George Richardson	201	Robert McNab
Motueka	New electorate	Roderick McKenzie	126	Richmond Hursthouse
Napier	Samuel Carnell	Douglas Maclean	747	Samuel Carnell
Nelson	John Graham		343	Jesse Piper
Oamaru	Thomas Duncan		771	James Dickson Sievwright
Ohinemuri	New electorate	Alfred Cadman	2,037	Edwin Edwards
Otaki	James Wilson	Henry Augustus Field	408	Alfred Newman
Pahiatua	New electorate	John O'Meara	30	Robert Manisty
Palmerston	Frederick Pirani (Note: Frederick Pirani was regarded as Liberal in the previous Parliament)		50	David Buick
Parnell	Frank Lawry		470	Samuel Vaile
Patea	George Hutchison		605	Arthur Remington
Rangitikei	John Stevens	Frank Lethbridge	271	Walter A L Bailey
Riccarton	George Warren Russell	William Rolleston	391	George Warren Russell (Note: George Warren Russell distanced himself from the Liberal Party and, together with Frederick Pirani, unsuccessfully tried to form the Radical Party)
Selwyn	Alfred Saunders	Cathcart Wason	182	Alfred Saunders
Taieri	Walter Carncross		554	John Graham
Taranaki	New electorate	Henry Brown	97	Edward Smith
Thames	James McGowan		323	Edmund Taylor
Timaru	William Hall-Jones		640	Francis Henry Smith
Tuapeka	William Larnach		21	Charles Rawlins
Waiapu	James Carroll		368	Cecil Fitzroy
Waihemo	John McKenzie		554	John Duncan
Waikato	Alfred Cadman	Frederic Lang	1,012	Edward Walker
Waipawa	Charles Hall	George Hunter	211	Charles Hall
Waikouaiti	James Green	Edmund Allen	761	John J Ramsay
Wairarapa	Walter Clarke Buchanan		333	J. T. Marryat Hornsby
Wairau	Lindsay Buick	Charles H. Mills	58	Lindsay Buick (Note: Lindsay Buick distanced himself from the Liberal Party and became an Independent Liberal-Labour candidate)
Waitaki	William Steward		999	Duncan Sutherland
Waitemata	William Massey	Richard Monk	171	Heathcote Jackman
Wakatipu	William Fraser		335	James George
Wallace	James Mackintosh	Michael Gilfedder	116	Rev. Thomas Neave
Wanganui	Archibald Willis	Gilbert Carson	84	Archibald Willis
Wellington, City of	Robert Stout	Robert Stout (Note: Robert Stout was regarded as Liberal in the previous Parliament)	475	Arthur Atkinson
Wellington, City of	Francis Bell	John Hutcheson	580	Arthur Atkinson
Wellington, City of	John Duthie	George Fisher	28	Arthur Atkinson
Wellington Suburbs	Alfred Newman	Thomas Wilford	252	Thomas William Hislop
Westland	Richard Seddon		1,883	Joseph Grimmond
Māori electorates
Eastern Maori	Wi Pere		1,744	Tamati Tautuhi
Northern Maori	Hone Heke		1,316	Eparaima Te Mutu Kapa
Southern Maori	Tame Parata		113	Thomas Ellison (Note: The affiliation of Thomas Ellison, who is listed in most contemporary sources under his Māori name Tame Rangiwahia Erihana, is not known)
Western Maori	Ropata Te Ao	Henare Kaihau	731	Ropata Te Ao

Table footnotes:

== By-elections during 13th Parliament ==
There were a number of changes during the term of the 13th Parliament.

Electorate and by-election		Date	Incumbent	Cause	Winner
Suburbs of Wellington	1897	23 April	Thomas Wilford	Election declared void	Charles Wilson
Awarua	1897	5 August	Sir Joseph Ward	Bankruptcy	Sir Joseph Ward
City of Dunedin	1897	13 October	Henry Fish	Death	Alexander Sligo
City of Wellington	1898	9 March	Sir Robert Stout	Resignation	John Duthie
Mataura	1898	26 May	George Richardson	Bankruptcy	Robert McNab
Tuapeka	1898	2 November	William Larnach	Death	Charles Rawlins
City of Wellington	1899	25 July	John Hutcheson	Resignation	John Hutcheson
