= 1905 City of Wellington by-election =

New Zealand by-election

- 6 April 1905
- Turnout: 11,154
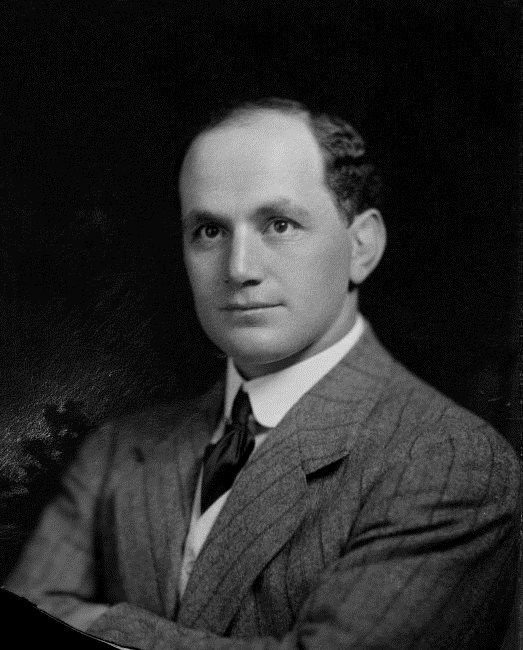

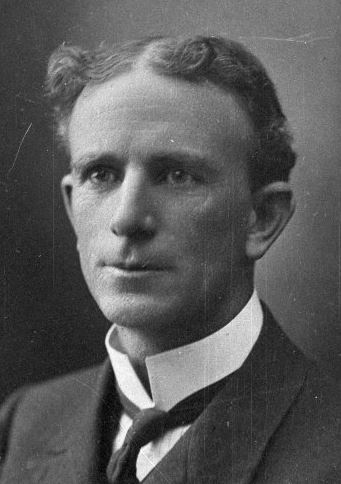

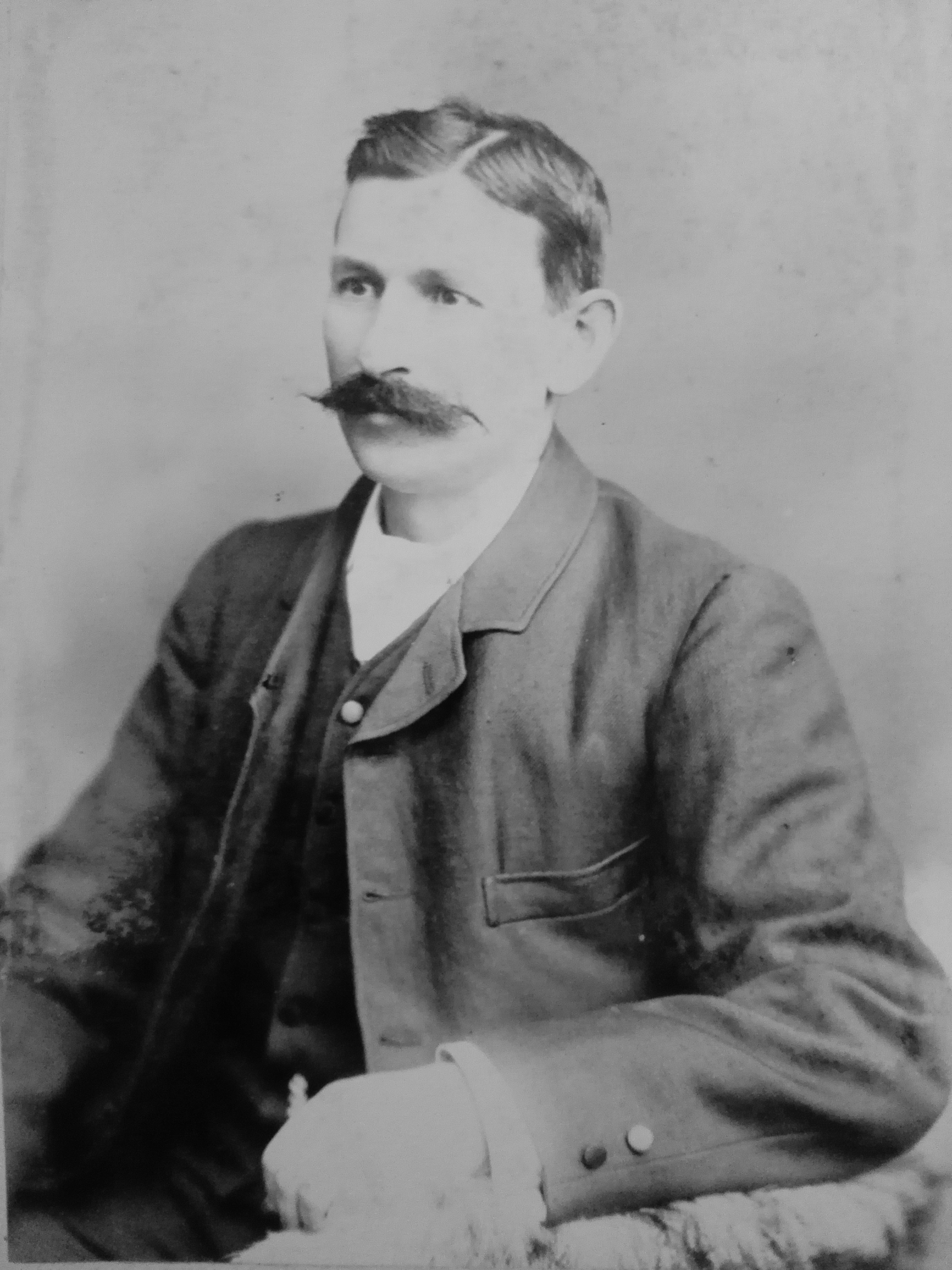
Candidate	Frank Fisher	Charlie Izard	John Hutcheson
Party	Independent Liberal	Liberal	Liberal–Labour
Popular vote	4,692	3,441	3,021
Percentage	42.06	30.84	11.21
Member before election
George Fisher
Liberal
Elected Member
Frank Fisher
Independent Liberal

The 1905 City of Wellington by-election was a by-election in the New Zealand electorate of City of Wellington, a multi-member urban seat at the bottom of the North Island.

The by-election was held on 6 April 1905, and was precipitated by the death of sitting Liberal member of parliament George Fisher.

The by-election was won by Fisher's son Frank Fisher who stood as an Independent Liberal. Fisher beat Charlie Izard and John Hutcheson. Izard would be successful in the Wellington North electorate in the 1905 election later in the year, and Hutcheson had previously represented the electorate.

== Results ==
The following table gives the election results:

1905 City of Wellington by-election
Party	Candidate	Votes	%	±%
Independent Liberal	Frank Fisher	4,692	42.06	
Liberal	Charlie Izard	3,441	30.84	
Liberal–Labour	John Hutcheson	3,021	27.08	
Majority		1,251	11.21	
Turnout		11,154		
Independent Liberal gain from Liberal		Swing		

Fisher would represent the electorate until his defeat at the 1914 election.
