= 1898 City of Wellington by-election =

New Zealand by-election

1898 Wellington by-election
- 9 March 1898
- Turnout: 13,537 (77.26%)
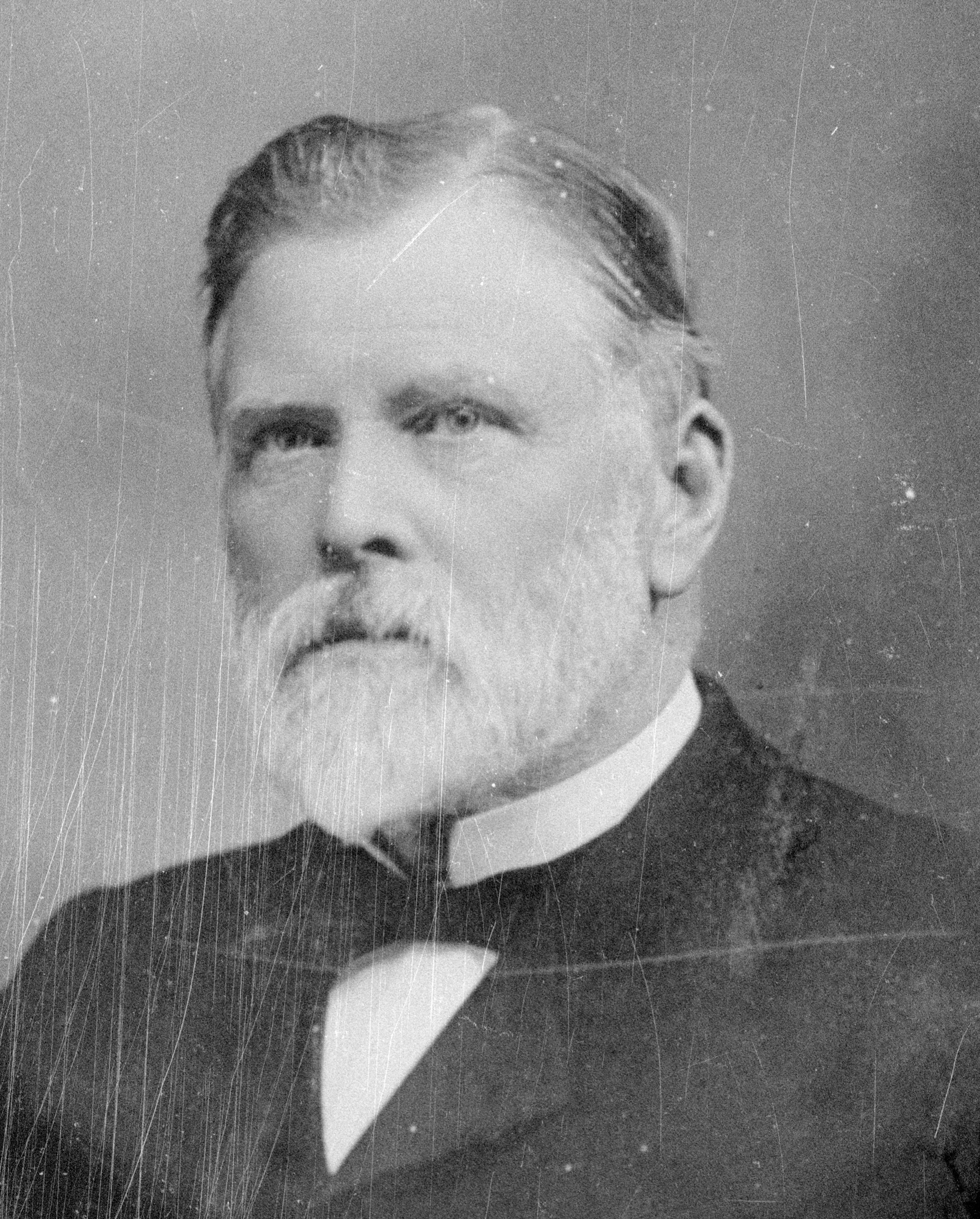

Candidate	John Duthie	Richard Kirk
Party	Conservative	Liberal
Popular vote	7,283	6,254
Percentage	53.80	46.20
Member before election
Sir Robert Stout
Independent
Elected Member
John Duthie
Conservative

The City of Wellington by-election 1898 was held on 9 March 1898 to decide the next member of parliament for the City of Wellington electorate. The contest was caused by resignation of Sir Robert Stout and was won by former mayor of Wellington John Duthie.

== Candidates ==
=== Government ===
A series of ballots were held by the Wellington Trades and Labour Council among the pro-labour liberal supporters to ensure a labour friendly candidate to join the Liberal Party government caucus. Out of the 20 local trade unions, 15 decided to nominate a prospective candidate to stand in support of the government. Five names were nominated and the top three proceeded to a selection meeting and second ballot at the Trades Hall. At the time of the first ballot, the candidate with the most votes, Richard Clement Kirk who was the Mayor of Petone, was being touted in the press as likely to be the official government nominee.

The five nominees were:

- David Fisher, the president of the Maritime Council and a Petone Borough Councillor
- Francis Fraser, the chairman of the Wellington Harbour Board and former MP for Te Aro
- Alfred Hindmarsh, president of the Wellington branches of both the Federated Seamen's Union and Federated Cooks and Stewards' Union
- Richard Clement Kirk, the sitting Mayor of Petone
- David McLaren, the vice president of the Wellington branch of the New Zealand Workers' Union

At the selection meeting Hindmarsh, Kirk and McLaren spoke to the crowd. It was notable for Hindmarsh's speech which was controversial. He emphasised the necessity for an independent labour voice inside Parliament. He made accusations against the Liberal Prime Minister Richard Seddon, who was in attendance, of using the labour movement as merely an addendum to the Liberal Party, acting dictatorially and doing very little to help working class people in his capacity as Minister of Labour. The speech resonated with many delegates but estranged Hindmarsh from the national leadership of the Federated Seamen's Union who were strong Liberal Party supporters.

A week after the initial ballot, a second ballot of a wider group of union members was held and Kirk was the winner. In addition to winning the support of the labour movement, Kirk was Seddon's own nominee and thus adopted as the official Liberal candidate as well.

Affiliation	Candidate	First ballot		Second ballot	
Affiliation	Candidate	Votes	%	Votes	%
Liberal	Richard Kirk	5	33.33	740	45.42
Liberal-Labour	Alfred Hindmarsh	4	26.66	601	36.89
Liberal-Labour	David McLaren	3	20.00	288	17.67
Liberal-Labour	David Fisher	2	13.33	—N/a	
Liberal	Francis Fraser	1	6.66	—N/a	
Majority		1	6.66	139	8.53
Turnout		15	75.00	1,629	—N/a

=== Opposition ===
Several names were speculated in the media as candidates to stand in opposition to the Liberal Government, though the need to coalesce around just one was though crucial to success. The names included:

- Arthur Atkinson, runner-up candidate for the seat in 1896
- Francis Bell, former MP for City of Wellington and Mayor of Wellington
- John Duthie, former MP for City of Wellington
- Stuart Menteath, former MP for Te Aro

In a display of unity, Bell led a deputation to request that Duthie accept nomination for the seat. Duthie accepted the nomination.

=== Others ===
Captain Jackson Barry announced himself as an Independent Liberal candidate by climbing on to a lorry near Queen's Wharf to address a group of working men. He highlighted his experience and his record as Mayor of Cromwell to the audience, though was met with little enthusiasm with only a few indicating their support. Barry ultimately did not contest the seat. Some papers mused that Barry did not believe for a moment that would be nominated and it was merely an act for notoriety and would have been bound to forfeit his £10 deposit.

== Results ==
The following table gives the election results:

1898 City of Wellington by-election
Party	Candidate	Votes	%	±%
Conservative	John Duthie	7,283	53.80	
Liberal	Richard Kirk	6,254	46.20	
Majority		1,029	7.60	
Turnout		13,537	77.26	
Registered electors		17,522		

== See also ==
1899 City of Wellington by-election
