= Frank Fisher (politician) =

New Zealand politician and tennis player (1877–1960)

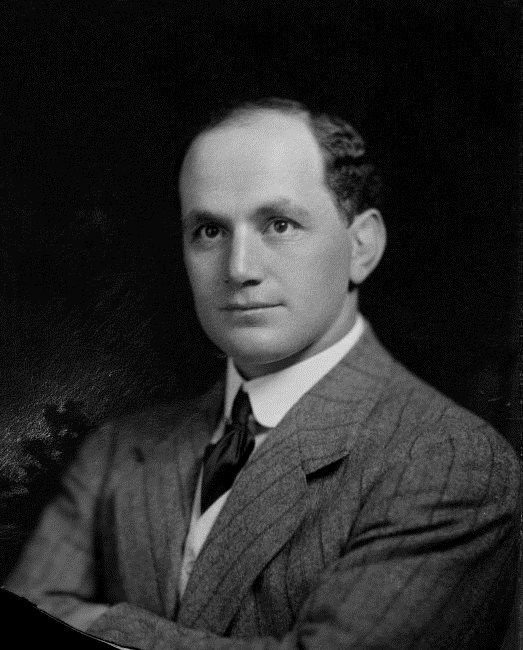
- Full name: Francis Marion Bates Fisher
- Country (sports): New Zealand
- Born: 22 December 1877 Wellington, New Zealand
- Died: 24 July 1960 (aged 82)
- Plays: Left-handed

Grand Slam singles results
- Australian Open: F (1906)
- French Open: 2R (1927)
- Wimbledon: 2R (1919, 1920, 1922, 1923)

Other tournaments
- WCCC: 3R – Singles (1920) F – Doubles (1920)

Doubles
- Career titles: Champion – WCCC Mixed Doubles (1920)

Grand Slam doubles results
- Australian Open: SF (1912)
- Wimbledon: SF (1919)

Grand Slam mixed doubles results
- Wimbledon: QF (1921)

Team competitions
- Davis Cup: 2R^{Eu} (1924)

Francis Marion Bates Fisher (22 December 1877 – 24 July 1960) was a New Zealand Member of Parliament from Wellington. He was known as Rainbow Fisher for his frequent changes of political allegiance. He was a veteran of the Boer War and an internationally successful tennis player becoming the champion, along with his mixed doubles partner, Irene Peacock, of the World Covered Court Championships in 1920.

== Early life and family ==
Fisher was the son of George Fisher, a member of parliament and Mayor of Wellington. David Fisher was his uncle. Frank Fisher was a captain in the 10th New Zealand Contingent to the South African Second Boer War in 1902. His eldest daughter, Esther Fisher (1900–1999), became an international pianist.

== Member of Parliament ==
New Zealand Parliament
Years	Term	Electorate	Party
1905	15th	City of Wellington	Independent Liberal
1905	Changed allegiance to:		New Liberal
1905–1908	16th	Wellington Central	New Liberal
1908–1910	17th	Wellington Central	Independent
1910–1911	Changed allegiance to:		Reform
1911–1914	18th	Wellington Central	Reform

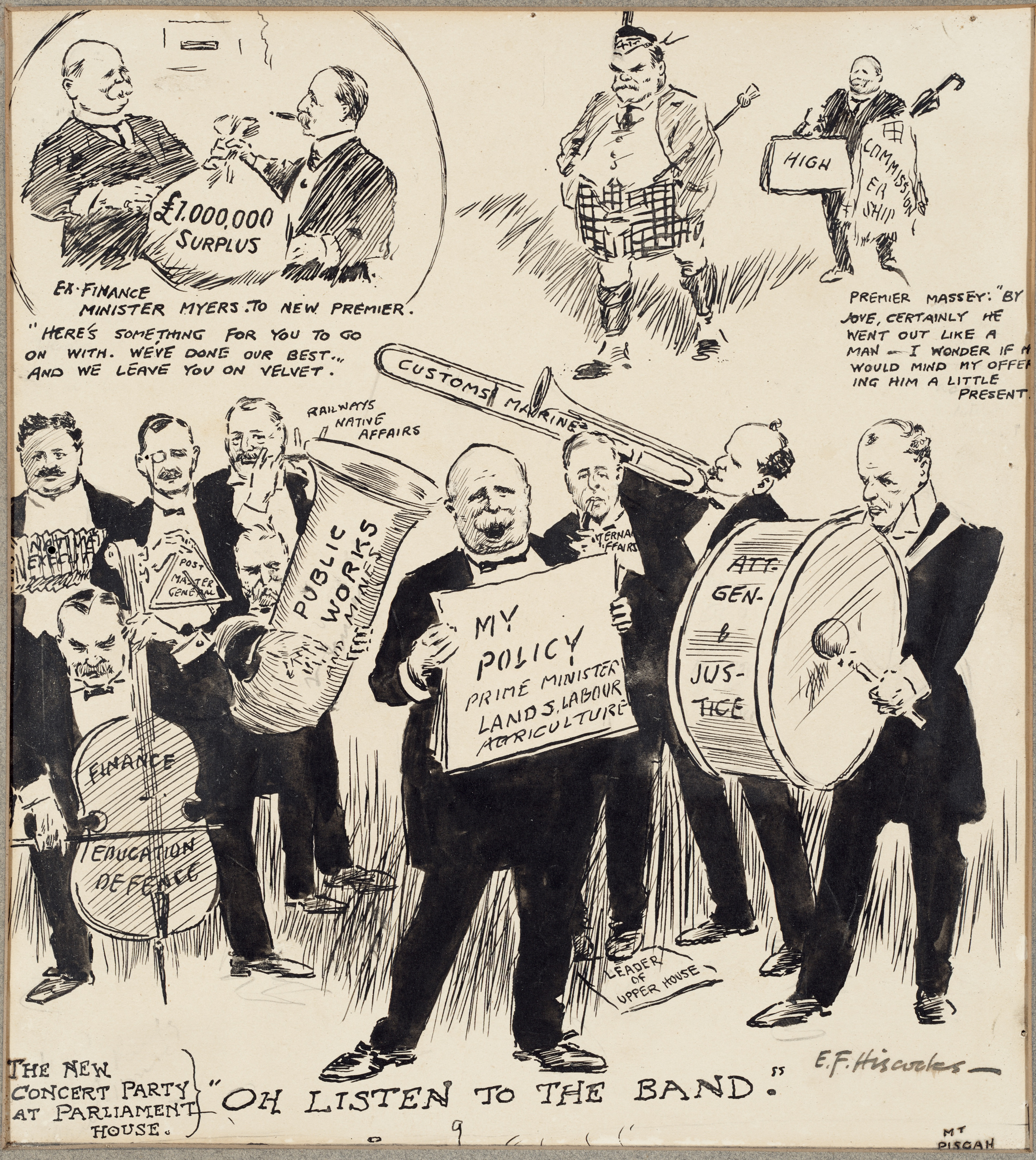
1912 cartoon about the Massey Government, with Fisher playing the trombone

Fisher represented two Wellington electorates in the New Zealand House of Representatives for nine years from a 1905 by-election to the 1914 general election. Initially from 6 April 1905 he represented the multi-member City of Wellington electorate, but from the 1905 general election, he represented Wellington Central.

His initial intention in early 1905 was to stand in a Christchurch electorate at the 1905 general election. In mid February 1905, he held his first meeting with electors in Christchurch. This changed, however, when his father died in mid March, and a request was put to him to stand in the City of Wellington electorate to fill the vacancy. In his speeches to Wellington electors, he stressed the need for the Liberal Party, of which he was a member, to reform itself from within. The by-election was contested by Fisher, Charles Hayward Izard and John Hutcheson, with Fisher being successful.

After his election, he helped form the New Liberal Party. The party was formed at a meeting in the Christchurch suburb of Papanui in June 1905. The New Liberals suffered considerable damage from the so-called "voucher incident", in which Fisher alleged that Richard Seddon's son had been received payment from a government department for work he had not done. The allegations were disproven, and the New Liberals suffered considerable public backlash. Fisher had not consulted his colleagues before making the accusation, and it also strained relations between party members. Fisher was the only New Liberal MP (out of three) re-elected in 1905. The New Liberal Party was defunct by 1908.

In the 1908 general election he stood as an independent. By 1910, he had joined the Reform Party. The 1911 general election required a second ballot if no candidate could achieve an absolute majority in the first round. The election was contested by Fisher, Robert Fletcher (Liberal Party), W. S. Young (Labour Party) and F. Freeman (Socialist Party), with Fisher having a majority of one vote over Fletcher. In the second ballot a week later, Fisher beat Fletcher with a majority of 150 votes. By the next general election in 1914, the incumbent Fisher as a government minister contested Wellington Central against Fletcher again, and he was decisively beaten by 2677 votes to 4910. This spelled an end to Fisher's political career in New Zealand. After the war, in 1919, he stood as the Conservative candidate in the Widnes by-election in Lancashire, England, where he was defeated by Labour's Arthur Henderson.

He was known as Rainbow Fisher because of his frequent changes of political colour. Fisher was Minister of Customs and Minister of Marine from 10 July 1912 to 7 January 1915 in the Reform Government.

== Tennis ==
A top New Zealand tennis player, both at home and abroad, Fisher reached the final of the Australasian Open in 1906 but was defeated by Anthony Wilding. He won the New Zealand Men's Championship Doubles in 1901–02, 1902–03, 1909–10 and 1910–11, and the Mixed Doubles Championships in 1899–1900, 1900–01, 1901–02 and 1911–12. He reached the semi-finals in doubles with partner Stanley Doust at the 1912 Australasian Championships. In doubles he partnered with Major Ritchie to reach the semi-finals at Wimbledon in 1919 and with Alfred Beamish for runner-up at the 1920 World Covered Court Championships [WCCC]. In mixed doubles he partnered Irene Peacock to the Championship of the 1920 WCCC and to the quarter-finals of Wimbledon in 1921.

== Death ==
Fisher died on 24 July 1960 and was buried at Kauae Cemetery in Ngongotahā.

New Zealand Parliament
Preceded by George Fisher, John Duthie, John Aitken	Member of Parliament for Wellington; 1905; Served alongside: John Duthie, John Aitken	Constituency abolished
New constituency	Member of Parliament for Wellington Central; 1905–1914	Succeeded by Robert Fletcher
