= Wellington (New Zealand electorate) =

Wellington (originally City of Wellington), was a parliamentary electorate in Wellington, New Zealand. It existed from 1853 to 1905 with a break in the 1880s. It was a multi-member electorate. The electorate was represented, over the years, by 24 members of parliament.

== Population centres ==
In December 1887, the House of Representatives voted to reduce its membership from general electorates from 91 to 70. The 1890 electoral redistribution used the same 1886 census data used for the 1887 electoral redistribution. In addition, three-member electorates were introduced in the four main centres. This resulted in a major restructuring of electorates, and Wellington was one of eight electorates to be re-created for the 1890 election.

== History ==
The electorate was one of the original electorates used in the 1853 election for the 1st New Zealand Parliament. During the period until 1871, Wellington was a three-member electorate.

In 1858, Isaac Featherston and William Fitzherbert resigned their seats in Parliament. Featherston apparently wanted to return to England. Instead, he successfully stood for re-election within months. The other person returned in the same by-election was William Barnard Rhodes.

The election for the 3rd Parliament was held on 11 December 1860, with the announcement of the official results on 15 December.

== Members of Parliament ==
Key

Independent Liberal Conservative Liberal–Labour Independent Liberal

=== Three-member electorate (1853–1871) ===
Election	Winner(s)		
1853 election	Charles Clifford	Robert Hart	James Kelham
1855 election	Charles Clifford	Isaac Featherston	William Fitzherbert
1858 by-election	Charles Clifford	Isaac Featherston	William Rhodes
1860 election	William Taylor	Isaac Featherston	William Rhodes
1866 election	William Taylor	Isaac Featherston	Charles Borlase

=== Two-member electorate (1871–1881) ===
Election	Winner(s)	
1871 election	George Hunter	Edward Pearce
1875 election	George Hunter	Edward Pearce
1877 by-election	George Hunter	William Travers
1878 by-election	George Hunter	George Elliott Barton
1879 election	William Hutchison	William Levin
(Electorate abolished 1881–1890)

=== Three-member electorate (1890–1905) ===
From 1881 to 1890, the Wellington electorate was replaced by three separate electorates: Te Aro and Thorndon during the whole nine years, and Wellington South (until 1887) then Wellington East (1887–1890)

Election	Winner(s)		
1890 election	George Fisher	Kennedy Macdonald	John Duthie
1892 by-election	George Fisher	William McLean	John Duthie
1893 election	Francis Bell	Robert Stout	John Duthie
1896 election	George Fisher	Robert Stout	John Hutcheson
1898 by-election	George Fisher	John Duthie	John Hutcheson
1899 by-election	George Fisher	John Duthie	John Hutcheson
1899 election	George Fisher	Arthur Atkinson	John Hutcheson
1902 election	George Fisher	John Duthie	John Aitken
1905 by-election	Francis Fisher	John Duthie	John Aitken
(Electorate abolished 1905; see Wellington Central, Wellington East, and Wellington North)

In 1905 the Wellington electorate was again replaced by three electorates: Wellington Central, Wellington East, and Wellington North. In the 1905 election, all three Wellington incumbents stood in the new electorates, with Fisher and Aitken winning in Central and East respectively, while Duthie lost to Charlie Izard in Wellington North – ending his parliamentary career.

== Election results ==
=== 1905 by-election ===
1905 City of Wellington by-election
Party	Candidate	Votes	%	±%
Independent Liberal	Frank Fisher	4,692	42.06	
Liberal	Charlie Izard	3,441	30.84	
Liberal–Labour	John Hutcheson	3,021	27.08	
Majority		1,251	11.21	
Turnout		11,154		
Independent Liberal gain from Liberal		Swing		

=== 1902 election ===
1902 New Zealand general election
Party	Candidate	Votes	%	±%
Conservative	John Aitken	7,808	55.29	
Conservative	John Duthie	6,886	48.76	
Liberal	George Fisher	6,685	47.34	
Independent Liberal	Patrick O'Regan	6,304	44.64	
Conservative	Arthur Atkinson	6,094	43.15	
Liberal	John Findlay	4,764	33.74	
Liberal	James Godber	1,437	10.18	
Liberal	Edwin Jellicoe	1,384	9.80	
Labour	David McLaren	1,003	7.10	
Informal votes		328		
Majority		381^{1}	2.70	
Total votes		42,365		
Turnout		14,122	66.56	
Registered electors		21,218		

^{1} Majority is difference between lowest winning poll (Fisher: 6,685) and highest losing poll (O'Regan: 6,304)

Participation by gender			%
Female	Turnout	7,312	72.00
Female	Enrolled females	10,155	47.86
Male	Enrolled males	11,063	52.14

=== 1899 election ===
1899 New Zealand general election
Party	Candidate	Votes	%	±%
Liberal–Labour	John Hutcheson	7,436	51.06	+2.38
Conservative	Arthur Atkinson	6,703	46.02	+1.75
Liberal	George Fisher	6,442	44.23	−0.26
Liberal	Kennedy Macdonald	6,320	43.39	
Conservative	Thomas William Hislop	6,297	43.23	
Independent Liberal	Edwin Jellicoe	4,751	32.62	
Liberal	Charles Luke	3,812	26.17	
Independent Liberal	Thomas Carmichael	1,004	6.89	
Liberal–Labour	William Earnshaw	851	5.84	
Independent Liberal	Denton Burnett Duncan	78	0.54	
Majority		122^{1}	0.84	+0.04
Total votes		43,694		
Turnout		14,565	77.17	+8.95
Registered electors		18,874		

^{1} Majority is difference between lowest winning poll (Fisher: 6,442) and highest losing poll (Macdonald: 6,320)

Participation by gender			%
Female	Turnout	7,080	79.30
Female	Enrolled females	8,928	47.30
Male	Enrolled males	9,946	52.70

=== 1899 by-election ===
1899 City of Wellington by-election
Party	Candidate	Votes	%	±%
Liberal–Labour	John Hutcheson	6,945	58.28	
Independent	Edwin Jellicoe	4,971	41.72	
Majority		1,974	16.57	
Turnout		11,916		

=== 1898 by-election ===
1898 City of Wellington by-election
Party	Candidate	Votes	%	±%
Conservative	John Duthie	7,283	53.80	
Liberal	Richard Kirk	6,254	46.20	
Majority		1,029	7.60	
Turnout		13,537	77.26	
Registered electors		17,522		

=== 1896 election ===
1896 New Zealand general election
Party	Candidate	Votes	%	±%
Liberal–Labour	John Hutcheson	6,410	48.68	
Independent	Robert Stout	6,305	47.88	
Liberal	George Fisher	5,858	44.49	
Conservative	Arthur Atkinson	5,830	44.27	
Liberal	Charles Wilson	5,569	42.29	
Conservative	Stuart Menteath	5,559	42.22	
Liberal	Francis Fraser	1,811	13.75	
Independent	Justinian John Kivern Powell	185	1.40	
Liberal	Arthur Warburton	91	0.69	
Majority		28 ^{1}	0.21	
Total votes		37,618		
Turnout		13,168^{2}	68.21	
Registered electors		19,304		

^{1} Majority is difference between lowest winning poll (Fisher: 5,858) and highest losing poll (Atkinson: 5,830)

^{2} Turnout is total number of voters – as voters had three votes each total votes cast was higher (37,618)

=== 1893 election ===
1893 New Zealand general election
Party	Candidate	Votes	%	±%
Liberal	Robert Stout	6,218	46.73	
Conservative	Francis Bell	5,773	43.39	
Conservative	John Duthie	4,840	36.37	
Liberal	Kennedy Macdonald	3,863	29.03	
Liberal	Francis Fraser	3,729	28.02	
Independent	Harry Vogel	3,606	27.10	
Liberal	William McLean	3,438	25.84	
Liberal	George Fisher	2,385	17.92	
Independent	Thomas Dwan	1,157	8.70	
Independent	William Travers	1,093	8.21	
Informal votes		147		
Majority		977^{1}		
Total votes		36,249		
Turnout		13,306 ^{2}	80.66	
Registered electors		16,497		

1893 was the first election in which women could vote (the electoral act giving women the vote was passed ten weeks prior to the election). Electoral returns quantified female enrolment and turnout, and showed women's turnout was higher than men's while women's enrolment was lower.

Participation by gender			%
Female	Turnout	6,146	84.42
Female	Enrolled females	7,280	44.13
Male	Turnout	7,160	77.68
Male	Enrolled males	9,217	55.87

^{1} Majority is difference between lowest winning poll (Duthie – 4,840) and highest losing poll (Mcdonald – 3,863)

^{2} Turnout is total number of voters – as voters had three votes each total votes cast was higher (36,102 valid, and 147 invalid votes)

=== 1892 by-election ===
1892 City of Wellington by-election
Party	Candidate	Votes	%	±%
Liberal	William McLean	3,388	51.08	+30.97
Conservative	Francis Bell	3,245	48.92	+5.31
Majority		143	2.16	−1.32
Turnout		6,633	75.50	+15.49
Registered electors		8,786		

=== 1890 election ===
1890 New Zealand general election
Party	Candidate	Votes	%	±%
Liberal	George Fisher	2,828	53.64	
Conservative	John Duthie	2,779	52.71	
Liberal	Kennedy Macdonald	2,482	47.08	
Conservative	Francis Bell	2,299	43.61	
Liberal	Edwin Jellicoe	1,921	35.98	
Liberal	Francis Fraser	1,755	33.29	
Liberal	William McLean	1,060	20.11	
Liberal	Robert Winter	716	13.58	
Majority		183	3.47	
Total votes		15,816		
Turnout		5,272	60.00	
Registered electors		8,786		

=== 1878 by-election ===
1878 City of Wellington by-election
Party	Candidate	Votes	%	±%
Independent	George Elliott Barton	506	41.04	
Independent	Colonel E. Pearce	463	37.58	
Independent	William Hutchison	263	21.41	
Majority		43	3.49	
Informal votes				
Turnout		1232		
Registered electors				

=== 1877 by-election ===
1877 City of Wellington by-election
Party	Candidate	Votes	%	±%
Independent	William Travers	572	50.00	
Independent	William Hutchison	557	48.69	
Majority		15	1.31	
Informal votes				
Turnout		1129		
Registered electors				

=== 1858 by-election ===
1858 City of Wellington by-election
Party	Candidate	Votes	%	±%
Independent	Isaac Featherston	360		
Independent	William Rhodes	352		
Independent	Jerningham Wakefield	349		
Independent	William Bowler	347		
Majority		3 (Note: Majority is the difference between lowest winning poll (Rhodes: 352) and highest losing poll (Wakefield: 349))		
Total votes		1,408		

Table footnotes

=== 1855 election ===
1855 City of Wellington election
Party	Candidate	Votes	%	±%
Independent	Charles Clifford	290		
Independent	Isaac Featherston	289		
Independent	William Fitzherbert	258		
Independent	Stephen Carkeek	244		
Independent	Robert Hart	238		
Majority		14 (Note: Majority is the difference between lowest winning poll (Fitzherbert: 258) and highest losing poll (Carkeek: 244))		
Total votes		1,319		

Table footnotes
