= 1858 City of Wellington by-election =

New Zealand by-election

The City of Wellington by-election 1858 was a by-election held in the multi-member City of Wellington electorate during the 2nd New Zealand Parliament, on 27 July 1858.

The by-election was caused by the resignation of two of the three incumbent MPs Isaac Featherston and William Fitzherbert, and was won by Featherston and William Rhodes. Featherston resigned in order to return to England, but then decided to remain in New Zealand while Rhodes resigned to contest the Hutt 1858 by-election which he subsequently won. On nomination day (26 July) Featherston, Rhodes, Jerningham Wakefield and William Bowler were nominated, and after a show of hands in favour of Rhodes and Featherston a poll was demanded by Wakefield and Bowler. Featherston and Rhodes were subsequently elected the following day.

== Results ==
1858 City of Wellington by-election
| Party | Candidate | Votes | % | ±% |
|---|---|---|---|---|
| Independent | Isaac Featherston | 360 | | |
| Independent | William Rhodes | 352 | | |
| Independent | Jerningham Wakefield | 349 | | |
| Independent | William Bowler | 347 | | |
| Majority | | 3 (Note: Majority is the difference between lowest winning poll (Rhodes: 352) and highest losing poll (Wakefield: 349)) | | |
| Total votes | | 1,408 | | |

Table footnotes
