= 1899 City of Wellington by-election =

New Zealand by-election

1899 Wellington by-election
- 25 July 1899
- Turnout: 11,916 (77.26%)
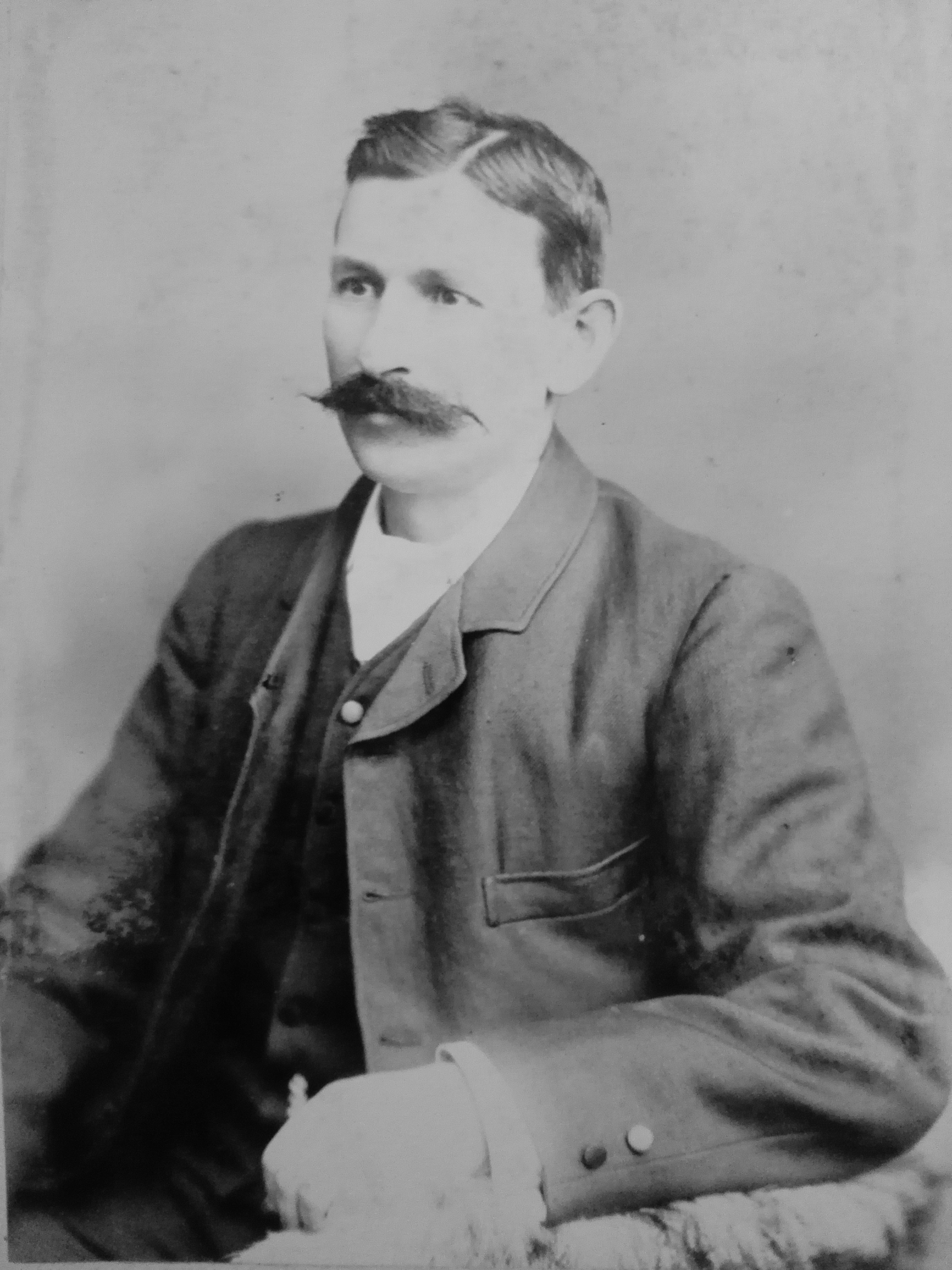

Candidate	John Hutcheson	Edwin Jellicoe
Party	Liberal–Labour	Independent
Popular vote	6,945	4,971
Percentage	58.28	41.72
Member before election
John Hutcheson
Liberal–Labour
Elected Member
John Hutcheson
Liberal–Labour

The 25 July 1899 City of Wellington by-election was caused by the resignation of incumbent MP John Hutcheson over the Marine Scandal. Hutcheson, along with MP Frederick Pirani had accused Premier Richard Seddon and Minister of Marine William Hall-Jones amongst others, of using influence to obtain Mariners certificates for unqualified candidates in contravention of the recent Shipping and Seamen's Act. When the Marine Commission report declared that the charges were unfounded Hutcheson resigned in order to exonerate himself by means of a by-election win.

== Background ==
John Hutcheson, the member for the City of Wellington and a former ship rigger attacked the Premier Richard Seddon and his Minister of Marine William Hall-Jones from the floor of the House of Representatives alleging wrongful use of their ministerial powers when issuing master mariners' certificates. Seddon spent several hours in a witness box refuting the serious charges laid against him and his minister in a trial that played out more like an impeachment of him and his government. Fifteen days of court proceedings, and at the end of the hearing District Judge Ward and Dr Joseph Giles found that the charges against Seddon and Hall-Jones of wrongful use of their ministerial powers were completely unfounded. A 380-page report of the Marine Commission of 1899 upheld their integrity of any wrongdoing.

== Candidates ==
Hutcheson declared on his resignation on 6 July, that he no longer supported Seddon's Liberal government and would stand separate of it as an independent liberal–labour candidate. He asked electors to endorse his shift of allegiance as it contradicted his pledge to voters when he was elected in 1896. Days later Hutcheson clarified he would remain a supporter of the Liberal Party, though an independent supporter of it. Hutcheson was still supported by the labour movement with the Trades Council placed on record, by a large majority, its confidence in him. The conservative opposition decided against standing a candidate in the election, deciding not to run against Hutcheson.

Edwin Jellicoe, a lawyer, stood as an independent candidate though was actually the government candidate. He had stood as a Liberal Party candidate at the 1890 general election.

The names of two other candidates were mentioned in both Justinian Powell and furniture dealer Henry Fielder, however both their candidatures were regarded 'lightly if not jocularly.'

== 1899 by-election result ==
The following table gives the election results:

1899 City of Wellington by-election
Party	Candidate	Votes	%	±%
Liberal–Labour	John Hutcheson	6,945	58.28	
Independent	Edwin Jellicoe	4,971	41.72	
Majority		1,974	16.57	
Turnout		11,916		

== See also ==
1898 City of Wellington by-election
