= John Duthie (politician) =

New Zealand politician

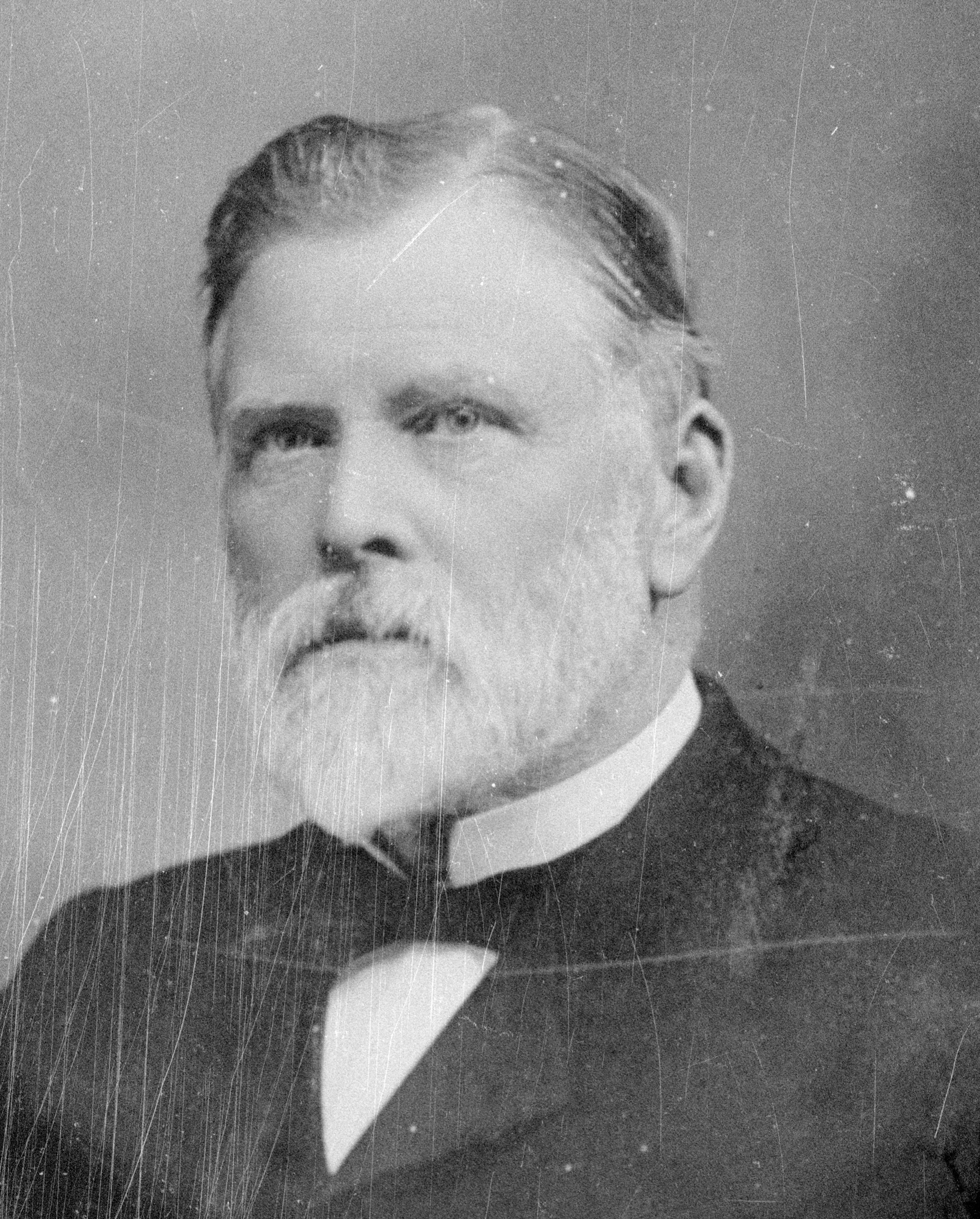
- Portrait of John Duthie in ca 1900

New Zealand Legislative Council
- In office 25 June 1913 – 14 October 1915

Member of the New Zealand Parliament for City of Wellington
- In office 5 December 1890 – 14 November 1896
- In office 9 March 1898 – 15 November 1899
- In office 25 November 1902 – 15 November 1905

9th Mayor of Wellington
- In office 1889–1890

Personal details
- Born: 28 February 1841 Kintore, Aberdeenshire, Scotland
- Died: 14 October 1915 (aged 74)
- Occupation: businessman; politician

John Duthie (28 February 1841 – 14 October 1915) was a politician and businessman in New Zealand. Originally from Scotland, he came to Auckland in 1863. He set up his own ironmongery in New Plymouth, then Wanganui, and he finally settled in Wellington. In the latter city, he was mayor for one term. He then represented Wellington in Parliament for a total of eleven years. For the last two years of his life, he was appointed to the New Zealand Legislative Council.

== Early life ==
Duthie was born on 28 February 1841 in Kintore, Aberdeenshire, Scotland. He was educated at the Aberdeen Grammar School. In that city, he undertook an apprenticeship with Glegg and Thompson, an ironmongery. After his training, Duthie was for some years travelling in Scotland and Ireland for a Sheffield firm.

== Professional life in New Zealand ==
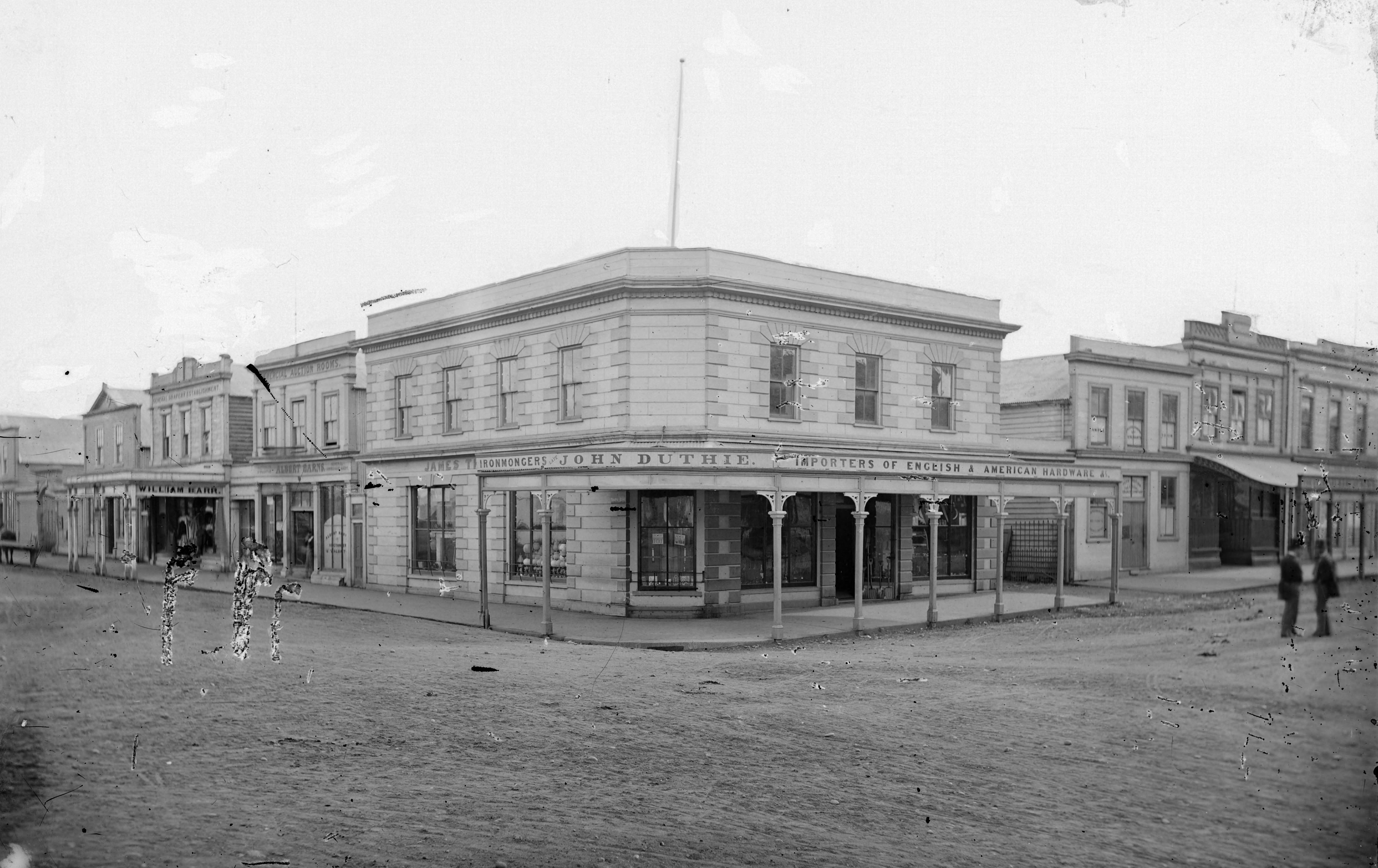
John Duthie's ironmonger shop in Whanganui in the 1870s

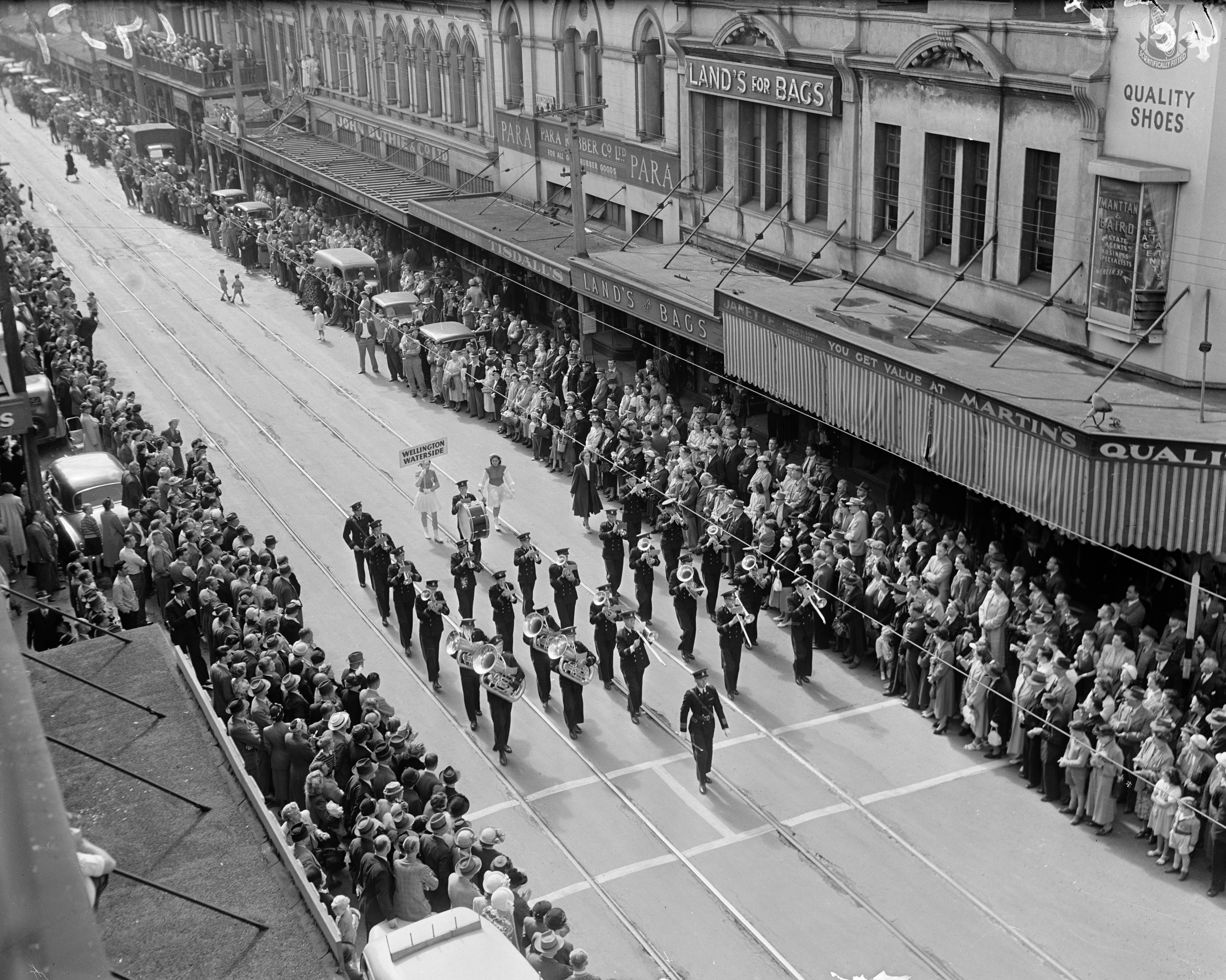
Brass band marching in Willis Street, Wellington, 1951, with the John Duthie shop in the third building from right

Duthie arrived in Auckland, New Zealand, on 16 November 1863 on the Helvellyn. For some time he acted as traveller for Cruickshank, Smart and Co., ironmongers. About 1866 Duthie moved to New Plymouth and started in business; about two years later extending the operations to Wanganui, where he opened a branch and conducted a growing trade for many years. He was for many years in partnership with Charles Brown in New Plymouth. In 1879 he came to Wellington, and started the business that developed into John Duthie and Co. Limited. Until 1887 or 1888, Duthie retained an interest in the Wanganui business, which he then sold to his partner, James Thain.

He was the director of several city companies, and was in business with James Gear in the 1880s, where he was a director, and for two years served as the chairman of directors. He was at one time president of the Wellington Chamber of Commerce, and was president of the Caledonian Society for some years. Duthie was one of the founding directors of The Dominion newspaper and was chairman of the newspaper's board from 1912 until his death in 1915. That newspaper merged in 2002 with the other Wellington daily, The Evening Post, to form The Dominion Post.

== Political career ==
New Zealand Parliament
Years	Term	Electorate	Party
1890–1893	11th	City of Wellington	Independent
1893–1896	12th	City of Wellington	Independent
1898–1899	13th	City of Wellington	Independent
1902–1905	15th	City of Wellington	Independent

While a resident of Wanganui, he was at one time chairman of the Harbour Board. In Wellington he was a member of the Wellington Harbour Board for many years and was chairman of that body in 1887–1888. In 1889, he was elected Mayor of Wellington without opposition. He held the position for one year.

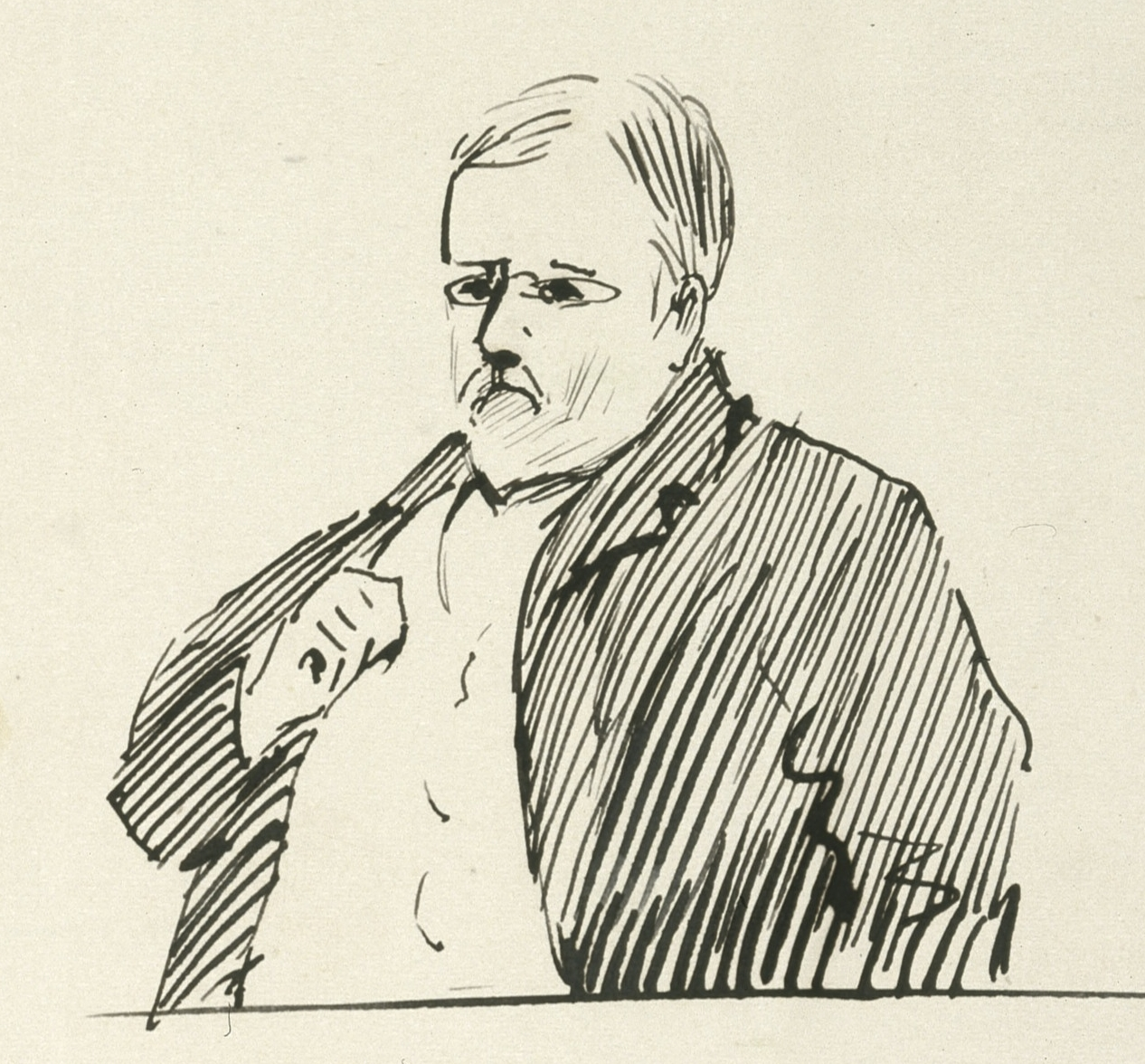
John Duthie caricature, 1896

Duthie, a conservative politician who was never sympathetic to the ideas of the Liberal Party, was first elected to the three-member electorate of City of Wellington in the 1890 general election, when he came second, with 50 votes behind George Fisher, but 300 votes ahead of Kennedy Macdonald. He served until the end of the term of the 11th New Zealand Parliament in 1893. At the 1893 general election, he was again elected for Wellington, coming third alongside Francis Bell (the later Prime Minister) and Robert Stout (the former Prime Minister), but defeating the incumbent Macdonald. Duthie retired at the end of the term of the 12th New Zealand Parliament in 1896 and did not stand in the 1896 general election.

The resignation of Stout triggered the 9 March 1898 City of Wellington by-election. The election was contested by Duthie and Richard Clement Kirk, with the former being successful. Duthie retired at the end of the term of the 13th New Zealand Parliament in 1899 and did not stand in the 1899 general election.

Duthie stood once more in the three-member Wellington electorate in the 1902 general election and came second, and was thus returned alongside John Aitken and George Fisher. He served until the end of the term of the 15th New Zealand Parliament in 1905.

The Wellington electorate was abolished in 1905 and replaced by three single-member electorates. Duthie chose to contest the Wellington North electorate and contested it against Charles Hayward Izard and George Dickson Macfarlane. Izard was successful, with Duthie coming second, and the latter's parliamentary career had thus come to an end.

Duthie was remembered as one of the sternest critics of the Liberal Government under Richard Seddon. Duthie had a very direct manner. He believed strongly that he was right, and that everybody who disagreed with him was wrong.

Under William Massey's Reform Government, Duthie was appointed to the Legislative Council on 26 June 1913 and served until his death.

== Balgownie House ==
The Duthie family lived in Wellington until their new home, Balgownie, was completed in 1903 in the Lower Hutt suburb of Naenae. The house, built entirely from native timbers, was at the time regarded as one of the finest in the Wellington region. It had its own electricity generation plant on the property and is believed to be the first house in the region that had electricity. Since 1984 the house has been a private residence.

Both the house and the generator building are registered by Heritage New Zealand as Category II heritage structures.

== Family and death ==
Duthie married Mary Anne Mercer (born 3 December 1840) in Auckland in 1864.

Three of their daughters died young: Laura (1 September 1875 – 30 March 1876) was buried at Wanganui, while Isabella Miller (15 March 1867 – 12 November 1896; wife of Thomas Miller) and Florence (27 January 1876 – 21 December 1896) were both buried at Karori Cemetery.

His wife died on 8 October 1911 and is buried at Karori Cemetery. Duthie died on 14 October 1915 at his residence Balgownie aged 74 years. He was buried at Karori Cemetery in plot number 85 F two days later, next to his wife. He was survived by one daughter and six sons.

Mercer Street in central Wellington is named in honour of the mayoress. Duthie Street in Karori is named for him, although he never lived in Karori.

== Notes ==
New Zealand Parliament
In abeyance Title last held by William Hutchison, William Levin	Member of Parliament for Wellington; 1890–1896 served alongside: George Fisher, Kennedy Macdonald, William McLean, Francis Bell, Robert Stout 1898–1899 served alongside: George Fisher, John Hutcheson; 1902–1905 served alongside: George Fisher, Francis Fisher, John Aitken	Succeeded by George Fisher, Robert Stout, John Hutcheson
Preceded by George Fisher, Robert Stout, John Hutcheson	Member of Parliament for Wellington; 1890–1896 served alongside: George Fisher, Kennedy Macdonald, William McLean, Francis Bell, Robert Stout 1898–1899 served alongside: George Fisher, John Hutcheson; 1902–1905 served alongside: George Fisher, Francis Fisher, John Aitken	Succeeded by George Fisher, Arthur Atkinson, John Hutcheson
Preceded by George Fisher, Arthur Atkinson (politician, born 1863)	Member of Parliament for Wellington; 1890–1896 served alongside: George Fisher, Kennedy Macdonald, William McLean, Francis Bell, Robert Stout 1898–1899 served alongside: George Fisher, John Hutcheson; 1902–1905 served alongside: George Fisher, Francis Fisher, John Aitken	Constituency abolished
Political offices
Preceded by Samuel Brown	Mayor of Wellington; 1889–1890	Succeeded by Charles Johnston
Preceded by Edward Pearce	Chair of Wellington Harbour Board; 1887–1888	Succeeded by Henry Rose
