= 1877 Wellington mayoral election =

New Zealand local election

- 28 November 1877
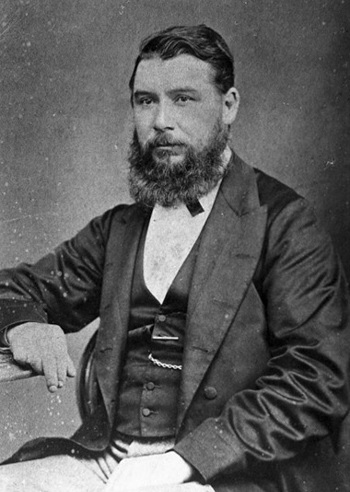

Candidate	Joe Dransfield	George Elliott Barton
Party	Independent	Independent
Popular vote	elected unopposed	withdrew
Mayor before election
William Hutchison
Elected mayor
Joe Dransfield

The 1877 Wellington mayoral election was part of the New Zealand local elections held that same year to decide who would take the office of Mayor of Wellington.

== Background ==
William Hutchison, the incumbent Mayor, initially intended to seek re-election however he later withdrew his candidature. This left a two-way race between former mayor Joe Dransfield and lawyer George Elliott Barton. Barton later retired from election in consequence of being engaged in several legal cases pertaining to the city, meaning that if elected he would have had to appear in court against himself. After Barton's mid-campaign withdrawal Dransfield was then declared elected unopposed and thus cancelled his remaining campaign meetings. It was the second election in a row where the mayoralty was uncontested.
