= Wellington East (New Zealand electorate) =

Wellington East was a parliamentary electorate in the eastern suburbs of Wellington, New Zealand, from 1887 to 1890 and from 1905 to 1946. It was succeeded by the Miramar electorate. The electorate was represented by seven Members of Parliament.

== Population centres ==
In the 1887 electoral redistribution, although the Representation Commission was required through the Representation Act 1887 to maintain existing electorates "as far as possible", rapid population growth in the North Island required the transfer of three seats from the South Island to the north. Ten new electorates were created, including Wellington East, and one former electorate was recreated.

The initial electorate was located east of the suburb of Te Aro and included the suburb of Mount Victoria. The polling booth for the 1887 election was located at the Lyceum Hall in Tory Street.

In December 1887, the House of Representatives voted to reduce its membership from general electorates from 91 to 70. The 1890 electoral redistribution used the same 1886 census data used for the 1887 electoral redistribution. In addition, three-member electorates were introduced in the four main centres. This resulted in a major restructuring of electorates, and Wellington East became part of the City of Wellington electorate.

Through the City Single Electorates Act, 1903, the three-member electorates of the four main centres were split again, and this became effective at the end of the 15th Parliament and was thus used for the 1905 election. The City of Wellington electorate was split into the Wellington East, Wellington Central, and Wellington North electorates.

== History ==
=== Members of Parliament ===
The electorate was represented by seven Members of Parliament:

Key

Independent	Conservative	Ind. Labour League	Reform	Labour

Election	Winner
1887 election	George Fisher
(Electorate abolished 1890–1905, see City of Wellington)
1905 election	John Aitken
1908 election	David McLaren
1911 election	Alfred Newman
1914 election	Alfred Newman
1919 election	Alfred Newman
1922 election	Alec Monteith
1925 election	Thomas Forsyth
1928 election	Bob Semple
1931 election	Bob Semple
1935 election	Bob Semple
1938 election	Bob Semple
1943 election	Bob Semple
(Electorate abolished in 1946, see Miramar)

== Election results ==
=== 1943 election ===
1943 general election: Wellington East
Party	Candidate	Votes	%	±%
Labour	Bob Semple	8,369	55.33	−10.61
National	Len Jacobsen	5,781	38.22	
Democratic Labour	Walter Bishop	1,036	6.85	
People's Movement	Edwin Russell	462	3.05	
Pacifist	Archibald Barrington	252	1.67	
Informal votes		125	0.83	+0.49
Majority		2,588	17.11	−15.36
Turnout		15,125	85.35	−6.14
Registered electors		17,721		

=== 1938 election ===
1938 general election: Wellington East
Party	Candidate	Votes	%	±%
Labour	Bob Semple	9,618	65.94	+12.79
National	William Long Barker	4,882	33.47	
Informal votes		51	0.34	−0.21
Majority		4,736	32.47	+10.96
Turnout		14,585	91.49	+3.30
Registered electors		15,940		

=== 1935 election ===
1935 general election: Wellington East
Party	Candidate	Votes	%	±%
Labour	Bob Semple	8,208	53.15	+1.00
Reform	Ossie Mazengarb	4,885	31.63	
Democrat	William Duncan	1,189	7.69	
Independent	William Gaudin	657	4.25	
Commonwealth Land	Edward William Nicolaus	433	2.80	
Communist	Connie Rawcliffe	70	0.45	
Informal votes		86	0.55	+0.08
Majority		3,323	21.51	+17.30
Turnout		15,442	88.19	+4.99
Registered electors		17,508		

=== 1931 election ===
1931 general election: Wellington East
Party	Candidate	Votes	%	±%
Labour	Bob Semple	7,207	52.15	+8.75
Reform	Thomas Forsyth	6,614	47.85	+12.04
Majority		593	4.29	−3.29
Informal votes		65	0.47	−0.53
Turnout		13,886	83.20	−5.27
Registered electors		16,690		

=== 1928 election ===
1928 general election: Wellington East
Party	Candidate	Votes	%	±%
Labour	Bob Semple	5,527	43.40	
Reform	Thomas Forsyth	4,561	35.81	−19.53
Independent	James John Clark	2,648	20.79	
Majority		966	7.58	−3.10
Informal votes		128	1.00	−0.70
Turnout		12,864	88.47	−0.98
Registered electors		14,541		

=== 1925 election ===
1925 general election: Wellington East
Party	Candidate	Votes	%	±%
Reform	Thomas Forsyth	6,191	55.34	+18.61
Labour	Alec Monteith	4,996	44.66	+3.36
Majority		1,195	10.68	+6.11
Informal votes		193	1.70	+0.72
Turnout		11,380	89.44	−1.43
Registered electors		12,723		

=== 1922 election ===
1922 general election: Wellington East
Party	Candidate	Votes	%	±%
Labour	Alec Monteith	4,274	41.30	
Reform	Thomas Forsyth	3,801	36.73	
Liberal	Thomas William McDonald	1,860	17.97	
Independent	Annie McVicar	414	4.00	
Majority		473	4.57	
Informal votes		102	0.98	
Turnout		10,451	90.88	
Registered electors		11,500		

=== 1919 election ===
1919 general election: Wellington East
Party	Candidate	Votes	%	±%
Reform	Alfred Newman	4,375	42.77	−7.52
Labour	Alec Monteith	3,317	32.43	
Liberal	Len McKenzie	2,441	23.86	
Informal votes		94	0.91	+0.12
Majority		1,058	10.34	+9.75
Turnout		10,227	80.49	−4.23
Registered electors		12,705		

=== 1914 election ===
1914 general election: Wellington East
Party	Candidate	Votes	%	±%
Reform	Alfred Newman	4,062	50.29	−0.03
United Labour	David McLaren	4,014	49.71	+0.26
Informal votes		64	0.79	+0.07
Majority		48	0.59	−0.27
Turnout		8,076	84.72	+11.21
Registered electors		9,532		

=== 1911 election ===
1911 general election: Wellington East, first ballot
Party	Candidate	Votes	%	±%
Reform	Alfred Newman	3,371	43.25	
Labour	David McLaren	2,969	38.09	−15.00
Liberal	Frederick George Bolton	1,242	15.93	
Independent Liberal	John Brodie	132	1.69	
Informal votes		80	1.02	+0.64
Turnout		7,794	76.26	+8.74
Second ballot result
Reform	Alfred Newman	3,780	50.32	+7.07
Labour	David McLaren	3,715	49.45	+11.36
Informal votes		18	0.23	0.79
Majority		65	0.86	+0.22
Turnout		7,513	73.51	−2.75
Registered electors		10,219		

=== 1908 election ===
1908 general election: Wellington East, first ballot
Party	Candidate	Votes	%	±%
Conservative	Arthur Atkinson	2,400	35.30	
Ind. Labour League	David McLaren	1,741	25.61	+12.75
Liberal	William McLean	1,300	19.12	−24.29
Liberal	George Winder	1,071	15.75	
Informal votes		286	4.20	+2.92
Turnout		6,798	70.75	−10.93
Second ballot result
Ind. Labour League	David McLaren	3,446	53.09	+27.48
Conservative	Arthur Atkinson	3,019	46.51	+11.21
Informal votes		25	0.38	3.82
Majority		427	6.57	
Turnout		6,490	67.54	−3.21
Registered electors		9,608		

=== 1905 election ===
1905 general election: Wellington East
Party	Candidate	Votes	%	±%
Conservative	John Aitken	2,595	43.73	
Liberal	William McLean	2,576	43.41	
Ind. Labour League	David McLaren	763	12.86	
Majority		19	0.32	
Informal votes		77	1.28	
Turnout		6,011	81.68	
Registered electors		7,359		
