= Kennedy Macdonald =

New Zealand politician

The Honourable Kennedy Macdonald
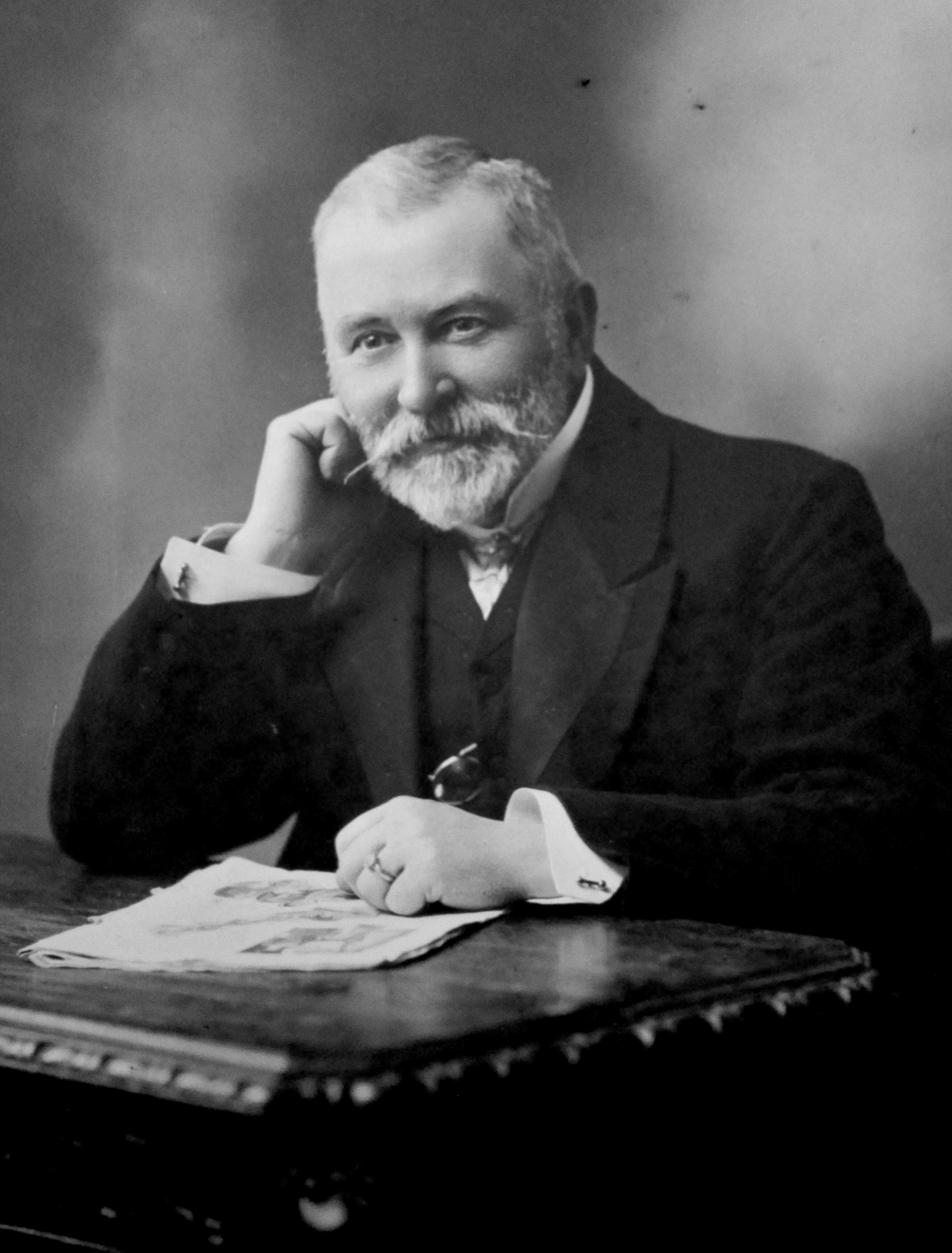

Member of the New Zealand Parliament for City of Wellington
- In office 5 December 1890 – 28 November 1891 Serving with George Fisher & John Duthie
- Succeeded by: William McLean

Personal details
- Born: 6 April 1847 Boulogne-sur-Mer, France
- Died: 17 October 1914 (aged 67) Porirua, New Zealand
- Party: Liberal
- Spouse: Frances Rossiter

Thomas Kennedy Macdonald (6 April 1847 – 17 October 1914), known as Kennedy Macdonald or Kennedy Mac, was a 19th-century Liberal Party Member of Parliament in Wellington, New Zealand.

== Early life ==
Macdonald was born in Boulogne-sur-Mer in northern France. He came to Wellington from Australia in July 1871. Macdonald married Frances Rossiter on 15 November 1870 in Melbourne. They lost three sons within one month in 1876 during a scarlet fever epidemic.

He was a founding member of the New Zealand Academy of Fine Arts in 1882. Almost 100 years later, Inverlochy House, his former residence, was given to the academy.

== Political career ==
New Zealand Parliament
Years	Term	Electorate	Party
1890–1891	11th	City of Wellington	Liberal

MacDonald initially made political impact in local government. He served for seven years as Government representative on the Wellington Harbour Board including 2 years as its chairman. He was also a Wellington City Councillor from 1877 to 1878. In 1899 he stood unsuccessfully for Mayor of Wellington against John Aitken.

He represented the City of Wellington electorate from 1890 to 1891, when he resigned upon a bankruptcy claim. He was in favour of a land tax and of more (rural) roads, and of ending the jobbery in dealing in native land.

He contested the three-member City of Wellington electorate in the 1899 election, when he came fourth. He considered standing in the Otaki by-election in January 1900, but the brother of the deceased incumbent consented to stand for the Liberal Party instead. He was later appointed to the Legislative Council from 1903 to 1911.

== Death ==
Macdonald died on 17 October 1914 at the Porirua Lunatic Asylum where he had resided since November 1913. The Macdonald family is buried at Bolton Street Memorial Park, and their grave is part of the memorial trail.

McDonald Crescent in Wellington is named after him.

== Notes ==
Political offices
Preceded by William Cable	Chair of Wellington Harbour Board; 1906–1908	Succeeded by Thomas Wilford
New Zealand Parliament
In abeyance Title last held by William Hutchison, William Levin	Member of Parliament for Wellington; 1890–1891; Served alongside: George Fisher, John Duthie	Succeeded by William McLean
