= 1878 City of Wellington by-election =

New Zealand by-election

The 1878 City of Wellington by-election was a by-election held in the multi-member City of Wellington electorate during the 6th New Zealand Parliament, on 18 February 1878.

The by-election was caused by the resignation of one of the two incumbent MPs, William Travers, and led to his replacement by George Elliott Barton as a form of protest.

== Results ==
1878 City of Wellington by-election
Party	Candidate	Votes	%	±%
Independent	George Elliott Barton	506	41.04	
Independent	Colonel E. Pearce	463	37.58	
Independent	William Hutchison	263	21.41	
Majority		43	3.49	
Informal votes				
Turnout		1232		
Registered electors				
