= George Elliott Barton =

Australian politician

George Elliott Barton (20 May 1829 – 31 May 1903) was a 19th-century lawyer and practised as a barrister in Dublin (Ireland), Melbourne (Victoria), Dunedin & Wellington (New Zealand), Sydney (New South Wales). He was appointed a judge in Dunedin and Wellington, New Zealand.

== Family life ==
George Barton married Jane Crichton Campbell, eldest daughter of the Rev. Dr. Campbell of London, on 8 April 1854 at Melbourne, Victoria. Their first child, a son, Elliott L'Estrange Barton (solicitor Patea & Hawera; Mayor Hawera), was born 13 July 1856 at South Yarra, Victoria. Their second child, another son, Edward Gustavus Campbell Barton (electrical engineer, Brisbane) was born 11 December 1857 at South Yarra. He died in Paris, France, on 31 May 1903. There appears to have been a daughter Anna who lived to adulthood.

== Professional life ==
=== General ===
An Irish Protestant, he was described as a hot-tempered and an "exciteable Irishman" and was the subject of the "Barton Affair" of 1876-78 when he was imprisoned for a month (lawyers were usually fined) for contempt of court by Chief Justice James Prendergast (who he had probably met in the Victorian goldfields). He was known as "little Barton" to distinguish him from George Burnett Barton or "long Barton" (unrelated) who was also a lawyer and the editor of the Otago Daily Times.

=== Australia ===
Barton was selected to represent the 'working classes' in the district of North Melbourne for the 1859 general election, which he won. He was particularly concerned with introducing the payment of members of parliament.

=== New Zealand ===
He was appointed a judge of the Native Land Court in 1888, but according to Morris resigned and left New Zealand in 1890 following a feud with a fellow judge, dying in Paris in 1903 (although Wilson says he died in 1906).

== Political career ==
New Zealand Parliament
Years	Term	Electorate	Party
1878–1879	6th	City of Wellington	Independent

He stood unsuccessfully in the 1873 by-election for Wakatipu. At the 1877 local elections he stood for Mayor of Wellington. During the campaign, against former mayor Joe Dransfield, Barton decided to withdraw from election in consequence of being engaged in several legal cases pertaining to the city, meaning that if elected he would have had to appear in court against himself.

He was a Member of Parliament, representing the City of Wellington electorate from the 1878 City of Wellington by-election to 1879, when he retired.
