= William McLean (New Zealand politician) =

New Zealand politician (1845–1914)

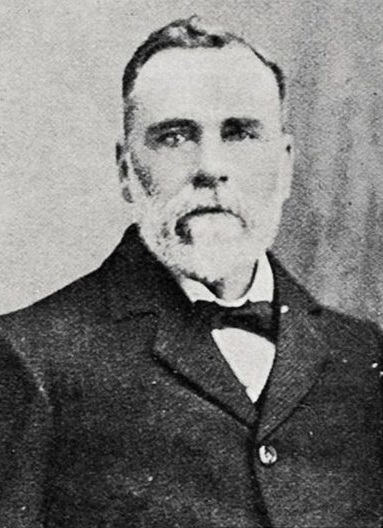

Member of the New Zealand Parliament for City of Wellington
- In office 15 January 1892 – 28 November 1893

Personal details
- Born: 1845 Grantown, Scotland
- Died: 25 August 1914 (aged 68–69)
- Party: Liberal
- Spouse: Mary Elizabeth Crumpton

William McLean (1845 – 25 August 1914) was a 19th-century Liberal Party Member of Parliament in Wellington, New Zealand.

== Early life ==
McLean was born in Grantown, Scotland, in 1845, the youngest son of John McLean, a shoemaker. He was adopted by a parish priest at an early age. Aged 13, he moved to Rochdale to work as a cotton spinner. His employer suspended operations in 1863 in the Lancashire Cotton Famine caused by the American Civil War, and McLean emigrated to New Zealand for the Otago gold rush.

== Life in New Zealand ==
He arrived in Dunedin on the Dauntless and went to the gold fields in Central Otago. He was successful and could open a store in the Bread and Water gully. When word of the West Coast gold rush arrived, he went to Hokitika at once. He broke his arm digging at Lake Kaniere and had to go to Christchurch for medical treatment, as there were no doctors on the West Coast yet. He returned to the West Coast, and then back to Central Otago, before settling in Reefton. For a time, he was a schoolmaster on the West Coast. He erected the second gold mining plant in Reefton, and became an auctioneer and a mining and commission agent.

On 20 April 1877, McLean married Mary Elizabeth Crumpton, the daughter of Thomas Crumpton. The Crumptons were from Charleston on the West Coast.

He moved to Wellington in 1884, where he was an auctioneer at first. For a few years following, he was secretary for the Wellington Loan Company, and afterwards secretary for the Empire Loan and Discount Company.

== Political career ==
New Zealand Parliament
| Years | Term | Electorate | Party |
|---|---|---|---|
| 1892–1893 | 11th | City of Wellington | Liberal |

McLean was one of three candidates in the Inangahua electorate in the 1881 election, but came last with just 3% of the vote.

McLean contested the Thorndon electorate in the 1887 election, but was beaten by Alfred Newman. He unsuccessfully contested the three-member Wellington electorate in the 1890 election, where he came seventh.

He represented the City of Wellington electorate from an 1892 by-election to the 1893 general election, when he was defeated. In 1892, he narrowly defeated the later Prime Minister Francis Bell by 3388 votes to 3245.

McLean contested the Wellington East electorate in the 1905 election and came a very close second to John Aitken, with just 19 votes (0.32%) between them. He contested the Wellington East electorate again in 1908, but the Liberal vote was split by another Liberal candidate, George Winder. In the first ballot, both Liberal candidates were eliminated. This left the Independent Political Labour League (IPLL) candidate, David McLaren, face a conservative candidate and with many Liberal voters transferring their allegiance to McLaren, he became the only candidate of the IPLL who was ever elected to the House of Representatives.

== Later life ==
In 1898, McLean imported two Benz cars from Paris; they were believed to be the first motor vehicles in New Zealand. Parliament passed the McLean Motor-car Act, setting out the rules under which McLean and others could operate cars.

McLean was one of the promoters of the Wellington Opera House. For some years, he was secretary of the company that owned the Opera House. He believed in oil being available in commercially viable quantities in Taranaki, and went to America to purchase a plant for oil extraction. It was many decades later before viable quantities were found.

McLean's wife died on 30 January 1904. William McLean died on 25 August 1914 at Nurse Major's Private Hospital in Wellington. He was survived by two sons and three daughters. He is buried at Karori Cemetery, and other family member who share the same plot (38 G) include his wife, his son Sydney, a daughter in law, and grandchildren.

New Zealand Parliament
| Preceded by Kennedy Macdonald | Member of Parliament for Wellington; 1892-1893; Served alongside: John Duthie, George Fisher | Succeeded by Francis Bell, Robert Stout, John Duthie |
