= Charlie Izard =

New Zealand politician

The Honourable Charlie Izard
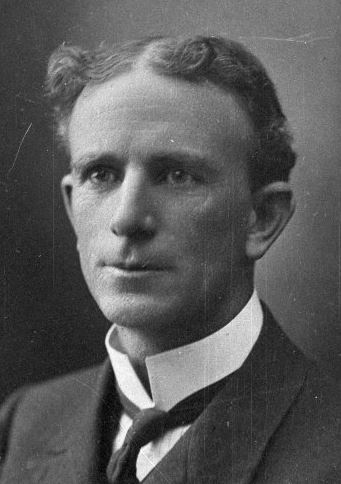

Member of the New Zealand Parliament for Wellington North
- In office 6 December 1905 – 17 November 1908
- Preceded by: seat established
- Succeeded by: Alexander Herdman

Personal details
- Born: 19 January 1862 Wellington, New Zealand
- Died: 18 September 1925 (aged 63) Upper Hutt, New Zealand
- Party: Liberal
- Spouse: Stella Margaret Halsted (m. 1886)
- Relations: Charles Beard Izard (father)
- Profession: Lawyer

Charles Hayward Izard (19 January 1862 – 18 September 1925), known as Charlie, was a Liberal Party Member of Parliament in New Zealand, and a Wellington lawyer.

== Biography ==
=== Early life ===
Izard was born in Wellington on 19 January 1862, the eldest son of Charles Beard Izard, who was a prominent and popular Wellington lawyer and MP for Wellington Suburbs. After having primary education in Wellington, Izard was sent to Harrow, England and read for the bar at Lincoln's Inn where he was admitted as a barrister in 1883. On 12 July 1886, Izard married Stella Margaret Halsted at St Paul's Cathedral in Wellington.

=== Professional career ===
Izard returned to New Zealand and practiced with the firm Bell Gully together with his father. He subsequently practised on his own, and later partners included Thomas S. Weston, J. F. B. Stevenson, and S. J. Castle.

=== Political career ===
New Zealand Parliament
Years	Term	Electorate	Party
1905–1908	16th	Wellington North	Liberal

Izard was for many years a member of Wellington City Council. Izard then stood for City of Wellington in a by-election in 1905, coming second to fellow Liberal Francis Fisher.

He was elected to the Wellington North electorate in the 1905 election, but was defeated in 1908. He was among the more progressive liberals in the caucus of that parliament and an ally, George Laurenson, was disheartened by Izard's defeat in 1908. His younger brother, Dr Arnold Woolford Izard, stood for the Wellington North electorate in the 1911 election on behalf of the Liberal Party.

He was appointed to the Legislative Council by the National wartime coalition government on 7 May 1918, and served there until he died in 1925.

=== Family and death ===
He died at his residence Totara in Maoribank, Upper Hutt on 18 September 1925. His funeral service was held at St Paul's Cathedral in Wellington, and he was buried at Karori Cemetery. He was survived by his wife Stella Izard. They had one son, Keith Halsted Izard, who died in London in 1919 of pneumonia while on war service.

== Legacy ==
Izard left the bulk of his estate for the establishment of an educational and charitable trust, the Charles Hayward Izard Trust, administered by the Wellington City Council. Izard Road in Wellington is named after him. `

== Notes ==
New Zealand Parliament
New constituency	Member of Parliament for Wellington North; 1905–1908	Succeeded by Alexander Herdman
