= William Bowler =

New Zealand businessman and politician

William Bowler (early 1803 – 6 May 1863) was a New Zealand businessman and politician. In 1857 he became a Wellington Provincial Councillor, holding that position until 1861.

== Early life ==
Originally from England, Bowler was involved with the New Zealand Company for a decade before emigrating to New Zealand in 1851. Upon arrival, he partnered with Isaac Cookson in Lyttelton, engaging in merchant and shipping ventures. Later, he established his own firm in Wellington. Bowler represented Wellington in the Provincial Council from 1857 to 1861 and made two bids for parliamentary seats.

== Death ==
Bowler died on 6 May 1863 at his home on Hawkestone Street, Wellington after a long disease. He was 60 years old.
