= Wellington North (New Zealand electorate) =

- Single-member general constituency for the New Zealand House of Representatives
- Interactive map of boundaries from the 2026 election
- Formation: 1905, 2026
- Region: Wellington
- Character: Urban
- Term: 3 years

Member for Wellington North
- Tamatha Paul
- Party: Green

Wellington North is a New Zealand electorate, returning a single member to the New Zealand House of Representatives. A former electorate from 1905 to 1946, it has been recreated with new boundaries for the 2026 general election.

== Population centres ==
The seat covers the central and northern suburbs of Wellington including the CBD, Thorndon, Pipitea, Te Aro, Aro Valley, Oriental Bay, Mount Victoria, Kelburn, Northland, Karori, Wilton, Ngaio, Khandallah, Broadmeadows, Kaiwharawhara, Crofton Downs and Wadestown.

== History ==
=== 1905 to 1946 ===
From 1890 until 1905, the four main centres of New Zealand (Auckland, Wellington, Christchurch and Dunedin) were represented by three-member electorates. The City Single Electorates Act 1903 divided those electorates, effective from the end of the 15th Parliament. The City of Wellington electorate was split into the Wellington East, Wellington Central, and Wellington North electorates.

At its establishment, Wellington North covered areas north of the central city including the modern suburbs of Thorndon, Pipitea, Wadestown, Northland, Kelburn, Te Aro, Wilton and Kaiwharawhara, as well as Somes Island. For the purpose of the country quota, the electorate was always regarded as fully urban. In the boundary review before the 1946 general election, Wellington North was one of 26 electorates to be abolished. Suburbs in Wellington North were redistributed between Wellington Central, Karori and Onslow.

=== From 2026 ===
The 2025 boundary review required a reduction in North Island electorates by one to reflect nationwide population shifts. The three Wellington City electorates (Rongotai, Wellington Central and Ōhāriu) were all underpopulated. All were abolished. The suburbs of Ngaio, Khandallah, Broadmeadows, Kaiwharawhara, Crofton Downs and Wadestown were combined with most of the former Wellington Central electorate (including Thorndon, Wellington CBD, Aro Valley, Kelburn and Mount Victoria) and the new electorate was named Wellington North.

=== Members of Parliament ===
Until its abolition in 1946, the electorate was represented by four members of parliament.

Charlie Izard of the Liberal Party was the electorate's first representative from 1905 to 1908, when he was defeated by Alexander Herdman. Herdman had previously represented the Mount Ida electorate. He joined the Reform Party but resigned from Parliament in February 1918.

Herdman was succeeded by John Luke of the Reform Party in the resulting 1918 by-election. In the 1928 election, Luke was defeated by Charles Chapman of the Labour Party. Chapman represented the electorate from 1928 to 1946, and moved to the Wellington Central electorate when Wellington North was abolished.

Key

Liberal Conservative Reform Labour

Election	Winner
1905 election	Charlie Izard
1908 election	Alexander Herdman
1911 election	Alexander Herdman
1914 election	Alexander Herdman
1918 by-election	John Luke
1919 election	John Luke
1922 election	John Luke
1925 election	John Luke
1928 election	Charles Chapman
1931 election	Charles Chapman
1935 election	Charles Chapman
1938 election	Charles Chapman
1943 election	Charles Chapman
(electorate abolished 1946; see Onslow)
2026 election	Tamatha Paul

== Election results ==
=== 2026 election ===
The next election will be held on 7 November 2026. Candidates for Wellington North are listed at Candidates in the 2026 New Zealand general election by electorate § Wellington North. Official results will be available after 27 November 2026.

=== 1943 election ===
1943 general election: Wellington North
Party	Candidate	Votes	%	±%
Labour	Charles Chapman	7,348	49.80	−10.29
National	Thomas Hislop	5,451	36.94	
Democratic Labour	Horace Herring	1,016	6.89	
People's Movement	Rugby Malcolm	427	2.89	
Independent	Arthur Carman	298	2.02	
Informal votes		215	1.46	+0.77
Majority		1,897	12.86	−7.83
Turnout		14,755		

=== 1938 election ===
1938 general election: Wellington North
Party	Candidate	Votes	%	±%
Labour	Charles Chapman	9,522	60.09	+16.47
Independent Liberal	Elizabeth Gilmer	6,244	39.40	+2.65
Independent	Thomas Folckman Simpson	80	0.50	
Informal votes		110	0.69	−0.22
Majority		3,278	20.69	+13.82
Turnout		15,956	85.29	+1.87
Registered electors		18,709		

=== 1935 election ===
1935 general election: Wellington North
Party	Candidate	Votes	%	±%
Labour	Charles Chapman	5,039	43.62	−0.61
Independent	Elizabeth Gilmer	4,245	36.75	
Reform	Charles Treadwell	2,266	19.61	
Informal votes		106	0.91	+0.25
Majority		794	6.87	−3.49
Turnout		11,550	83.42	+12.09
Registered electors		13,845		

=== 1931 election ===
1931 general election: Wellington North
Party	Candidate	Votes	%	±%
Labour	Charles Chapman	4,531	44.23	−4.84
Reform	George Troup	3,470	33.87	
Independent	John Luke	2,243	21.90	−26.74
Informal votes		68	0.66	−1.63
Majority		1,061	10.36	+9.95
Turnout		10,312	71.33	−10.10
Registered electors		14,457		

=== 1928 election ===
1928 general election: Wellington North
Party	Candidate	Votes	%	±%
Labour	Charles Chapman	5,611	49.07	
Reform	John Luke	5,564	48.64	−2.66
Informal votes		263	2.29	+1.15
Majority		47	0.41	
Turnout		11,438	81.43	−7.22
Registered electors		14,046		

=== 1925 election ===
1925 general election: Wellington North
Party	Candidate	Votes	%	±%
Reform	John Luke	5,712	51.30	+7.40
Labour	Harry Combs	3,766	33.82	−6.52
Liberal	Jack McGrath	1,528	13.72	
Informal votes		127	1.14	+0.02
Majority		1,946	17.47	+13.91
Turnout		11,133	88.65	−0.98
Registered electors		12,558		

=== 1922 election ===
1922 general election: Wellington North
Party	Candidate	Votes	%	±%
Reform	John Luke	4,624	43.90	+1.20
Labour	Harry Combs	4,249	40.34	
Liberal	James Young	1,540	14.62	
Informal votes		118	1.12	+0.21
Majority		375	3.56	−7.81
Turnout		10,531	89.63	+11.30
Registered electors		11,749		

=== 1919 election ===
1919 general election: Wellington North
Party	Candidate	Votes	%	±%
Reform	John Luke	3,999	42.70	+0.81
Liberal	H. Oakley Browne	2,934	31.33	
Labour	John Read	2,345	25.04	
Majority		1,065	11.37	+5.48
Informal votes		86	0.91	+0.35
Turnout		9,364	78.33	
Registered electors		11,954		

=== 1918 by-election ===
1918 Wellington North by-election
Party	Candidate	Votes	%	±%
Reform	John Luke	2,986	41.89	
Labour	Harry Holland	2,566	35.99	+15.50
Liberal	Alfred Brandon	816	11.44	
Independent Liberal	Angus James Neville Polson	720	10.10	
Majority		420	5.89	
Informal votes		40	0.56	−0.70
Turnout		7,128		
Reform hold		Swing		

=== 1914 election ===
1914 general election: Wellington North
Party	Candidate	Votes	%	±%
Reform	Alexander Herdman	4,550	55.23	+2.15
Liberal	William Turnbull	1,895	23.00	
Social Democrat	Harry Holland	1,688	20.49	
Majority		2,655	32.23	+3.61
Informal votes		104	1.26	−0.46
Turnout		8,237	82.90	+8.75
Registered electors		9,936		

=== 1911 election ===
1911 general election: Wellington North
Party	Candidate	Votes	%	±%
Reform	Alexander Herdman	4,193	53.08	−2.93
Liberal	Arnold Woodford Izard	2,386	30.20	
Labour	Elijah Carey	1,185	15.00	
Informal votes		136	1.72	+1.30
Majority		2,261	28.62	+16.17
Turnout		7,900	74.15	+6.91
Registered electors		10,654		

=== 1908 election ===
1908 general election: Wellington North, first ballot
Party	Candidate	Votes	%	±%
Conservative	Alexander Herdman	2,824	41.57	
Independent Liberal	Frederick Bolton	1,858	27.35	
Liberal	Charlie Izard	1,833	26.98	−23.84
Independent	Henry Bodley	131	1.92	
Informal votes		147	2.16	+0.73
Turnout		6,793	68.85	
Second ballot result
Conservative	Alexander Herdman	3,716	56.01	+14.44
Independent Liberal	Frederick Bolton	2,890	43.56	+16.21
Informal votes		28	0.42	−1.74
Majority		826	12.45	
Turnout		6,634	67.24	−1.61

=== 1905 election ===
1905 general election: Wellington North
Party	Candidate	Votes	%	±%
Liberal	Charlie Izard	3,283	50.82	
Conservative	John Duthie	2,794	43.25	
Ind. Labour League	George Macfarlane	290	4.48	
Informal votes		93	1.43	
Majority		489	7.56	
Turnout		6,460		
