= John Aitken (politician) =

New Zealand politician (1849–1921)

The Honourable John Aitken
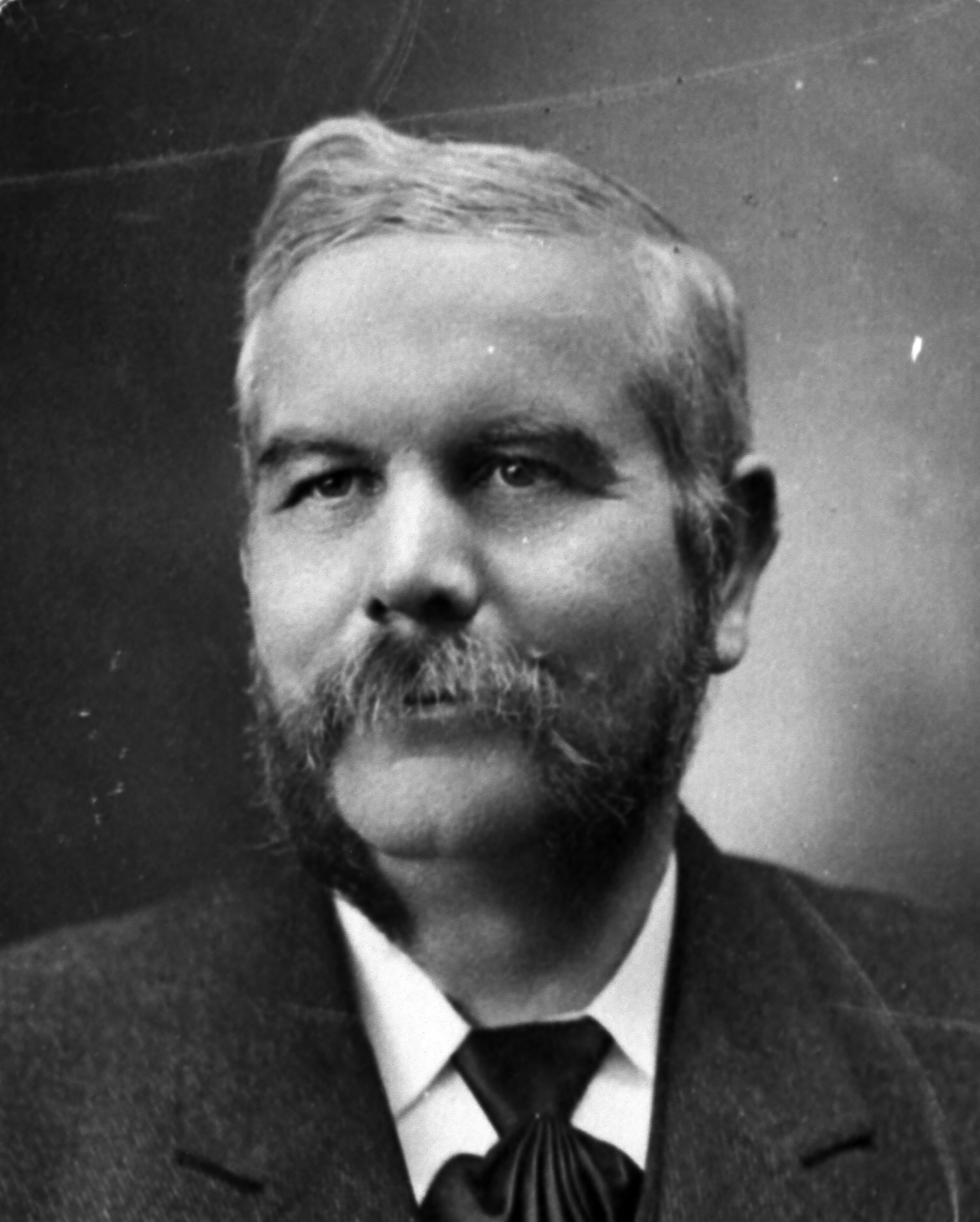
- Aitken in about 1906

Member of the New Zealand Parliament for City of Wellington
- In office 1902–1905

Member of the New Zealand Parliament for Wellington East
- In office 1905–1908
- Preceded by: New electorate
- Succeeded by: David McLaren

15th Mayor of Wellington
- In office 1900–1905
- Preceded by: John Blair
- Succeeded by: Thomas William Hislop

Member of the New Zealand Legislative Council
- In office 1914–1921

Moderator of the General Assembly of the Presbyterian Church of New Zealand
- In office 20 November 1917 – 18 February 1919

Personal details
- Born: John Guthrie Wood Aitken; 6 February 1849 Kintyre, Argyleshire, Scotland
- Died: 17 August 1921 (aged 72) Wellington, New Zealand

John Guthrie Wood Aitken (6 February 1849 – 17 August 1921) was the Mayor of Wellington, New Zealand from 1900 to 1905.

== Biography ==
=== Early life ===
Aitken was born at Low Park Farm, Kilchenzie, Kintyre, Argyleshire, Scotland, on 6 February 1849 and educated at Campbeltown Grammar School.

Aitken was employed by James Templeton and Co, Glasgow. He was apparently a skilled employee, being sent to London to take charge of the Company, a position he held for 12 years. In 1882 he became acquainted with George Wilson and entered into partnership with him as a general merchant in Wellington, New Zealand. Aitken became a Director of Guardian Insurance Company, the Australian Widows' Fund (which amalgamated with the Mutual Life Association of Australasia), Scoullar and Co, Fresh Food and Ice Co, Consolidated Dental Co, as well as some other companies. He was also Chairman of Directors of the New Zealand Board of the New Zealand Loan and Mercantile Agency Company.

=== Political career ===
New Zealand Parliament
Years	Term	Electorate	Party
1902–1905	15th	City of Wellington	Independent
1905–1908	16th	Wellington East	Independent

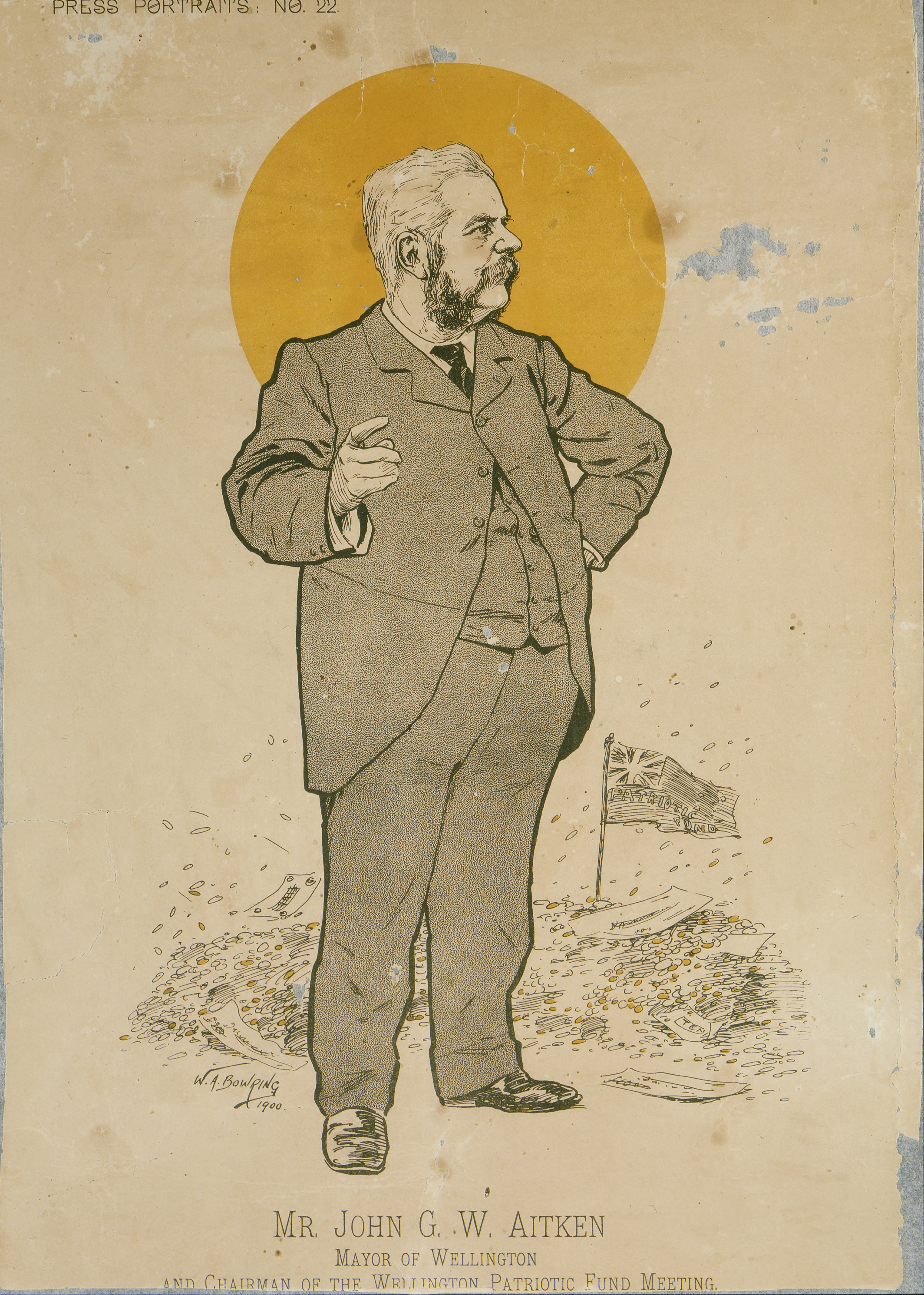
John Guthrie Wood Aitken caricature, 1900

In 1899 Aitken entered politics being elected Mayor of Wellington from 1900 to May 1905 when he retired. He represented the City of Wellington electorate from 1902 (he was successful in his first attempt to enter parliament) to 1905, and then the Wellington East electorate from 1905 to 1908. He did not stand in 1908, thus ending his term. He was a member of the Legislative Council from 1914 to 1921.

He was Chairman of the Wellington Education Board, and in 1917 was the first layman to be Moderator of the General Assembly of the Presbyterian Church of New Zealand. Aitken was one of the founders of the Boys Institute and assisted developing the YMCA in Wellington. Together with the Rev. Dr James Gibb, Aitken was a co-founder of Scots College and Queen Margaret College. He was a supporter of Bible in Schools and the Prohibition movements.

Both Aitken Street and Guthrie Street in Wellington are named after him.

=== Death ===
Aitken died at his home at 2 Levy Street, Wellington on 17 August 1921, and he was buried at Karori Cemetery.

== Notes ==
New Zealand Parliament
Preceded by George Fisher, Arthur Atkinson, John Hutcheson	Member of Parliament for Wellington; 1902–1905; Served alongside: George Fisher, Francis Fisher, John Duthie	Constituency abolished
Vacant Constituency recreated after abolition in 1890 Title last held by George Fisher	Member of Parliament for Wellington East; 1905–1908	Succeeded by David McLaren
Political offices
Preceded by John Rutherfurd Blair	Mayor of Wellington; 1900–1905	Succeeded by Thomas William Hislop
