= David Fisher (trade unionist) =

New Zealand printer, trade unionist and public servant

David Patrick Fisher (c. 1850 – 5 April 1912) was a New Zealand printer, trade unionist and public servant. He was born in Dublin, Ireland 4 April 1850 and died Auckland, April 5 1912. He was the younger brother of four times Wellington Mayor and MHR George Fisher. David Patrick's son, David Percival Fisher - or Percy Fisher (1882–1941) became a notable manufacturing engineer and aviation pioneer.
