= George Fisher (New Zealand politician) =

New Zealand politician and Mayor of Wellington

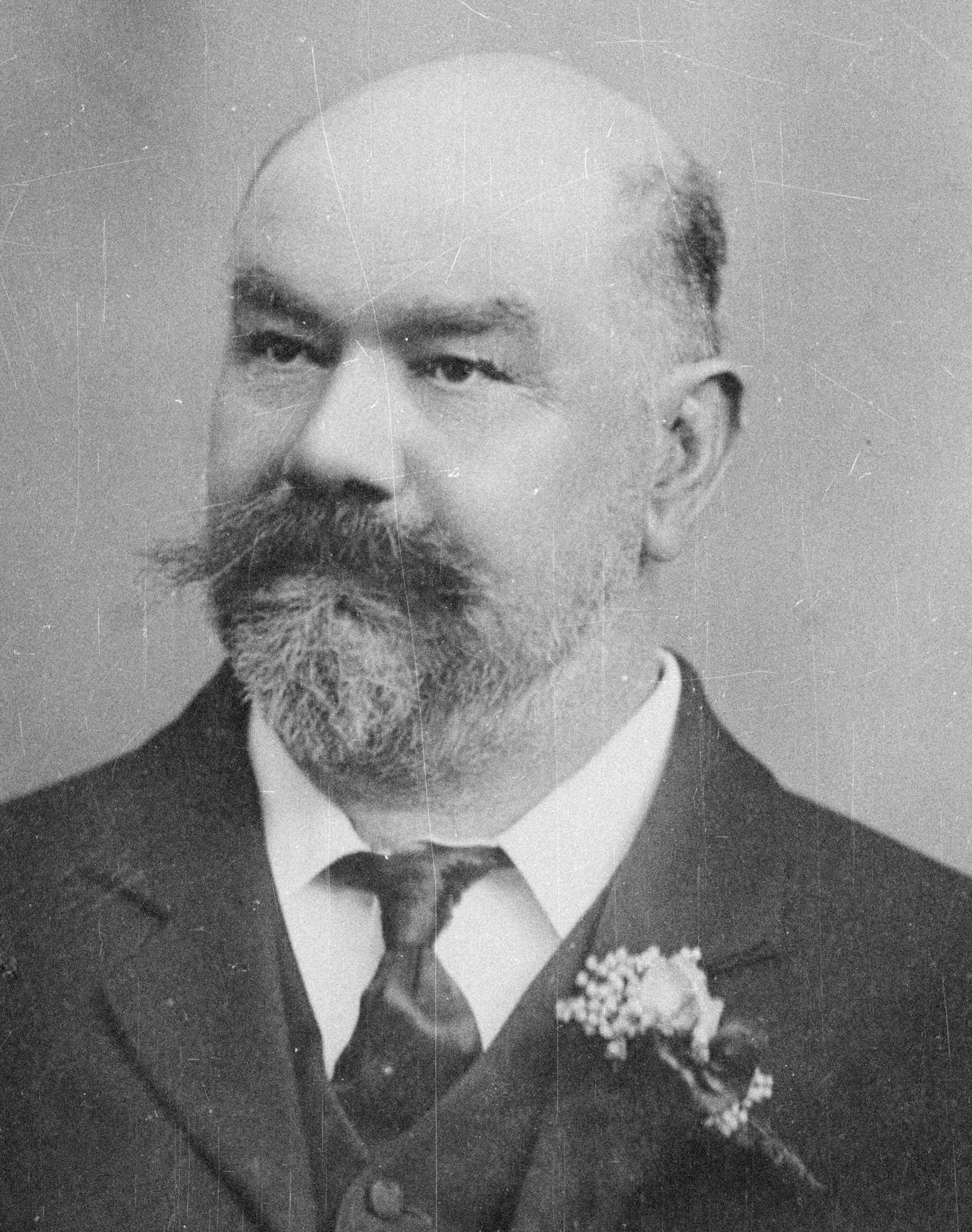
- Fisher, c. 1890s

6th Mayor of Wellington
- In office 19 December 1895 – 16 December 1896
- Preceded by: Charles Luke
- Succeeded by: Francis Bell
- In office 30 November 1881 – 17 December 1885
- Preceded by: William Hutchison
- Succeeded by: Arthur Winton Brown

Personal details
- Born: c. 1843 Dublin, Ireland
- Died: 14 March 1905 Wellington, New Zealand
- Spouse: Laura Emma Tompkins (m. 1866)
- Children: 6

George Fisher (c. 1843 – 14 March 1905) was a New Zealand politician who served as Mayor of Wellington from 1882 to 1885 and 1895 to 1896. He represented various Wellington electorates in Parliament for a total of 18 years. He was nicknamed ‘Tarcoola George’.

== Family ==
Fisher was born in Dublin, Ireland on 25 December 1843, the son of James Fisher, the Government printer in Dublin, and apprenticed as a compositor in London before moving with his family to Melbourne in 1857, where his father became a co-proprietor of The Age newspaper. George arrived in New Zealand in 1863 and worked first as a printer then as a journalist on Hansard (at Parliament). He married Laura Emma Tompkins in Christchurch in 1866 and they had four sons and two daughters.

His son Frank Fisher (1877–1960) was also a Member of Parliament for Wellington between 1905 and 1915, and was Minister of Trade and Customs under Prime Minister William Massey. As a top New Zealand's tennis player, both at home and abroad, FMB Fisher reached the final of the Australian Open in 1906 - one of only four New Zealanders to play in the final of a 'Grand Slam' event. FMB Fisher's eldest daughter, Esther Fisher (1900–1991) became an international pianist.

A brother of George's, David Fisher (1850–1912), also a printer by trade and resident in Wellington 1872–1906, was a leading New Zealand union founder and organiser.

== Political career ==
New Zealand Parliament
Years	Term	Electorate	Party
1884–1887	9th	Wellington South	Independent
1887–1890	10th	Wellington East	Independent
1890–1893	11th	City of Wellington	Liberal
1896–1899	13th	City of Wellington	Liberal
1899–1902	14th	City of Wellington	Liberal
1902–1905	15th	City of Wellington	Liberal

Fisher was a Wellington City Councillor from 1877 to 1881. He was elected Mayor of Wellington four times, from 1882 to 1885, and in 1896.

He represented the Wellington South electorate from the 1884 general election until the end of the parliamentary term in 1887, and then represented the Wellington East electorate from the 1887 general election until the end of the parliamentary term in 1890.

The Wellington East electorate was abolished and replaced with the City of Wellington electorate, and Fisher got elected in this three-member electorate in the 1890 general election. He became a member of the Liberal Party. He was soundly defeated at the 1893 general election coming eight.

He again stood for the City of Wellington in the 1896 general election and was returned. He was also successful in the two subsequent general elections in 1899 and 1902. He died in 1905 while in office, triggering a by-election that was won by his son.

He was Minister of Education and Commissioner of Trade and Customs from October 1887 to April 1889 in Prime Minister Harry Atkinson's Scarecrow Ministry.

Brilliant but alcoholic, he "distinguished himself by being committed to an inebriates' home while still an M.P."

New Zealand Parliament
New constituency	Member of Parliament for Wellington East; 1887–1890	In abeyance Title next held by John Aitken (politician)
In abeyance Title last held by William Hutchison, William Levin	Member of Parliament for Wellington; 1890–1893 served alongside: Kennedy Macdonald, William McLean, John Duthie; 1896–1905 served alongside: Robert Stout, John Duthie, John Hutcheson, Arthur Atkinson, John Aitken	Succeeded by Francis Bell, Robert Stout, John Duthie
Preceded by Francis Bell, Robert Stout, John Duthie	Member of Parliament for Wellington; 1890–1893 served alongside: Kennedy Macdonald, William McLean, John Duthie; 1896–1905 served alongside: Robert Stout, John Duthie, John Hutcheson, Arthur Atkinson, John Aitken	Succeeded by Francis Fisher, John Duthie, John Aitken
Political offices
Preceded by William Hutchison	Mayor of Wellington; 1881–1885 1895–1896	Succeeded by Arthur Winton Brown
Preceded by Charles Luke	Mayor of Wellington; 1881–1885 1895–1896	Succeeded by Francis Bell
Preceded by Robert Stout	Minister of Education; 1887–1889	Succeeded by Harry Atkinson
