= John Hutcheson =

New Zealand politician

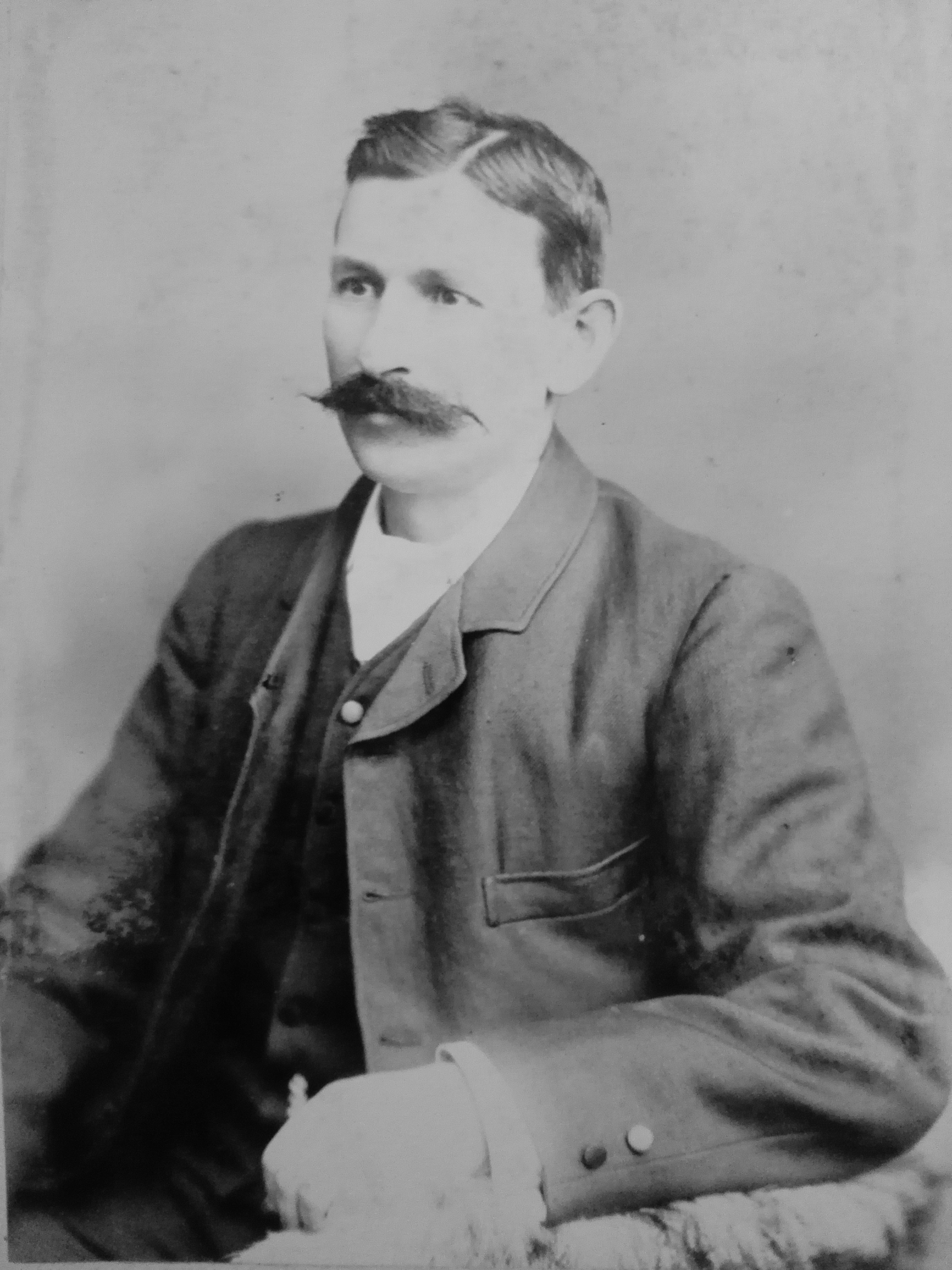

Member of the New Zealand Parliament for City of Wellington
- In office 4 December 1896 – 25 November 1902 alongside George Fisher, Robert Stout, Arthur Atkinson & John Duthie
- Preceded by: John Duthie
- Succeeded by: John Aitken

Personal details
- Born: 1853 Dumbarton, Scotland
- Died: 5 October 1940 (aged 86–87) Wellington, New Zealand
- Party: Liberal–Labour
- Children: 2

John Hutcheson (1853–5 October 1940) was a Member of Parliament in New Zealand, initially supporting the Liberal Party.

== Biography ==
=== Early life ===
A native of Dumbarton, Scotland, where he was born in 1855, he was educated at the Dumbarton Academy, where he gained a South Kensington science and art scholarship, which qualified him for a cadetship in naval architecture at Messrs. Denny Bros.' shipbuilding yards. After about a year, Mr. Hutcheson desired a change, and embarked as an apprentice on one of Messrs. J. and A. Allan's ships. He had the usual experience of "a life on the ocean wave," visiting the East and West Indies and America, remaining a considerable time in the United States. While in Portland, Oregon, he took part in the Presidential Election contests of Hayes and Tilden. Mr. Hutcheson went to Cuba during one of the periodical uprisings, and had to submit to a blockade of some five months at Santiago.

Hutcheson arrived in New Zealand in 1880, as second mate of the barque "Isle of Erin." He subsequently spent four years as first and second mate of several other coastal vessels, including the Government steamers Stella and Hinemoa. Afterwards he was employed for ten years as rigger by Messrs. E. W. Mills and Co., and in 1894 he commenced business on his own account, a company that became HUTCHWILCO.

=== Political career ===
New Zealand Parliament
Years	Term	Electorate	Party
1896–1899	13th	City of Wellington	Liberal–Labour
1899	13th	City of Wellington	Liberal–Labour
1899–1902	14th	City of Wellington	Liberal–Labour

Hutcheson became involved in politics via trade union affairs, and was appointed to the Strike Commission during the maritime strike of 1890 and was a delegate to the conference which unsuccessfully tried to resolve it. He was a member of the Wellington Harbour Board from 1896 to 1900, and was its chairman from 1899 to 1900.

He was returned in the Labour and Liberal interest as senior member for Wellington City at the General Election of 1896. He represented the City of Wellington electorate from 1896 to 3 July 1899, when he resigned.

In what became known as the 'Marine Scandal' Hutcheson and another rebellious Liberal, Frederick Pirani, attacked the Premier Richard Seddon and William Hall-Jones (the Minister of Marine) from the floor of the House of Representatives with allegations of wrongful use of their ministerial powers while issuing master mariners' certificates. Seddon was forced to spend several hours in a courtroom witness box refuting the serious charges laid against him and his minister. The trial played out more like an impeachment of him and his government than a regular court case. A total of 15 days of court proceedings ensued, and at the end of the hearing District Judge Ward and Dr Joseph Giles found the charges made against Seddon and Hall-Jones of wrongful use of their ministerial powers were totally unfounded. Hutcheson then resigned from the house on 6 July 1899 stating that he no longer supported Seddon's Liberal government and would stand apart from it as an independent liberal–labour candidate. He requested voters to endorse his shift of allegiance given it contradicted his pledge to the electorate when he was elected by them in 1896. Days later Hutcheson clarified his allegiance where he would remain a supporter of the Liberal Party, though become an independent supporter of it. Importantly, Hutcheson retained support of the labour movement and the Trades Council placed this on record, voting by a large majority, to show its confidence in him. He won the subsequent by-election on 25 July 1899. He was again elected at the 1899 general election and retired at the end of the term in 1902. He was opposed to the Second Boer War by this time which contrasted to popular opinion on the war at the time, which most people supported.

At the 1915 locale elections he was elected a member of the Wellington City Council. He did not stand for re-election at the 1917 elections but was incorrectly thought to be a candidate at the 1919 elections. A Labour Party candidate named John Hutchison, the secretary of the Tramways Union, stood and is thought to have received many votes from people who thought he was Hutcheson. On the day of the election several of Hutcheson's friends met him to wish him luck and informed him that they had done their best for him by voting for him.

=== Later life and death ===
Hutcheson resumed his business of HUTCHWILCO and was a member of the Wellington City Sinking Fund Commissioners as well as chairman of the Wellington City Renewal Fund Commissioners.

Hutcheson died, at the age of 86, at his home in Kilbirnie on 5 October 1940. He was survived by his wife, son and daughter.

Political offices
Preceded by Francis Fraser	Chair of Wellington Harbour Board; 1899–1900	Succeeded by Harold Beauchamp
New Zealand Parliament
Preceded by John Duthie	Member of Parliament for Wellington; 1896–1902; Served alongside: Robert Stout, George Fisher, John Duthie, Arthur Atkinson	Succeeded by John Aitken
