= Arthur Atkinson (politician, born 1863) =

New Zealand politician (1863–1935)

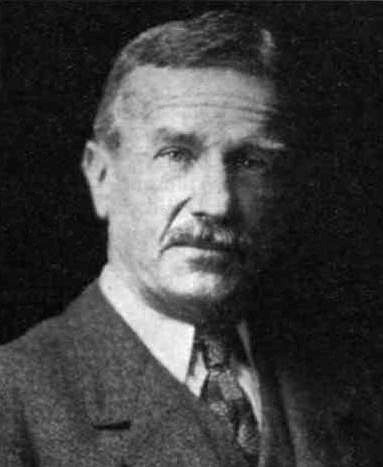

Member of the New Zealand Parliament for City of Wellington
- In office 1899–1902 Serving with George Fisher and John Hutcheson

Personal details
- Born: Arthur Richmond Atkinson; 5 August 1863 New Plymouth, New Zealand
- Died: 26 March 1935 (aged 71) Wadestown, New Zealand
- Resting place: Karori Cemetery
- Spouses: Lily May Kirk (m. 1900; died 1921) Emma Maud Banfield (m. 1923)
- Relations: Charles Fell (brother-in-law); Harry Atkinson (uncle); William Richmond (uncle); James Crowe Richmond (uncle); Henry Richmond (uncle); Mary Richmond (cousin); Dolla Richmond (cousin)
- Parents: Arthur Atkinson (father); Jane Maria Richmond (mother)
- Education: Corpus Christi College, Oxford
- Occupation: Barrister; solicitor

Arthur Alfred Richmond Atkinson (5 August 1863 – 26 March 1935) was a New Zealand barrister and solicitor, Member of Parliament and Wellington City Councillor.

== Early life and education ==
Atkinson was born in New Plymouth, New Zealand, in 1872, the son of Arthur Atkinson and Jane Maria Richmond. On his father's side he was the nephew of Harry Atkinson. On his mother's side he was the nephew of (Christopher) William Richmond, James Crowe Richmond and Henry Richmond. In 1900, he married temperance and women's suffrage campaigner Lily May Kirk in Wellington. After the death of his wife in 1921, Atkinson remarried Emma Maud Banfield, a nursing educator awarded the Royal Red Cross in 1917, in London in 1923.

He was educated at Nelson College in New Zealand and Clifton College in England. After studying at Corpus Christi College, Oxford, Atkinson was called to the Bar by Lincoln's Inn in 1887, before returning to New Zealand the same year.

== Legal career ==
After a period working in law offices in Nelson and Dunedin, Atkinson served as secretary to his uncle, William (Mr Justice) Richmond, between 1889 and 1890. In 1892 he began legal practice in Wellington, joining Charles Morison to form the firm of barristers and solicitors Morison and Atkinson. He later became a partner in Atkinson, Dale and Mather.

== Political career ==
New Zealand Parliament
Years	Term	Electorate	Party
1899–1902	14th	City of Wellington	Independent

Atkinson represented the City of Wellington electorate from 1899 to 1902 when he was defeated; of nine candidates, he came fifth in the three-member electorate. He had become unpopular for speaking out publicly against sending New Zealand troops to support the British in the Boer War of South Africa. He stood unsuccessfully for Wellington East in 1908, being defeated in the second ballot.

He was first elected to the Wellington City Council at the 1909 local-body election. He continued as a city councillor until 1921, when he did not seek re-election.

== Other activities ==
Both Atkinson and his wife Lily were part of the founding of the Forward Movement in Wellington, a non-sectarian Christian movement with origins in London, England which connected adult education through cottage meetings and public lectures with Bible study and charitable work. Led by two Congregational ministers, W.A. Evans (husband of Kate Edger and G.H. Bradbury, the first meeting was held in the Rechabite Hall on Sunday, 27 August 1893, and the Atkinsons were appointed to a committee of management that organised the event venues and community partnerships. Atkinson was active in the prohibition movement, and was president of the New Zealand Alliance from 1920 to 1922. From 1907 to 1911 he was the New Zealand correspondent for The Morning Post newspaper in London, and subsequently held the same role with The Times. He also contributed a biography of William Massey and the article on New Zealand to the 1922 edition of Encyclopædia Britannica.

== Death ==
Atkinson died at his residence in the Wellington suburb of Wadestown on 26 March 1935. He was buried at Karori Cemetery.

New Zealand Parliament
Preceded by John Duthie, George Fisher, John Hutcheson	Member of Parliament for City of Wellington; 1899–1902; Served alongside: George Fisher, John Hutcheson	Succeeded by John Duthie, George Fisher, John Aitken
