= Liberal–Labour (New Zealand) =

Defunct political association in New Zealand

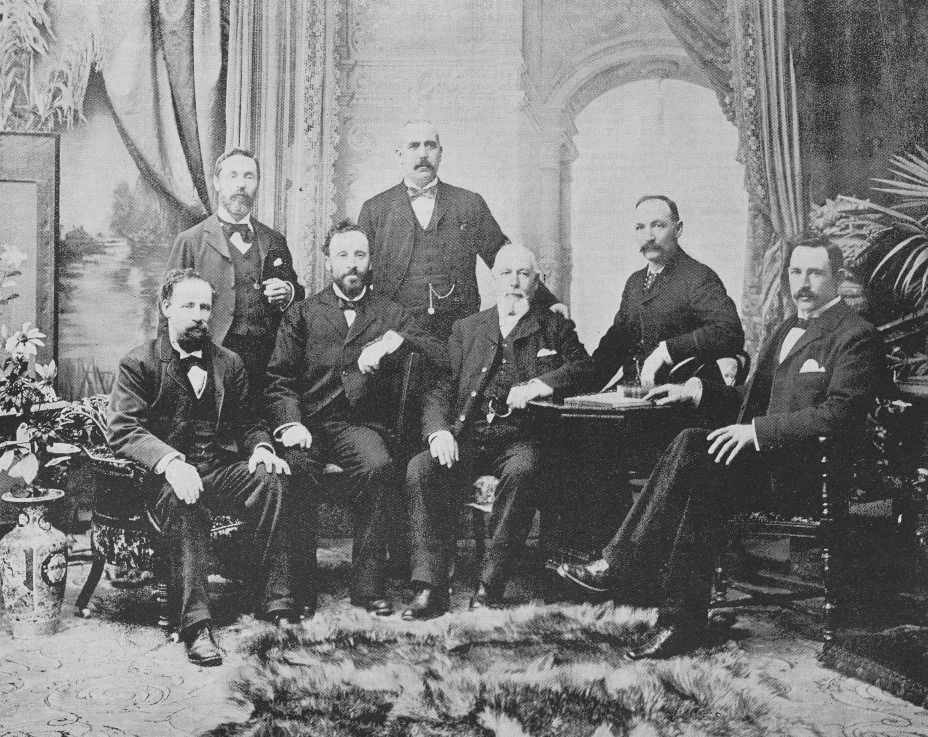
New Zealand Liberal–Labour MPs, 1896. Back; William Tanner, Arthur Morrison, John A. Millar. Front; William Earnshaw, James Kelly, David Pinkerton, Lindsay Buick.

Liberal–Labour (often referred to as "Lib–Lab") was a political association in New Zealand in the last decade of the nineteenth and first half of the twentieth centuries. It represented candidates who stood for the New Zealand Liberal Party while also receiving endorsement and support from the labour (trade union) movement.

== History ==
Initially, Liberal–Labour candidates were usually members of the Liberal Party who received Labour movement endorsement and/or advocated on behalf of labourers and trade unions in parliament. This was mainly a result of the early unionists being mostly anti-political. In 1890, there was a "Lib–Lab" alliance where Liberals and Labour sympathizers co-operated with each other. The two agreed on candidates who ran on combined tickets in several electorates. Equally, in others where only one was running against a government member, supporters of both backed each other's candidates. Most Liberal-Labour support initially came from the South Island; prior to 1905, only one MP considered to be Liberal–Labour (John Hutcheson) came from a North Island seat.

When the Liberal Party won power in 1890, five members of John Ballance's caucus claimed to be "Labour" MPs. They claimed to be from a Labour "party", though it was mostly regarded that they were merely the Labour "faction" of the Liberals. In the 1893 election they were joined by two more Liberals identifying as representing Labour interests. However, in 1896 three of the Labour members were defeated and the remaining Labour aligned Liberals merged more definitely with the other Liberals. The Liberals attempted to strengthen their support base with unionists by creating the Liberal–Labour Federation in 1899 hoping to attract formal trade union support. Many electoral alliances were formed between the Liberals and Labour particularly during second ballots in the 1908 and 1911 elections.

From 1904 to 1913, there was increasing debate by unionists on the issue to separate themselves from the Liberals, which ultimately led to the creation of the present-day Labour Party in 1916.

== Local government ==
At the 1901 Auckland City Council election the Liberal and Labour Federation ran nine candidates and endorsed John Logan Campbell for Mayor of Auckland City. All nine Liberal–Labour candidates and Campbell were elected. The Workers' Municipal Reform League endorsed Arthur Rosser, a Liberal–Labour candidate, in the South ward.

== Notable Liberal–Labour MPs ==
Name	Electorate	From	To	Notes
William Tanner	Heathcote; Avon	1890; 1893	1893; 1908	Considered to be "the first Labour candidate" elected to Parliament.
David Pinkerton	City of Dunedin	1890	1896	
William Earnshaw	Peninsula; City of Dunedin	1890; 1893	1893; 1896	
Lindsay Buick	Wairau	1890	1896	
James Whyte Kelly	Invercargill	1890	1899	
Ebenezer Sandford	City of Christchurch	1891	1893	First elected in by-election
Arthur Morrison	Caversham	1893	1901	Died in office
John A. Millar	Chalmers; City of Dunedin; Dunedin Central; Dunedin West	1893; 1896; 1905; 1911	1896; 1905; 1911; 1914	Liberal only from 1905 onwards
John Hutcheson	City of Wellington	1896	1902	
James Arnold	City of Dunedin; Dunedin South; Dunedin Central	1899; 1905; 1908	1905; 1908; 1911	
Alfred Barclay	City of Dunedin; Dunedin North	1899; 1905	1902; 1908	
James Thomas Hogan	Wanganui	1905	1911	Independent MP for Rangitikei, 1928–31
Bob Ross	Pahiatua	1905	1911	
Tommy Taylor	Christchurch North	1908	1911	New Liberal MP 1905, died in office
Sydney George Smith	Taranaki	1919	1922	Joined the Liberal Party in 1922
