= 15th New Zealand Parliament =

Term of the Parliament of New Zealand

15th Parliament of New Zealand
←	14th Parliament	16th Parliament	→
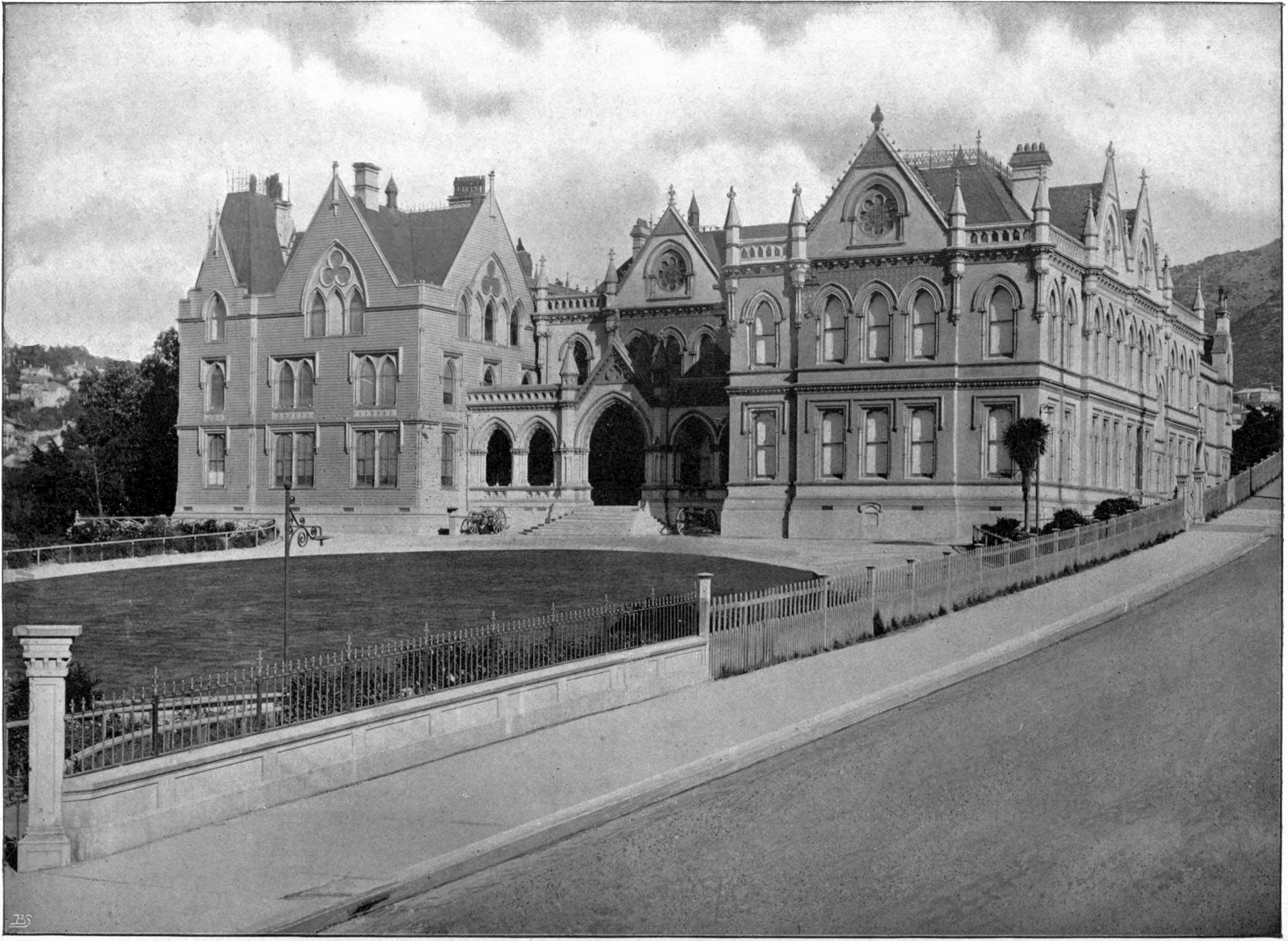

Overview
- Legislative body: New Zealand Parliament
- Term: 29 June 1903 – 30 October 1905
- Election: 1902 New Zealand general election
- Government: Liberal Government

House of Representatives
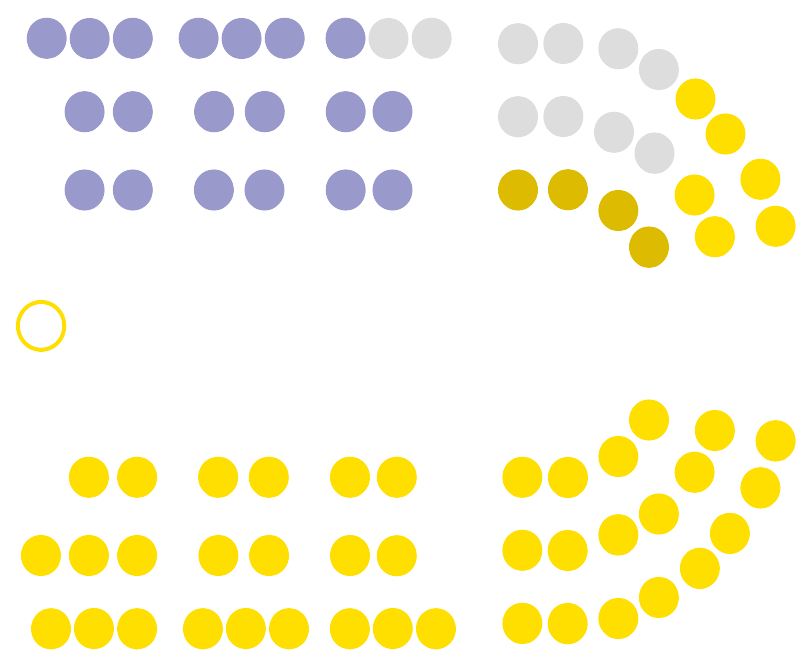
- Members: 80
- Speaker of the House: Arthur Guinness
- Premier: Richard Seddon
- Leader of the Opposition: William Massey

Legislative Council
- Members: 46 (at start); 41 (at end)
- Speaker of the Council: Charles Bowen — Richard Reeves acting 23 March - 30 June 1905 — Alfred Cadman until 23 March 1905 † — John Rigg acting 5 January - 7 July 1904 — William Walker until 5 January 1904† — Henry Miller until 9 July 1903

Sovereign
- Monarch: HM Edward VII
- Governor: HE Rt. Hon. THe Lord Plunket — HE Rt. Hon. The Earl of Ranfurly until 20 June 1904

The 15th New Zealand Parliament was a term of the New Zealand Parliament. It was elected at the 1902 general election in November and December of that year.

== 1902 electoral redistribution ==
The Representation Act 1900 had increased the membership of the House of Representatives from general electorates 70 to 76, and this was implemented through the 1902 electoral redistribution. In 1902, changes to the country quota affected the three-member electorates in the four main centres. The tolerance between electorates was increased to ±1,250 so that the Representation Commissions (since 1896, there had been separate commissions for the North and South Islands) could take greater account of communities of interest. These changes proved very disruptive to existing boundaries. Six electorates were established for the first time: Courtenay, Newtown, Grey Lynn , Hurunui, Oroua, and Kaipara. Two electorates that previously existed were re-established: Mount Ida and Hutt.

This boundary redistribution resulted in the abolition of three electorates:

- Ashley, held by Richard Meredith
- Suburbs of Wellington, held by Thomas Wilford
- Waihemo, held by Thomas Mackenzie

== 1902 general election ==
The 1902 general election was held on Tuesday, 25 November in the general electorates and on Monday, 22 December in the Māori electorates, respectively. A total of 80 MPs were elected; 38 represented North Island electorates, 38 represented South Island electorates, and the remaining four represented Māori electorates. 415,789 voters were enrolled and the official turnout at the election was 76.7%.

== Sessions ==
The 15th Parliament sat for three sessions, and was prorogued on 15 November 1905.

Session	Opened	Adjourned
first	29 June 1903	24 November 1903
second	28 June 1904	8 November 1904
third	27 June 1905	31 October 1905

== Ministries ==
The Liberal Government of New Zealand had taken office on 24 January 1891. The Seddon Ministry under Richard Seddon had taken office in 1893 during the term of the 11th Parliament. The Seddon Ministry remained in power for the whole term of this Parliament and held power until Seddon's death on 10 June 1906.

== Party composition ==
=== Start of term ===
Party	Seats
Liberal	47
Conservative	19
Independent	10
Other	4

== Initial composition of the 15th Parliament ==
The following are the results of the 1902 general election:

Key

Liberal Conservative Independent Liberal Liberal–Labour Independent

Electorate results for the 1902 New Zealand general election
Electorate	Incumbent	Winner	Majority	Runner up
General electorates
Ashburton	John McLachlan		439	John Studholme
Auckland, City of	William Joseph Napier	Alfred Kidd	934	William Richardson
Auckland, City of	Joseph Witheford		1,515	William Joseph Napier
Auckland, City of	George Fowlds	Frederick Baume	2,282	Arthur Rosser
Avon	William Tanner		58	John Russell Brunt
Awarua	Joseph Ward		1,882	David Whyte
Bay of Islands	Robert Houston		410	A G C Glass
Bay of Plenty	William Herries		626	D Lundon
Bruce	James Allen		1,113	J A Scott
Buller	James Colvin		2,601	Frank Isitt
Caversham	Thomas Sidey		444	William Earnshaw
Chalmers	New electorate	Edmund Allen	612	John White
Christchurch, City of	George John Smith	Tommy Taylor	899	William Whitehouse Collins
Christchurch, City of	Harry Ell		901	George John Smith
Christchurch, City of	William Whitehouse Collins	Thomas Davey	2,233	Arthur Hughes Turnbull
Clutha	James William Thomson		640	Daniel Stewart
Courtenay	New electorate	Charles Lewis	350	John Rennie
Dunedin, City of	Alfred Richard Barclay	Harry Bedford	1,321	Alfred Richard Barclay
Dunedin, City of	John A. Millar		1,321	Alfred Richard Barclay
Dunedin, City of	John A. Millar		3,775	R Chisholm
Dunedin, City of	James Arnold		3,775	R Chisholm
Eden	John Bollard		1,628	P E Cheal
Egmont	Walter Symes	William Thomas Jennings	15	Charles Leech
Ellesmere	Heaton Rhodes		501	C R Thornton
Franklin	William Massey		1,176	Alfred Richard Harris
Geraldine	Frederick Flatman		972	William Maslin
Grey	Arthur Guinness		2,145	Frank Isitt
Grey Lynn	New electorate	George Fowlds	118	T T Masefield
Hawera	Felix McGuire	Charles E. Major	21	Felix McGuire
Hawke's Bay	William Russell		1,443	Frank Isitt
Hurunui	New electorate	Andrew Rutherford	697	Henry Fear Reece
Hutt	New electorate	Thomas Wilford	441	Frederick Pirani
Invercargill	Josiah Hanan		1,508	David Whyte
Kaiapoi	David Buddo		1,256	Alfred Daniel Hassall
Kaipara	New electorate	Alfred Harding	359	John Stallworthy
Lyttelton	George Laurenson		2,172	William Rollitt
Manawatu	John Stevens	Job Vile	176	John Stevens
Manukau	Sir Maurice O'Rorke	Matthew Kirkbride	227	Sir Maurice O'Rorke
Marsden	Robert Thompson	Francis Mander	58	Robert Thompson
Masterton	Alexander Hogg		948	J C Cooper
Mataura	Robert McNab		438	J W Raymond
Motueka	Roderick McKenzie		1,838	Frank Isitt
Mount Ida	New electorate	Alexander Herdman	131	John Ewing
Napier	Alfred Fraser		1,490	Richard Joseph Eames
Nelson	John Graham		14	Harry Atmore
Newtown	New electorate	William Barber	28	Thomas Hislop
Oamaru	Thomas Young Duncan		880	John Marshall Brown
Ohinemuri	Jackson Palmer	Edward Moss	186	Jackson Palmer
Oroua	New electorate	Frank Lethbridge	613	Arthur Henry Tompkins
Otaki	William Hughes Field		1,510	Frank Isitt
Pahiatua	John O'Meara		337	Samuel Bolton
Palmerston	Frederick Pirani	William Thomas Wood	384	T R Hodder
Parnell	Frank Lawry		124	John Shera
Patea	Frederick Haselden	Walter Symes	451	Frederick Haselden
Rangitikei	Frank Lethbridge	Arthur Remington	247	W J Birch
Riccarton	George Russell	George Witty	285	George Russell
Selwyn	Charles Hardy		543	Joseph Ivess
Taieri	Walter Carncross	Donald Reid	354	J J Ramsay
Taranaki	Edward Smith		314	Henry Okey
Thames	James McGowan		885	William Henry Lucas
Timaru	William Hall-Jones		1,651	Frank Smith
Tuapeka	James Bennet		66	Robert Gilkison
Waipawa	Charles Hall		1,568	James Taylor
Waikato	Frederic Lang		225	Henry Greenslade
Waikouaiti	Edmund Allen	Thomas Mackenzie	1,846	Frank Isitt
Wairarapa	J. T. Marryat Hornsby	Walter Clarke Buchanan	66	J. T. Marryat Hornsby
Wairau	Charles H. Mills		411	John Duncan
Waitaki	William Steward		592	John Campbell
Waitemata	Richard Monk	Ewen Alison	714	Alexander John Hatfield
Waiapu	James Carroll		1,670	Frank Isitt
Wakatipu	William Fraser		449	Robert Beatson Ross
Wallace	Michael Gilfedder	John Thomson	793	Michael Gilfedder
Wanganui	Archibald Willis		1,438	J W Baker
Wellington, City of	John Hutcheson	John Aitken	380	Patrick O'Regan
Wellington, City of	Arthur Atkinson	John Duthie	591	Arthur Atkinson
Wellington, City of	George Fisher		1,921	John Findlay
Westland	Richard Seddon		2,696	Frank Isitt
Māori electorates
Eastern Maori	Wi Pere		614	Pirimi Mataiawhea
Northern Maori	Hone Heke		1,546	Hāmiora Mangakāhia
Southern Maori	Tame Parata		80	Hone Taare Tikao
Western Maori	Henare Kaihau		2,370	Ngarangi Katitia

== Changes during 15th Parliament ==
There were a number of changes during the term of the 15th Parliament.

=== By-elections ===
Electorate and by-election		Date	Incumbent	Cause	Winner
Pahiatua	1904	28 July	John O'Meara	Death	Bill Hawkins
City of Wellington	1905	6 April	George Fisher	Death	Frank Fisher

=== Defections ===
Name	Year	Seat	From	To
Alfred Harding	1905	Kaipara	Conservative	New Liberal
Francis Fisher	1905	City of Wellington	Independent Liberal	New Liberal
George Laurenson	1905	Lyttelton	Liberal	New Liberal
Harry Bedford	1905	City of Dunedin	Independent Liberal	New Liberal
Tommy Taylor	1905	City of Christchurch	Independent Liberal	New Liberal
