= 12th New Zealand Parliament =

Term of the Parliament of New Zealand

12th Parliament of New Zealand
←	11th Parliament	13th Parliament	→

Overview
- Legislative body: New Zealand Parliament
- Term: 21 June 1894 – 17 October 1896
- Election: 1893 New Zealand general election
- Government: Liberal Government

House of Representatives
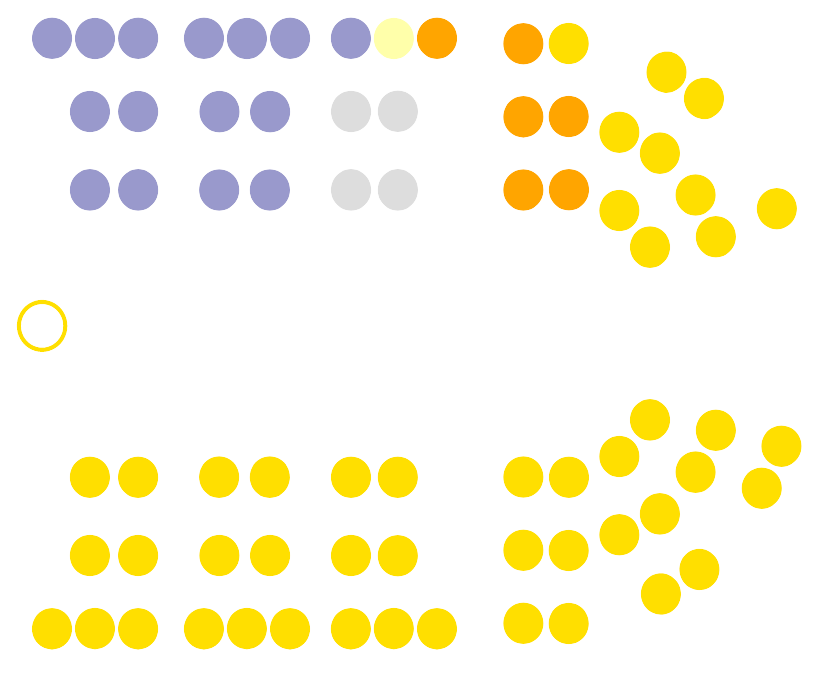
- Members: 74
- Speaker of the House: Maurice O'Rorke
- Premier: Richard Seddon
- Leader of the Opposition: William Russell

Legislative Council
- Members: 46 (at start); 45 (at end)
- Speaker of the Council: Henry Miller

Sovereign
- Monarch: HM Victoria
- Governor: HE Rt. Hon. The Earl of Glasgow

The 12th New Zealand Parliament was a term of the New Zealand Parliament. It was elected at the 1893 general election in November and December of that year.

== 1893 general election ==
In the 1892 electoral redistribution, population shift to the North Island required the transfer of one seat from the South Island to the north. The resulting ripple effect saw every electorate established in 1890 have its boundaries altered, and 14 new electorates were established. Of those, eight electorates were established for the first time: Bay of Plenty, Otaki, Pareora, Patea, Riccarton, Waiapu, Waimea-Sounds, and Wellington Suburbs. The remaining six electorates had existed before, and they were re-established for the 12th Parliament: Caversham, Chalmers, Lyttelton, Rangitata, Waihemo, and Waipa.

The 1893 general election was held on Tuesday, 28 November in the general electorates and on Wednesday, 20 December in the Māori electorates, respectively. A total of 74 MPs were elected; 30 represented North Island electorates, 40 represented South Island electorates, and the remaining four represented Māori electorates. 302,997 voters were enrolled and the official turnout at the election was 75.3%.

== Sessions ==
The 12th Parliament sat for three sessions, and was prorogued on 14 November 1896.

Session	Opened	Adjourned
first	21 June 1894	24 October 1894
second	20 June 1895	1 November 1895
third	11 June 1896	17 October 1896

== Overview of seats ==
Affiliation	Members	
Affiliation	At 1893 election	At dissolution
Liberal	48	48
Liberal–Labour	6	6
Government total	54	54
Conservative	14	15
Independent	5	4
Independent Liberal	1	1
Opposition total	20	20
Total	74	74
Working government majority	34	34

== Ministries ==
The Liberal Government of New Zealand had taken office on 24 January 1891. John Ballance, who had been leading the Ballance Ministry, had died on 27 April 1893 and had been succeeded by the Seddon Ministry under Richard Seddon. The Seddon Ministry remained in power for the whole term of this Parliament and held power until Seddon's death on 10 June 1906.

== Initial composition of the 12th Parliament ==
74 seats were created across 66 electorates. 62 electorates returned a single member and four electoral districts had three representatives each. The Liberal party was the only established party structure at the time, many independent conservative MPs coalesced as a semi-formal Opposition under the leadership of William Russell. Key

Liberal Conservative Liberal–Labour Independent Liberal Independent

Electorate results for the 1893 New Zealand general election
Electorate	Incumbent	Winner	Majority	Runner up
General electorates
Ashburton	Edward George Wright	John McLachlan	26	Cathcart Wason
Ashley	Richard Meredith		590	David Duncan Macfarlane
Auckland, City of	John Shera	George Grey	2,233	Thomas Tudehope (Note: Majority is difference in votes to fourth candidate)
Auckland, City of	Thomas Thompson	William Crowther	438	Thomas Tudehope
Auckland, City of	Alfred Cadman	Charles Button	68	Thomas Tudehope
Avon	Edwin Blake	William Tanner	653	George McIntyre
Awarua	Joseph Ward		Uncontested	
Bay of Islands	Robert Houston		231	James Trounsen
Bay of Plenty	New electorate	William Kelly	209	Henry Burton
Bruce	James Allen		Uncontested	
Buller	Eugene O'Conor	Roderick McKenzie	213	Eugene O'Conor
Caversham	New electorate	Arthur Morrison	136	William Barron
Chalmers	New electorate	John A. Millar	119	Edmund Allen
Christchurch, City of	William Pember Reeves		1,848	Ebenezer Sandford (Note: Majority is difference in votes to fourth candidate)
Christchurch, City of	Ebenezer Sandford	George Smith	916	Ebenezer Sandford
Christchurch, City of	Richard Molesworth Taylor	William Whitehouse Collins	281	Ebenezer Sandford
Clutha	Thomas Mackenzie		832	James Burgh
Dunedin, City of	David Pinkerton		1,294	Henry Fish (Note: Majority is difference in votes to fourth candidate)
Dunedin, City of	Henry Fish	William Earnshaw	589	Henry Fish
Dunedin, City of	William Hutchison		294	Henry Fish
Eden	Edwin Mitchelson		1,161	Malcolm Niccol
Egmont	Felix McGuire		135	Benjamin Robbins
Ellesmere	John Hall	William Montgomery	293	William Rolleston
Franklin	Ebenezer Hamlin	Benjamin Harris	89	William Massey
Grey	Arthur Guinness		1,723	Richard Nancarrow
Hawke's Bay	William Russell		70	Charles William Reardon
Inangahua	Robert Stout	Patrick O'Regan	204	William Goodwin Collings
Invercargill	James Whyte Kelly		1,242	Joseph Hatch
Kaiapoi	Richard Moore	David Buddo	87	Richard Moore
Lyttelton	New electorate	John Joyce	1,041	Edwin Blake
Manukau	Frank Buckland	Maurice O'Rorke	252	Frank Buckland
Marsden	Robert Thompson (Note: Robert Thompson was an Independent in the previous Parliament)		1,010	James Harrison
Masterton	Alexander Hogg		1,228	Joseph Harkness
Mataura	George Richardson	Robert McNab	119	George Richardson
Napier	George Swan	Samuel Carnell	520	George Swan
Nelson	Joseph Harkness	John Graham	279	Richmond Hursthouse
New Plymouth	Edward Smith		491	Robert Trimble
Oamaru	Thomas Duncan		416	PB Fraser
Otaki	New electorate	James Wilson	195	Donald Fraser
Palmerston	James Wilson	Frederick Pirani	203	George Matthew Snelson
Pareora	New electorate	Frederick Flatman	217	Arthur Rhodes
Parnell	Frank Lawry		334	William Shepherd Allen
Patea	New electorate	George Hutchison	673	William Cowern
Rangitata	New electorate	William Maslin	67	Edward George Wright
Rangitikei	Robert Bruce	John Stevens	176	Frank Lethbridge
Riccarton	New electorate	George Russell	106	William Boag
Selwyn	Alfred Saunders		232	Thomas Hamilton Anson
Taieri	Walter Carncross		76	John Buckland
Thames	James McGowan		311	Edmund Taylor
Timaru	William Hall-Jones		407	Edward George Kerr
Tuapeka	Hugh Valentine	Vincent Pyke	340	Charles Rawlins
Waihemo	New electorate	John McKenzie	324	Scobie Mackenzie
Waiapu	New electorate	James Carroll	497	Cecil de Lautour
Waikato	Edward Lake	Alfred Cadman	75	Isaac Coates
Waikouaiti	James Green		510	George J. Bruce
Waimea-Sounds	New electorate	Charles H. Mills	333	H Everett
Waipa	New electorate	Frederic Lang	989	Gerald Peacock
Waipawa	William Smith	Charles Hall	378	George Hunter
Wairarapa	Walter Clarke Buchanan		690	George Augustus Fairbrother
Wairau	Lindsay Buick		322	William Sinclair
Waitaki	John McKenzie	William Steward	1,062	Thomas Paterson
Waitemata	Jackson Palmer	Richard Monk	239	Jackson Palmer
Wakatipu	Thomas Fergus	William Fraser	326	John O'Meara
Wallace	James Mackintosh		433	Henry Hirst
Wanganui	Archibald Willis		197	Gilbert Carson
Wellington, City of	John Duthie			Kennedy Macdonald
Wellington, City of	George Fisher	Francis Bell		Kennedy Macdonald
Wellington, City of	William McLean	Sir Robert Stout		Kennedy Macdonald
Wellington Suburbs	New electorate	Alfred Newman	124	Thomas Wilford
Westland	Richard Seddon		Uncontested	
Māori electorates (Note: The affiliation of many of the Māori candidates is unknown or uncertain)
Eastern Maori	James Carroll	Wi Pere	1,399	Hoani Paraone Tunuiarangi
Northern Maori	Eparaima Te Mutu Kapa	Hone Heke Ngapua	507	Eparaima Te Mutu Kapa
Southern Maori	Tame Parata		185	Teoti Pita Mutu
Western Maori	Hoani Taipua	Ropata Te Ao	90	Pepene Eketone

Table footnotes:

== By-elections during 12th Parliament ==
There were a number of changes during the term of the 12th Parliament.

Electorate and by-election		Date	Incumbent	Cause	Winner
Waitemata	1894	9 April	Richard Monk	Election declared invalid	William Massey
Tuapeka	1894	9 July	Vincent Pyke	Death	William Larnach
City of Auckland	1895	24 July	Sir George Grey	Resignation	Thomas Thompson
City of Christchurch	1896	13 February	William Pember Reeves	Appointed Agent-General	Charles Lewis
