= Christchurch by-election =

Christchurch by-election may refer to

== New Zealand ==
- 1856 Town of Christchurch by-election
- 1860 Town of Christchurch by-election
- 1860 Christchurch Country by-elections
- 1867 City of Christchurch by-election
- 1870 City of Christchurch by-election
- 1889 Christchurch North by-election
- 1891 City of Christchurch by-election
- 1896 City of Christchurch by-election
- 1901 City of Christchurch by-election
- 1911 Christchurch North by-election
- 1936 Christchurch mayoral by-election
- 1939 Christchurch South by-election
- 1943 Christchurch East by-election
- 1958 Christchurch mayoral by-election
- 1979 Christchurch Central by-election
- 2013 Christchurch East by-election

== United Kingdom ==
- 1844 Christchurch by-election
- 1932 New Forest and Christchurch by-election
- 1952 Bournemouth East and Christchurch by-election
- 1993 Christchurch by-election
