= William Barber (New Zealand politician) =

New Zealand politician (1857–1943)

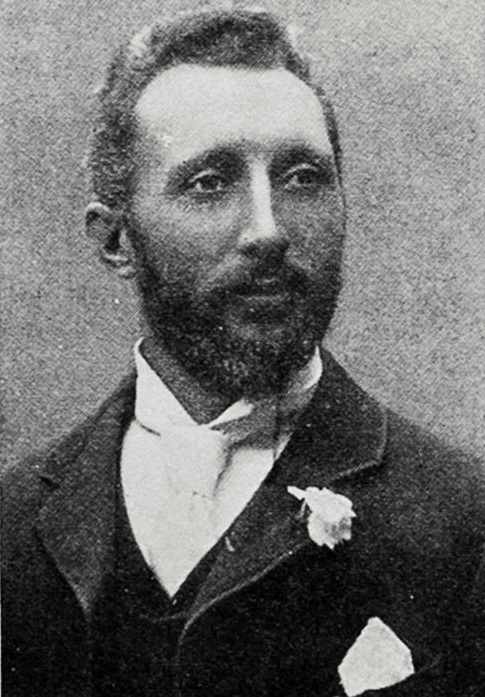

Member of the New Zealand Parliament for Newtown
- In office 25 November 1902 – 17 November 1908
- Preceded by: new electorate
- Succeeded by: electorate abolished

Member of the Wellington City Council
- In office 25 November 1891 – 26 April 1905
- In office 9 September 1910 – 30 April 1919

Personal details
- Born: 10 September 1857 Wellington, New Zealand
- Died: 15 January 1943 (aged 85) Wellington, New Zealand
- Party: Liberal
- Other political affiliations: New Liberal Party
- Spouse: Emily Clarke
- Children: 5

William Henry Peter Barber (10 September 1857 – 15 January 1943) was a New Zealand Member of Parliament for Newtown in Wellington.

== Early life and family ==
Born in Wellington in 1857, Barber was educated at St Peter's School. He began work in his father's dyeing firm of Barber and Company, and eventually became its head. He married Emily Clarke, of Somerset, England, in 1879, and had three sons and two daughters.

== Member of Parliament ==
New Zealand Parliament
Years	Term	Electorate	Party
1902–1905	15th	Newtown	Liberal
1905	Changed allegiance to:		New Liberal
1905–1908	16th	Newtown	Liberal

William Barber represented the Wellington electorate of Newtown for the whole of its existence, from 1902 to 1908. In 1908 he was defeated for the reconstituted electorate of Wellington South.

=== New Liberal Party ===
Barber was associated with the New Liberal Party. His favourite idea was one shared by the other New Liberals-that the institutions of local government should be strengthened and given more scope and power. He heartily supported Harry Ell's 1904 Municipal Corporations Bill, which provided for borough councils to hold referendums. He supported the 1905 Workers' Dwellings Bill, seeing it as a way to expand inner-city areas such as those in his electorate of Newtown.

Barber also advocated state fire insurance, state coal mines, and the old radical favourite, reduction of taxes on the necessities of life. However, he did not favour the elective executive.

He was part of the New Liberal caucus in 1905 that was critical of Prime Minister Richard Seddon. However by the time of the 1905 election he had reconciled with Seddon after being threatened with an official Liberal Party candidate being run against him in Newtown. He rejoined the Liberal caucus and even moved a motion of confidence in Seddon.

== Local-body politics ==
He was elected to the Wellington City Council and served as a councilor for a total of 26 years. First elected in 1891 he remained a councillor until he contested the 1905 mayoral election where he came second, beaten by Thomas William Hislop. He rejoined the council in a 1910 by-election and was a councillor until the 1919 mayoral election when he stood only for mayor against the incumbent, John Luke, but he placed third.

== Other activities ==
He served as a director of the Wellington Woollen Company (chairman at the time of his death), and chairman of directors of the Wellington Opera House Company. He was a member of the Hutt Valley Electric Power Board (retired 1933); director of Wellington Deposit and Mortgage Company; chairman of the Wellington College Board of Governors (1924–31) and a member of the Kauri Timber Royal Commission.

In 1935, he was awarded the King George V Silver Jubilee Medal.

== Death ==
Barber died in Wellington on 15 January 1943, and was buried at Karori Cemetery.

== Citations ==
New Zealand Parliament
New constituency	Member of Parliament for Newtown; 1902–1908	Constituency abolished
