= 1901 City of Christchurch by-election =

New Zealand by-election

The City of Christchurch by-election of 1901 was a by-election held on 18 July 1901 during the 14th New Zealand Parliament in the urban seat of the City of Christchurch. The by-election was triggered by the resignation of conservative politician Charles Lewis and won by George John Smith.

== Background ==
Lewis was first elected in the 1896 City of Christchurch by-election. As a conservative, he won despite the electorate being mostly liberal supporters due to vote splitting by two candidates with liberal leanings. Lewis was confirmed by the voters in the 1896 and 1899 general elections, but he found the parliamentary work demanding to his health. At the time, sessions regularly extended into the evening or the early morning, sometimes even all night. He missed the last week of the session in 1900 due to exhaustion. When he called a meeting in Christchurch in June 1901 that was poorly attended, he felt unsupported by the constituency and resigned later that week. Christchurch's main newspaper, The Press, argued that people were focussed on the upcoming royal visit instead. His resignation was announced in the newspapers on 12 June 1901.

The by-election was the first election held under the provisions of the Electoral Act Amendment Act, 1900. The parliamentary session of 1901 opened on 1 July. The prime minister, Richard Seddon, moved in the House of Representatives on 3 July that the speaker issue writs for the Christchurch and Patea by-elections. The Christchurch registrar of elections received the writ on 4 July, and that closed the electoral roll.

== Candidates ==
=== Arthur Hughes Turnbull ===
The first person to confirm his candidacy was Arthur Hughes Turnbull. His father, Richard Turnbull, had represented the Timaru electorate from 1868 to 1890. Turnbull stood as an independent Liberal. One of the people who nominated Turnbull was Thomas Gapes.

=== Charles Taylor ===
Charles Taylor had stood in the 1899 general election as a Liberal–Labour candidate and came sixth of the eight candidates; prior to that election campaign, he had been virtually unknown. In June 1901, the Trades and Labour Council decided to ask its 5,000 members in Christchurch to choose between Charles Taylor, W. Newton, and G. Fisher by ballot. It was reported on 21 June that Taylor had "decidedly" won the selection.

=== George John Smith ===
Tommy Taylor was regarded as almost certain to stand as a prohibitionist; he had previously represented the City of Christchurch electorate and was very popular. If Taylor decided not to stand, George John Smith would stand instead. A large meeting was held on 18 June where Smith announced that he would not stand, and Taylor was asked by unanimous resolution to become a candidate. Two days later, Taylor announced that he could not stand because of business commitments. Smith accepted to become a candidate at a meeting held on 27 June in the hall of the Trinity Church, with James Arthur Flesher as the chairman of his election committee. Smith stood as an independent Liberal.

=== William Hoban ===
William Hoban announced his candidacy on 22 June by newspaper advertisement. He had previously run for election, and represented the interests of licensed victuallers. He withdrew again to avoid "vote splitting" on 9 July.

== Campaign ==
The first election meeting was held by Taylor on 3 July, who spoke at the Canterbury Hall under the chairmanship of the Mayor of Christchurch, Arthur Rhodes. Turnbull's public meetings commenced on 8 July at the Druids' Hall in Colombo Road in Sydenham. In total, Turnbull held eight public meetings. Smith also commenced his series of public meetings on Monday, 8 July. A total of 23 public meetings were held by the three candidates, as per the table below:

| Date | Smith | Taylor | Turnbull |
|---|---|---|---|
| Wed, 3 July | | Canterbury Hall | |
| Thu, 4 July | | | |
| Fri, 5 July | | | |
| Sat, 6 July | | | |
| Sun, 7 July | | | |
| Mon, 8 July | Foresters' Hall, Vogel Street, Richmond | Druids' Hall, Colombo Road, Sydenham | State School, Waltham |
| Tue, 9 July | State School, Waltham | | Public Library, Knightstown |
| Wed, 10 July | Choral Hall, City | Foresters' Hall, Vogel Street, Richmond | Women's Political Association, Hobb's Building |
| Thu, 11 July | Methodist Schoolroom, Selwyn Street, Addington | Public Library, Knightstown | Theatre Royal, Gloucester Street |
| Fri, 12 July | Public Library, Knightstown | | Merivale Schoolroom |
| Sat, 13 July | | Cathedral Square | |
| Sun, 14 July | | | |
| Mon, 15 July | | Methodist Schoolroom, Selwyn Street, Addington | Foresters' Hall, Vogel Street, Richmond |
| Tue, 16 July | Mission Hall, Sydenham | State School, Waltham | Methodist Schoolroom, Selwyn Street, Addington |
| Wed, 17 July | Methodist Schoolroom, St Albans Lane | Cathedral Square | Druids' Hall, Colombo Road, Sydenham |

There was little political difference between Turnbull and Smith, as both were independent Liberals with fairly similar views. Their only real point of difference was that Smith was a prohibitionist (although much more moderate than Tommy Taylor), whilst Turnbull was in favour of temperance. Charles Taylor, on the other hand, was a staunch advocate for labour interests.

== Results ==
The election was held on 18 July 1901. There were a total of fourteen polling booths throughout the electorate: nine in Christchurch, three in Sydenham, and two in St Albans. When the resignation of Lewis was received, an election official purged the electoral roll that had been compiled for the 1899 general election by several thousand names, and invited people new to the electorate to enrol. With limited time available for enrolment, the final roll had 17,268 names, 4083 fewer than the 1899 electoral roll. Smith beat Charles Taylor and Arthur Hughes Turnbull.

1901 City of Christchurch by-election
| Party | Candidate | Votes | % | ±% |
|---|---|---|---|---|
| Independent Liberal | George John Smith | 3,912 | 40.3% | |
| Liberal–Labour | Charles Taylor | 3,418 | 35.2% | |
| Independent Liberal | Arthur Hughes Turnbull | 2,377 | 24.5% | |
| Majority | | | | |
| Informal votes | | — | — | |
| Turnout | | 9,707 | 55.9% | |
| Registered electors | | 17,355 | | |
