= 1902 New Zealand general election =

1902 general election
- 25 November (general) & 22 December (Māori) 1902

All 80 seats in the New Zealand House of Representatives 41 seats were needed for a majority
- Turnout: 76.7%
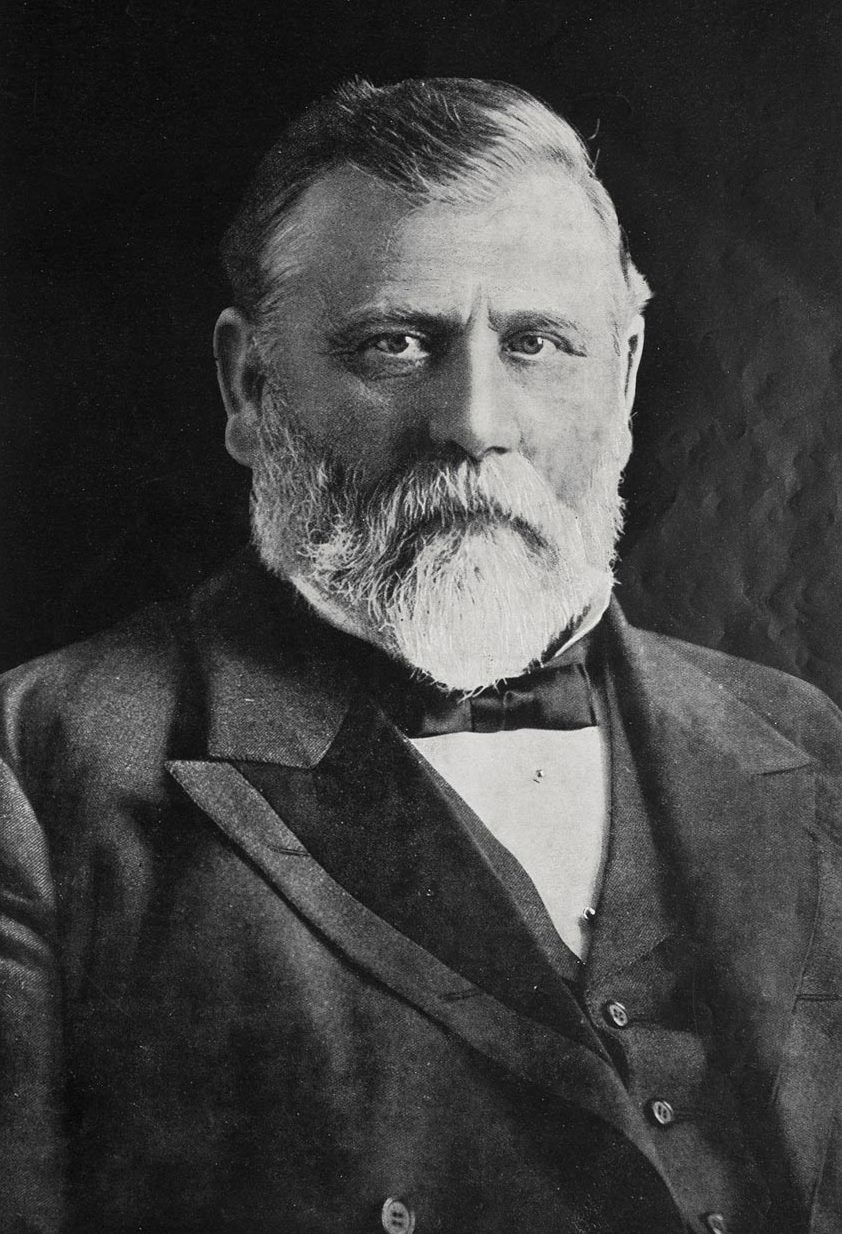

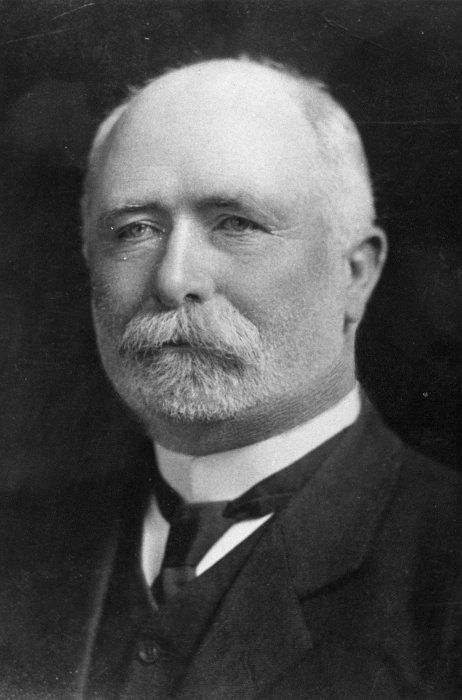
	First party	Second party
Leader	Richard Seddon	William Massey
Party	Liberal	Conservative
Leader since	28 April 1893	3 July 1901 (Note: Massey, the Senior Conservative Whip, served as de facto leader)
Leader's seat	Westland	Franklin
Last election	49 seats	19 seats
Seats won	47	19
Seat change	▼2	Steady
Popular vote	215,378	85,652
Percentage	51.8	20.6
Swing	▼1.9	▼16.0
- Results of the election.
Premier before election
Richard Seddon
Liberal
Subsequent Premier
Richard Seddon
Liberal

The 1902 New Zealand general election was held on Tuesday, 25 November, in the general electorates, and on Monday, 22 December in the Māori electorates to elect a total of 80 MPs to the 15th session of the New Zealand Parliament. A total number of 415,789 (76.7%) voters turned out to vote.

The Rev Frank Isitt was nominated as the Prohibitionist candidate for ten separate electorates, and came second in eight. Another candidate, David Whyte, was nominated for two. Both men stood to ensure that a local liquor licensing poll was held in each electorate for which they were nominated.

== 1902 electoral redistribution ==
The Representation Act 1900 had increased the membership of the House of Representatives from general electorates 70 to 76, and this was implemented through the 1902 electoral redistribution. In 1902, changes to the country quota affected the three-member electorates in the four main centres. The tolerance between electorates was increased to ±1,250 so that the Representation Commissions (since 1896, there had been separate commissions for the North and South Islands) could take greater account of communities of interest. These changes proved very disruptive to existing boundaries. Six electorates were established for the first time: Courtenay, Newtown, Grey Lynn , Hurunui, Oroua, and Kaipara. Two electorates that previously existed were re-established: Mount Ida and Hutt.

This boundary redistribution resulted in the abolition of three electorates:

- Ashley, held by Richard Meredith
- Suburbs of Wellington, held by Thomas Wilford
- Waihemo, held by Thomas Mackenzie

== Results ==
Frank Isitt, a Methodist minister, stood in ten seats as a Prohibition candidate, and came second in eight.

=== Party totals ===
The following table gives party strengths and vote distribution according to Wilson (1985), who records Maori representatives as Independents prior to the 1905 election.

Election results
Party	Candidates	Total votes	Percentage	Seats won	Change
Liberal	105	215,378	51.8	47	-2
Conservative	53	85,652	20.6	19	±0
Independent	54	115,173	27.7	14	+8

=== Votes summary ===
Popular Vote
Liberal	51.8%
Conservative	20.6%
Independents	27.7%

Parliament seats
Liberal	58.75%
Conservative	23.75%
Independents	17.50%

== Electorate results ==
The following are the results of the 1902 general election:

Key

Liberal Conservative Independent Liberal Liberal–Labour Independent

Electorate results for the 1902 New Zealand general election
Electorate	Incumbent	Winner	Majority	Runner up
General electorates
Ashburton	John McLachlan		439	John Studholme
Auckland, City of	William Joseph Napier	Alfred Kidd	934	William Richardson
Auckland, City of	Joseph Witheford		1,515	William Joseph Napier
Auckland, City of	George Fowlds	Frederick Baume	2,282	Arthur Rosser
Avon	William Tanner		58	John Russell Brunt
Awarua	Joseph Ward		1,882	David Whyte
Bay of Islands	Robert Houston		410	Arthur Glass
Bay of Plenty	William Herries		626	David Lundon
Bruce	James Allen		1,113	John Askew Scott
Buller	James Colvin		2,601	Frank Isitt
Caversham	Thomas Sidey		444	William Earnshaw
Chalmers	New electorate	Edmund Allen	612	John White
Christchurch, City of	George John Smith	Tommy Taylor	899	William Collins
Christchurch, City of	Harry Ell		901	George John Smith
Christchurch, City of	William Collins	Thomas Davey	2,233	Arthur Hughes Turnbull
Clutha	James William Thomson		640	Daniel Stewart
Courtenay	New electorate	Charles Lewis	350	John Rennie
Dunedin, City of	Alfred Richard Barclay	Harry Bedford	1,321	Alfred Richard Barclay
Dunedin, City of	John A. Millar		1,321	Alfred Richard Barclay
Dunedin, City of	John A. Millar		3,775	Robert Chisholm
Dunedin, City of	James Arnold		3,775	Robert Chisholm
Eden	John Bollard		1,628	Peter Edward Cheal
Egmont	Walter Symes	Bill Jennings	15	Charles Leech
Ellesmere	Heaton Rhodes		501	Cecil Rhys Thornton
Franklin	William Massey		1,176	Alfred Richard Harris
Geraldine	Frederick Flatman		972	William Maslin
Grey	Arthur Guinness		2,145	Frank Isitt
Grey Lynn	New electorate	George Fowlds	118	Thomas Taylor Masefield
Hawera	Felix McGuire	Charles E. Major	21	Felix McGuire
Hawke's Bay	William Russell		1,443	Frank Isitt
Hurunui	New electorate	Andrew Rutherford	697	Henry Fear Reece
Hutt	New electorate	Thomas Wilford	441	Frederick Pirani
Invercargill	Josiah Hanan		1,508	David Whyte
Kaiapoi	David Buddo		1,256	Alfred Daniel Hassall
Kaipara	New electorate	Alfred Harding	359	John Stallworthy
Lyttelton	George Laurenson		2,172	William Rollitt
Manawatu	John Stevens	Job Vile	176	John Stevens
Manukau	Sir Maurice O'Rorke	Matthew Kirkbride	227	Sir Maurice O'Rorke
Marsden	Robert Thompson	Francis Mander	58	Robert Thompson
Masterton	Alexander Hogg		948	James Christopher Cooper
Mataura	Robert McNab		438	Irven Willis Raymond
Motueka	Roderick McKenzie		1,838	Frank Isitt
Mount Ida	New electorate	Alexander Herdman	131	John Ewing
Napier	Alfred Fraser		1,490	Richard Joseph Eames
Nelson	John Graham		14	Harry Atmore
Newtown	New electorate	William Barber	28	Thomas Hislop
Oamaru	Tom Duncan		880	John Marshall Brown
Ohinemuri	Jackson Palmer	Edward Moss	186	Jackson Palmer
Oroua	New electorate	Frank Lethbridge	613	Arthur Henry Tompkins
Otaki	William Hughes Field		1,510	Frank Isitt
Pahiatua	John O'Meara		337	Samuel Bolton
Palmerston	Frederick Pirani	William Thomas Wood	384	Thomas Rayner Hodder
Parnell	Frank Lawry		124	John Shera
Patea	Frederick Haselden	Walter Symes	451	Frederick Haselden
Rangitikei	Frank Lethbridge	Arthur Remington	247	William John Birch
Riccarton	George Russell	George Witty	285	George Russell
Selwyn	Charles Hardy		543	Joseph Ivess
Taieri	Walter Carncross	Donald Reid	354	John Ramsay
Taranaki	Edward Smith		314	Henry Okey
Thames	James McGowan		885	William Henry Lucas
Timaru	William Hall-Jones		1,651	Frank Smith
Tuapeka	James Bennet		66	Robert Gilkison
Waipawa	Charles Hall		1,568	James Taylor
Waikato	Frederic Lang		225	Henry Greenslade
Waikouaiti	Edmund Allen	Thomas Mackenzie	1,846	Frank Isitt
Wairarapa	J. T. Marryat Hornsby	Wally Buchanan	66	J. T. Marryat Hornsby
Wairau	Charlie Mills		411	John Duncan
Waitaki	William Steward		592	John Campbell
Waitemata	Richard Monk	Ewen Alison	714	Alexander John Hatfield
Waiapu	James Carroll		1,670	Frank Isitt
Wakatipu	William Fraser		449	Bob Ross
Wallace	Michael Gilfedder	John Thomson	793	Michael Gilfedder
Wanganui	Archibald Willis		1,438	James W. Baker
Wellington, City of	John Hutcheson	John Aitken	380	Patrick O'Regan
Wellington, City of	Arthur Atkinson	John Duthie	591	Arthur Atkinson
Wellington, City of	George Fisher		1,921	John Findlay
Westland	Richard Seddon		2,696	Frank Isitt
Māori electorates
Eastern Maori	Wi Pere		614	Pirimi Mataiawhea
Northern Maori	Hone Heke		1,546	Hāmiora Mangakāhia
Southern Maori	Tame Parata		80	Hone Taare Tikao
Western Maori	Henare Kaihau		2,370	Ngarangi Katitia
