= Thomas Davey (New Zealand politician) =

New Zealand politician

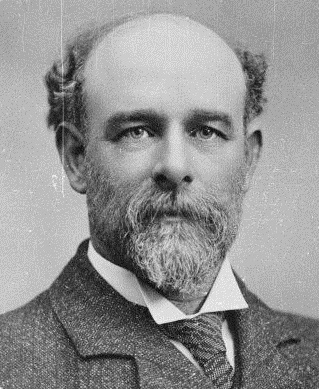
- Thomas Davey

Member of the New Zealand Parliament for Christchurch East
- In office 6 December 1905 – 11 December 1914
- Preceded by: new electorate
- Succeeded by: Henry Thacker

Member of the New Zealand Parliament for City of Christchurch
- In office 25 November 1902 – 6 December 1905
- Preceded by: George John Smith
- Succeeded by: electorate abolished

Personal details
- Born: 1856 Liskeard, England
- Died: 5 April 1934 (aged 77–78)
- Party: Liberal
- Spouse: Maude Davey (née Dobson)
- Profession: Printer

Thomas Henry Davey (1856 – 5 April 1934) was a New Zealand Member of Parliament for the electorates of City of Christchurch and Christchurch East. He is regarded as a member of the Liberal Party, but was critical of aspects of the party and its leadership.

== Early life ==
Davey was born in Liskeard in south east Cornwall, England. He learned the trade of printing.

With his parents, he came to New Zealand in 1874, arriving in Wellington on the Douglass. They lived in Feilding (where he worked as a saw miller), Wellington (where he worked for the Government printer) and then Christchurch. He was a printer for the Lyttelton Times newspaper and became President of the Typographical Union and Vice-President of the Trades and Labour Council.

On 8 August 1884, he married Maude Davey, daughter of John Dobson (surveyor) from Oxford.

== Member of Parliament ==
New Zealand Parliament
Years	Term	Electorate	Party
1902–1905	15th	Christchurch	Liberal
1905–1908	16th	Christchurch East	Liberal
1908–1911	17th	Christchurch East	Liberal
1911–1914	18th	Christchurch East	Liberal

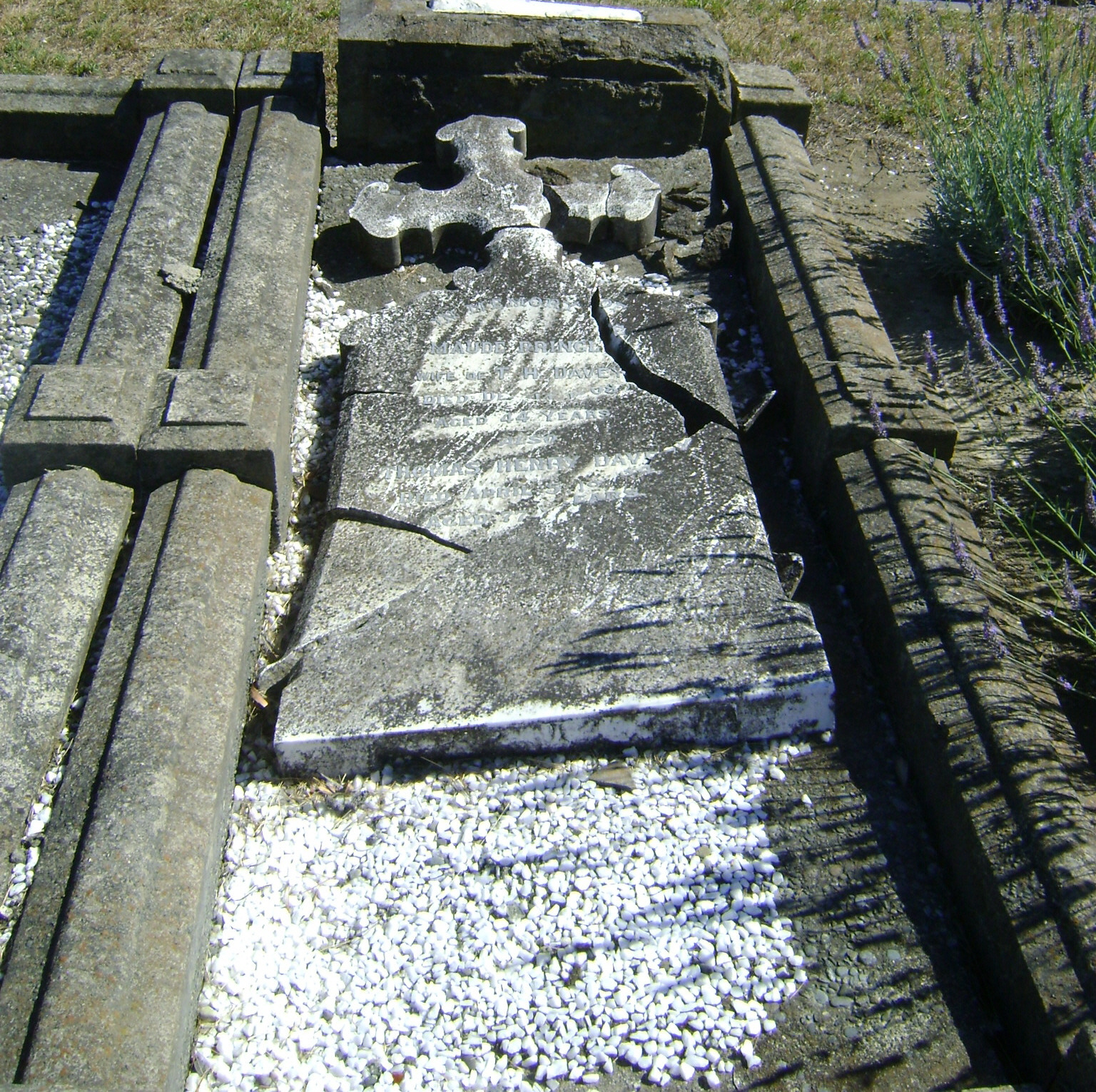
Headstone for Thomas Davey

From between the general elections of 1902 and 1905, Davey was one of the three members of parliament representing the multi-member City of Christchurch electorate. He had been presented with a petition to stand for parliament and came third out of nine contenders in this three-member electorate, behind Tommy Taylor and Harry Ell.

In 1905, these multi-member electorates were split up, and he won the Christchurch East electorate against three other contenders: William Whitehouse Collins (who had previously been in Parliament for the Liberal Party), Henry Toogood (a young engineer who only recently left Canterbury College and who would become one of the founding members of the Institution of Professional Engineers New Zealand), and Frederick Cooke (a prominent member of the Socialist Party).

Davey held Christchurch East to 1914, when he retired.

Like Harry Ell, Davey showed an independent attitude towards the Liberal Government. He demanded an elective executive, and said that Premier Richard Seddon held too many portfolios. He also believed that the Cabinet should be reconstructed. Nonetheless, Davey is listed as a member of the Liberal Party in Wilson's New Zealand Parliamentary Record : 1840–1984.

Davey was elected Mayor of St Albans in 1897. He was a member of the Hospital Board and the Board of Canterbury College.

The Lyttelton Times parliamentary correspondent described Davey as: "tall, straight, solidly built – the best Mayor St. Albans ever had".

== Death ==
Davey died on 5 April 1934 and was buried at Linwood Cemetery.

New Zealand Parliament
Preceded by Harry Ell, George John Smith, William Whitehouse Collins	Member of Parliament for Christchurch; 1902–1905; Served alongside: Harry Ell and Tommy Taylor (1902–1905)	Constituency abolished
In abeyance Title last held by Jerningham Wakefield	Member of Parliament for Christchurch East; 1905–1914	Succeeded by Henry Thacker
