= Ted Taylor (politician) =

New Zealand lawyer, diplomat (1906–1982)

Edward Bickmore Ellison Taylor OBE (1 June 1906 – 5 May 1982), also known as E. B. E. Taylor, was a New Zealand lawyer, politician and diplomat. He was New Zealand Ambassador to Japan from 1961 to 1965.

He was born in Christchurch, the son of Liberal and prohibitionist mayor and MP Tommy Taylor and his wife, social reformer Elizabeth Taylor. He was educated at Christchurch Boys' High School and Canterbury College, graduating in law (LLB).

Between 1935 and 1961, he practised law in Greymouth, Taumarunui and Christchurch. He was the Christchurch coroner for 26 years from 1952 to 1978 (except while he was in Japan). He was active in the National Party and was Canterbury divisional chairman from 1946 to 1950. He was the National candidate for Westland in 1938 and Lyttelton in 1943 and 1946.

Taylor was on the Canterbury University Council (then Canterbury College) from 1950 to 1961 and served as pro-chancellor in 1960 and 1961. He was a member of Christchurch City Council from the 1968 local election for one three-year term and was defeated at the 1971 local elections when he stood for re-election. He was president of the Canterbury District Law Society in 1959. In the 1978 New Year Honours, he was appointed an Officer of the Order of the British Empire, for public services. He was described by Gustafson as "a delightful extrovert and raconteur."

He married twice; in 1934 in London to Hilda Esther Bower, and in 1939 to Gertrude Mary Duthie after his first wife died.
