= Newtown (New Zealand electorate) =

Newtown was a parliamentary electorate in Wellington, New Zealand, from 1902 to 1908.

== Population centres ==
The Representation Act 1900 had increased the membership of the House of Representatives from general electorates 70 to 76, and this was implemented through the 1902 electoral redistribution. In 1902, changes to the country quota affected the three-member electorates in the four main centres. The tolerance between electorates was increased to ±1,250 so that the Representation Commissions (since 1896, there had been separate commissions for the North and South Islands) could take greater account of communities of interest. These changes proved very disruptive to existing boundaries, and six electorates were established for the first time, including Newtown, and two electorates that previously existed were re-established.

The electorate was based on the inner city suburb of Newtown.

== History ==
The electorate was represented by one Member of Parliament, William Henry Peter Barber.

The 1902 election was contested by Barber, Thomas William Hislop, Charles Luke, William Chapple and William George Tustin. They received 1385, 1357, 1100, 1017, and 159 votes, respectively. John Crewes had initially also contested the election, but he withdrew his nomination before polling day.

The 1905 election was contested by Barber, Thomas William Hislop, William Chapple and Alfred Hindmarsh. They received 3231, 2018, 1795, and 383 votes, respectively.

=== Members of Parliament ===
Newtown was represented by one Member of Parliament, William Barber.

Key

Liberal New Liberal

Election	Winner
1902 election	William Barber
1905 election	William Barber
(Electorate abolished in 1908; see Wellington South)

=== 1905 election ===
1905 general election: Newtown
Party	Candidate	Votes	%	±%
Liberal	William Barber	3,231	42.87	+15.27
Conservative	Thomas William Hislop	2,018	26.78	−0.26
Independent Liberal	William Chapple	1,795	23.82	+3.56
Ind. Labour League	Alfred Hindmarsh	383	5.08	
Majority		1,213	16.09	+15.54
Informal votes		108	1.43	
Turnout		7,535	84.13	
Registered electors		8,956		

=== 1902 election ===
1902 general election: Newtown
Party	Candidate	Votes	%	±%
Liberal	William Barber	1,385	27.60	
Conservative	Thomas William Hislop	1,357	27.04	
Liberal	Charles Luke	1,100	21.92	
Independent Liberal	William Chapple	1,017	20.26	
Conservative	William George Tustin	159	3.16	
Majority		28	0.55	
Turnout		5,018	75.28	
Registered electors		6,665		

== Bibliography ==
- McRobie, Alan (1989). Electoral Atlas of New Zealand. Wellington: GP Books. ISBN 0-477-01384-8.
- Scholefield, Guy (1950) [First published in 1913]. New Zealand Parliamentary Record, 1840–1949 (3rd ed.). Wellington: Govt. Printer.
- Wilson, Jim (1985) [First published in 1913]. New Zealand Parliamentary Record, 1840–1984 (4th ed.). Wellington: V.R. Ward, Govt. Printer. OCLC 154283103.
