= William Collins (New Zealand member of parliament) =

New Zealand politician (1853–1923)

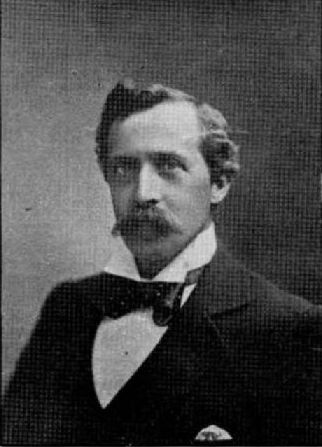
- William Whitehouse Collins

Member of Parliament for City of Christchurch
- In office 1893–1896
- Preceded by: Richard Molesworth Taylor
- Succeeded by: Harry Ell
- In office 1899–1902
- Preceded by: Harry Ell
- Succeeded by: Harry Ell

Personal details
- Born: William Whitehouse Collins; 4 September 1853 Harborne
- Died: 12 April 1923 (aged 69) Sydney
- Party: Liberal Party
- Spouse(s): Alice Annie Collins (née Skinner, m. 1886)

William Whitehouse Collins (4 September 1853 – 12 April 1923) was a New Zealand Member of Parliament for Christchurch in the South Island.

== Early life ==
Collins was born on 4 September 1853 in Harborne, Staffordshire, England and came to New Zealand in 1890. He married Alice Annie Skinner, a daughter of Ehenezer Skinner of Sydney, in 1886.

== Member of Parliament ==
New Zealand Parliament
| Years | Term | Electorate | Party |
|---|---|---|---|
| 1893–1896 | 12th | Christchurch | Liberal |
| 1899–1902 | 14th | Christchurch | Liberal |

Collins represented the City of Christchurch electorate in the House of Representatives from 1893 to 1896 and again between 1899 and 1902. He also stood in the 1896 election, but was narrowly defeated.

He was a rationalist (free-thought) lecturer and was involved with the English Secularists and obtained a diploma from the National Secular Society.

The Canterbury Freethought Association was established in Christchurch in 1881 and ran until 1917. Collins left for Sydney in 1918 and died there on 12 April 1923.

New Zealand Parliament
| Preceded by Ebenezer Sandford, William Pember Reeves, Richard Molesworth Taylor | Member of Parliament for Christchurch; 1893–1896; 1899–1902; Served alongside: George John Smith (1893–1896, 1901–1902), William Pember Reeves (1893–1896), Charles Lewis (1896, 1899–1901), Harry Ell (1899–1902), | Succeeded by George John Smith, Charles Lewis, Tommy Taylor |
| Preceded by George John Smith, Charles Lewis, Tommy Taylor | Member of Parliament for Christchurch; 1893–1896; 1899–1902; Served alongside: George John Smith (1893–1896, 1901–1902), William Pember Reeves (1893–1896), Charles Lewis (1896, 1899–1901), Harry Ell (1899–1902), | Succeeded by Harry Ell, Thomas Davey, Tommy Taylor |
