= Elizabeth Taylor (social reformer) =

Prominent member of women's suffrage movement in New Zealand

Elizabeth Taylor OBE JP
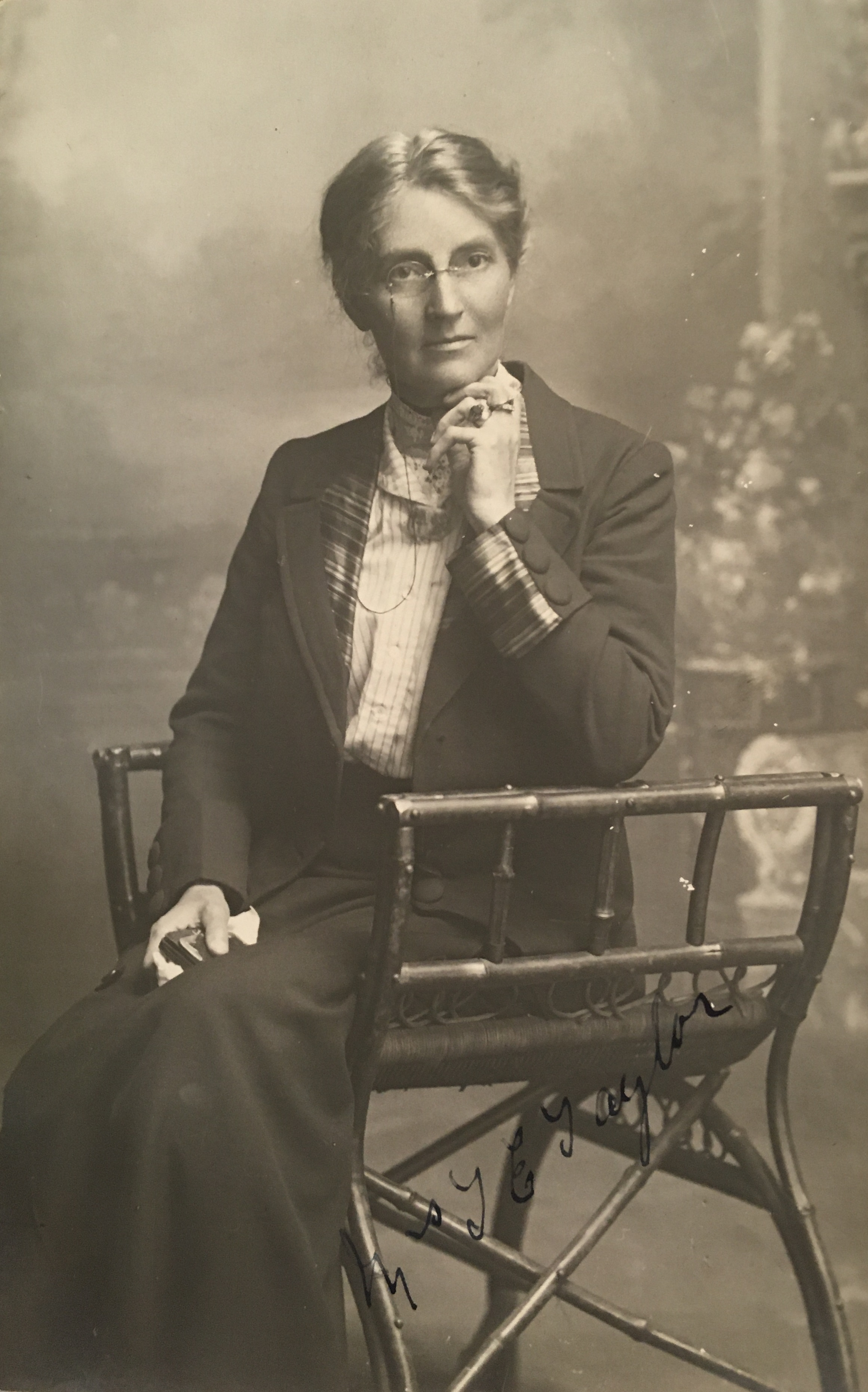
- Born: Elizabeth Best Ellison; 21 September 1868; Lyttelton, New Zealand
- Died: 27 April 1941 (aged 72); Dunedin, New Zealand
- Known for: Humanitarian works, international peace and temperance activism
- Spouse: Tommy Taylor (m. 1892; died 1911)
- Children: Five daughters and one son
- Relatives: Ted Taylor (son)

Elizabeth Best Taylor OBE JP (née Ellison; 21 September 1868 – 27 April 1941) was a New Zealand temperance worker, community leader and social reformer. She was president of the Women's Christian Temperance Union New Zealand (WCTU NZ) from 1926 to 1935; and was one of New Zealand's first justices of the peace.

Elizabeth Best Ellison was born in Lyttelton, New Zealand, in 1868. She briefly taught at the Christchurch Normal School. She married Thomas Edward Taylor in 1892 and they had six children.

Taylor was a founding member of the National Council of Women of New Zealand in 1896; and, she represented the WCTU NZ at the Pan-Pacific Conference in Honolulu in 1928, later becoming president of the Dominion Pan-Pacific Women's Association.

In the 1937 Coronation Honours, Taylor was appointed an Officer of the Order of the British Empire, for social welfare services.

Taylor died in Dunedin on 27 April 1941, and she is buried near her husband in the Addington Cemetery in Christchurch.
