= Ebenezer Sandford =

New Zealand politician

Ebenezer Sandford (1848 – 17 December 1897) was a New Zealand Member of Parliament, representing the City of Christchurch electorate in 1891–1893.

== Biography ==
New Zealand Parliament
| Years | Term | Electorate | Party |
|---|---|---|---|
| 1891–1893 | 11th | City of Christchurch | Liberal–Labour |

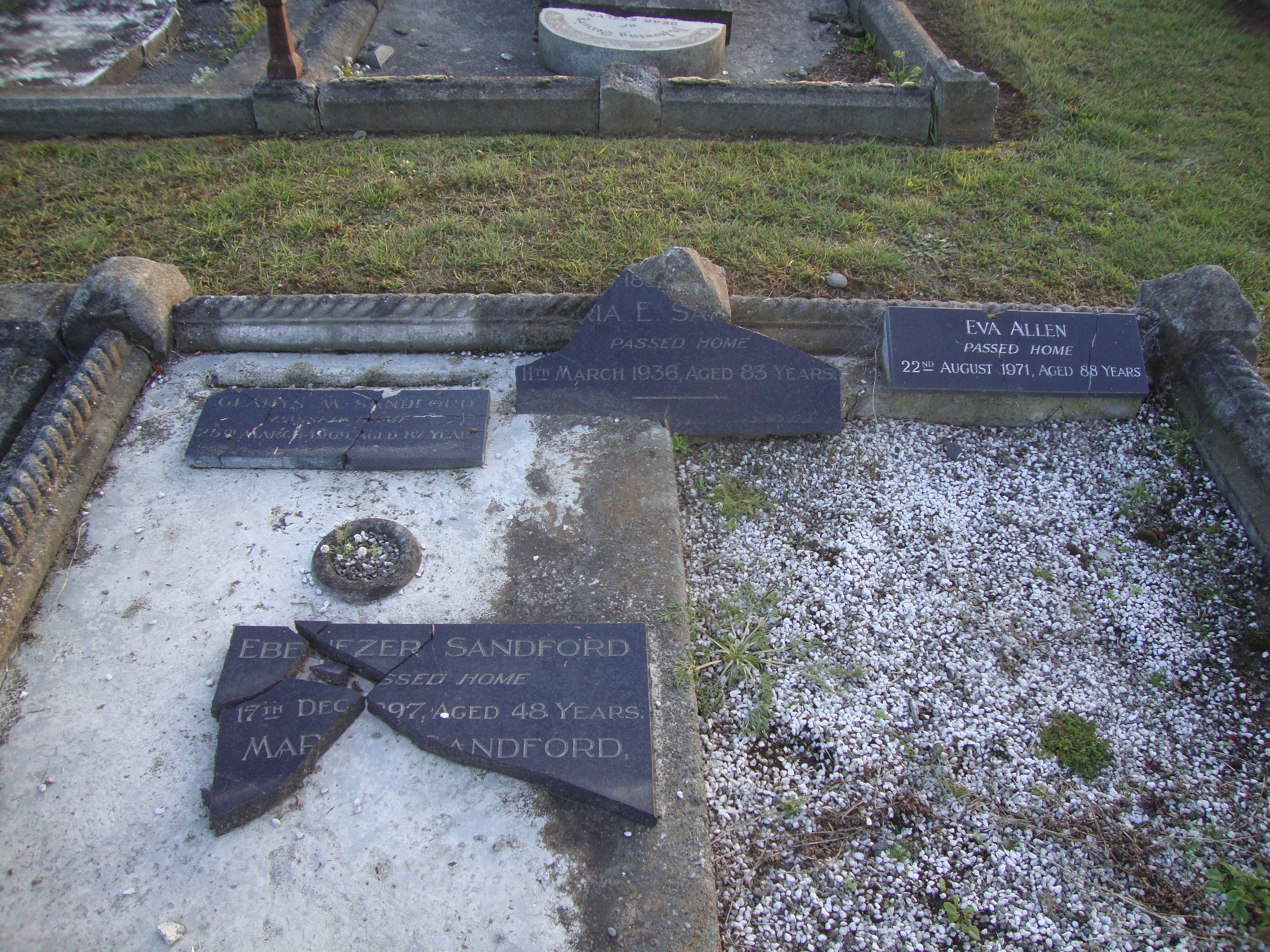
Grave of Ebenezer Sandford and family at Linwood Cemetery

Sandford was born in 1848. He arrived in Port Chalmers on the Peter Denny on 26 July 1874 from London with his wife and two young children. They lived in Mornington near Dunedin, then Arrowtown followed by Invercargill. He came to Christchurch in the mid-1880s.

In Arrowtown, he worked for the Arrowtown Observer. In Christchurch, he was a compositor for the Lyttelton Times.

Sandford contested the 1891 by-election for the City of Christchurch electorate against John Tippett Smith and Eden George. Sandford came first with 1851 votes, representing a majority of 742 votes. Smith and George received 1109 and 637 votes, respectively. George petitioned against the election, arguing that the nominations for Sandford and Smith were received too late by the returning officer, and he was thus the only person who could have been declared elected. The elections petitions court found that whilst the returning officer had made an error, the subsequent election was valid and the petition had to be dismissed.

Sandford died on 17 December 1897 and was buried at Linwood Cemetery. His last residence was in Queen Street (since renamed to Queensbury Street) in Burwood. He was survived by his wife (Maria Eliza Sandford, née Sharp, d. 11 March 1936) and seven children.

New Zealand Parliament
| Preceded by Westby Perceval, William Pember Reeves, Richard Molesworth Taylor | Member of Parliament for Christchurch; 1891–1893; Served alongside: William Pember Reeves, Richard Molesworth Taylor | Succeeded by George John Smith, William Pember Reeves, William Whitehouse Collins |
