= Charles Lewis (New Zealand politician) =

New Zealand politician

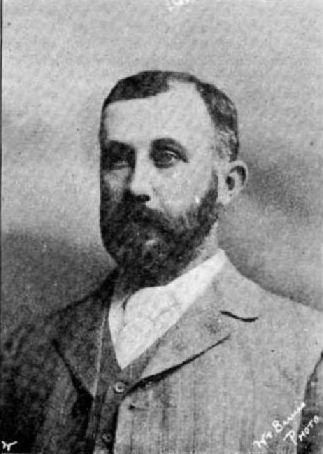
- Portrait of Charles Lewis

Member of the New Zealand Parliament for City of Christchurch
- In office 13 February 1896 – 1901
- Preceded by: William Pember Reeves
- Succeeded by: George John Smith

Member of the New Zealand Parliament for Courtenay
- In office 1902–1908
- Preceded by: new electorate
- Succeeded by: electorate abolished

Personal details
- Born: 21 September 1857 Christchurch
- Died: 28 November 1927 (aged 70)
- Party: a

Charles Lewis (21 September 1857 – 28 November 1927) was an independent conservative Member of Parliament in New Zealand.

== Early life ==
Lewis was born in Christchurch on 21 September 1857. His father, David Lewis, was a farmer in Halswell and one of the early settlers of Canterbury. On 25 December 1856, his father had married Annie Gould, a sister of George Gould (G. Gould's son, also George Gould, would thus be Lewis' cousin). His mother Annie died in February 1860 when Lewis was two years old. Lewis attended Christ's College in his home city, and Clifton and Malvern Colleges in England. Upon his return to New Zealand in 1874, he was employed as a farmer in Springfield, Ellesmere, and Brookside, until he inherited his father's farm in Halswell upon his death in 1874.

== Political career ==
New Zealand Parliament
| Years | Term | Electorate | Party |
|---|---|---|---|
| 1896 | 12th | City of Christchurch | Independent |
| 1896–1899 | 13th | City of Christchurch | Independent |
| 1899–1901 | 14th | City of Christchurch | Independent |
| 1902–1905 | 15th | Courtenay | Independent |
| 1905–1908 | 16th | Courtenay | Independent |

Lewis was a member of various local bodies, most importantly the Halswell Road Board. In the 1890 election, he was secretary to the election committee of William Rolleston, who stood in the Halswell electorate that year. Lewis himself was asked to stand in rural electorates in 1890 and 1893, but he refused; partially because of a weak constitution of his health.

When William Pember Reeves' appointment as Agent-General to the United Kingdom caused a vacancy in the City of Christchurch electorate, Lewis was on the committee of the National Association (i.e. the opposition) and was part of a small majority that decided that the resulting 1896 by-election should be contested by conservative interests. Together with two others, he was tasked with finding a suitable candidate, and it was him who informed the print media that a conservative candidate would stand. No candidate being found, Lewis saved the situation by consenting to become the candidate himself. Due to vote splitting between liberal candidates, he unexpectedly won the 13 February 1896 by-election.

Lewis was confirmed by the voters in the 1896 and 1899 general elections, but as he had predicted, he found the parliamentary work demanding to his health. At the time, sessions regularly extended into the evening or the early morning, sometimes even all night. He missed the last week of the session in 1900 due to exhaustion. During the parliamentary recess, Lewis invited the electorate to a meeting on 3 June 1901 to present his views for the upcoming session. Queen Victoria had died earlier in the year, and the royal tour of Prince George, Duke of Cornwall and York and his wife Mary were about to visit Christchurch, and as The Press noted, there was little interest in politics at the time. Consequently, the speech was poorly attended—only about 60 people turned up—and Lewis was so disappointed about the lack of support by the constituency that on 7 June, he sent his resignation to the Speaker of the House. The resulting by-election was won by George John Smith.

Lewis then represented the Courtenay electorate in Canterbury from 1902 to 1908, when he retired.

== Other interests ==
Lewis had a number of race horses that at times were successful at winning. He was a committee member of the Canterbury A&P Association. He was on the board of governors of Canterbury College and from 1904 to 1907, he was the board's chairman.

== Death ==
Lewis retired to Waipukurau, in the North Island and "died there by his own hand on 28 November 1927. He was nervous and ill at the time".

== Notes ==
New Zealand Parliament
| Preceded by William Pember Reeves | Member of Parliament for Christchurch; 1896–1901; Served alongside: William Whitehouse Collins (1896, 1899–1901), George John Smith and Tommy Taylor (1896–1899), Harry Ell (1899–1901) | Succeeded by George John Smith |
Academic offices
| Preceded by Arthur Rhodes | Chairman of the Board of Governors of Canterbury College; 1904–1907 | Succeeded by George Warren Russell |
