= Harry Ell =

New Zealand politician (1862–1934)

The Honourable Harry Ell
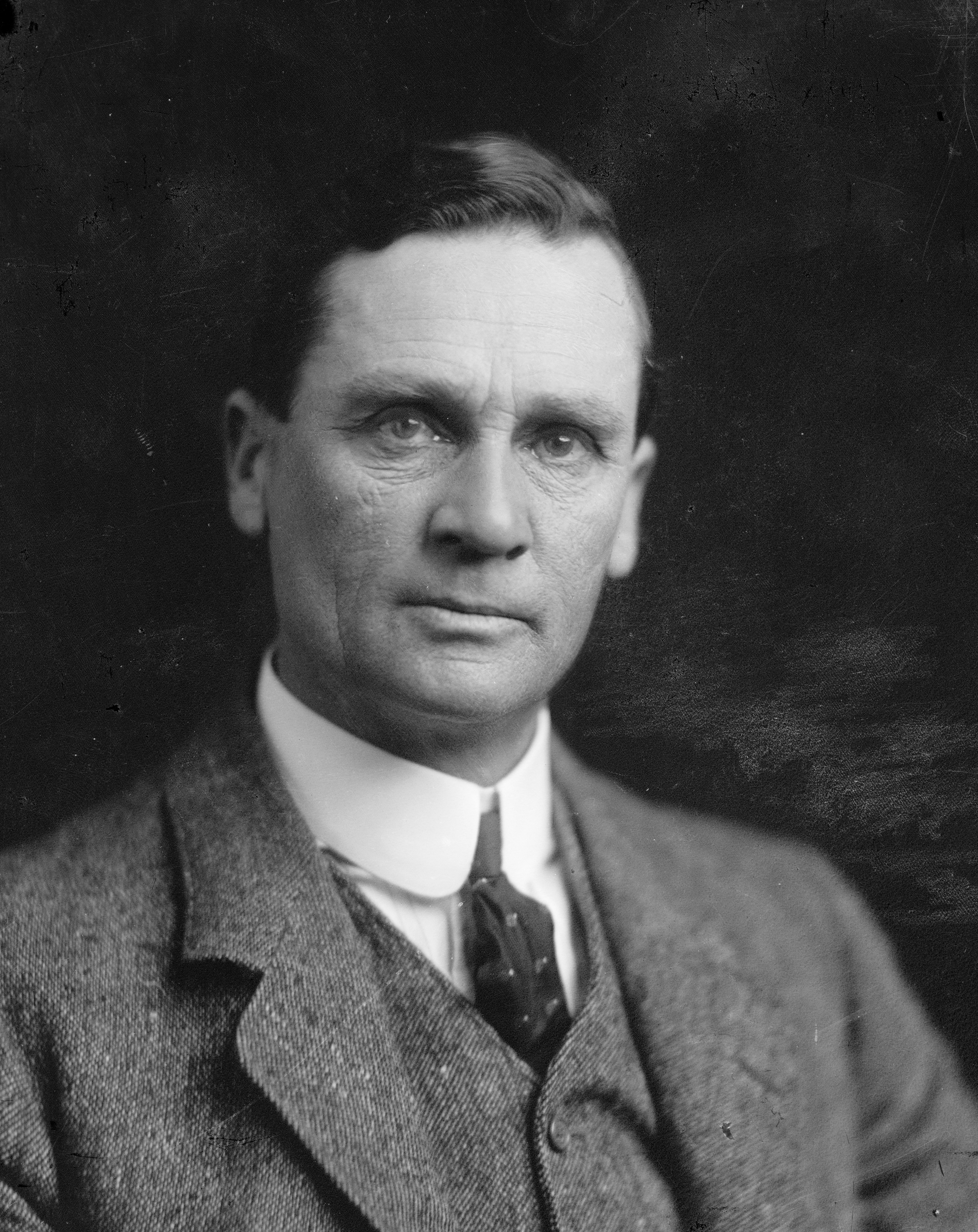
- Harry Ell in October 1914

Christchurch City councillor
- In office 1903–1903
- In office 1917–1919

Member of Parliament for City of Christchurch electorate
- In office 1899–1905
- Preceded by: George John Smith
- Succeeded by: electorate discontinued

Member of Parliament for Christchurch South
- In office 1905–1919
- Preceded by: new electorate
- Succeeded by: Ted Howard

Personal details
- Born: Henry George Ell; 24 September 1862 Christchurch, New Zealand
- Died: 27 June 1934 (aged 71) Christchurch, New Zealand
- Party: Independent Liberal
- Other political affiliations: New Liberal Party
- Spouse: Adelaide Eleanor Gee

Henry George Ell (probably 24 September 1862 – 27 June 1934), commonly known as Harry Ell, was a Christchurch City councillor and a New Zealand Member of Parliament. He is famous for his conservation work around Christchurch's Port Hills, his advocacy for the Summit Road, and his construction of the Sign of the Takahe and other road houses along the Summit Road.

== Early years ==
Ell was born in Christchurch, New Zealand, and grew up on his father's farm in Halswell. As a teenager he worked at the Canterbury Museum, then as a farm hand. Between 1881 and 1884 he was a member of the Armed Constabulary in Taranaki, where he participated in the destruction of Parihaka. This experience turned him into a stern critic of the race-relations policies of the time.

Ell was a Christchurch City councillor in 1903 and then again between 1917 and 1919. He was a member of the Knights of Labour and the Canterbury Liberal Association. He married Adelaide Eleanor Gee in Christchurch on 10 January 1892, and in 1912 named a hill above Governor's Bay Mount Ada after her.

== Member of Parliament ==
New Zealand Parliament
Years	Term	Electorate	Party
1899–1902	14th	City of Christchurch	Independent Liberal
1902–1905	15th	City of Christchurch	Liberal
1905–1908	16th	Christchurch South	Liberal
1908–1911	17th	Christchurch South	Independent Liberal
1911–1914	18th	Christchurch South	Liberal
1914–1919	19th	Christchurch South	Liberal

Ell stood as a prohibitionist for a seat in the City of Christchurch electorate in 1896. He was unsuccessful, coming fifth in the three-member electorate, but was elected as an independent Liberal in the 1899 general election. He held the seat, and the subsequent seat of Christchurch South as an independent, until the 1919 general election. Ell stood for the Lyttelton electorate, which contained the Port Hills. He was defeated and did not win a seat in Parliament again.

Ell was associated with the New Liberal Party in 1905.

From 1910 until 1912 he was the Liberal Party's junior whip.

As a Member of the House of Representatives, Ell spoke against the relaxation of liquor laws, the jailing of alcoholics and against gambling. He also successfully pushed for reform of New Zealand's mental health laws. He served briefly as Postmaster General in the Cabinet of Thomas Mackenzie.

== The Summit Road rest houses ==
Ell is most remembered for his strong interest in recreation and conservation. From 1900 onwards, Ell pushed for the creation of a network of scenic reserves along Christchurch's Port Hills, linked by the Summit Road and with a network of rest-houses to allow travellers and walkers to refresh themselves. Three of these rest-houses, designed by architect Samuel Hurst Seager, were completed during Ell's lifetime: the Sign of the Bellbird, Sign of the Kiwi, and Sign of the Packhorse. The last, and grandest, the Sign of the Takahe, was not completed until long after Ell's death, in 1949. All four houses were built of local stone, and designed to blend in with the landscape. The Sign of the Kiwi and Sign of the Takahe still function as commercial rest stops serving refreshments while the Sign of the Bellbird survives only as a shelter, but is still a useful stopping place for a picnic and the starting point for some short walks. The Sign of the Packhorse is managed by the Department of Conservation and used as a hut by trampers.

== Quotes ==
- Ell's political philosophy was simple: "Our aim in life is to effect such social and economic reforms as will improve the lot of our fellow men and women".
- As a parliamentarian, Ell was proud of his independent status. During his 1899 election campaign he maintained the view that: "a member should pledge himself to the people, not to party or to Prime Minister.".
Harry Ell picture gallery
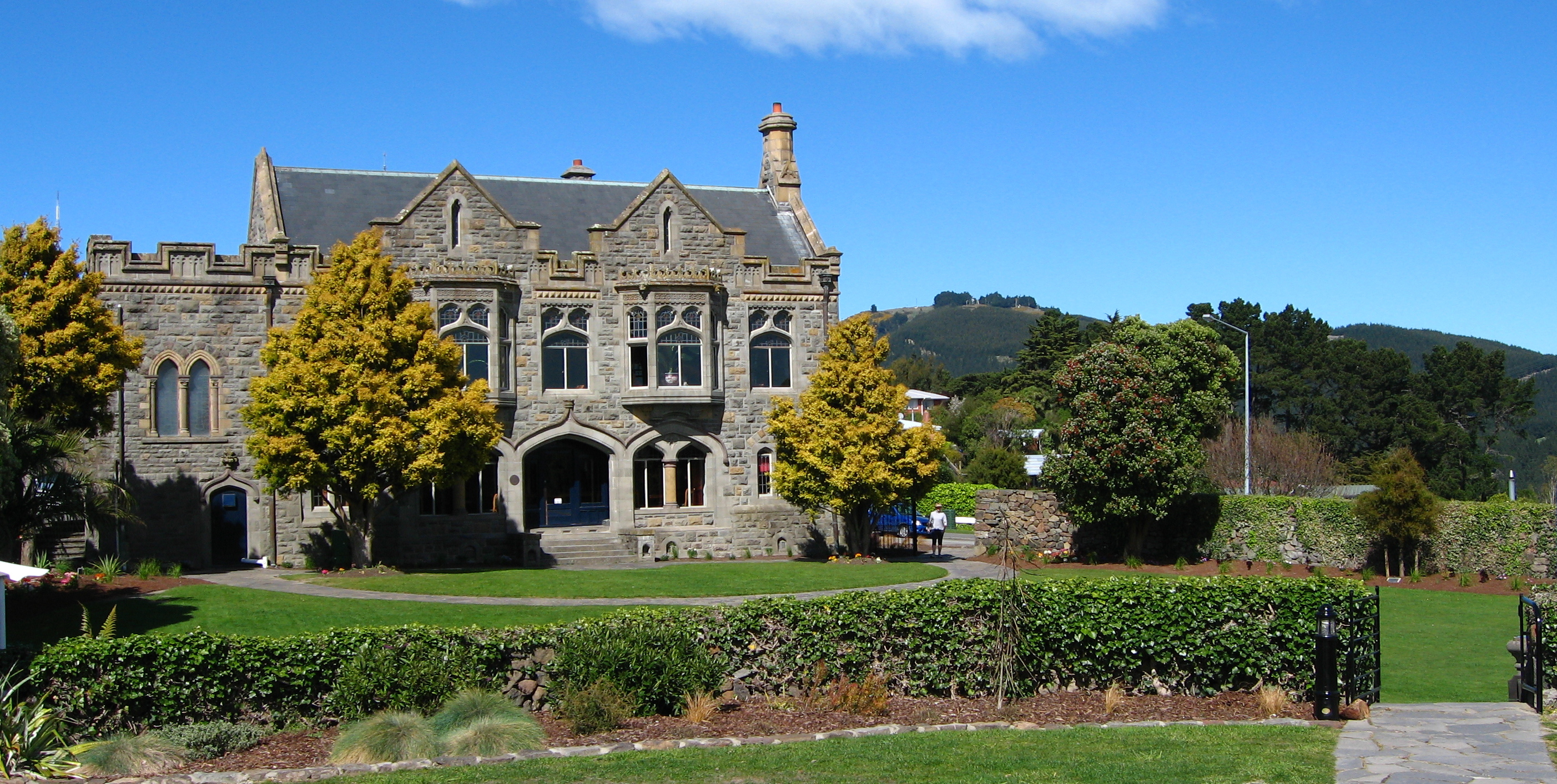
The Sign of the Takahe, one of Ell's achievements

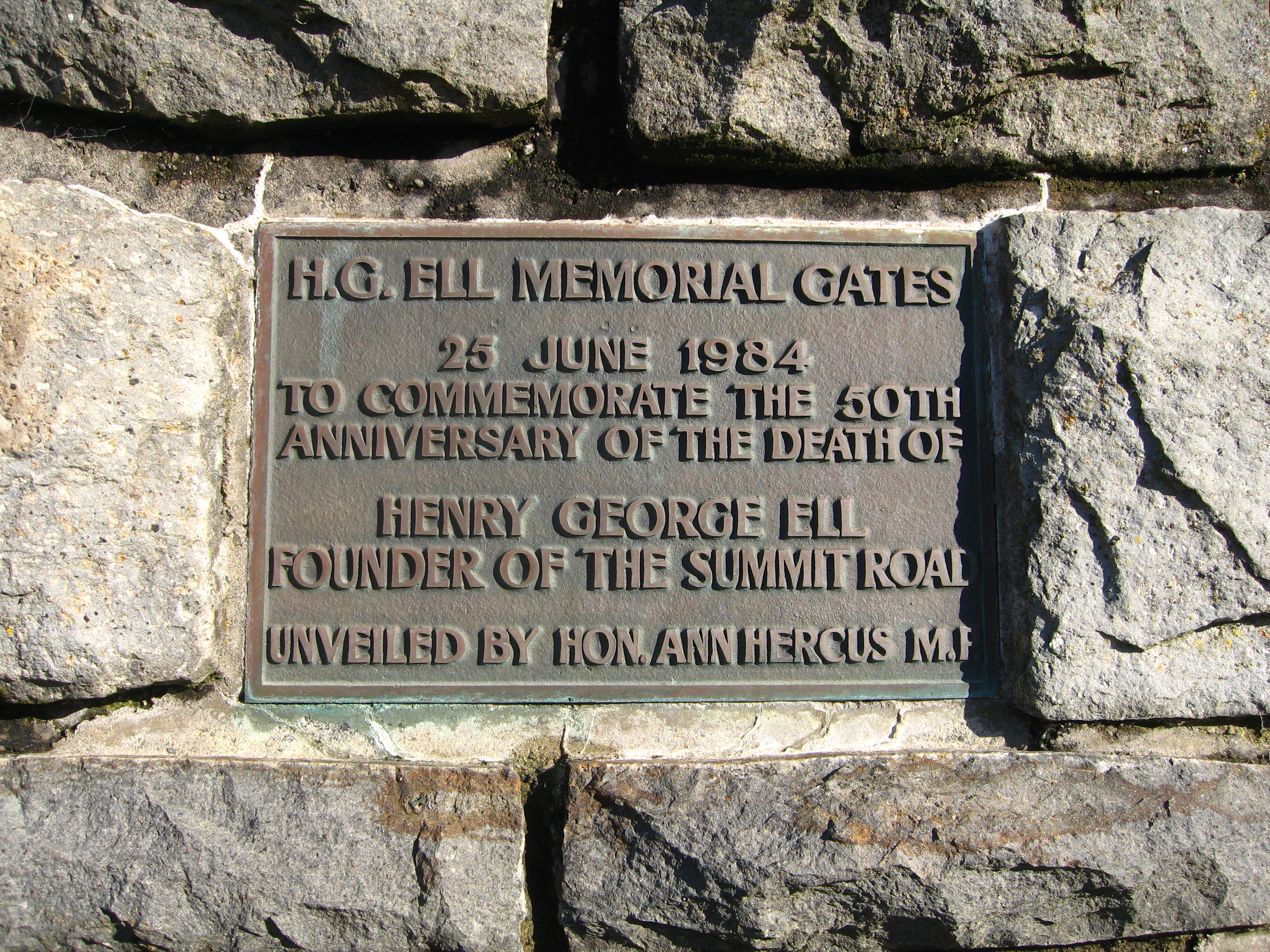
Plaque commemorating Harry Ell at the Sign of the Takahe

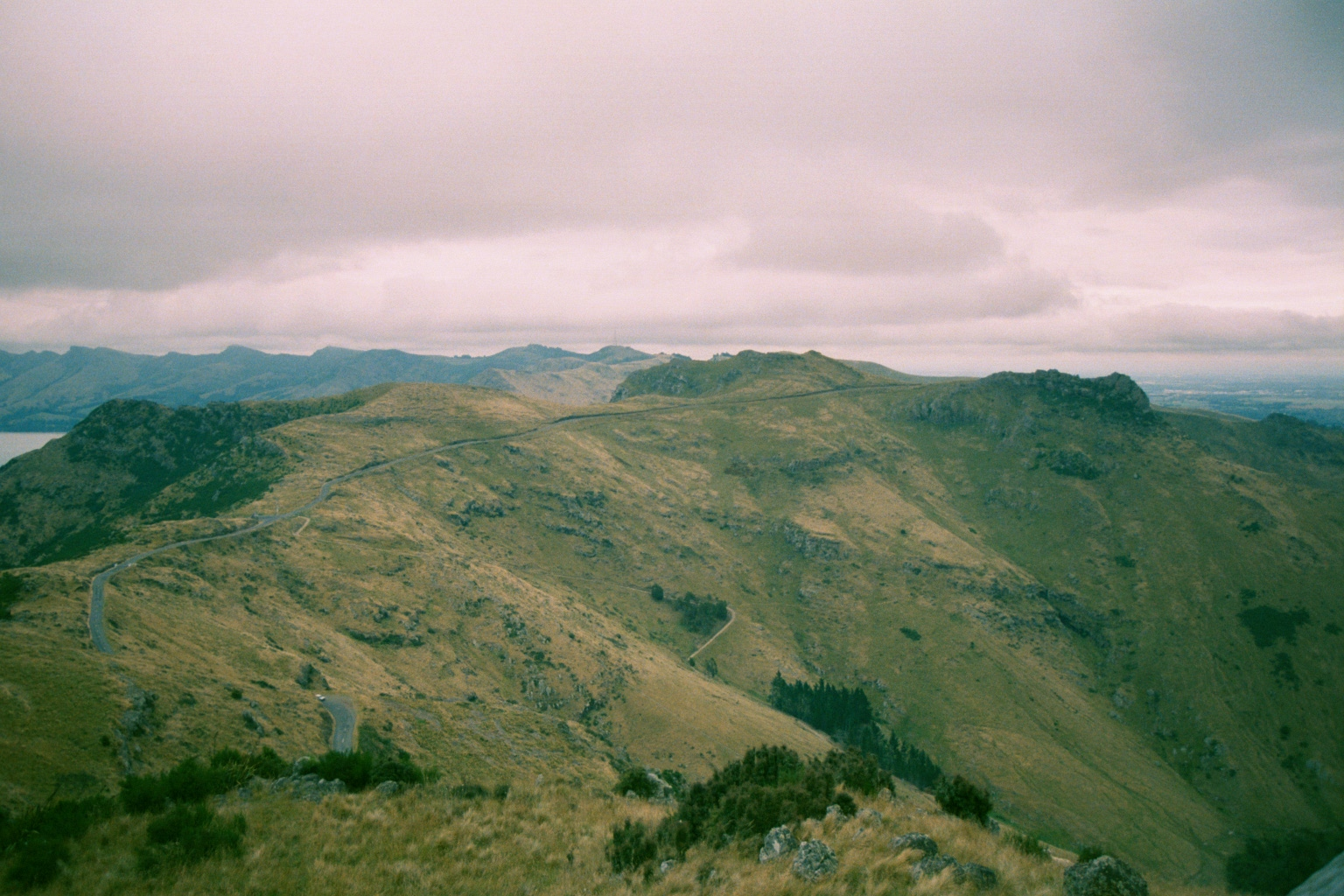
View of part of the Summit Road

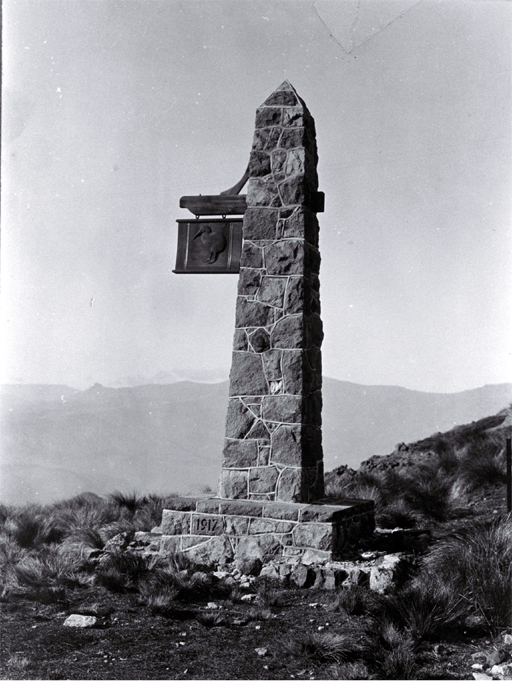
Plinth of the Sign of the Kiwi, Dyers Pass, Port Hills, Christchurch

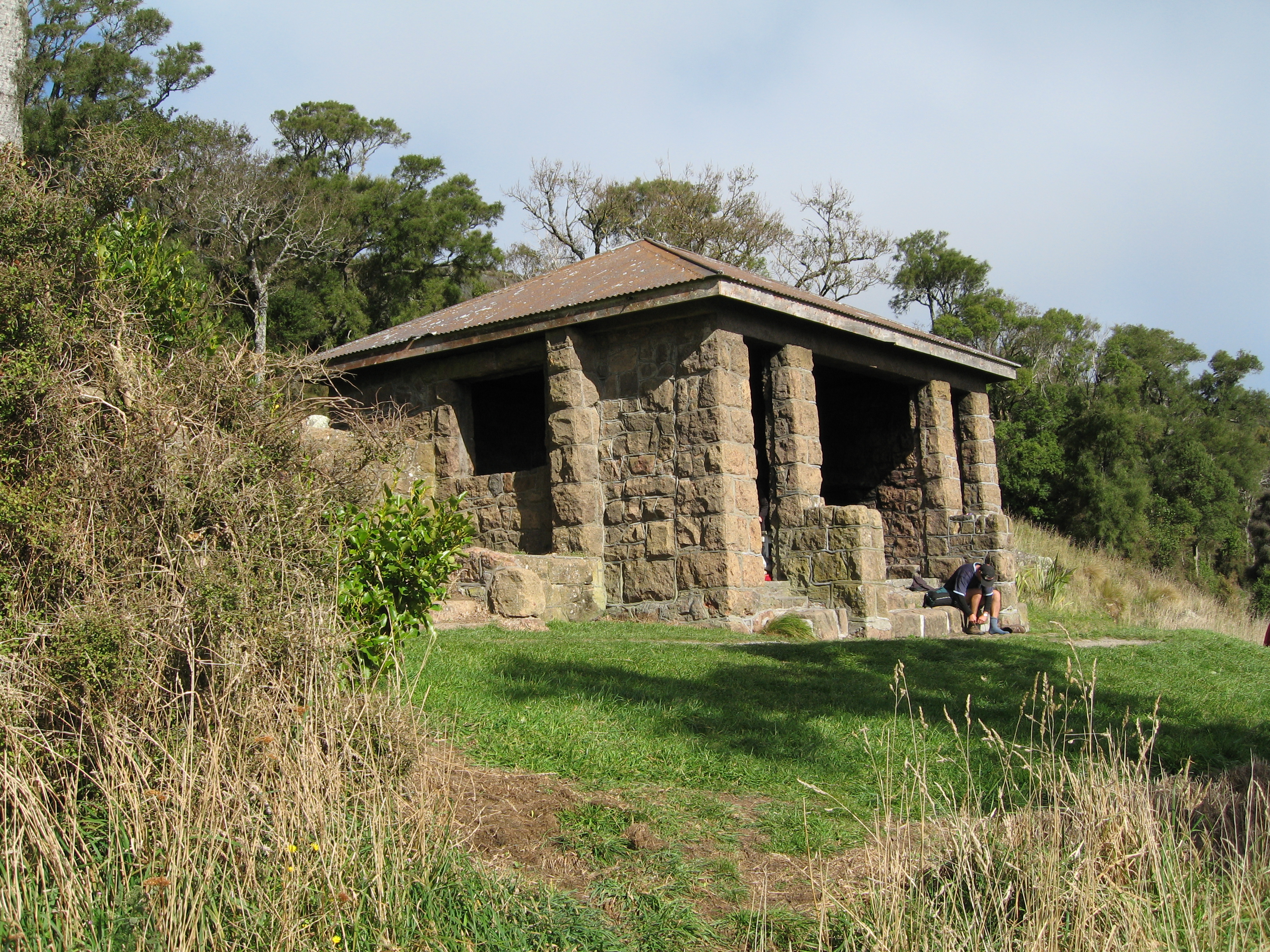
The partially restored ruins of the Sign of the Bellbird gallery

== Notes ==
Political offices
Preceded by Joseph Ward	Postmaster-General and Minister of Telegraphs; 1912	Succeeded by Heaton Rhodes
New Zealand Parliament
Preceded by George John Smith, Charles Lewis, Tommy Taylor	Member of Parliament for Christchurch; 1899–1905; Served alongside: Charles Lewis (1899–1901), William Whitehouse Collins (1899–1902), George John Smith (1901–1902), Thomas Davey and Tommy Taylor (1902–1905)	Constituency abolished
In abeyance Title last held by Westby Perceval	Member of Parliament for Christchurch South; 1905–1919	Succeeded by Ted Howard
