= 1896 City of Christchurch by-election =

New Zealand by-election

1896 Christchurch by-election
- 13 February 1896
- Turnout: 12,293
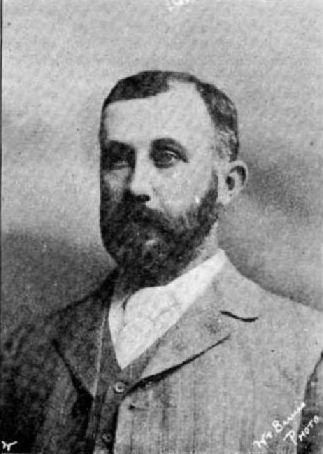

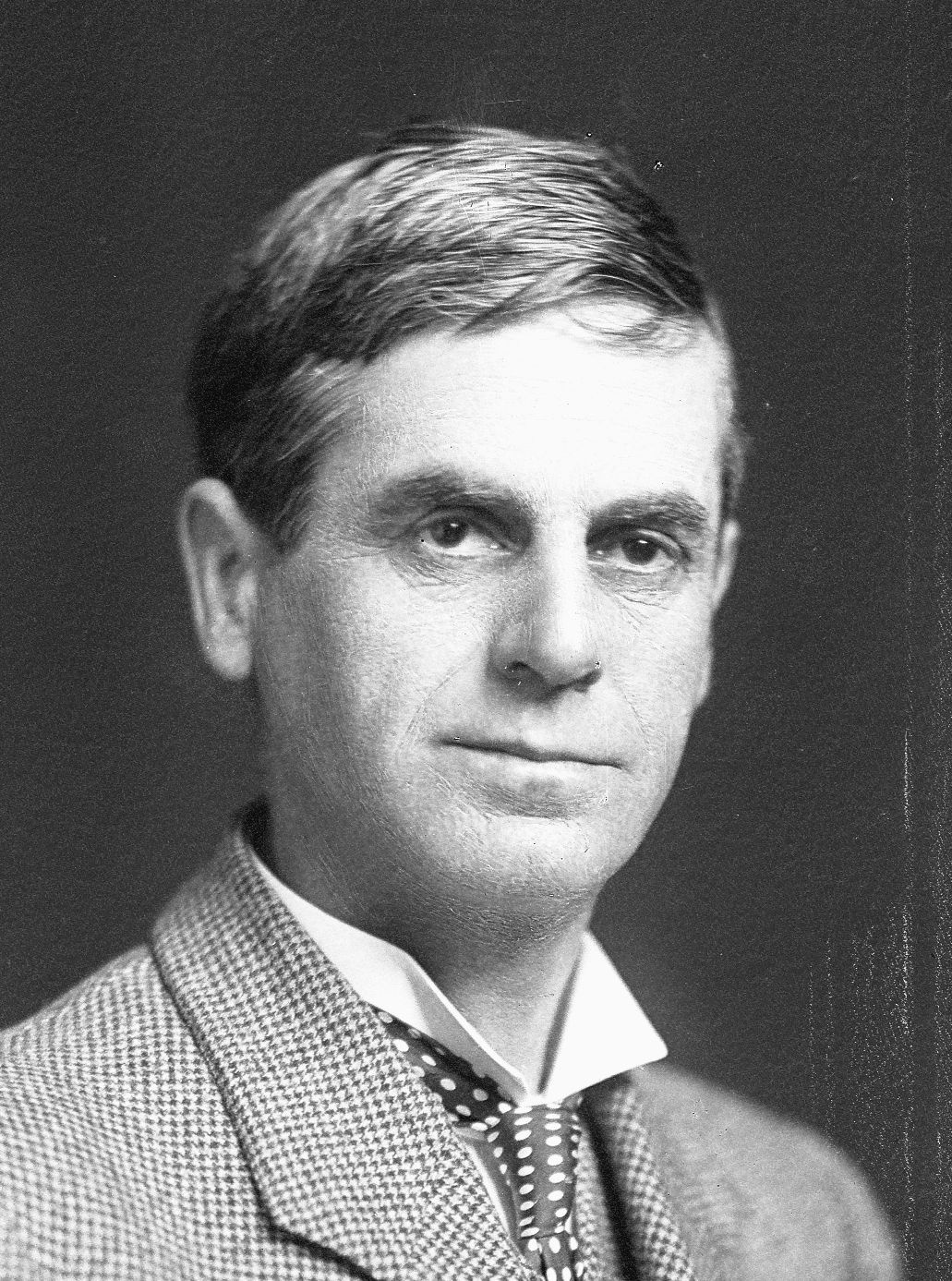

Candidate	Charles Lewis	Tommy Taylor	Richard Molesworth Taylor
Party	Conservative	Independent Liberal	Liberal
Popular vote	4,714	4,302	3,196
Percentage	38.60	35.23	26.17
Member before election
William Pember Reeves
Liberal
Elected Member
Charles Lewis
Conservative

The City of Christchurch by-election of 1896 was a by-election held on 13 February 1896 during the 12th New Zealand Parliament in the urban seat of the City of Christchurch. The by-election was triggered by the appointment of William Pember Reeves as Agent-General to the United Kingdom. The Liberal Government led by Richard Seddon had trouble finding a suitable candidate and delayed Reeves' resignation until the day he left his home in Christchurch to take up the London post. Nonetheless, rumours of Reeves' pending resignation had been circulating for a month and candidates were lining up. The Liberal Party candidate who was secured resigned within a week of Reeves' eventual resignation, and a new candidate had to be found. Three candidates contested the election: Richard Molesworth Taylor was the official Liberal Party candidate, Tommy Taylor was a prohibitionist also with liberal views but an ardent opponent of Seddon, and Charles Lewis was the reluctant conservative candidate of the opposition. Being a Liberal Party stronghold, vote splitting between those candidates who held liberal views secured the election win for Lewis, with the Liberal Party candidate coming last.

== Background ==
William Pember Reeves was a lawyer and prominent journalist in Christchurch. He was first elected to the House of Representatives in the 1887 election for the St Albans electorate, and transferred to the City of Christchurch electorate when it was recreated for the 1890 election. Reeves was a cabinet minister in the Liberal Government, but had an uneasy relationship with the premier, Richard Seddon, and was blocked by Seddon from implementing labour reforms. Reeves was offered the position of Agent-General, which he accepted; this was an influential position and when the post became that of a high commissioner ten years later, the salary exceeded that of the prime minister. But nonetheless, Seddon was determined to remove Reeves from his cabinet, and this was a convenient way of achieving this. Rumours about Reeves' pending change of career started to circulate in early December 1895, but the official announcement was left until 6 January 1896, with Reeves leaving Lyttelton for Wellington later that evening, and from Wellington for London only four days later. The Governor, The Earl of Glasgow, received Reeves' resignation from the Christchurch electorate when he reached Lyttelton on 13 January.

The local Christchurch newspaper, The Press, commented on Reeves' immediate departure after the official announcement in the following way:

For months after they had decided to appoint Mr. Reeves Agent-General, they kept the matter stringing on because they could not find a candidate to their liking to take his place. When at last they made up their minds, they had driven it so late that Mr. Reeves's departure savoured more of flight or an elopement than the dignified farewell of a Minister of the Crown going Home to represent the colony in London.

— The Press editorial

== Candidates ==
=== John Lee Scott ===
John Lee Scott (1848–1913) was a prominent engineer and businessman, and ran Scott Bros. with his brother George. He had been on the Sydenham Borough Council, and in 1887 he was a member of Christchurch City Council. Scott stood in the 1886 Sydenham by-election and came second to Richard Molesworth Taylor.

On the evening of 3 January, i.e. before the official announcement of Reeves' appointment had been made, he received a large deputation, and Scott informed them that he had already checked with his brother by telegram whether he would consent him leaving the business for parliamentary work. While the deputation was still with him, his brother's positive reply arrived and Scott thus consented to become a candidate. Scott was Seddon's preferred candidate for the Liberal Party, as he was also a prohibitionist and would thus draw votes from Tommy Taylor, whom Seddon tried to keep out of Parliament.

Scott withdrew from the election on 14 January, as it had transpired that his brother and business partner had to be overseas for much of the year, and he had thus to remain in Christchurch to look after their commercial interests. The conservative The Press commented:

But for Mr. Scott's retirement, the writ would have been issued yesterday. Now we suppose the Government will keep the matter dilly-dallying for an indefinite time while they fish round for another candidate. We say that this is treating the electors of Christchurch with scant consideration or respect.

— The Press editorial

The other Christchurch newspaper, The Star, itself a supporter of the Liberal Government, strongly disagreed with this stance and argued that it was only natural for the Liberal Party to find another candidate before issuing the writ.

=== Tommy Taylor ===
Tommy Taylor (1862–1911) was the first candidate to officially announce his candidacy by advertisement on 7 January. Taylor had started training as a Methodist minister but discontinued when he was found to be "too unorthodox and argumentative". As a prohibitionist, he had a national profile, and he had great popular appeal. The Alcoholic Liquors Sale Control Act, 1893 was seen as a cynical attempt by Richard Seddon's—himself a former publican—to appeal to the masses, and it turned Taylor into an opponent of Seddon. Taylor's political beliefs were otherwise in line with the Liberal Party.

=== Charles Lewis ===
Charles Lewis (1857–1927) announced his candidacy on 8 January by advertisement for the conservative opposition. Lewis was born in Christchurch and received his education in Christchurch and England. Upon his return, he was employed as a farmer until he inherited his father's farm in Halswell. He was a member of various local bodies, most importantly the Halswell Road Board. Lewis was asked to stand in rural Canterbury electorates in 1890 and 1893, but he refused; partially because of a weak constitution of his health. Lewis was on the committee of the National Association (i.e. the opposition) and was part of a small majority that decided that this by-election should be contested by conservative interests. Together with two others, he was tasked with finding a suitable candidate, and it was him who informed the print media that a conservative candidate would stand. No candidate being found, Lewis saved the situation by consenting to become the candidate himself. Lewis was practically unknown in the City of Christchurch electorate prior to the by-election.

As the Lyttelton Times reported, the conservatives were hoping that vote splitting would occur between the two candidates with liberal views, and although Christchurch was a liberal stronghold, this was their only chance of getting a conservative candidate elected.

=== Richard Molesworth Taylor ===
On the same day as Lewis (8 January), Richard Molesworth Taylor (1835–1919) confirmed his candidacy by advertisement in the interest of the Liberal Party, although he was not their official candidate. Taylor came to New Zealand as a child from England, and spent his late teens and early twenties at the Victorian and New South Wales gold rushes. He had a brief involvement in the New Zealand Wars, before becoming a contractor in Auckland and then in Christchurch. He was first elected to the House of Representatives in the 1886 Sydenham by-election and represented Sydenham until 1890, and the City of Christchurch electorate until his defeat at the 1893 election when he refused to align with Richard Seddon.

== Run up to the election ==
The governor received Reeves' resignation from his ministerial posts and his electorate upon his arrival in Lyttelton on 13 January, but the following day, Scott resigned from the campaign. On 16 January, the Seddon Ministry gazetted Reeves' resignation from his ministerial posts, but not his resignation from the City of Christchurch electorate. On 23 January, Liberal Party organisers met and confirmed Richard Molesworth Taylor as the official government candidate. The following day, Reeves' resignation was finally gazetted. The writ was issued on 31 January and the election advertised by the returning officer, John Whitelaw, on 3 February. The nomination date was set for 5 February, and the election date set for Thursday, 13 February. Polling was from 9am to 7pm, and 11 polling booths were provided throughout the central city, Waltham, Phillipstown, Richmond, Sydenham, Addington, Edgeware (then called Knightstown), and St Albans. Three ministers of the crown travelled from Wellington to Christchurch to support Richard Molesworth Taylor; The Press commented that this had never happened before.

== Results ==
The election proceeded in an orderly manner, unlike many other Christchurch elections at the time. The contest was an open one; any of the three candidates was regarded as being able to win. Lewis won the election, and Tommy Taylor came second. The Press commented that this was a "crushing defeat" for the government, as Lewis was a member of the opposition, and Tommy Taylor was one of the "most uncompromising opponents of the Premier".

1896 City of Christchurch by-election
Party	Candidate	Votes	%	±%
Conservative	Charles Lewis	4,714	38.60	
Independent Liberal	Tommy Taylor	4,302	35.23	
Liberal	Richard Molesworth Taylor	3,196	26.17	+7.49
Majority		412	3.37	+0.80
Informal votes		81	0.46	
Turnout		12,293	70.01	−4.62
Registered electors		17,559		

Lewis was confirmed by the voters in the 1896 and 1899 general elections, but he found the parliamentary work demanding to his health. At the time, sessions regularly extended into the evening or the early morning, sometimes even all night. He missed the last week of the session in 1900 due to exhaustion. When he called a meeting in Christchurch in June 1901 that was poorly attended—The Press argued that people were focussed on the upcoming royal visit instead—he felt unsupported by the constituency and resigned later that week. Subsequently, Lewis served two more terms (1902–1908) in the rural constituency of Courtenay.

Tommy Taylor stood in the City of Christchurch electorate at the December 1896 general election and out of 11 candidates, he came third in the three-member electorate, and began a colourful and successful political career. Taylor was extremely popular and elected Mayor of Christchurch in April 1911. When he suddenly died only three months later aged 49, 50,000 people lined the streets for his funeral procession; the largest funeral that the city has ever seen.

Richard Molesworth Taylor also stood in the City of Christchurch electorate at the 1896 general election later in the year. He came tenth, securing less than 4% of the votes. It was the last time that he stood for election.
