= Frank Lethbridge =

New Zealand politician (1852–1915)

New Zealand Parliament
Years	Term	Electorate	Party
1896–1899	13th	Rangitikei	Conservative
1899–1902	14th	Rangitikei	Conservative
1902–1905	15th	Oroua	Conservative
1905–1908	16th	Oroua	Conservative

Frank Yates Lethbridge (22 May 1852 – 26 January 1915) was an independent conservative Member of Parliament in New Zealand.

He represented the Rangitikei electorate from 1896 to 1902, and then the Oroua electorate from 1902 to 1908, when he retired.

New Zealand Parliament
Preceded by Jack Stevens	Member of Parliament for Rangitikei; 1896–1902	Succeeded by Arthur Remington
New constituency	Member of Parliament for Oroua; 1902–1908	Succeeded by David Guthrie
