= 1891 City of Christchurch by-election =

New Zealand by-election

1891 Christchurch by-election
- 9 October 1891
- Turnout: 6,921

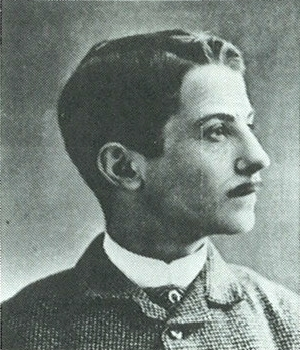
Candidate	Ebenezer Sandford	John Tippet Smith	Eden George
Party	Liberal–Labour	Liberal	Conservative
Popular vote	1,851	1,109	637
Percentage	51.45	30.83	17.70
Member before election
Westby Perceval
Liberal
Elected Member
Ebenezer Sandford
Liberal–Labour

The Christchurch by-election of 1891 was a by-election during the 11th New Zealand Parliament held on 9 October that year in the Christchurch electorate. It was triggered by the resignation of sitting member Westby Perceval who had been appointed as the new Agent-General in the United Kingdom.

The election would later come under protest by Eden George who claimed that nominations had been accepted too late to warrant candidacy.

== Results ==
The following table gives the election results:

1891 City of Christchurch by-election
Party	Candidate	Votes	%	±%
Liberal–Labour	Ebenezer Sandford	1,851	51.45	
Liberal	John Tippet Smith	1,109	30.83	
Conservative	Eden George	637	17.70	
Majority		742	20.62	
Turnout		3,597		
