= Tommy Taylor (New Zealand politician) =

New Zealand politician

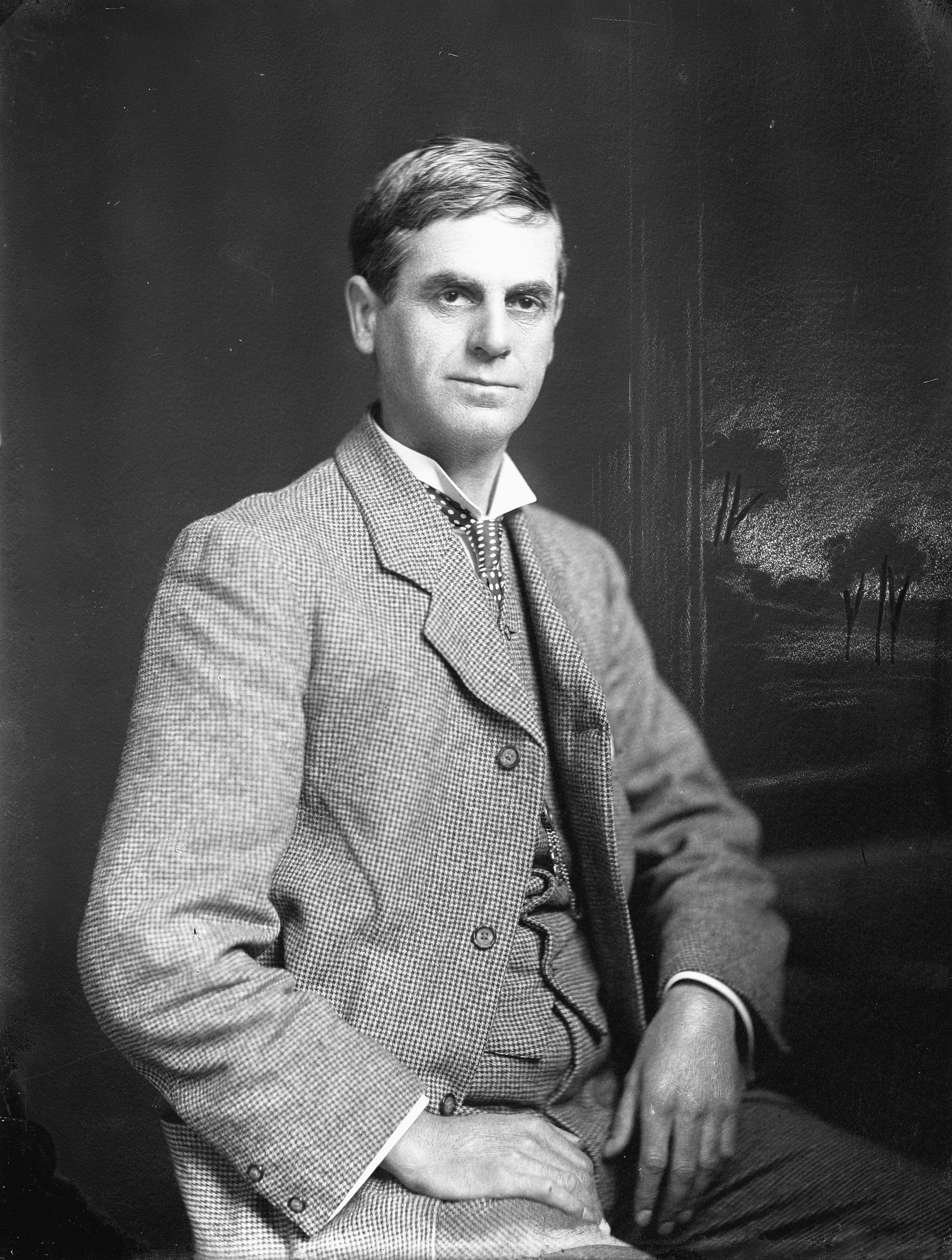
- Tommy Taylor (ca 1910)

Member of the New Zealand Parliament for City of Christchurch
- In office 1896–1899
- In office 1902–1905
- Succeeded by: electorate dissolved

Member of the New Zealand Parliament for Christchurch North
- In office 1908 – 27 July 1911
- Preceded by: Charles Gray
- Succeeded by: Leonard Isitt

29th Mayor of Christchurch
- In office 27 April 1911 – 27 July 1911
- Preceded by: Charles Allison
- Succeeded by: John Joseph Dougall

Personal details
- Born: 16 June 1862 Kirton in Lindsey, Lincolnshire, England
- Died: 27 July 1911 (aged 49) Christchurch
- Party: Independent; New Liberal Party
- Spouse: Elizabeth Best Ellison (m. 1892)
- Children: Five daughters and one son, including E.B.E. Taylor
- Occupation: Importer, estate agent

Thomas Edward Taylor (16 June 1862 – 27 July 1911) was a Christchurch mayor, New Zealand Member of Parliament, businessman and prohibitionist.

== Early life ==
Taylor was born on 16 June 1862 in Kirton in Lindsey, Lincolnshire, England, the son of Edward Taylor and his wife, Anne Turner. The Taylors emigrated to New Zealand in 1873, arriving at Lyttelton on the Cardigan Castle on 15 November. They settled in Addington. Taylor briefly continued his education at Christchurch West School but left in 1874 for employment.

For nearly 20 years, Taylor was employed by Heywood and Co (forwarding agents) and was their manager for several years. In February 1895, he became self-employed as a real estate agent and importer.

== Political life ==
=== Member of Parliament ===
New Zealand Parliament
Years	Term	Electorate	Party
1896–1899	13th	Christchurch	Independent
1902–1905	15th	Christchurch	Independent Liberal
1905	Changed allegiance to:		New Liberal
1908–1911	17th	Christchurch North	Liberal–Labour

Taylor stood in the City of Christchurch by-election on 13 February 1896 against Charles Lewis and Richard Molesworth Taylor. Lewis won with a majority of 402 votes, with Tommy Taylor coming second.

He contested the City of Christchurch electorate at the 1896 general election in December and this time was returned as a Member of Parliament. He held this seat until 1899 and from 1902 to 1905.

Taylor contested the Christchurch North electorate in the 1905 general election, but lost against Charles Gray. He contested this seat again and represented Christchurch North from 1908 to 27 July 1911. Taylor sat as an independent Liberal-Labour MP and received endorsement from the Labour movement. His death caused a by-election, which was won by Leonard Isitt.

=== Independent MP ===
Taylor was an independent MP. In 1905 he became the leader of the New Liberal Party. He opposed the Premier Richard Seddon of the Liberal Party over government corruption, and Seddon's support for the Licensed Trade (i.e., the Liquor Industry) and the Boer War in South Africa. Other Independent MPs associated with Taylor were George Laurenson, Leonard Isitt, Harry Bedford and Francis Fisher.

=== Mayor of Christchurch ===
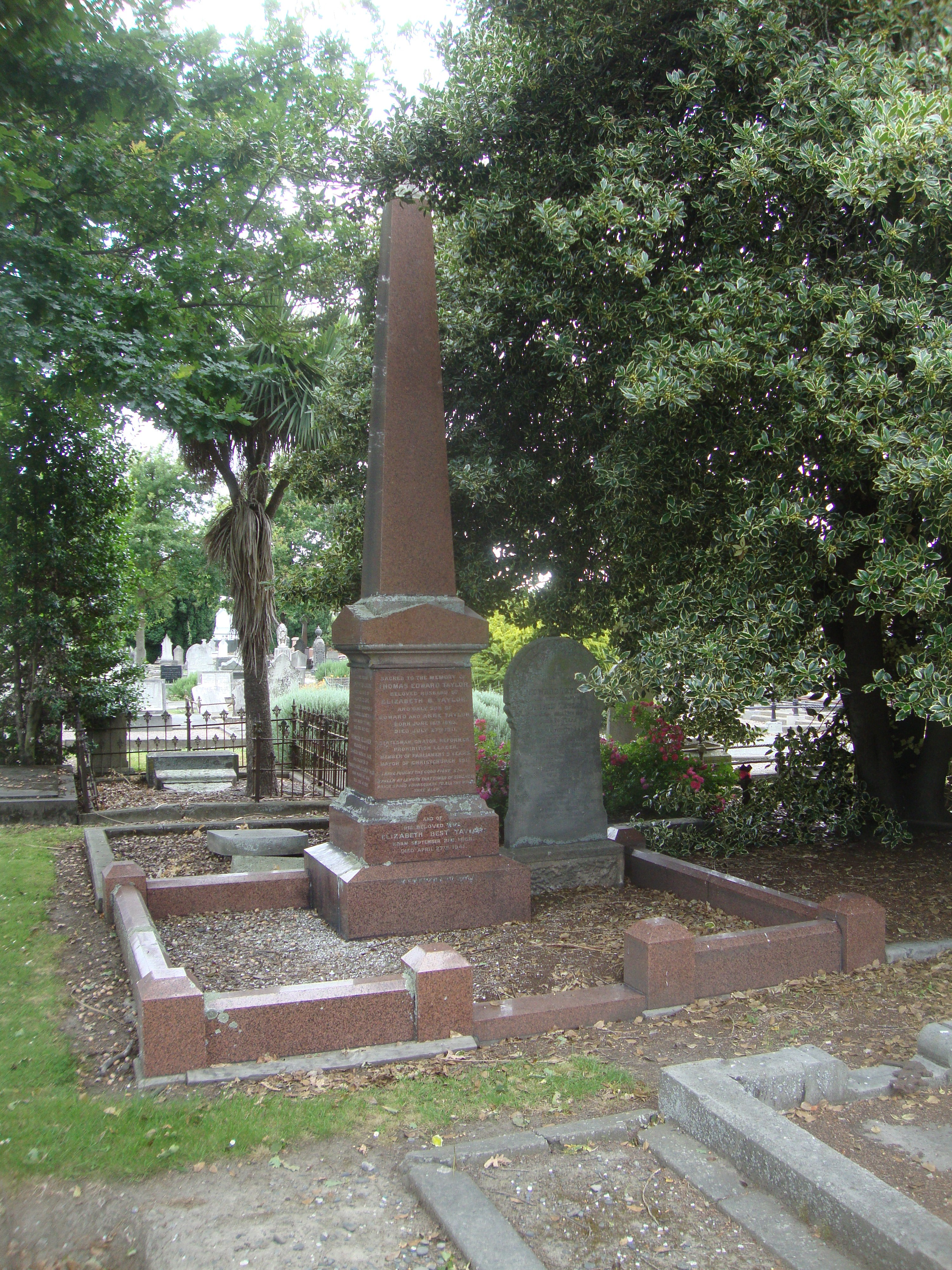
Tommy Taylor grave at Addington Cemetery

Taylor was an advocate of "Municipal Socialism" and was endorsed by the Labour Party in his campaign for the Christchurch mayoralty in 1911, but he never joined a labour organisation. On 27 April 1911, he was elected Mayor of Christchurch, defeating the incumbent, Charles Allison, and Henry Thacker. Taylor died shortly thereafter on 27 July 1911. His funeral was the largest ever known in Christchurch.

== Life outside politics ==
Taylor was a successful importer and estate agent in Christchurch. He married Elizabeth Best Ellison in 1892. They had five daughters, and one son, Edward Bickmore Ellison Taylor, who was a member of the Christchurch City Council between 1968 and 1971.

Taylor died of a perforated gastric ulcer at Christchurch on 27 July 1911. Such was the respect he commanded that 50,000 people lined the streets of the city for his funeral procession. James McCombs, Secretary of the Christchurch Prohibition League and later a Labour Party MP, paid tribute to his co-worker and friend:

He had a worldwide outlook. There was no country, no nation, no social movement that did not command his interest. He had a passion for freedom, and his whole career was inspired by the desire that men should have the fullest opportunity for untrammelled development.

His wife died in April 1941.

New Zealand Parliament
Preceded by George John Smith, Charles Lewis, William Whitehouse Collins	Member of Parliament for Christchurch; 1896–1899; 1902–1905; Served alongside: George John Smith and Charles Lewis (1896–1899), Harry Ell and Thomas Davey (1902–1905)	Succeeded by Harry Ell, Charles Lewis, William Whitehouse Collins
Preceded by Harry Ell, George John Smith, William Whitehouse Collins	Member of Parliament for Christchurch; 1896–1899; 1902–1905; Served alongside: George John Smith and Charles Lewis (1896–1899), Harry Ell and Thomas Davey (1902–1905)	Constituency abolished
Preceded by Charles Gray	Member of Parliament for Christchurch North; 1908–1911	Succeeded by Leonard Isitt
Political offices
Preceded by Charles Allison	Mayor of Christchurch; 1911	Succeeded by John Joseph Dougall
