= George John Smith =

New Zealand politician

The Honourable George John Smith CBE
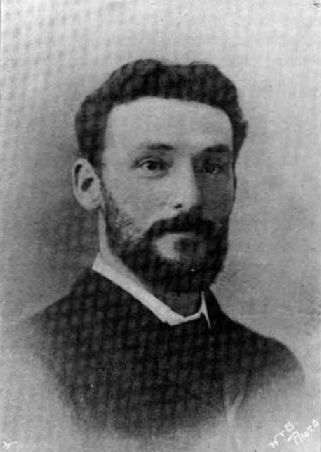
- George John Smith

Member of Parliament for City of Christchurch
- In office 1893–1899
- Preceded by: Ebenezer Sandford
- Succeeded by: Harry Ell
- In office 1901–1902
- Preceded by: Charles Lewis
- Succeeded by: Thomas Davey

Personal details
- Born: 1862 Consett
- Died: 1946 (aged 83–84)
- Party: Independent
- Spouse: married 1887 to the only daughter of the late Mr. R. Dawsson

Colonel George John Smith CBE (1862–1946) was a New Zealand Member of Parliament for the City of Christchurch electorate in the South Island, and later a member of the Legislative Council.

== Early life ==
Smith was born in Consett in County Durham and educated at the Wesleyan Church School in Newcastle upon Tyne. Following that, he worked at the office of the Government solicitors.

He came to New Zealand in 1879. He was a lawyer and businessman in Christchurch. He was a councillor on the Sydenham Borough Council. A strong prohibitionist, Smith was elected to the Sydenham Licensing Committee in 1891, which was determined to refuse all licences in the borough. Several members including Smith were removed from this position by order of the Supreme Court for "incurable bias".

== Member of Parliament ==
New Zealand Parliament
Years	Term	Electorate	Party
1893–1896	12th	Christchurch	Independent
1896–1899	13th	Christchurch	Independent
1901–1902	14th	Christchurch	Independent Liberal

Smith then stood for parliament. In the 1893 election, he came second in the three-member City of Christchurch electorate, and thus entered the House of Representatives. He was re-elected in 1896 (coming second in the electorate), but defeated in 1899. He was returned to parliament again at the 1901 City of Christchurch by-election triggered by the resignation of Charles Lewis. Smith was an independent MP for his entire parliamentary career.

He was appointed a Commander of the Order of the British Empire (CBE) in the 1918 New Year Honours.

== Legislative Council ==
Smith was appointed to the Legislative Council in 1907, and was a member from 1907 to 1914 and 1920 to 1932.

== Other activities ==
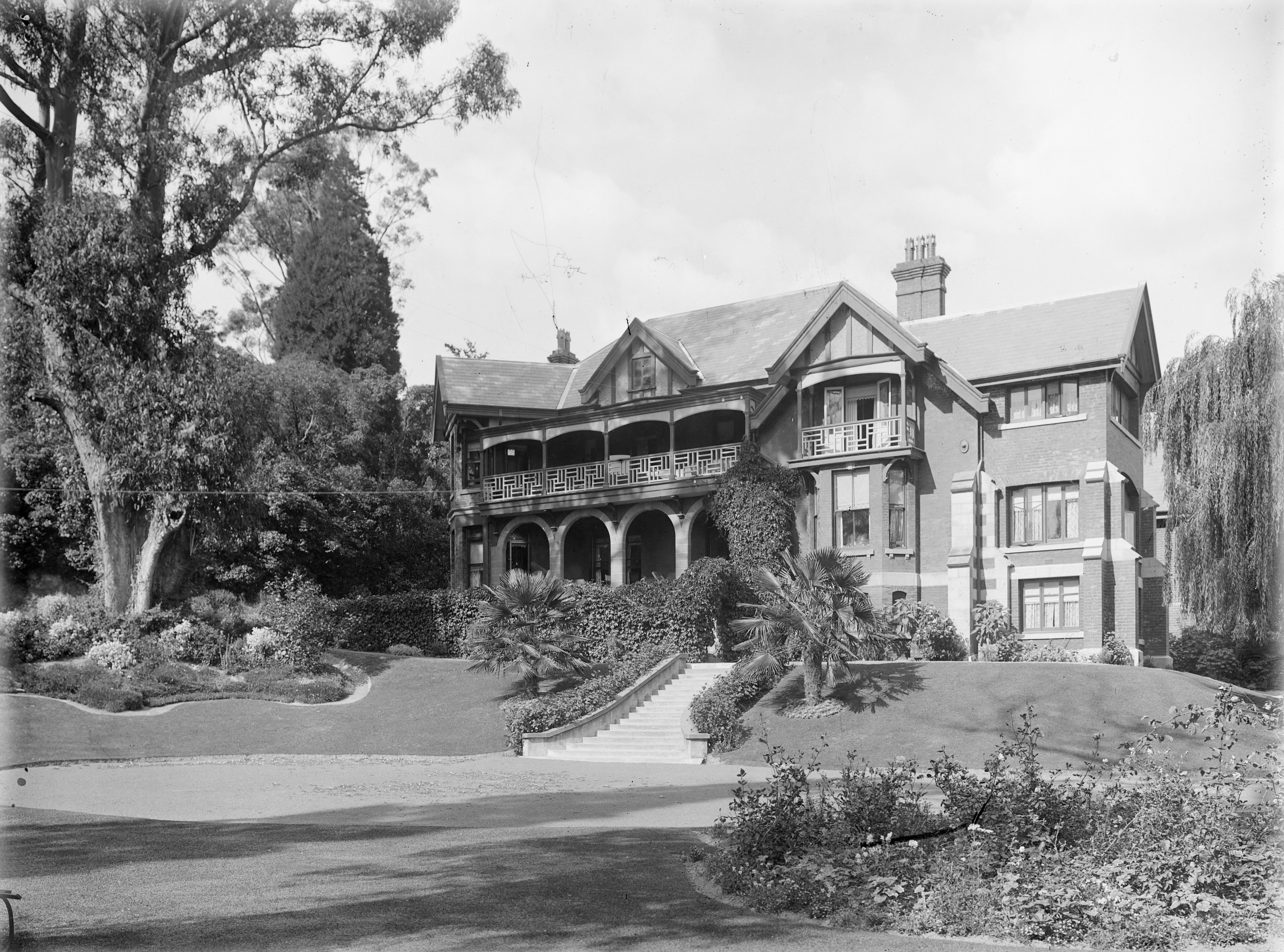
Riverlaw in Christchurch

Smith purchased Riverlaw from Hugh Murray-Aynsley in 1905, a substantial property and homestead on the Ōpāwaho / Heathcote River at the bottom of Rāpaki Track. He enlarged the house and added a third storey. After his death, Riverlaw was for many years used by the YWCA. On 6 September 1984, the house was registered with the New Zealand Historic Places Trust (since renamed to Heritage New Zealand) as a Category II heritage place, with registration number 3728; Riverlaw was regarded as one of the finest colonial homes in Christchurch. It was significantly damaged in the 2011 Christchurch earthquake and demolished soon after.

Smith was for many years a member of the Board of Governors of Canterbury College (1903–1907, 1913–1917, 1920–1946). He was Chairmen of the Board of Governors from 1928 to 1932.

In 1935, he was awarded the King George V Silver Jubilee Medal.

== Notes ==
New Zealand Parliament
Preceded by Ebenezer Sandford, William Pember Reeves, Richard Molesworth Taylor	Member of Parliament for Christchurch; 1893–1899; 1901–1902; Served alongside: William Pember Reeves (1893–1896), William Whitehouse Collins (1893–1896 and 1901–1902), Charles Lewis and Tommy Taylor (1896–1899), Harry Ell (1901–1902)	Succeeded by Harry Ell, Charles Lewis, William Whitehouse Collins
Preceded by Harry Ell, Charles Lewis, William Whitehouse Collins	Member of Parliament for Christchurch; 1893–1899; 1901–1902; Served alongside: William Pember Reeves (1893–1896), William Whitehouse Collins (1893–1896 and 1901–1902), Charles Lewis and Tommy Taylor (1896–1899), Harry Ell (1901–1902)	Succeeded by Harry Ell, Thomas Davey, Tommy Taylor
Academic offices
Preceded by Henry Acland	chairman of the board of Governors of Canterbury College; 1928–1932	Succeeded by Christopher Thomas Aschman
