= Christchurch (electorate) =

Christchurch was a parliamentary electorate in Christchurch, New Zealand. It existed three times. Originally it was the Town of Christchurch from 1853 to 1860. From the 1860–1861 election to the 1871 election, it existed as City of Christchurch. It then existed from the 1875–1876 election until the 1881 election. The last period was from the 1890 election to the 1905 election. Since the 1946 election, a similarly named electorate called Christchurch Central has been in existence.

The historic electorate was represented by 21 members of parliament. For some of the time, it was represented by one member at a time. During other periods, it was one of the few three-member electorates in New Zealand.

== Population centres ==
In December 1887, the House of Representatives voted to reduce its membership from general electorates from 91 to 70. The 1890 electoral redistribution used the same 1886 census data used for the 1887 electoral redistribution. In addition, three-member electorates were introduced in the four main centres. This resulted in a major restructuring of electorates, and Christchurch was one of eight electorates to be re-created for the 1890 election. The electorate included Christchurch City, Hagley Park, the boroughs of Sydenham and St Albans, and parts of the Linwood borough.

== History ==
=== 1853 to 1871 ===
The nomination meeting for the first election was held on 16 August 1853 at the Christchurch Land Office, together with the nomination meeting for the Christchurch Country electorate. The first election was held on Saturday, 20 August between 9 am and 4 pm at the Resident Magistrate's Office in Christchurch, with Charles Simeon acting as the returning officer.

At the nomination meeting on 31 January 1861, John Cracroft Wilson was proposed by William Wilson and seconded by William Thomson. Cracroft Wilson was declared elected unopposed. In the 1866 election, James FitzGerald was unopposed.

From 1853 to 1871, the electorate was represented by one member at a time. Prior to the 1860/61 election, it was known as Town of Christchurch:

Election	Winner
1853 election	Henry Sewell
1855 election	Henry Sewell
1856 by-election	Richard Packer
1860 by-election	Henry Sewell
1861 election	John Cracroft Wilson
1866 election	James FitzGerald
1867 by-election	William Travers
1870 by-election	William Sefton Moorhouse

=== 1875 to 1881 ===
The electorate was recreated for the 1875 election and existed for two terms until the 1881 election as a three-member electorate.

The nomination meeting for the 1875 election was held on 16 December. The former member of the Legislative Council, Leslie Lee, was the returning officer. Edward Richardson, who had previously represented Christchurch West, was nominated by Louis Edward Nathan and seconded by Edward Bishop. Edward Cephas John Stevens, who had previously represented Selwyn, was nominated John Inglis and seconded by William Derisley Wood. Samuel Paull Andrews was nominated by Henry Wynn-Williams and seconded by Daniel Reese. William Sefton Moorhouse was nominated by Fred Hobbs and seconded by William Wilson. Jerningham Wakefield put his own name forward, and he was seconded by James Treadwell. The latter was in turn proposed by J. R. Johnson and seconded by J. S. Buxton. The election was held on 21 December, and Stevens, Richardson, and Moorhouse were returned with 1059, 992, and 662 votes, respectively. Andrews, Wakefield, and Treadwell received 532, 241, and 22 votes, respectively. Historian George Macdonald said of Treadwell that "he was not taken seriously and there was no reason why he should be".

George Grey was elected in both the Thames and the City of Christchurch electorates in September 1879. Grey came first in the three-member Christchurch electorate (Samuel Paull Andrews and Edward Stevens came second with equal numbers of votes, and only 23 votes ahead of Edward Richardson). Richardson petitioned against Grey's return on technical grounds, as Grey had already been elected in the Thames electorate. The electoral commission unseated Grey on 24 October, with Richardson offered to fill this vacancy a few days later. Grey kept the Thames seat and remained a member of parliament through that constituency.

Election	Winners		
1875 election	William Sefton Moorhouse	Edward Richardson	Edward Cephas John Stevens
1879 election	Samuel Paull Andrews	Edward Richardson	Edward Cephas John Stevens

=== 1890 to 1905 ===
From 1890 until the 1905 election, it was a three-member electorate again. Six candidates stood for election in 1890: William Pember Reeves (2784 votes), Westby Perceval (2721 votes), Richard Molesworth Taylor (2614 votes), John Tippett Smith (1811 votes), Edward Wingfield Humphreys (1666 votes) and Eden George (119 votes). Reeves, Perceval and Taylor were thus elected.

The 1896 by-election was caused by the appointment of William Pember Reeves as Agent-General.

Key:

Liberal Conservative Independent Liberal Liberal–Labour Independent

Election	Winners		
1890 election	Westby Perceval	William Pember Reeves	Richard Molesworth Taylor
1891 by-election	Ebenezer Sandford	William Pember Reeves	Richard Molesworth Taylor
1893 election	George John Smith	William Pember Reeves	William Whitehouse Collins
1896 by-election	George John Smith	Charles Lewis	William Whitehouse Collins
1896 election	George John Smith	Charles Lewis	Tommy Taylor
1899 election	Harry Ell	Charles Lewis	William Whitehouse Collins (2nd period)
1901 by-election	Harry Ell	George John Smith (2nd period)	William Whitehouse Collins (2nd period)
1902 election	Harry Ell	Thomas Henry Davey	Tommy Taylor (2nd period)
(Electorate abolished 1905)

== Election results ==
=== 1901 by-election ===
1901 City of Christchurch by-election
Party	Candidate	Votes	%	±%
Independent Liberal	George John Smith	3,912	40.3%	
Liberal–Labour	Charles Taylor	3,418	35.2%	
Independent Liberal	Arthur Hughes Turnbull	2,377	24.5%	
Majority				
Informal votes		—	—	
Turnout		9,707	55.9%	
Registered electors		17,355		

=== 1899 election ===
1899 general election: Christchurch
Party	Candidate	Votes	%	±%
Liberal	William Whitehouse Collins	7,688	53.56	+16.13
Conservative	Charles Lewis	6,346	44.21	−2.11
Independent Liberal	Harry Ell	6,149	42.84	+9.67
Independent	Tommy Taylor	5,928	41.30	+2.91
Independent	George John Smith	5,413	37.71	−4.17
Liberal–Labour	Charles Taylor	5,212	36.31	
Conservative	Michael Donnelly	4,427	30.84	+4.69
Conservative	James Greig	1,899	13.23	
Majority		221 (Note: Majority is difference between lowest winning poll (Ell – 6,149) and highest losing poll (Taylor – 5,928))	1.54	+1.22
Turnout		14,354	69.18	−9.65
Registered electors		20,750		

Table footnotes:

=== 1896 election ===
1896 general election: Christchurch
Party	Candidate	Votes	%	±%
Conservative	Charles Lewis	6,570	46.32	+7.72
Independent	George John Smith	5,940	41.88	+0.52
Independent	Tommy Taylor	5,445	38.39	+3.16
Liberal	William Whitehouse Collins	5,309	37.43	+1.90
Independent	Harry Ell	4,705	33.17	
Conservative	Harry Beswick	3,874	27.31	
Conservative	Michael Donnelly	3,709	26.15	
Liberal	William Cullen	3,365	23.72	
Liberal	James Marciel	2,982	21.02	
Liberal	Richard Molesworth Taylor	555	3.91	−22.26
Independent	James Timothy Partridge	97	0.68	
Majority		136 (Note: Majority is difference between lowest winning poll (Taylor – 5,445) and highest losing poll (Collins – 5,309))	0.32	
Informal votes		350	2.41	
Registered electors		18,439		
Turnout		14,534	78.82	

Table footnotes:

=== 1896 by-election ===
1896 City of Christchurch by-election
Party	Candidate	Votes	%	±%
Conservative	Charles Lewis	4,714	38.60	
Independent Liberal	Tommy Taylor	4,302	35.23	
Liberal	Richard Molesworth Taylor	3,196	26.17	+7.49
Majority		412	3.37	+0.80
Informal votes		81	0.46	
Turnout		12,293	70.01	−4.62
Registered electors		17,559		

=== 1893 election ===
1893 general election: Christchurch
Party	Candidate	Votes	%	±%
Liberal	William Pember Reeves	5,442	49.90	
Independent	George John Smith	4,510	41.36	
Liberal	William Whitehouse Collins	3,875	35.53	
Liberal–Labour	Ebenezer Sandford	3,594	32.96	−18.49
Liberal	James O'Bryen Richard Dott Hoare	3,098	28.41	
Liberal	Charles Henry Bradbury	2,937	26.93	
Liberal	Richard Molesworth Taylor	2,037	18.68	
Liberal	William Hoban	1,976	18.12	
Conservative	Mortimer Davie	1,846	16.93	
Conservative	Joseph Evison	1,753	16.08	
Conservative	Eden George	1,647	15.10	−2.60
Majority		281	2.58	−18.04
Turnout		10,905	74.63	
Registered electors		14,612		

=== 1891 by-election ===
1891 City of Christchurch by-election
Party	Candidate	Votes	%	±%
Liberal–Labour	Ebenezer Sandford	1,851	51.45	
Liberal	John Tippet Smith	1,109	30.83	
Conservative	Eden George	637	17.70	
Majority		742	20.62	
Turnout		3,597		

=== 1879 election ===
1879 general election, Christchurch
Party	Candidate	Votes	%	±%
Independent	Sir George Grey^{b}	1,315	70.58	
Independent	Samuel Paull Andrews	1,250	67.09	
Independent	Edward Cephas John Stevens	1,250	67.09	
Independent	Edward Richardson	1,227	65.86	
Independent	James Treadwell	548	29.41	
Majority		22	1.1	
Turnout		1,863		

^{b} Grey was unseated after a petition as he had already been elected in the Thames electorate, with Richardson filling the vacancy.

=== 1875 election ===
1875 general election: Christchurch
Party	Candidate	Votes	%	±%
Independent	Edward Cephas John Stevens	1,059	91.61	
Independent	Edward Richardson	992	85.81	
Independent	William Sefton Moorhouse	622	53.81	
Independent	Samuel Paull Andrews	532	46.02	
Independent	Jerningham Wakefield	241	20.85	
Independent	James Treadwell	22	1.90	
Majority		90	7.79	
Turnout		1156	48.92	
Registered electors		2,363		

=== 1867 by-election ===
1867 City of Christchurch by-election
Party	Candidate	Votes	%	±%
Independent	William Travers	384	56.14	
Independent	Henry Tancred	300	43.86	
Turnout		684		
Majority		84	12.28	

=== 1860 by-election ===
1860 Town of Christchurch by-election
Party	Candidate	Votes	%	±%
Independent	Henry Sewell	77	70.0	
Independent	Michael Hart	33	30.0	
Majority		44	40.0	
Turnout		110	68.8	

=== 1853 election ===
1853 general election: Town of Christchurch
Party	Candidate	Votes	%	±%
Independent	Henry Sewell	61	64.21	
Independent	Charles B. Fooks	34	35.79	
Majority		27	28.42	
Turnout		95	73.64	
Registered electors		129		
