= Country quota =

Part of the New Zealand electoral system from 1881 until 1945

The country quota was a part of the New Zealand electoral system from 1881 until 1945, when it was abolished by the First Labour Government. Its effect was to make urban (Note: Urban electorates were those that contained cities or boroughs of over 2000 people or were within 5 miles (8.0 km) of the chief post offices in Auckland, Wellington, Christchurch, or Dunedin.) electorates more populous than rural ones, thus making rural votes worth more in general elections.

== Background ==
The quota was established to prevent, or at least slow, the marginalisation of rural interests as the New Zealand population became increasingly urbanised. There was a strong rural focus in New Zealand culture at the time. The device was also justified for ostensible practical reasons, such as that it was more difficult to cast a vote in isolated rural areas, making it easier for city people to exercise political influence. The quota was also a way to counteract the influence of recently enfranchised working men; until 1879 only (male) property owners could vote, which meant that a disproportionate number of electors lived in the countryside. The quota was originally 33%, meaning that urban electorates were 33% larger than rural electorates and, essentially, rural votes were worth 33% more. In 1887 the quota was reduced to 18%, but then increased two years later to 28%.

== Opposition ==
The country quota was always unpopular with the Labour Party, which took most of its support from the cities, and generally felt the system to be an undemocratic violation of the 'one man one vote' principle. Its policy of abolishing the quota was abandoned in the 1930s in order to win rural support, and the extra seats remained for the first three terms of the First Labour Government. By the 1940s Labour had lost most of its rural support and felt that the quota could cost it the 1946 election. Consequently, the quota was abolished in 1945 after Labour had put the abolition bill (Clause 3 of the Electoral Amendment Act, 1945) up in a surprise move, and Labour won the election by four seats.

Labour Party President and Member of the Legislative Council Tom Paul had stated his disapproval of the electoral process in an address during the 1914 election:

The theory on which our electoral law is based is that each man and each woman shall have equal voice in the councils of our nation on polling day. It matters not whether one represents property worth a hundred thousand pounds or the other typifies poverty of the most extreme degree, the voice of each is equal. But the theory is not perfectly applied. For instance, the vote of the rural voter is worth 28 per cent more than that of a city voter—an anomaly which ought not to exist in a democracy.

== Analysis ==
In 1969, political scientist and historian Robert Chapman studied the effect of the country quota in the five elections 1919 to 1931, when there were eight extra seats (76 not 68 European seats) because of the quota. He found the quota had only a small effect on Labour, which was down two seats in 1931 and one seat in 1919, 1922, 1925 and 1928. Only in 1922 could this have affected the results of the election, as Reform Prime Minister Massey would have had to find three, not two, allies from the Liberals. But Massey easily found two Liberals (who were afterwards nominated to the Legislative Council), and with the disarray in the Liberals could have found one more.

This surprising result had three reasons:

- Reform and Liberal had urban support, and would have got some of the extra urban seats.
- Labour had three country-mining seats, and may have lost one or more of these.
- The fictitious eight country seats would have been redistributed, and as the countryside was still half of all New Zealand it would have received four back again.

== See also ==
- New Zealand Parliament
- Malapportionment

== Footnotes ==
Explanatory note

Citations
