= 1870 Parnell by-election =

New Zealand by-election

The 1870 Parnell by-election was a by-election held on 12 May 1870 in the Parnell electorate during the 4th New Zealand Parliament.

The by-election was caused by the resignation of the incumbent MP Charles Heaphy on 13 April 1870.

The by-election was won by Reader Wood, who had held the seat from 1861 to 1865. As no other candidates were nominated, he was declared duly elected.
