= Mary Dreaver =

New Zealand politician

The Honourable Mary Dreaver MBE
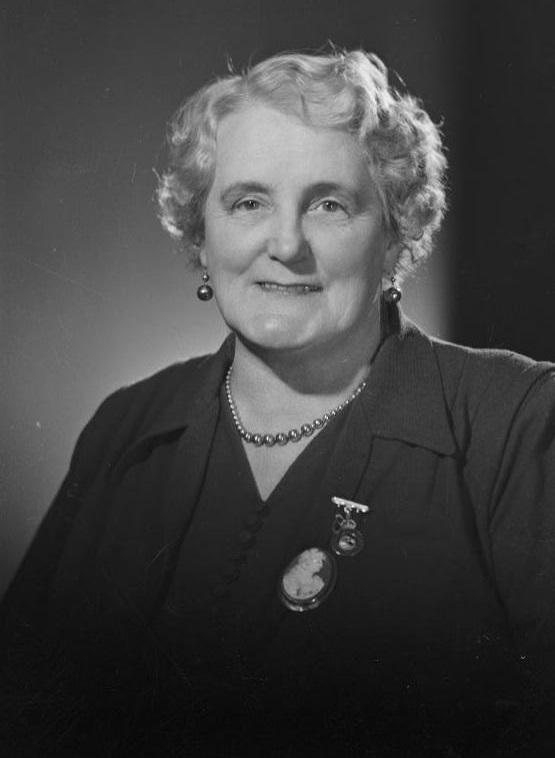

Member of the New Zealand Parliament for Waitemata
- In office 19 July 1941 – 25 September 1943
- Preceded by: Jack Lyon
- Succeeded by: Henry Thorne Morton

New Zealand Legislative Councillor
- In office 31 January 1946 – 31 December 1950
- Appointed by: Peter Fraser

Personal details
- Born: Mary Manson Bain; 31 March 1887 Dunedin, New Zealand
- Died: 19 July 1961 (aged 74) Auckland, New Zealand
- Party: Labour
- Spouse: Andrew James Dreaver (m. 1911)
- Children: 6
- Profession: Journalist

Mary Manson Dreaver MBE (née Bain, 31 March 1887 – 19 July 1961) was a New Zealand politician of the Labour Party. She was the third woman to sit in the New Zealand House of Representatives, one of the first two women to sit in the New Zealand Legislative Council, and the only woman to sit in both chambers.

== Early life and family ==
Mary Dreaver was born in Dunedin in 1887, the oldest of 13 children of Alexander Manson Bain, a Scottish Presbyterian cabinetmaker and trade unionist, and his Irish Catholic wife Hanna Kiely. The children were raised Anglican.

She married Andrew James Dreaver, a salesman and former boxer, in 1911 and moved to Auckland. The couple had six children. One son, Alex, was an Auckland city councillor from 1953 to 1974.

Mary Dreaver taught piano and became active in the National Spiritualist Church of New Zealand, in which she was ordained as the church's first woman minister in New Zealand in 1934. She was also a journalist. She wrote an astrology column in the New Zealand Woman's Weekly and was a broadcaster on Radio 1ZB as Aunt Maisy. She was also known as a painter of watercolour landscapes under the name May Bain.

== Political career ==
=== Local politics ===
Dreaver was active in the New Zealand Labour Party from at least the 1920s, and also joined the Women's International and Political League and the National Council of Women of New Zealand. As a Labour candidate she unsuccessfully contested the Newmarket Borough Council in 1927 and the Auckland Hospital Board in 1929. She won a seat on the Auckland Hospital Board in 1931. In 1933 a visit by her to the hospital kitchen and claims of long hours and "sweated labour" there aroused controversy on the board. Dreaver continued as a member of the hospital board until 1944 and was elected for another period from 1950 to 1956.

She was also a member of the Auckland Transport Board from 1939 to 1944, the Auckland Electric Power Board from 1944 to 1947, and the Auckland Metropolitan Drainage Board between 1956 and 1957. She was a member of the Auckland City Council (its second woman member after Ellen Melville) from 1938 to 1944 and again from 1953 to 1961.

=== Member of Parliament ===
Dreaver made five attempts to enter parliament. She first sought selection by the Labour Party for the 1930 by-election in the Parnell electorate, but was beaten by Tom Bloodworth. She next sought the Labour nomination for the 1936 by-election in the Manukau seat, but was beaten by Arthur Osborne. She won selection to contest Remuera for Labour in the 1938 election, coming second to Bill Endean. Auckland West MP and prime minister Michael Joseph Savage died in 1940; Dreaver stood for the Labour nomination for the Auckland West by-election, but lost to Peter Carr.

New Zealand Parliament
Years	Term	Electorate	Party
1941–1943	26th	Waitemata	Labour

In 1941 she won the Waitemata electorate when a by-election was held after the death of the previous Labour Party MP, Jack Lyon. She was the third woman to be elected to Parliament after Elizabeth McCombs and Catherine Stewart and the first woman from Auckland. During her time in Parliament, Dreaver introduced the Women Jurors Bill, which enabled women to optionally submit their names as prospective jurors. The bill became law in 1942.

Dreaver was defeated in the next (1943) general election, by the National Party candidate, Henry Thorne Morton. After her defeat she contributed to the war effort as a recruiter for the Women's Land Army.

=== Member of the Legislative Council ===
Dreaver and Mary Anderson were the first two women appointed to the Legislative Council. They were appointed by the First Labour Government in 1946 (after a law change in 1941 to make women eligible); they served to 1950 when the Legislative Council was abolished.

== Honours and awards ==
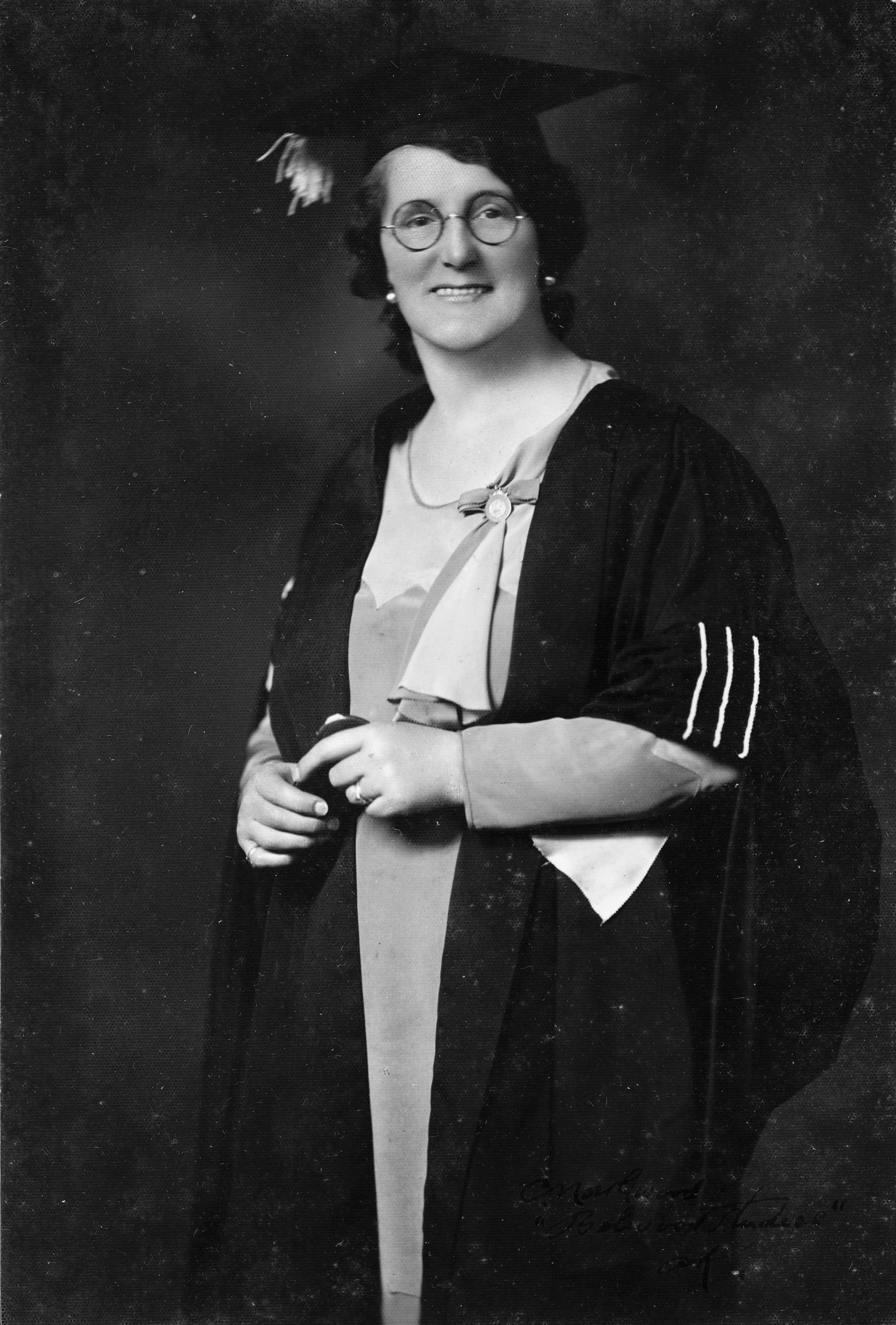
Dreaver in 1934

In the 1946 New Year Honours, Dreaver was appointed a Member of the Order of the British Empire for services in connection with recruiting for the Women's Land Army.

== Death ==
Mary Dreaver died in Auckland on 19 July 1961. She was survived by her husband (by only three months), three daughters and two sons.

== Notes ==
New Zealand Parliament
Preceded by Jack Lyon	Member of Parliament for Waitemata; 1941–1943	Succeeded by Henry Thorne Morton
