= Reader Wood =

New Zealand politician (1821–1895)

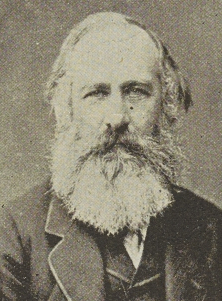
- Wood in his later years

7th Colonial Treasurer
- In office 12 July 1861 – 6 August 1862
- Prime Minister: William Fox
- In office 21 August 1862 – 24 November 1864
- Prime Minister: Alfred Domett; Frederick Whitaker

1st Minister for Colonial Defence
- In office 22 July 1862 – 30 October 1863
- Prime Minister: Alfred Domett

Member of the New Zealand Parliament for Parnell
- In office 1861–1865
- In office 1870–1878

Member of the New Zealand Parliament for Waitemata
- In office 1879–1881

Personal details
- Born: Reader Gillson Wood; 1821 Highfields, Leicester, England
- Died: 20 August 1895 (aged 73–74) Parnell, New Zealand
- Resting place: St Stephen's Cemetery, Parnell
- Spouse: Mary Jane Holland
- Children: One son
- Occupation: Architect, land surveyor, politician

Reader Gillson Wood (1821 – 20 August 1895) was a 19th-century New Zealand politician. An architect by trade, he designed the 1854 General Assembly House built as New Zealand's first meeting house for the House of Representatives.

== Early life ==
Wood, the son of Thomas and Sarah Wood, was baptised at the Church of St Mary de Castro, Leicester, Leicestershire, England, on 5 January 1821. He was educated at the Merchant Taylors' School, London. He was brought up as an architect, and shortly after his articles had expired left England for New Zealand, arriving in Auckland in 1844.

== Life in Auckland ==
The Battle of Kororāreka happened in the Bay of Islands in March 1845 and there were fears that the fighting would spread to Auckland, which at the time was the capital of New Zealand. Wood was made lieutenant of Volunteer Artillery, and was present at the attempted storming of Hōne Heke's pā at Ohaeawai on 1 July 1845. He was mentioned in Colonel Henry Despard's despatch describing that affair. After the war Wood returned to Auckland, where he practised his profession of architect and surveyor. About 1848 he was employed by the Government as Inspector of Roads, afterwards he was appointed Deputy Surveyor-General, which office he retained until 1856. He was tasked with the design of the General Assembly House, which was built in 1854 in Auckland as New Zealand's first meeting house for the House of Representatives.

== Political career ==
New Zealand Parliament
Years	Term	Electorate	Party
1861–1865	3rd	Parnell	Independent
1870	4th	Parnell	Independent
1871–1875	5th	Parnell	Independent
1875–1878	6th	Parnell	Independent
1879–1881	7th	Waitemata	Independent

Wood was elected to the Auckland Provincial Council in the Suburbs of Auckland electorate on 7 October 1857. He served for the duration of the third council until the end of the term on 12 September 1861.

Wood was the Member of Parliament for Parnell from January 1861 to 1865 (resigned), then 1870 to 1878 (resigned); then for Waitemata from 1879 to 1881, when he retired. He also had a second term on the provincial council, where he represented the Parnell electorate on the seventh council from 29 November 1873 until the abolition of the provincial government system on 31 October 1876. From May to October 1875, he was part of the Auckland Executive Council (equivalent to a cabinet).

In the House of Representatives, he was a cabinet minister, including the positions of Minister of Finance (then called Colonial Treasurer) twice, and Minister of Defence (then called Minister of Colonial Defence). He was part of the Auckland wing of the Liberal Party, sometimes called the "Auckland Rats".

He stood in the 1887 election in the Waitemata electorate and was defeated by Richard Monk.

== Later life ==
Wood later became chairman of the Auckland Gas Company following his retirement from politics.

== Private life and death ==
On 20 May 1850, he married Mary Jane Holland at St Paul's Church, Auckland's oldest Anglican church. He died at his home in Parnell, Auckland, on 20 August 1895, leaving his widow and one son, and was buried at St Stephen's Cemetery, Parnell.

== Notes ==
Government offices
Preceded by William Richmond	Colonial Treasurer; 1861–1862; 1862–1864	Succeeded by Dillon Bell
Preceded by Dillon Bell	Colonial Treasurer; 1861–1862; 1862–1864	Succeeded by William Fitzherbert
New office	Minister for Colonial Defence; 1862–1863	Succeeded by Harry Atkinson
New Zealand Parliament
New constituency	Member of Parliament for Parnell; 1861–1865; 1870–1878	Succeeded by Robert Creighton
Preceded by Charles Heaphy	Member of Parliament for Parnell; 1861–1865; 1870–1878	Succeeded by Frederick Moss
Preceded by John Macfarlane	Member of Parliament for Waitemata; 1879–1981	Succeeded by William Hurst
