= Waitemata (electorate) =

Waitemata was a New Zealand parliamentary electorate, from 1871 to 1946, and then from 1954 to 1978. It was represented by 18 members of parliament.

== Population centres ==
The Waitemata electorate was created in the 1870 electoral redistribution based on 1867 New Zealand census data and was used in its initial form for the 1871 election. It was located north of the various urban Auckland electorates and south of the Rodney electorate. The following settlements were included in its initial area: Cornwallis, Huia, Parau, Laingholm, Titirangi, Waiatarua, Oratia, Piha, Henderson Valley, Swanson, Rānui, Waitākere township, Taupaki, Kumeū, Hobsonville, Whenuapai, Takapuna, and Helensville.

The First Labour Government was defeated in the 1949 election and the incoming National Government changed the Electoral Act, with the electoral quota once again based on total population as opposed to qualified electors, and the tolerance was increased to 7.5% of the electoral quota. There was no adjustments in the number of electorates between the South and North Islands, but the law changes resulted in boundary adjustments to almost every electorate through the 1952 electoral redistribution; only five electorates were unaltered. Five electorates were reconstituted (including Waitemata) and one was newly created, and a corresponding six electorates were abolished; all of these in the North Island. These changes took effect with the 1954 election.

== History ==
The electorate existed from 1871 to 1946, and from 1954 to 1978.

Early members were Thomas Henderson 1871–1874 (resigned), Gustav von der Heyde 1874–1875 (unseated on petition), John Sangster Macfarlane 1876–1879 (defeated), Reader Wood 1879–1881 (retired), William John Hurst 1881–1886 (died), Richard Monk 1886–1890 (defeated), and Jackson Palmer 1890–1893 (defeated).

The election of Richard Monk, who stood again in 1893, was declared invalid. From 1894 to 1896 Waitemata was held by future Prime Minister William Massey, until he transferred to Franklin. Richard Monk held the electorate for the period 1896–1902. The seat was then held by Ewen Alison from 1902 to 1908, Leonard Phillips from 1908 to 1911, and Alexander Harris from 1911 to 1935.

In 1946 Henry Thorne Morton, who had held the seat from 1943, was defeated for North Shore.

=== Members of Parliament ===
Waitemata was represented by 18 Members of Parliament.

Key

Independent Independent Liberal Conservative Reform Labour National

Election	Winner
1871 election	Thomas Henderson
1st 1874 by-election	Gustav von der Heyde
2nd 1874 by-election	Gustav von der Heyde
1876 election	John Macfarlane
1879 election	Reader Wood
1881 election	William Hurst
1884 election	William Hurst
1886 by-election	Richard Monk
1887 election	Richard Monk
1890 election	Jackson Palmer
1893 election	Richard Monk
1894 by-election	William Massey
1896 election	Richard Monk
1899 election	Richard Monk
1902 election	Ewen Alison
1905 election	Ewen Alison
1908 election	Leonard Phillips
1911 election	Alexander Harris
1914 election	Alexander Harris
1919 election	Alexander Harris
1922 election	Alexander Harris
1925 election	Alexander Harris
1928 election	Alexander Harris
1931 election	Alexander Harris
1935 election	Jack Lyon
1938 election	Jack Lyon
1941 by-election	Mary Dreaver
1943 election	Henry Morton
(electorate abolished 1946–1954, see North Shore)
1954 election	Norman King
1957 election	Norman King
1960 election	Norman King
1963 election	Norman King
1966 election	Norman King
1969 election	Frank Gill
1972 election	Michael Bassett
1975 election	Dail Jones
(electorate abolished 1978, see Helensville)

== Election results ==
=== 1975 election ===
1975 general election: Waitemata
Party	Candidate	Votes	%	±%
National	Dail Jones	8,965	46.94	
Labour	Michael Bassett	7,580	36.69	−17.21
Social Credit	Gordon McCormick	1,460	7.64	−0.38
Values	Steve Covacich	1,046	5.47	
Independent	Gordon Bree	44	0.23	
Majority		1,385	7.25	
Turnout		19,095	77.75	−10.91
Registered electors		24,557		

=== 1972 election ===
1972 general election: Waitemata
Party	Candidate	Votes	%	±%
Labour	Michael Bassett	8,083	53.90	+10.91
National	Ray La Varis	5,539	36.93	
Social Credit	Gordon McCormick	1,203	8.02	
New Democratic	John Robert Neil	106	0.70	
Liberal Reform	Robert John Hannaford	65	0.43	
Majority		2,544	16.96	
Turnout		14,996	88.66	−1.72
Registered electors		16,913		

=== 1969 election ===
1969 general election: Waitemata
Party	Candidate	Votes	%	±%
National	Frank Gill	8,804	48.82	
Labour	Michael Bassett	7,752	42.99	
Social Credit	Alex Davidson	1,475	8.18	
Majority		1,052	5.83	
Turnout		18,031	90.38	+4.08
Registered electors		19,950		

=== 1966 election ===
1966 general election: Waitemata
Party	Candidate	Votes	%	±%
Labour	Norman King	11,624	53.09	−2.03
National	Terry Power	7,792	35.59	
Social Credit	Joseph F. Richards	2,476	11.31	
Majority		3,832	17.50	−0.89
Turnout		21,892	86.30	−2.24
Registered electors		25,365		

=== 1963 election ===
1963 general election: Waitemata
Party	Candidate	Votes	%	±%
Labour	Norman King	9,686	55.12	+5.30
National	Butch Pugh	6,767	38.51	
Social Credit	Byrt Jordan	954	5.42	−0.91
Communist	Basil James Holmes	164	0.93	
Majority		2,919	16.61	−9.88
Turnout		17,571	88.54	−2.60
Registered electors		19,845		

=== 1960 election ===
1960 general election: Waitemata
Party	Candidate	Votes	%	±%
Labour	Norman King	9,241	49.82	−3.70
National	Jolyon Firth	7,992	43.09	
Social Credit	Byrt Jordan	1,174	6.33	+0.01
Communist	Hugh John McLeod	139	0.74	
Majority		1,249	6.73	−6.64
Turnout		18,546	91.14	−3.69
Registered electors		20,348		

=== 1957 election ===
1957 general election: Waitemata
Party	Candidate	Votes	%	±%
Labour	Norman King	8,771	53.52	+6.99
National	Robert Muldoon	6,580	40.15	
Social Credit	Byrt Jordan	1,036	6.32	−3.09
Majority		2,191	13.37	+10.89
Turnout		16,387	94.83	+3.20
Registered electors		17,280		

=== 1954 election ===
1954 general election: Waitemata
Party	Candidate	Votes	%	±%
Labour	Norman King	7,234	46.53	
National	Hubert Morrison	6,847	44.04	
Social Credit	Byrt Jordan	1,463	9.41	
Majority		387	2.48	
Turnout		15,544	91.63	
Registered electors		16,963		

=== 1943 election ===
1943 general election: Waitemata
Party	Candidate	Votes	%	±%
National	Henry Morton	6,451	42.22	
Labour	Mary Dreaver	6,130	40.12	−4.76
Democratic Labour	Karl Benjamin Ansley	976	6.38	
Independent	William C. Hewitt	204	1.33	
Informal votes		127	0.83	+0.10
Majority		321	2.10	
Turnout		15,277	94.62	
Registered electors		16,144		

=== 1941 by-election ===
1941 Waitemata by-election
Party	Candidate	Votes	%	±%
Labour	Mary Dreaver	4,396	44.88	
Independent National	William Brockway Darlow	3,884	39.65	
Democratic Labour	Norman Douglas	940	9.59	
Independent	Peter Robertson Gardner	414	4.22	
Independent	Henry Thomas Head	88	0.89	
Informal votes		72	0.73	−0.14
Majority		512	5.22	
Turnout		9,794	70.31	−23.88

=== 1938 election ===
1938 general election: Waitemata
Party	Candidate	Votes	%	±%
Labour	Jack Lyon	7,806	57.95	+6.43
National	John Ernest Close	5,545	41.16	
Informal votes		118	0.87	−0.84
Majority		2,261	16.78	−4.24
Turnout		13,469	94.19	+2.31
Registered electors		14,299		

=== 1935 election ===
1935 general election: Waitemata
Party	Candidate	Votes	%	±%
Labour	Jack Lyon	6,578	51.52	
Independent	Alexander Harris	3,894	30.50	−22.38
Democrat	Alan Walter Donald	2,045	16.02	
United	John Guiniven	252	1.97	
Informal votes		222	1.71	+1.37
Majority		2,684	21.02	−1.46
Turnout		12,991	91.88	+10.91
Registered electors		14,139		

=== 1931 election ===
1931 general election: Waitemata
Party	Candidate	Votes	%	±%
Independent	Alexander Harris	5,593	52.88	+12.28
Labour	Arthur Osborne	3,215	30.40	+8.85
United	William Brockway Darlow	1,769	16.72	
Informal votes		36	0.34	−0.28
Majority		2,378	22.48	+19.75
Turnout		10,613	80.97	−4.87
Registered electors		13,107		

=== 1928 election ===
1928 general election: Waitemata
Party	Candidate	Votes	%	±%
Independent	Alexander Harris	4,683	40.59	−17.24
United	Reginald Henry Greville	4,368	37.86	
Labour	Arthur Osborne	2,485	21.54	−7.16
Informal votes		72	0.62	+0.11
Majority		315	2.73	−26.40
Turnout		11,608	85.84	−4.84
Registered electors		13,523		

=== 1925 election ===
1925 general election: Waitemata
Party	Candidate	Votes	%	±%
Reform	Alexander Harris	7,101	57.84	+11.74
Labour	Arthur Osborne	3,524	28.70	
Liberal	Thomas Lamont	1,653	13.46	
Informal votes		63	0.51	−0.30
Majority		3,577	29.13	+16.36
Turnout		12,341	90.68	+1.00
Registered electors		13,610		

=== 1922 election ===
1922 general election: Waitemata
Party	Candidate	Votes	%	±%
Reform	Alexander Harris	4,586	46.10	−12.34
Liberal	Frank Henry Burbush	3,315	33.32	
Labour	Bob Way	2,047	20.58	
Informal votes		81	0.81	−0.59
Majority		1,271	12.78	−4.11
Turnout		10,029	89.67	+6.21
Registered electors		11,184		

=== 1919 election ===
1919 general election: Waitemata
Party	Candidate	Votes	%	±%
Reform	Alexander Harris	4,911	58.44	+2.65
Liberal	Arthur Edwin Greenslade	3,492	41.56	
Informal votes		119	1.40	+0.32
Majority		1,419	16.89	+5.31
Turnout		8,522	83.46	−1.22
Registered electors		10,211		

=== 1914 election ===
1914 general election: Waitemata
Party	Candidate	Votes	%	±%
Reform	Alexander Harris	4,881	55.79	+2.98
Liberal	Henry Cromwell Tewsley	3,868	44.21	
Informal votes		95	1.07	+0.91
Majority		1,013	11.58	+5.96
Turnout		8,844	84.68	+2.37
Registered electors		10,444		

=== 1911 election ===
1911 general election: Waitemata, first ballot
Party	Candidate	Votes	%	±%
Liberal	William Joseph Napier	3,064	42.40	+0.01
Reform	Alexander Harris	2,787	38.57	
Independent	Ewen Alison	1,375	19.03	
Informal votes		142	1.93	
Majority		277	3.83	−11.34
Turnout		7,368	83.64	+6.66
Registered electors		8,809		

1911 general election: Waitemata, second ballot
Party	Candidate	Votes	%	±%
Reform	Alexander Harris	3,823	52.81	+14.24
Liberal	William Joseph Napier	3,416	47.19	4.79
Informal votes		12	0.17	−1.76
Majority		407	5.62	+1.79
Turnout		7,251	82.31	−1.33
Registered electors		8,809		

=== 1908 election ===
1908 general election: Waitemata, first ballot
Party	Candidate	Votes	%	±%
Conservative	Leonard Phillips	2,946	49.50	
Liberal	William Joseph Napier	2,059	34.59	
Liberal	Henry Wakeford Wilding	673	11.31	
Independent	Theophilus Wake	274	4.60	
Majority		887	14.90	−3.47
Turnout		5,952	77.02	−8.03
Registered electors		7,728		

1908 general election: Waitemata, second ballot
Party	Candidate	Votes	%	±%
Conservative	Leonard Phillips	3,426	57.56	+8.06
Liberal	William Joseph Napier	2,523	42.39	+7.80
Majority		903	15.17	+0.27
Turnout		5,949	76.98	−0.04
Registered electors		7,728		

=== 1905 election ===
1905 general election: Waitemata
Party	Candidate	Votes	%	±%
Conservative	Ewen Alison	3,128	59.19	+0.49
Liberal	Cecil Clinkard	2,157	40.81	
Informal votes		84	1.56	
Majority		971	18.37	+0.98
Turnout		5,369	85.05	+14.02
Registered electors		6,313		

=== 1902 election ===
1902 general election: Waitemata
Party	Candidate	Votes	%	±%
Independent	Ewen Alison	2,409	58.70	
Liberal	Alexander John Hatfield	1,695	41.30	
Majority		714	17.40	+3.92
Turnout		4,104	71.03	+2.53
Registered electors		5,778		

=== 1899 election ===
1899 general election: Waitemata
Party	Candidate	Votes	%	±%
Conservative	Richard Monk	1,713	51.29	
Liberal	Edwin Ford	1,263	37.81	
Liberal	Charles Newman	364	10.90	
Majority		450	13.47	
Turnout		3,340	68.50	
Registered electors		4,876		

=== 1894 by-election ===
1894 Waitemata by-election
Party	Candidate	Votes	%	±%
Conservative	William Massey	1,619	52.82	
Independent Liberal	Jackson Palmer	1,446	47.17	
Majority		173	5.64	
Turnout		3,065		

=== 1890 election ===
1890 general election: Waitemata
Party	Candidate	Votes	%	±%
Independent Liberal	Jackson Palmer	752	53.22	
Conservative	Richard Monk	661	46.77	
Majority		91	6.44	
Turnout		1,413	39.92	
Registered electors		3,539		

=== 1886 Waitemata by-election ===
1886 Waitemata by-election
Party	Candidate	Votes	%	±%
Independent	Richard Monk	736	69.83	
Independent	Harry Farnall	312	29.60	
Majority		424	40.23	
Informal votes		6		
Turnout		1054		

=== September 1874 Waitemata by-election ===
September 1874 Waitemata by-election
Party	Candidate	Votes	%	±%
Independent	Gustav von der Heyde	271	56.46	
Independent	John Sangster Macfarlane	209	43.53	
Majority		62	12.92	
Turnout		480		

=== July 1874 Waitemata by-election ===
July 1874 Waitemata by-election
Party	Candidate	Votes	%	±%
Independent	Gustav von der Heyde	287	54.77	
Independent	John Sangster Macfarlane	237	45.23	
Majority		50	9.54	
Turnout		524		
