= 1867 Parnell by-election =

New Zealand by-election

The 1867 Parnell by-election was a by-election held on 5 June 1867 during the 4th New Zealand Parliament in the Auckland electorate of Parnell.

The by-election was caused by the resignation of the incumbent MP Frederick Whitaker.

The by-election was won by Charles Heaphy. Major Heaphy (VC) was unopposed, and hence was then declared elected.
