= Leonard Phillips =

New Zealand politician (1870–1947)

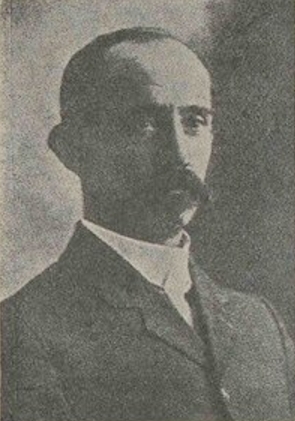
Photograph of Leonard Phillips

New Zealand Parliament
Years	Term	Electorate	Party
1908–1909	17th	Waitemata	Independent
1909–1911	Changed allegiance to:		Reform

Leonard Richard Phillipps (1870–1947) was a Reform Party Member of Parliament in New Zealand.

He was elected to the Waitemata electorate in the 1908 general election, but retired in 1911.

New Zealand Parliament
Preceded by Ewen Alison	Member of Parliament for Waitemata; 1908–1911	Succeeded by Alexander Harris
