= Ewen William Alison =

New Zealand politician

The Honourable Ewen William Alison
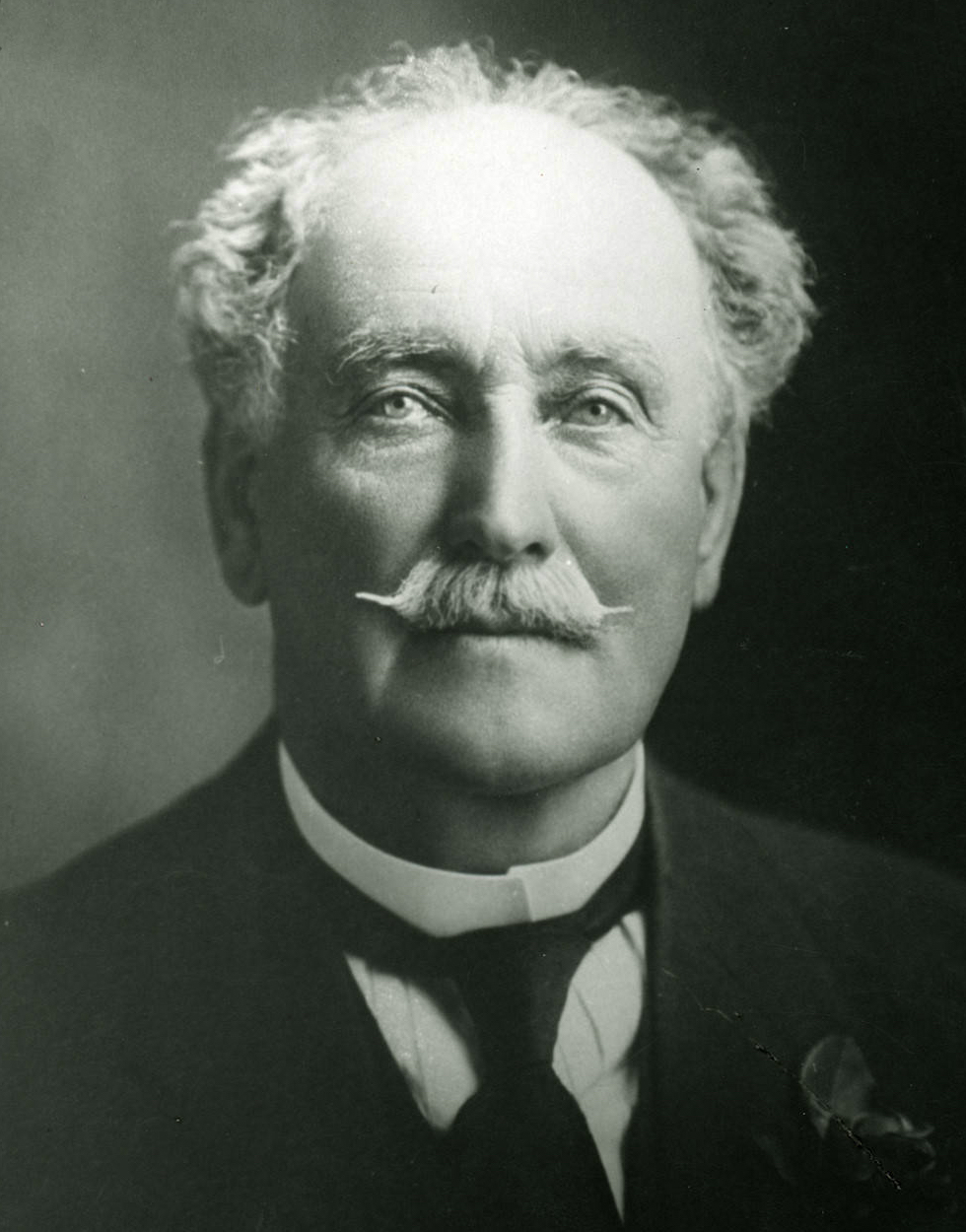
- Alison in 1913

2nd Mayor of Devonport
- In office 1890–1895
- Preceded by: Malcolm Niccol
- Succeeded by: Malcolm Niccol
- In office 1902–1907
- Preceded by: Malcolm Niccol
- Succeeded by: William Handley

1st Mayor of Takapuna
- In office September 1913 – May 1914
- Succeeded by: William Blomfield

Member of the New Zealand Parliament for Waitemata
- In office 25 November 1902 – 17 November 1908
- Preceded by: Richard Monk
- Succeeded by: Leonard Phillips

Member of the Legislative Council
- In office 7 May 1918 – 6 May 1925
- In office 7 May 1925 – 6 May 1932

Personal details
- Born: 29 February 1852 Auckland, New Zealand
- Died: 6 June 1945 (aged 93) Takapuna, Auckland
- Party: Reform (from 1909)
- Spouse: Mary Ann Coleman
- Relations: Jean Barlett (granddaughter); Alexander Alison (father)
- Children: 6
- Occupation: Politician, businessman
- Nickname: The Honorable E. W.

Ewen William Alison (29 February 1852 – 6 June 1945) was a businessman and politician from late 1800's New Zealand. He involved the inception and development of the North Shore and is locally referred to as the Father of both Devonport and Takapuna. He participated in local and national politics, serving as Mayor for both Takapuna and Devonport, on several boards and sat in both the House of Representatives (1902–1908) and the Legislative Council (1918–1932) of New Zealand. He was also the co-founder and chairperson of the Devonport Ferry Company with his brother Alexander Jr.

== Early life ==
Ewen William Alison was born in Auckland, New Zealand, on 29 February 1852 to Scottish settlers Jane Cameron and Alexander Alison. His father was a shipwright. and moved his family from Auckland to Devonport in 1854 as it became the next locum of shipbuilding in New Zealand, and subsequently Alexander became Devonport's first major shipbuilder. Alison continued to live on the North Shore for most of the rest of his life.

He was educated at St Mary's School, Devonport. At 13, he finished school and became employed as a type compositor at the New Zealand Herald, but in 1867, he departed Auckland to be a part of the Coromandel Gold Rush, where he earned a small amount of money.

== Business career ==
The money he earned from the gold rush was enough to kickstart a career in butchering with his brother Alexander Jr. They purchased a store in Devonport and sold their products on horse and cart throughout the area, raised livestock and purchased bones that they used to grind down into fertiliser. This lasted for 14 years.

=== Devonport Steam Company ===
In 1881, Alison and Alexander Jr. founded the Devonport Steam Ferry Company, providing steam ferries and buses for the Devonport area. He and his brother also bought sections of crown land and subdivided them into residential-sized properties which they would then on-sell. This was common practice at the time for influential members of the community and encouraged people to settle in the Devonport area but continue to work in the city.

The company faced many challenges through its early years, beating off competition from George Quick and his steam ferries Eagle and Osprey in 1887 and 1888, as well as the depressed economic conditions of the late 1880's and early 1890's. But by the 1910's the Devonport Steam Ferry Company controlled all major harbour crossings on the Waitematā. They faced one final competition in 1910 with the Takapuna Tramways and Ferry Company, which sailed from the newly made Bayswater wharf, but the company failed in 1927 and was absorbed by Devonport Steam Ferry Company. The Alison's took the absence of the Takapuna trams as an opportunity to found the North Shore Transport Company that year. They expanded bus services across the North Shore and became the main land transport service in the North Shore as well.

The Devonport Ferry Company produced several innovations in the ferry transport industry. They were the first to introduce what would become the standard for Auckland ferries – two-decked and double-ended, with wooden screws. They also introduced the first vehicular ferry, which could transport horses and carts across the harbour.

Alison was also involved in many other business ventures. He was involved in all of the aspects of providing coal for his steam-powered ferries, including shipping on the Kaipara Harbour, and the coal mining itself. He was chairman for the Northern Coal Company as well as the founder and chair for 44 years of Taupiri Coal Mines Ltd. He was the director for Waikato Carbonisation Ltd and president of the New Zealand Coal Mine Owner's Association. He also chaired several Auckland goldmining companies.

As an employer, Alison was anti-union. From 1902, he served on the Auckland Conciliation Board, which worked with local employers and unions to avoid conflicts being taken to the Arbitration Court. He expressed concerns towards the Trades and Labour Councils, and very much opposed the new wave of 'Red' Federation of Labour movement pre-WWI. He encouraged the Auckland branch of the Employers' Federation to create a nationwide defense fund that could be used in the event of union unrest or a general strike. This became policy in 1912. He supported his fellow employers in defeating the Auckland general labourer's union in their dispute against Auckland City Council in 1912 and in defeating the water-siders' union in 1913, further insisting that any water-siders or seafarers involved in the strike be blacklisted. His anti-union stance was reaffirmed in the aftermath of the Ralph Mine disaster where a massive explosion occurred at Ralph Mine in Huntly on 12 September 1914, large enough to cover the town centre in dust. In total, 43 men died, either in the explosion or as a result of it. Allegations of poor management and lack of safety concerns at the mine, which was owned by Alison's company Taupiri Coalmines Company, resulted in the Mining Amendment Bill of 1914 to improve conditions for miners and mine ventilation. Unionists complained that had better conditions been present the disaster would not have occurred.

== Political career ==
New Zealand Parliament
Years	Term	Electorate	Party
1902–1905	15th	Waitemata	Independent
1905–1908	16th	Waitemata	Conservative

Alison was an incredibly active member of local politics. His first political position was as a Councillor of the Waitemata County Council representing Takapuna Riding in 1876 at 24 years of age for five years. He went on to represent the Riding twice more from 1884 to 1887 and 1899 to 1902. He also was elected as a member of the Devonport Road Board in May 1884 until its dissolution in June 1886. From his early days as a politician he was a confidante of opposition leader William Massey.

He was then elected onto the newly formed Devonport Borough Council and served for two years. In 1890, he was elected as Mayor of Devonport and served from 1890 to 1895 and then was elected again in 1902 to 1907. In the interim between these two terms he continued to serve on the Borough Council as a Councillor. While Alison served on the Devonport Borough Council, he was also part of the Auckland Harbour Board from 1891, serving four terms. His terms from 1891 to 1913 he served on behalf of ship-owners and due payers. From 1913 to 1929, he served on the Board as a government appointee. He was an ally of Massey in the 1913 Great Strike to have the government's points of dispute settled. He was opposed to any deals with unions affiliated to the United Federation of Labour. His opposition also influenced the position of the Citizens' Defence Committee, but was too hardline and made negotiations for Massey difficult. The severity of the strike in Auckland was blamed on Alison with other metropolitan mayors recommending to Massey he handle such matters without Alison's involvement.

In 1906, Alison moved from Devonport to Takapuna, into his residence called Lochaber, and when Takapuna became a borough on 1 July 1913, he was elected its first mayor six weeks later on 15 August 1913. He served for one year.

Alison also participated in national politics. He served as a Member of the House of Representatives (now referred to as an MP) representing the Waitemata area from 1902 to 1908. He campaigned on a self-reliant platform, standing as an independent where he was described as being "...a servile follower of no party." Alison was described as having "opposition leanings" with his sole opponent for the seat being a supporter of the governing Liberal Party. He duly won the Auckland electorate of Waitemata in the 1902 general election, and held it to 1908, when he retired. In 1905 Alison had been associated with the breakaway New Liberal Party led initially by Harry Bedford and Francis Fisher, but had left the group well before the election in December. By August 1905 he had begun attending the conservative opposition's caucus meetings, stating at the time he was not confirming he was standing as an opposition candidate just that he was an out-and-out opponent of the Liberal Party government. By the time he opened his re-election campaign in November, he declared he was now standing emphatically in opposition to the Government.

Alison contested the Waitemata electorate in the 1911 election, but was eliminated in the first ballot. After his term as Mayor of Takapuna, he went on to serve as a Member of the Legislative Council in 1918 to 1932, again representing the Waitemata, this time as part of the Reform Party. He was reappointed in 1925 and served until the expiry of his second term in 1932. He was a member of the Reform Party's dominion executive.

== Personal life ==
Alison was described as "outgoing, personable and always ready with an opinion.' He married Mary Ann Coleman at St Andrews Anglican Church in Epsom on 26 July 1876. He had two daughters and four sons with her.

=== Lochaber ===
In 1906, Alison and his family moved from Melrose House in Devonport to Lochaber in Takapuna, where he lived until his death. Lochaber was located at the seaward side of The Promenade and Hurstmere Road and was 8 acres in size. The house had been built in the colonial style, and was surrounded by flowerbeds, a rose garden, a shrubbery and a croquet lawn. The property also contained a stone dairy, a coach house and stables as well as an orchard and a vegetable garden. Four acres of the property adjoined the Takapuna reef and ferry wharf. This area was first used for the house cow and racing horses, but was later turned into a picnic ground called Alison's Paddock. This picnic ground was transferred to his company, the Devonport Ferry Company in 1913, and was referred to as the Ferry Company Paddock from then on. After his death, Alison's residence became part of the Lochaber Motel. The building was removed from the property entirely in 1983.

=== Horse racing and sports ===
Alison was a passionate horse racer. He was the president of the Takapuna Jockey Club in 1885, even when the race course moved to Ellerslie in 1934. He was president until the club merged with Auckland Racing Club. He also represented Auckland on the New Zealand Racing Conference for 25 years. He imported and bred many racing horses. Alison Park in Narrowneck, where Takapuna Jockey Club's racetrack used to be, was named after him.

He was involved in several other sports in the North Shore area, having founded the Waitematā Golf Club and the Takapuna Bowling Club in 1911. He was also a founding member of the North Shore Rowing Club.

=== Death ===
Alison died on 6 June 1945 at 31 Kitchener Road at 93 years of age. He was interred at O'Neill's Point Cemetery in Bayswater, New Zealand. He continues to be remembered on the North Shore through a clock tower erected in his honour at the Devonport Wharf and the streets Alison Avenue in Takapuna and Ewen Alison Avenue in Devonport.

== Notes ==
New Zealand Parliament
Preceded by Richard Monk	Member of Parliament for Waitemata; 1902–1908	Succeeded by Leonard Phillips
