= 1886 Waitemata by-election =

New Zealand by-election

The 1886 Waitemata by-election was a by-election held on 11 December 1886 in the Waitemata electorate during the 9th New Zealand Parliament.

The by-election was caused by the death of the incumbent MP William John Hurst on 29 September 1886.

The by-election was won by Richard Monk who beat Harry Farnall. Farnall was ridiculed by one report, saying that Monk deserves to be called a "working man" not Farnall.

== Results ==
The following table gives the election result.

1886 Waitemata by-election
Party	Candidate	Votes	%	±%
Independent	Richard Monk	736	69.83	
Independent	Harry Farnall	312	29.60	
Majority		424	40.23	
Informal votes		6		
Turnout		1054		
