= 1894 Waitemata by-election =

New Zealand by-election

← 1893 general	9 April 1894	1896 general →
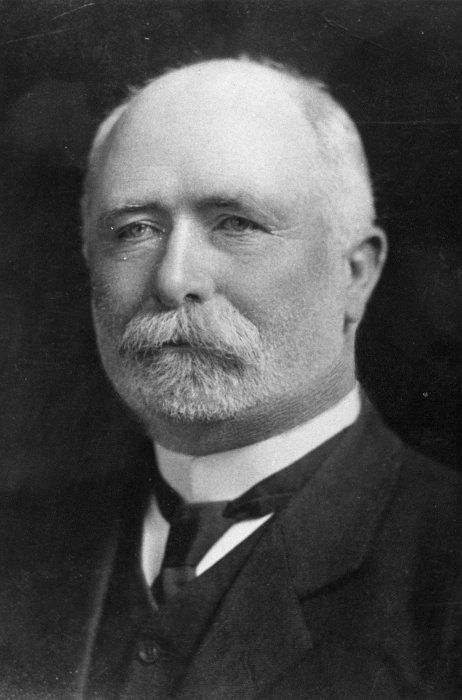

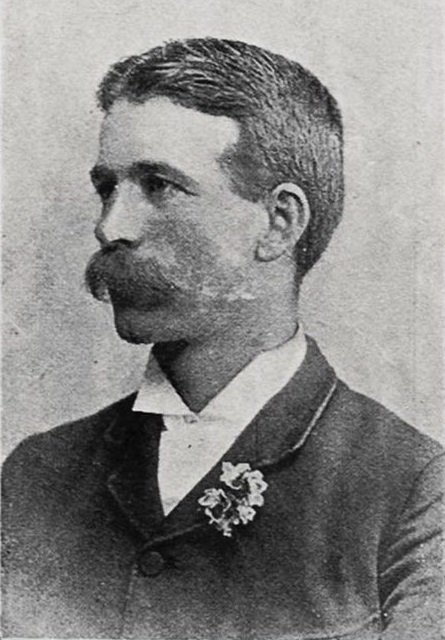
Candidate	William Massey	Jackson Palmer
Party	Conservative	Independent Liberal
Popular vote	1,619	1,446
Percentage	52.82	47.17
Member before election
Richard Monk
Conservative
Elected Member
William Massey
Conservative

The 1894 Waitemata by-election was a by-election held on 9 April 1894 during the 12th New Zealand Parliament in the rural North Island seat of the Waitemata.

The contest was won by the independent conservative candidate William Massey. Massey somewhat narrowly beat the Liberal candidate Jackson Palmer recording only a 173-vote majority.

== Background ==
The seat was declared vacant when sitting MP Richard Monk had his election declared void. Opposition supporters in the Waitemata area sent a telegram to Massey asking him to stand in the by-election on their behalf. Massey was allegedly atop a haystack when the telegram arrived and it was passed up to him on a pitchfork. He decided to accept. Massey's nomination for the election also came under scrutiny, with a written objection being lodged against him on the alleged ground that one of the men who nominated him was not qualified to do so. Massey was supported by the National Association.

Massey's only opponent was Paeroa lawyer Jackson Palmer, an Independent Liberal, who had won the Waitemata seat previously, in the 1890 election. Fellow conservative Eden George also intended to stand, but ultimately withdrew from the contest. William Joseph Napier also had received a requisition from electors to stand.

== Results ==
The following table gives the election results:

1894 Waitemata by-election
Party	Candidate	Votes	%	±%
Conservative	William Massey	1,619	52.82	
Independent Liberal	Jackson Palmer	1,446	47.17	
Majority		173	5.64	
Turnout		3,065		

Monk won the electorate again in 1896, and retired in 1902. Massey stood successfully for Franklin in 1896 and was to stay in Parliament for the remaining 31 years of his life, serving as Prime Minister (1912–25). Palmer would later win the seat of Ohinemuri in the election of 1899.
