= 1874 Waitemata by-elections =

Two New Zealand by-elections

The 1874 Waitemata by-elections were two by-elections held on 28 July and 8 September 1874 in the Waitemata electorate during the 5th New Zealand Parliament.

The first (28 July) by-election was caused by the resignation of the incumbent MP Thomas Henderson on 24 April 1874.

The first by-election was won by Gustav von der Heyde. William Lee Rees had been nominated but subsequently decided not to stand. This by-election was challenged by petition, as von der Heyde had not yet been naturalised.

However the second (8 September) by-election confirmed von der Heyde as the MP.

In both by-elections he was challenged by John Sangster Macfarlane, who subsequently won the seat in the 1876 general election. Macfarlane favoured abolition of the provinces, and said that the Provincial government was against him.

== Results ==
The following tables gives the election results:

- July 1874 Waitemata by-election
  Party	Candidate	Votes	%	±%
  Independent	Gustav von der Heyde	287	54.77	
  Independent	John Sangster Macfarlane	237	45.23	
  Majority		50	9.54	
  Turnout		524		

The poll totals for 8 September exclude 18 double votes for von der Heyde, 20 double votes for Macfarlane and 6 informal votes.

- September 1874 Waitemata by-election
  Party	Candidate	Votes	%	±%
  Independent	Gustav von der Heyde	271	56.46	
  Independent	John Sangster Macfarlane	209	43.53	
  Majority		62	12.92	
  Turnout		480		
