= Gustav von der Heyde =

New Zealand politician (1836–1891)

Member of the New Zealand Parliament for Waitemata
- Preceded by: Thomas Henderson
- Succeeded by: John Sangster Macfarlane
- In office 28 July 1874 – 21 August 1874
- In office 8 September 1874 – 6 December 1875

Personal details
- Born: 1834 Bremen, German Confederation
- Died: 29 June 1891 (aged 56–57) Sydney, Colony of New South Wales
- Spouse: Mary Henderson (m. 1864)
- Relations: Thomas Henderson (father-in-law)
- Profession: Businessman, politician, consul

Gustav Ludwig Theodor von der Heyde (1836–1891) was a 19th-century German-born Auckland businessman. In 1874, he became the Member of Parliament for the Waitemata electorate in Auckland, New Zealand.

== Biography ==
New Zealand Parliament
Years	Term	Electorate	Party
1874	5th	Waitemata	Independent
1874–1875	5th	Waitemata	Independent

Von der Heyde was born in Bremen in 1834, the eldest son of a businessman. He emigrated to Australia in 1854, working at the Bremen Consulate in Adelaide from 1858 to 1860. Upon the death of John Macfarlane, Von der Heyde became one of the directors of the Henderson & Macfarlane shipping and logging company.

From 1870 to 1874, Von der Heyde was the chairman of the Auckland Chamber of Commerce. In 1871, he was elected to the Waitakerei East Highways District Board, and was a member of the Auckland Harbour Board from 1871 to 1874.

He represented the Waitemata electorate in 1874, which was called after the resignation of Thomas Henderson on 12 June 1874. Von der Heyde represented the electorate from 28 July to 21 August, when he was unseated on a petition. His main political rival, John Sangster Macfarlane, and his supporters, petitioned the Government over the eligibility of Von der Heyde to be a Member of Parliament, due to his German birth. Von der Heyde produced papers showing his naturalisation as a British subject in the Colony of South Australia, however the petition questioned if his naturalisation applied to other parts of the British Empire, or merely the Colony of South Australia. As the South Australian naturalisation law granted naturalised citizens all of the same rights as British citizens, except the ability to become a member of a council or legislature, the election was voided. On 11 August, the executive council approved the naturalisation of Von der Heyde in New Zealand, and on 8 September, a second by-election was held. Von der Heyde was re-elected with a greater majority.

On 15 July 1875, became a member of the Auckland City Council. He remained a Member of Parliament until his resignation on 6 December 1875. As a member, Von der Heyde posed questions on public acts works, such as ports and railways projects. Von der Heyde remained on the Auckland City Council until 1877.

Later in life, Von der Heyde was a consul for Germany, however his role in the Henderson & Macfarlane company caused conflicts of interest, and he stood down from the position. He died in Sydney on 29 June 1891.

== Personal life ==
Von der Heyde married Mary Henderson, daughter of Thomas Henderson, on 11 February 1864 in Melbourne. Between 1865 and 1876, the Von der Heydes had six children. He was an active member of the German community in New Zealand.

== Notes ==
=== References ===
- Northcote-Bade, James (1992). "Gustav von der Heyde: Director of Henderson & Macfarlane and Waitemata M.P.". West Auckland Remembers. Vol. 2. West Auckland Historical Society. pp. 77–89. ISBN 0-473-01587-0.
- Wilson, Jim (1985) [First ed. published 1913]. New Zealand Parliamentary Record, 1840–1984 (4th ed.). Wellington: V.R. Ward, Govt. Printer. OCLC 154283103.

New Zealand Parliament
Preceded by Thomas Henderson	Member of Parliament for Waitemata; 1874–1875	Succeeded by John Macfarlane
