= General Assembly House =

First building to house the New Zealand Parliament in Auckland

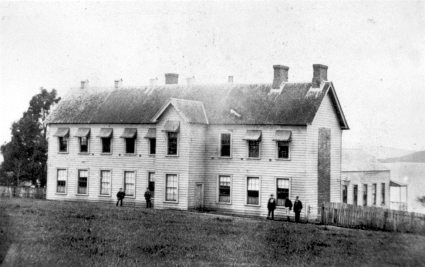
- The General Assembly House in Auckland in 1861, known as the "Shedifice"
- Interactive map of the General Assembly House area

General information
- Architectural style: none
- Location: Auckland, New Zealand
- Coordinates: 36.849204°S 174.773425°E
- Construction started: March 1854
- Completed: May 1854
- Opened: 24 May 1854
- Demolished: December 1917

Design and construction
- Architect: Reader Wood

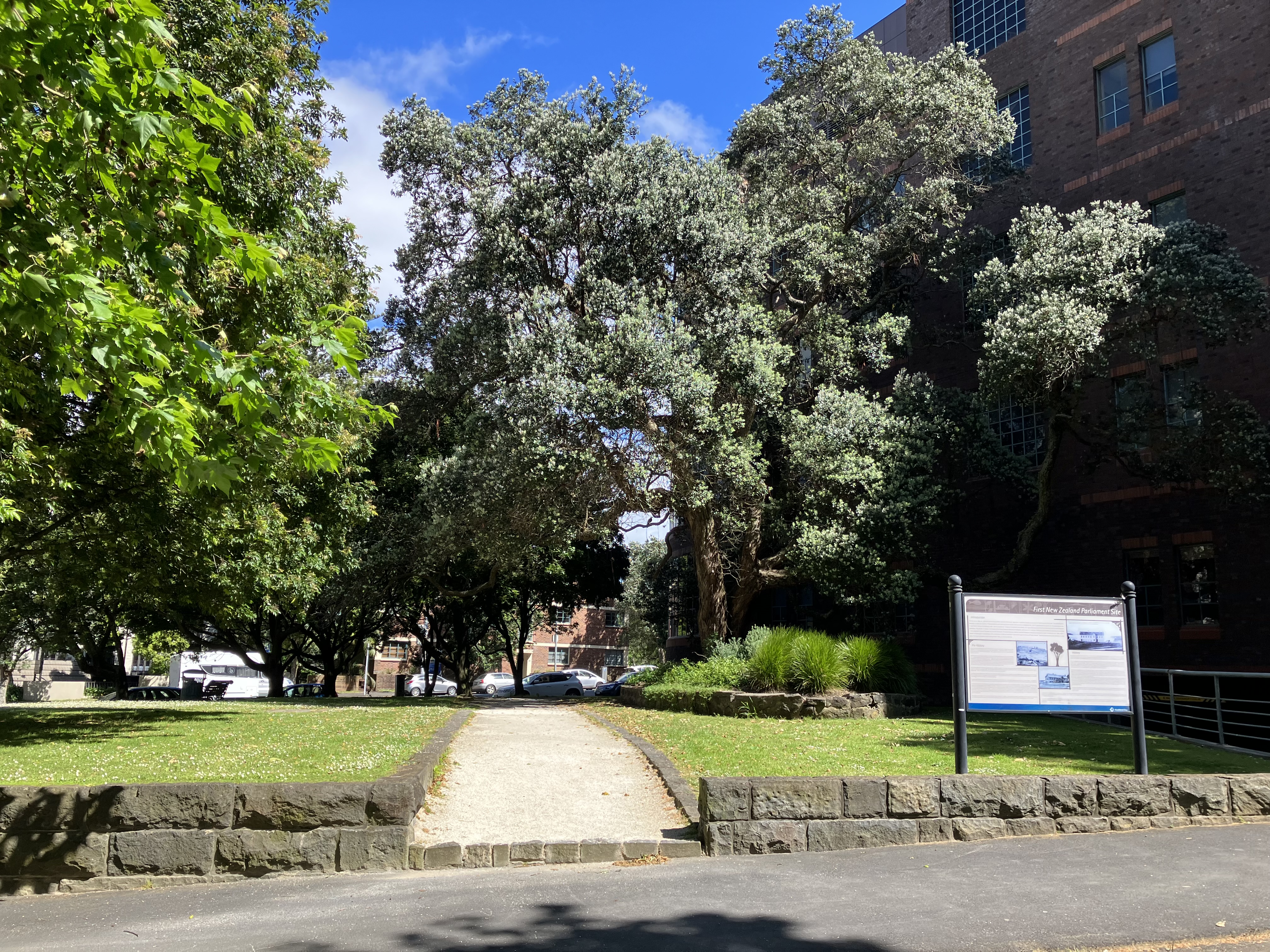
Parliament Reserve marks the former location of the General Assembly House

The General Assembly House, colloquially called "Shedifice" by the members of Parliament, was the first building to house the New Zealand Parliament in Auckland. It was in use by Parliament from 1854 until 1864 during the time that Auckland was the capital of New Zealand. It was also used by the Auckland Provincial Council, with Auckland Province owning the building from 1858. After the abolition of the provincial government system, the building was used by the government's survey department and was then used by Auckland University College. The General Assembly House was demolished in 1917 to make way for Anzac Avenue. Today, a reserve adjacent to Parliament Street called Parliament Reserve commemorates the location where the New Zealand Parliament met initially.

== History ==
=== Context ===
Auckland was New Zealand's second capital from 1841 until 1865, when Parliament was permanently moved to Wellington after an argument that lasted for a decade. The initial form of government was an executive council formed of public servants appointed by and responsible to the governor. This changed when the New Zealand Constitution Act 1852, an Act of the Parliament of the United Kingdom that granted self-government to the Colony of New Zealand, was received. This allowed for a bicameral General Assembly (or Parliament), consisting of the governor, an appointed Legislative Council and an elected House of Representatives, with an Executive Council nominally appointed by the governor. It also allowed for provincial governments, and six provinces were initially established. The first general election was held in 1853.

=== Use for Parliament ===
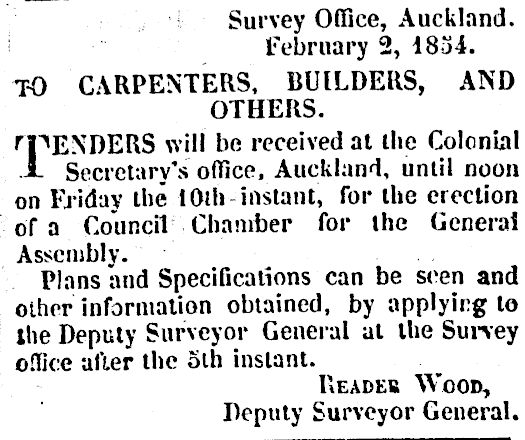
Invitation for construction tender

On 18 January 1854, Parliament was first summoned to meet in Auckland on 24 May of that year, i.e. on Queen Victoria's birthday. There was no suitable building for the General Assembly, as it was then called, to meet in Auckland. Reader Wood, who was deputy surveyor-general, was tasked with designing a suitable meeting house that could be used by the survey department during the parliamentary recess. Tenders were called for in early February 1854 and the contract awarded on 3 March for £2,572. During construction, the decision was made to increase the building in length by 8 feet (2.4 m) at either end, but despite this variation, the building was "reasonably complete" by 23 May. Despite labour shortage (the Victorian gold rush attracted much of the labour force) and poor weather, the building progressed quickly and was ready in time.

The first meeting of parliamentarians was held on 24 May, followed by a levee of Colonel Robert Wynyard, the administrator of the government. In the evening, a ball was held in the chamber of the House of Representatives. Of the 420 invited guests, only 200 could make it due to the poor weather. The chamber was a hall that normally had seating as opposed to being fitted out as a meeting place, and hence it could be used for a ball.

The House of Representatives decided that it should first elect a speaker before Parliament could be formally opened. Charles Clifford found unanimous support and Wynyard as acting governor formally opened Parliament on Saturday, 27 May 1854.

Sessions of Parliament and Auckland Provincial Council
User / Session	Opened	Adjourned
1st NZP 1	24 May 1854	17 August 1854
1st NZP 2	31 August 1854	16 September 1854
1st APC 2	25 October 1854	18 January 1855
1st APC 3	26 March 1855	1 May 1855
1st NZP 3	8 August 1855	15 September 1855
1st APC 4	15 August 1855 (Note: During the overlap period, the Provincial Council met at the Mechanics' Institute)	21 September 1855
2nd APC 5	28 January 1856	23 April 1856 (Note: During the overlap period, the Provincial Council met at the Mechanics' Institute)
2nd NZP 1	15 April 1856	16 August 1856
2nd APC 6	9 December 1856	19 February 1857
2nd APC 7	17 August 1857	24 March 1858
3rd APC 8	25 November 1857	24 March 1858
2nd NZP 2 (Note: Parliament did not meet during 1857)	10 August 1858	21 August 1858
3rd APC 9	4 October 1858	23 December 1858
3rd APC 10	2 May 1859	12 May 1859
3rd APC 11	11 July 1859	1 November 1859
3rd APC 12	31 January 1860	1 June 1860
2nd NZP 3 (Note: Parliament did not meet during 1859)	30 July 1860	5 November 1860
3rd APC 13	21 November 1860	27 February 1861
3rd NZP 1	3 June 1861	7 September 1861
4th APC 14	6 January 1862	7 May 1862
4th APC 15	27 December 1862	21 April 1863
4th APC 16	25 September 1863	11 February 1864 (Note: Subsequent to adjournment, the Provincial Council met in the library attached to the General Assembly House)
3rd NZP 3 (Note: Parliament met in Wellington during 1862)	19 October 1863	14 December 1863
4th APC 17	5 October 1864	17 November 1864
3rd NZP 4 (Note: Parliament permanently moved to Wellington after 1864)	24 November 1864	13 December 1864
4th APC 18	21 December 1864	11 May 1865
5th APC 19	12 December 1865	21 March 1866
5th APC 20	12 November 1866	8 February 1867
5th APC 21	17 June 1867	26 June 1867
5th APC 22	28 November 1867	5 March 1868
5th APC 23	15 June 1868	2 July 1868
5th APC 24	7 December 1868	2 March 1869
6th APC 25	19 January 1870	18 February 1870
6th APC 26	26 October 1870	31 January 1871
6th APC 27	22 November 1871	22 December 1871
6th APC 28	19 November 1872	17 December 1872
7th APC 29	16 December 1873	19 December 1873
7th APC 29	1 May 1874	17 June 1874
7th APC 30	10 May 1875	28 May 1875

Table footnotes

The General Assembly House was also used for meetings of the Auckland Provincial Council. This arrangement generally worked well, as many members of Parliament were also members of one of the provincial councils of New Zealand, and the provincial council sessions were thus generally scheduled to not clash with sessions of Parliament. Only when sessions had to be called at short notice did clashes occur. The first such clash occurred in mid-August 1855, when Parliament was still in session and the superintendent of Auckland Province, William Brown, called the fourth session of the Auckland Provincial Council, which was held at the Mechanics' Institute instead. The second clash occurred in April 1856, when the fifth session of the Auckland Provincial Council had not finished when the first session of the 2nd New Zealand Parliament began; the provincial councillors once again moved to the Mechanics' Institute. The third and last clash occurred in late 1863, when the provincial council had not finished its session in time for the parliamentary session that was to begin on 19 October 1863. On Friday, 16 October, the provincial council adjourned until Saturday, 28 November. Parliament had not finished its session by then, but took a rest day for the provincial council to be able to use the chamber. Rather than again adjourn its business, the provincial council decided to meet, from the following week, in the library room attached to the General Assembly House.

=== Ownership changes and fate ===
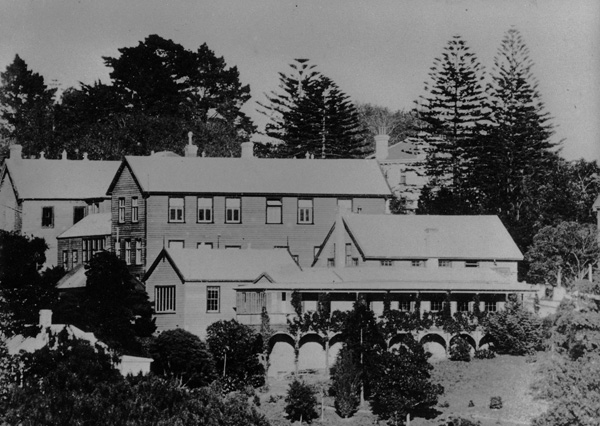
The collection of buildings, c. 1900, when they were in use by the Auckland University College

In late 1858, the ownership of the building transferred to Auckland Province, but with an agreement that Parliament would continue to use it, and it continued to be referred to as the General Assembly House. After 1858, some additions were made to the building. The system of provincial government was abolished in 1876 and ownership transferred back to the Crown. In 1883, the building additions that initially housed Auckland's district (or magistrates) court were made available to the newly established Auckland University College, and laboratories and lecture rooms for the chemistry department were established here. The original part of the building remained for use by the Survey and Crown Lands Department. Parliament passed the Auckland University College Reserves Act 1885 and that allowed for the main building and the land it was on to also be transferred to the college, which happened in 1890. The college used the meeting room of the House of Representatives for general and mathematics lectures. The lower story of the original building became the college library and the registrar's office. The former Bellamy's (parliamentary refreshment room, i.e. a club where liquor could be purchased) in an adjacent building became the office of the college chairman. The college's geology museum was housed in the buildings, as were lecture rooms for classics and a girls' common room.

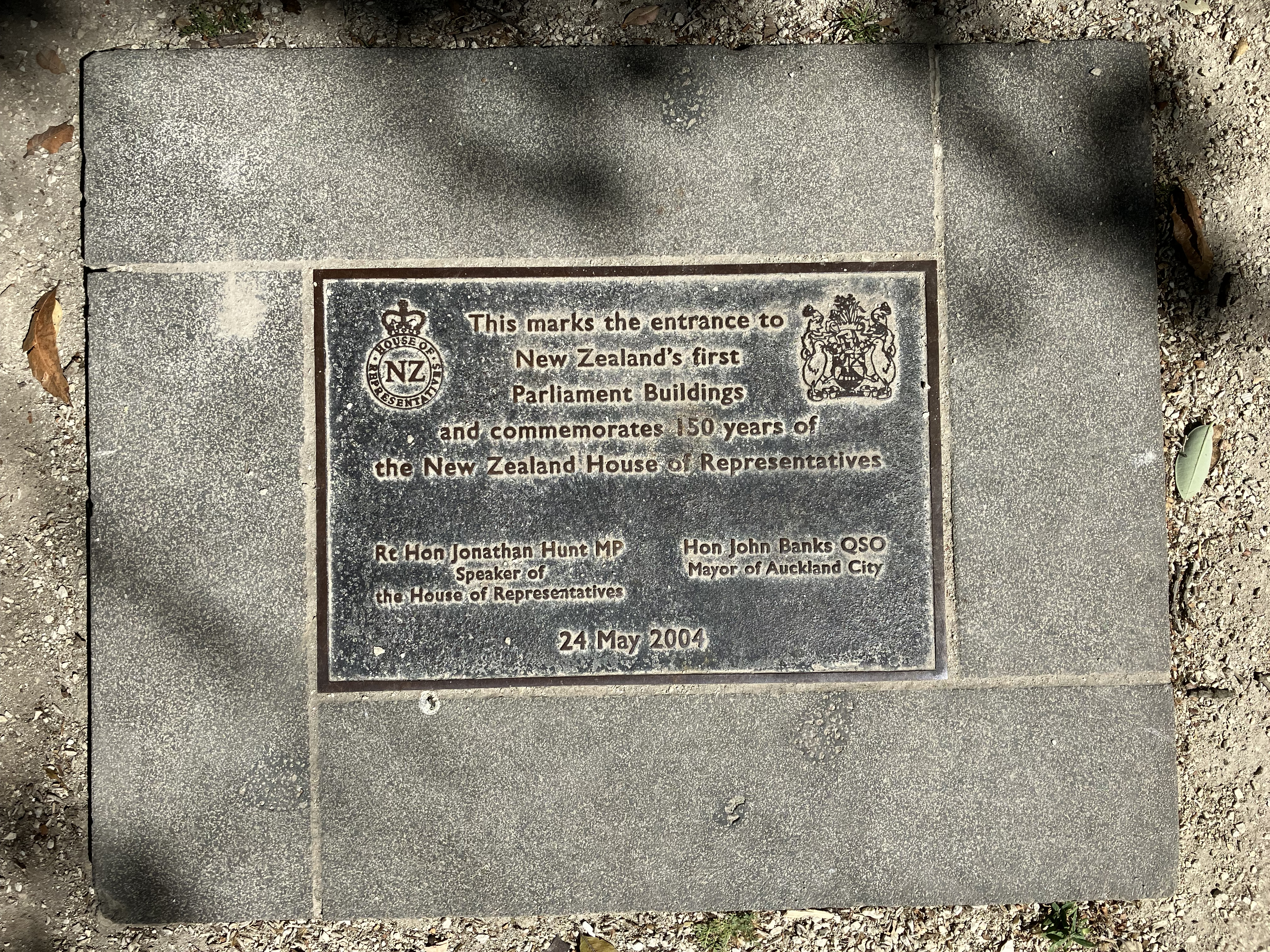
A plaque in Parliament Reserve marks the entrance to the buildings

The Mayor of Auckland City, James Gunson, held a civic reception in the buildings on 15 November 1917 to mark the historic significance just prior to demolition. The buildings were demolished to make way for Anzac Avenue, a new eastern arterial road. A year later, Eden Street was renamed Parliament Street. Today, Parliament Reserve, a reserve adjacent to Anzac Avenue and Parliament Street and behind the Auckland High Court, marks the former location of the buildings. A plaque unveiled in the reserve in 1956 commemorates the location of the General Assembly House. On 24 May 2004, on the 150th anniversary of the first meeting of Parliament, a basalt platform delineating the outline of the original buildings and a second plaque marking the entrance to the buildings were unveiled in the reserve.

== Architecture ==
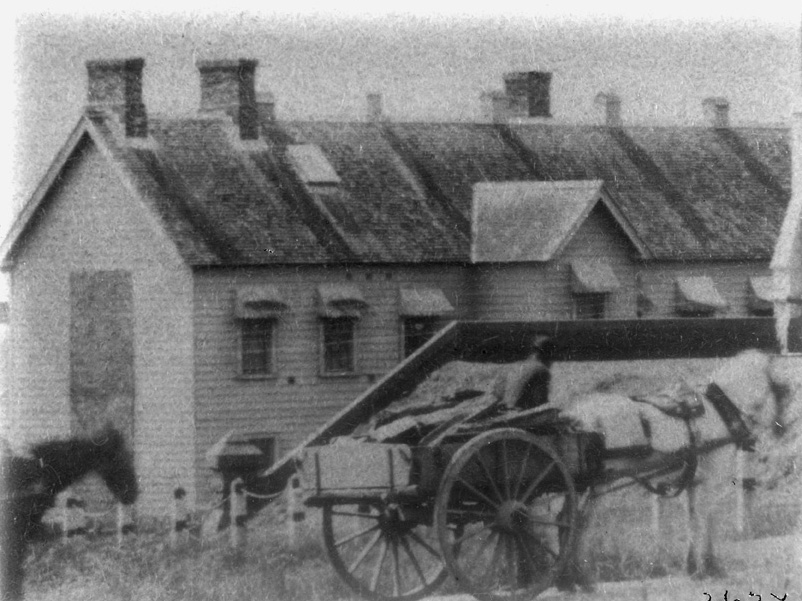
The General Assembly House in the 1870s

The quality of the first meeting house for the New Zealand Parliament found little favour. The Daily Southern Cross called it a "wretched, ill-constructed building". The building was drafty and the roof leaked. Henry Sewell, New Zealand's first premier after responsible government had been granted in 1856, described the meeting chamber of the House of Representatives and the building in general as follows:

The Room of moderate size—plain and with no architectural pretension whatever. The whole building is of the most undecorated style—a great wooden barnshaped affair, which might serve for a Hospital, a Jail, or a Barrack—or if gutted be turned into a Methodist Meeting house—very incommodiously arranged, and the first thing we have to do is to turn all the interior arrangements topsy turvy.

It is believed that the original building measured 65 by 20 feet (19.8 by 6.1 m). The building had two storeys and curiously, the Upper House (i.e. the Legislative Council) met on the lower storey, and the Lower House (i.e. the House of Representatives) met on the upper storey.
