= Alexander Harris (New Zealand politician) =

New Zealand politician (1878–1952)

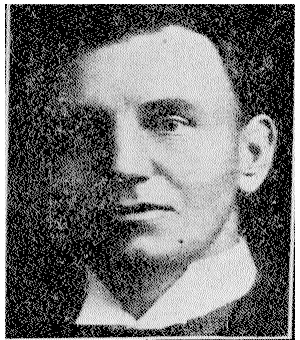
Photograph of Alexander Harris

Alexander Harris (1878 – 24 August 1952) was a Member of Parliament for the Waitemata electorate in Auckland, New Zealand.

== Birth and education ==
He was born in London in 1878, and educated at Dulwich College, London.

== Member of Parliament ==
New Zealand Parliament
Years	Term	Electorate	Party
1911–1914	18th	Waitemata	Reform
1914–1919	19th	Waitemata	Reform
1919–1922	20th	Waitemata	Reform
1922–1925	21st	Waitemata	Reform
1925–1927	22nd	Waitemata	Reform
1927–1928	Changed allegiance to:		Independent
1928–1931	23rd	Waitemata	Independent
1931–1935	24th	Waitemata	Independent

Alexander Harris represented Waitemata in the House of Representatives for 24 years from 1911 to 1935.

=== Independent ===
In July 1927, Alex Harris publicly stated that he wanted more "freedom of action" and announced that he had "no intention of attending any caucuses of the Reform Party".

Harris and his colleague, Vivian Potter, were opposed to Gordon Coates and his moves to introduce public ferries and buses to compete with private enterprise in Auckland; an approach they regarded as "socialist". In retaliation, Coates removed Harris from his position as Chairman of the Commerce Select Committee.

== Notes ==
New Zealand Parliament
Preceded by Leonard Phillips	Member of Parliament for Waitemata; 1911–1935	Succeeded by Jack Lyon
