= John Sangster Macfarlane =

New Zealand politician

New Zealand Parliament
Years	Term	Electorate	Party
1876–1879	6th	Waitemata	Independent

John Sangster Macfarlane (1818 – 2 February 1880) was a 19th-century Member of Parliament in Auckland, New Zealand.

He unsuccessfully contested the 1873 by-election for Mongonui and Bay of Islands, and the 1874 by-election for Waitemata.

He then represented the Waitemata electorate from 1876 to 1879, when he was defeated.

He was born in Haddington, East Lothian, Scotland and arrived in Auckland via Sydney. He died in Auckland on 2 February 1880 from cancer of the stomach.

Two or three years before his death he lost a bet that a "prominent politician" would soon be in Mt Eden (gaol) and Swanson kept and showed but did not cash the cheque for £80 he received from Macfarlane.

New Zealand Parliament
Preceded by Gustav von der Heyde	Member of Parliament for Waitemata; 1876–1879	Succeeded by Reader Wood
