= Jack Lyon =

New Zealand politician

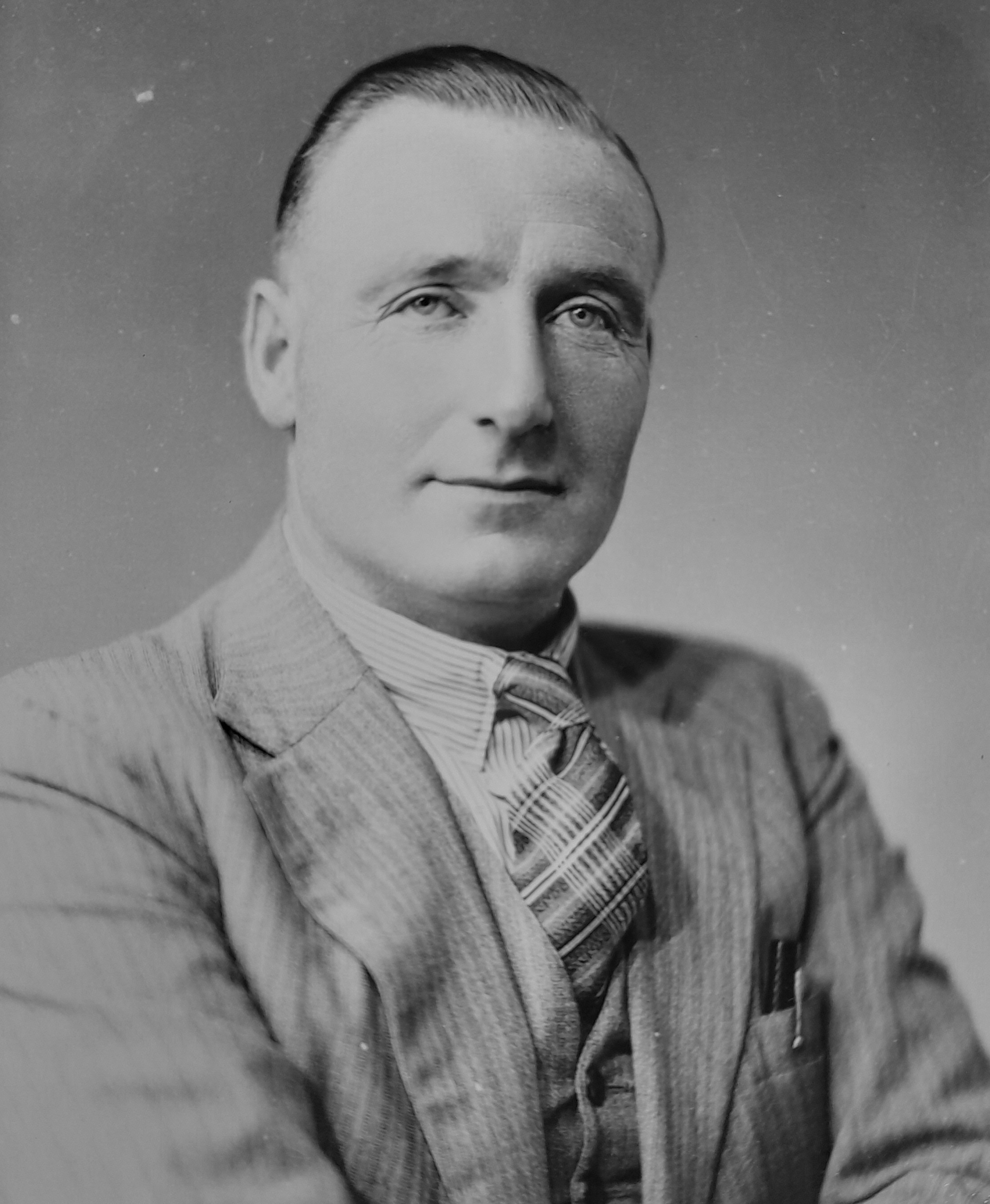

Member of the New Zealand Parliament for Waitemata
- In office 28 November 1935 – 26 May 1941
- Preceded by: Alexander Harris
- Succeeded by: Mary Dreaver

Personal details
- Born: 15 February 1898 London, United Kingdom
- Died: 26 May 1941 (aged 43) Crete
- Cause of death: Killed in action
- Party: Labour
- Spouse: Alice Elizabeth (Alison) Lyon
- Children: 2

Military service
- Branch/service: British Army; New Zealand Military Forces
- Years of service: 1915–1919; 1939–1941
- Rank: Captain
- Battles/wars: First World War; Second World War; Battle of Greece; Battle of Crete †

William John Lyon (15 February 1898 – 26 May 1941) was a New Zealand politician of the Labour Party. He was killed in World War II while serving with the 2nd New Zealand Expeditionary Force.

== Early life and career ==
Lyon was born in London, England, and educated at a Brighton Grammar School. He won a scholarship to the University of Oxford, but did not take it up as he enlisted in the British Army aged 17. During World War I, while serving on the western front, he was twice mentioned in dispatches and his health was damaged by mustard gas. He was promoted to a non-commissioned officer and later was an officer in the Royal Sussex Regiment and military intelligence.

After leaving the military he worked as a linguist and cypher translator at the Foreign Office.

== Local politics ==
Lyon was active in the UK Labour Party. As a member of the Mitcham branch he was a party organiser in the 1921 local elections and 1924 general election.

Due to his health, still impaired by the mustard gas attack, he emigrated to New Zealand in 1927 where he lived in Hastings gaining work as a rubber vulcaniser. Lyon joined the Labour Party in 1928 and was elected a member of the Hastings Borough Council and Napier Harbour Board in 1929 before moving to Auckland in 1931.

In Auckland he became president of the Auckland Provincial Unemployed Workers' Association and president of the Auckland Association Football Association. In 1935 he stood unsuccessfully for the Auckland City Council on a Labour Party ticket.

== Member of Parliament ==
New Zealand Parliament
Years	Term	Electorate	Party
1935–1938	25th	Waitemata	Labour
1938–1941	26th	Waitemata	Labour

Lyon contested the Hawkes Bay electorate in the 1928 election, but was beaten by the incumbent, Hugh Campbell of the Reform Party. As a Labour Party MP, he represented the Waitemata electorate from the 1935 general election to 1941.

Lyon was an ideological ally of John A. Lee and became a leading advocate for credit reform in the Labour Party. His interest in monetary reform led him to become part of a small group of backbenchers that assisted Walter Nash, the Minister of Finance, along with Ormond Wilson and Arnold Nordmeyer. Lyon twice moved in caucus that the Bank of New Zealand be nationalised, but was ignored by Prime Minister Michael Joseph Savage who was opposed to the idea. He was later a member of a caucus committee tasked with drafting the party's social security policies which later became the Social Security Act 1938.

Lyon, one of the few First World War veterans in the Labour caucus, strongly supported New Zealand's participation in World War II and had tabled a minority report at the 1939 party conference calling for a greater recruiting effort.

While initially an ideological ally of Lee, Lyon was disgusted with Lee's 'Psycho-pathology in politics' article which contained vicious personal attacks on Savage (who was dying of cancer). He was so infuriated thar he ripped up the copy he was reading. He wrote to Nash shortly before his death, that while he still shared Lee's views that reforms could have gone further and faster, Lee's conduct had gone too far stating "What a tragedy it was that personal issues were allowed to obscure political ideology and the culminating tragedy, the death of our beloved leader. I realise more than ever how puerile some of our fights in caucus were and how ridiculous it was that most of our discussions took place in an atmosphere of distrust and suspicion and the comradeship of 1935 was allowed to be dissipated."

== Death ==
With the outbreak of war, Lyon enlisted in the New Zealand Military Forces, and was a Captain with the 18th Battalion when he was killed during the Battle of Crete. He was survived by his wife and two daughters.

Out of respect to Lyon, the National Party decided not to contest the by-election resulting from his death. The by-election resulted in the return of the third woman to the New Zealand House of Representatives, Labour's Mary Dreaver. His widow Alison considered but, after receiving medical advice, opted not to accept nomination to stand for the seat.

== Notes ==
New Zealand Parliament
Preceded by Alexander Harris	Member of Parliament for Waitemata; 1935–1941	Succeeded by Mary Dreaver
