= Jackson Palmer =

New Zealand politician, lawyer and judge

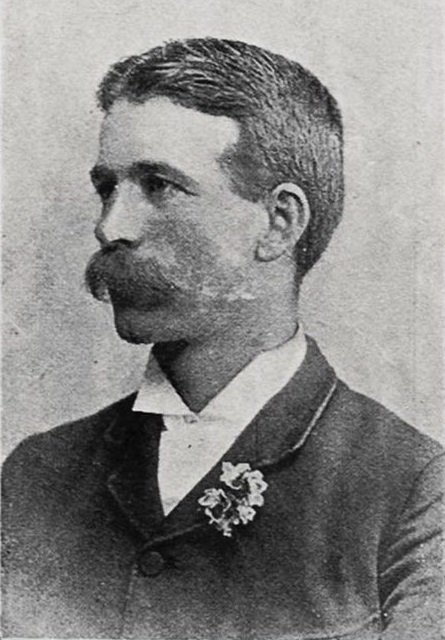
- Palmer in 1902.

Member of the New Zealand Parliament for Waitemata
- In office 1890–1893
- Preceded by: Richard Monk
- Succeeded by: Richard Monk

Member of the New Zealand Parliament for Ohinemuri
- In office 1899–1902
- Preceded by: Alfred Cadman
- Succeeded by: Edward Moss

Personal details
- Born: 1867 Belfast, Ireland
- Died: 13 August 1919 (aged 52) Wellington, New Zealand
- Resting place: Karori Cemetery
- Party: Independent Liberal
- Occupation: Politician, lawyer and judge

Jackson Palmer (1867 – 13 August 1919) was the Member of Parliament for Waitemata and Ohinemuri, in the North Island of New Zealand.

== Early life ==
Born in Belfast, Ireland, Palmer came to New Zealand as an infant. He was educated at Auckland Grammar School and was a lawyer at Paeroa. Later, Jackson Palmer was chief judge of the Native Land Court.

== Member of Parliament ==
New Zealand Parliament
Years	Term	Electorate	Party
1890–1893	11th	Waitemata	Independent Liberal
1899–1902	14th	Ohinemuri	Independent Liberal

In 1887 Palmer stood for Parliament unsuccessfully in the Rodney electorate. He then represented the Waitemata (1890–1893) and Ohinemuri (1899–1902) electorates in the New Zealand House of Representatives. In-between he unsuccessfully contested a by-election for the Waitemata seat in 1894, which was won by future Prime Minister William Massey.

For his entire political career Palmer was an Independent Liberal. He declined the Premier John Ballance's invitation to join the Council of the Liberal Federation in 1891.

Palmer died in Wellington on 13 August 1919, and was buried at Karori Cemetery.

New Zealand Parliament
Preceded by Richard Monk	Member of Parliament for Waitemata; 1890–1893	Succeeded by Richard Monk
Preceded by Alfred Cadman	Member of Parliament for Ohinemuri; 1899–1902	Succeeded by Edward Moss
