= 1941 Waitemata by-election =

New Zealand by-election

← 1938 general	19 July 1941	1943 general →
- Turnout: 9,794 (70.31%)
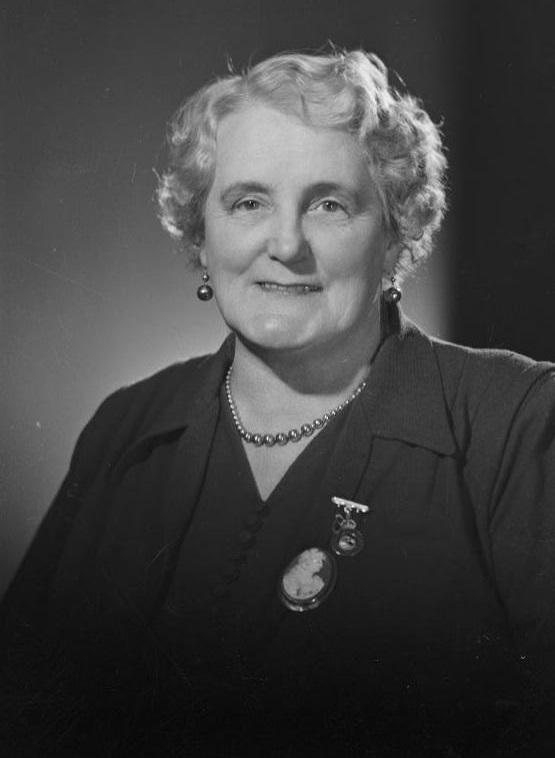

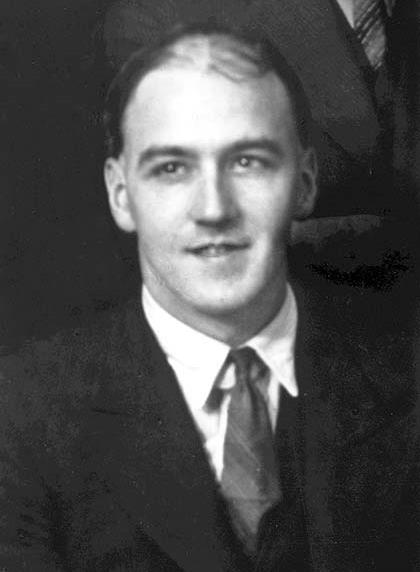
Candidate	Mary Dreaver	William Darlow	Norman Douglas
Party	Labour	Independent National	Democratic Labour
Popular vote	4,396	3,884	940
MP before election
Jack Lyon
Labour
Elected MP
Mary Dreaver
Labour

The Waitemata by-election was held on 19 July 1941 was caused by the death of Jack Lyon during the term of the 26th New Zealand Parliament. Mary Dreaver of the Labour Party won the by-election; she was the third woman elected to the House of Representatives.

== Background and candidates ==
Mary Dreaver was chosen as the Labour Party candidate. Previously, she had unsuccessfully sought Labour nomination for the 1930 by-election in the Parnell electorate and Grey Lynn electorate in 1931. In the 1938 election she stood for Labour in Remuera, coming second. Lyon's widow Alison considered but, after receiving medical advice, opted not to accept nomination to stand for the seat.

The National Party chose not to stand an official candidate for the by-election. However, William Brockway Darlow entered the contest as an "independent" National candidate. He was subsequently endorsed by the National Party for the next general election scheduled to take place later that year, but was postponed until 1943 due to World War II. Darlow had previously contested the seat in 1931 for the United Party, one of National's predecessors.

Former Auckland City Councilor Norman Douglas stood for the Labour splinter group, the Democratic Labour Party (DLP). As was predicted, the inclusion of a Democratic Labour candidate split Labour's vote. He was president of the DLP's Grey Lynn branch, secretary of the district council and a member of the DLP national executive.

== Results ==
The following table contains the election results:

1941 Waitemata by-election
Party	Candidate	Votes	%	±%
Labour	Mary Dreaver	4,396	44.88	
Independent National	William Brockway Darlow	3,884	39.65	
Democratic Labour	Norman Douglas	940	9.59	
Independent	Peter Robertson Gardner	414	4.22	
Independent	Henry Thomas Head	88	0.89	
Informal votes		72	0.73	−0.14
Majority		512	5.22	
Turnout		9,794	70.31	−23.88

Dreaver became the third woman to enter New Zealand's House of Representatives. She was defeated in the next (1943) general election, by the National Party candidate, Henry Thorne Morton.
