= New Zealand Women's Land Army =

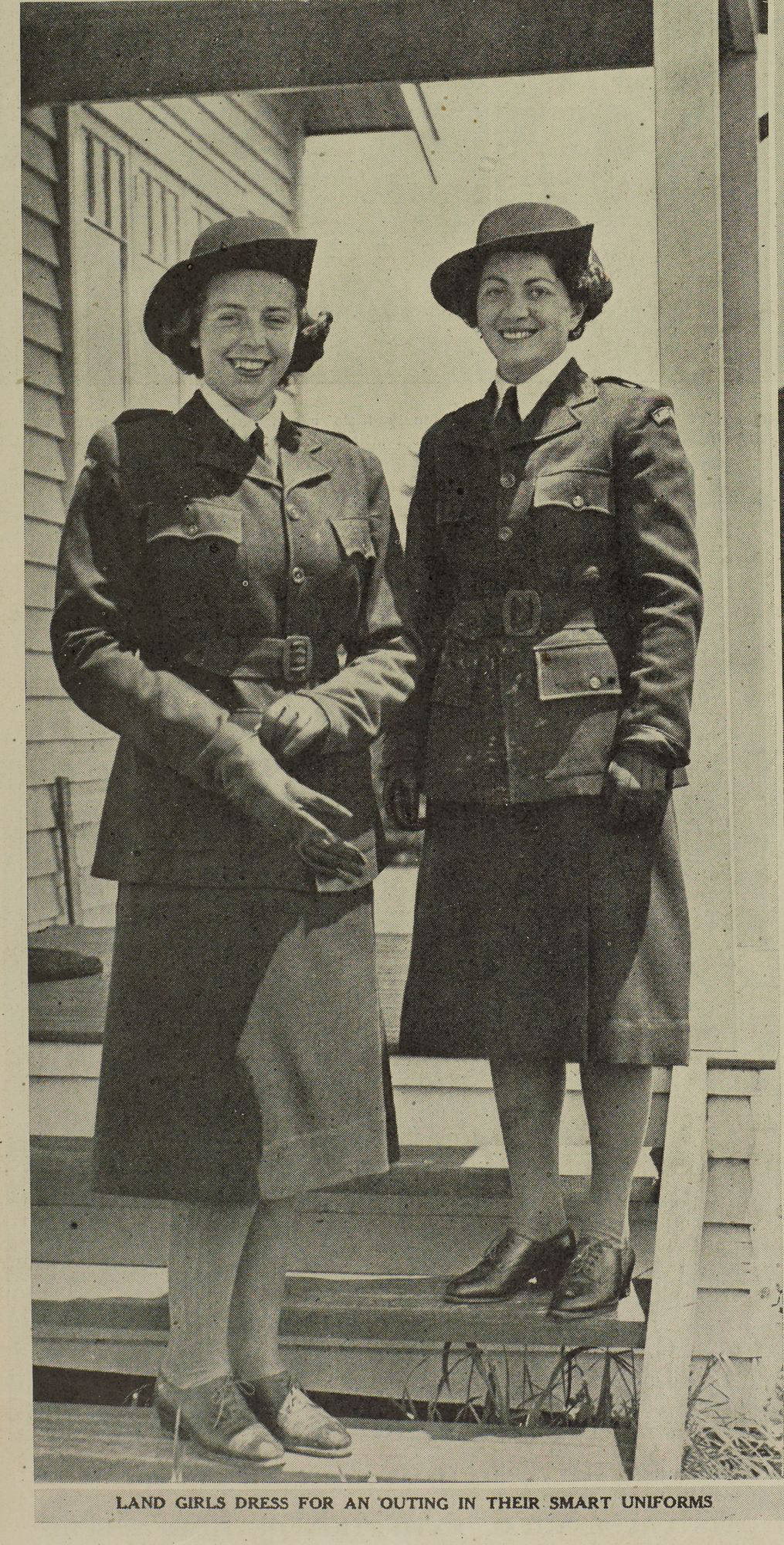
Land Army women in uniform

The New Zealand Women's Land Army or Women's Land Corps was formed to supply New Zealand's agriculture during the Second World War, with a function similar to its British namesake.

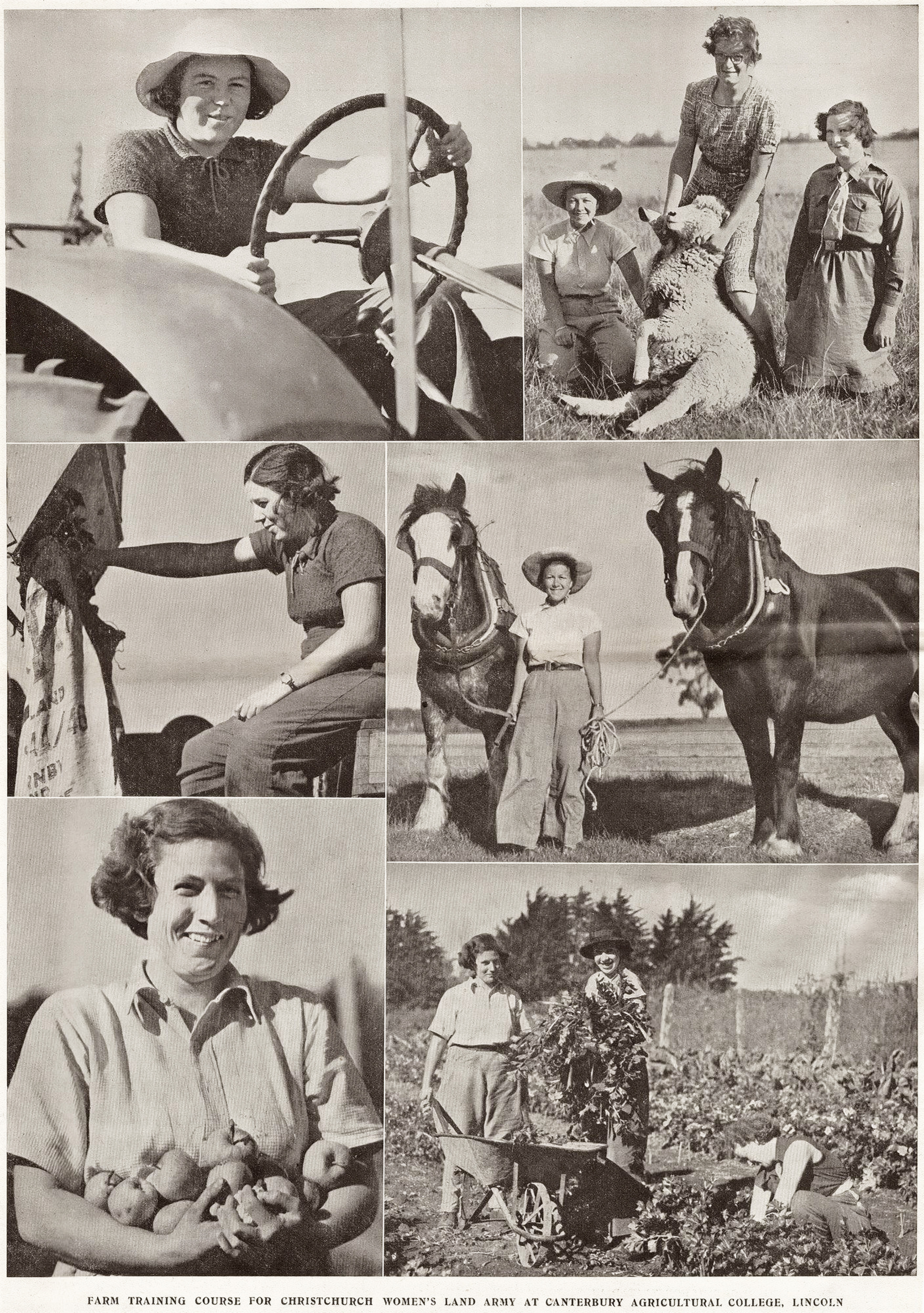
Land Army women at various tasks

The organisation in New Zealand began in an ad hoc manner with volunteer groups set up in various regions as it became apparent that there was an acute labour shortage due to the mobilisation of male farm workers. There was some opposition to formation of a women's land army. At a meeting of the Waikato branch of the Farmers' Union in May 1940, an attendee said “it is ridiculous to urge girls to work on farms when there are young men in shops doing work that girls could quite easily do”. A representative from the Women's Division of the Farmers' Union said that women should be trained for "domestic purposes" because home help was what was really wanted, and she did not consider it necessary to have a women's land army.

A group of paid workers was set up in Matamata in November 1940. In November 1941 the Government announced that it would establish a national Women's Land Corps. City girls from the age of 18 and up were "sent to assist on sheep, cattle, dairy, orchard and poultry properties". Recruitment of members was originally undertaken by the Women's War Service Auxiliary, but the scheme was reorganised in September 1942 and redeveloped as the Women's Land Service. With the reorganisation the basic wages were increased, the uniform and working clothes were liberalised, farmers could employ their relatives, and district Man-Power Officers became responsible for recruitment. These changes made the Service more attractive to both women and farmers and membership increased during the following two years.

Membership peaked in September 1944, when 2088 women were employed on farms, and declined after that due to the return of servicemen from overseas, women leaving to marry ex-servicemen and women resigning to take up better jobs. Recruitment stopped with the end of the war on 15th August 1945. A total of 2711 women were employed as members of the Service from the time it was reorganised in September 1942, making it the largest of the women's services raised by New Zealand during the war. The Service was disbanded in 1946.
