= Richard Monk =

New Zealand politician

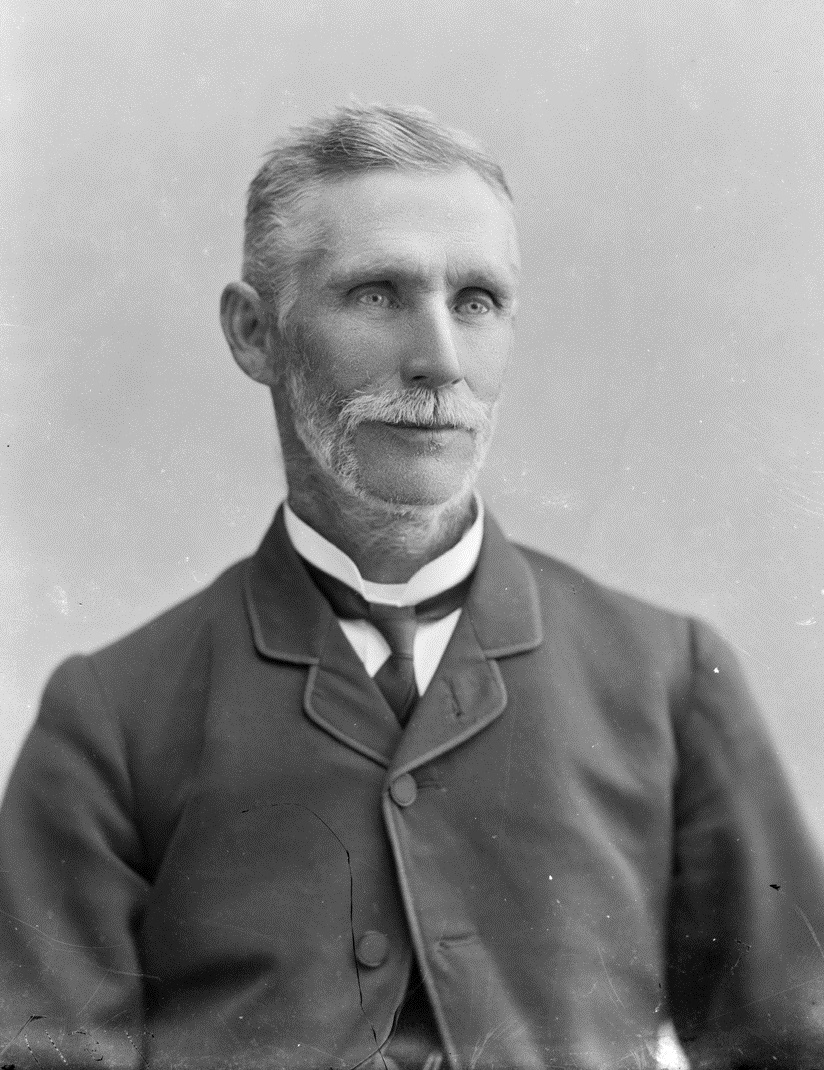
- Monk c. 1890s

Member of the New Zealand Parliament for Waitemata
- In office 1886–1890
- Preceded by: William Hurst
- Succeeded by: Jackson Palmer
- In office 1893–1894
- Preceded by: Jackson Palmer
- Succeeded by: William Massey
- In office 1896–1902
- Preceded by: William Massey
- Succeeded by: Ewen Alison

Personal details
- Born: 1833 Lancashire, England
- Died: 2 May 1912 (aged 80) Woodhill, New Zealand
- Resting place: Symonds Street Cemetery
- Party: Independent
- Occupation: Politician, businessman

Richard Monk (1833 – 2 May 1912) was a member of parliament in New Zealand.

== Biography ==
Richard Monk was born in Lancashire, England, and relocated to Hokianga with his parents at a young age. He was educated in California, US, and returned to New Zealand to work in the timber industry, setting up a joinery company named Messrs Monk and Morgan. Some time later Monk organised the Union Sash and Door Company which he remained with unil entering into politics in 1881.

He died at his home in Woodhill on 2 May 1912, aged 80, and was interred at Symonds Street Cemetery.

== Political career ==
New Zealand Parliament
Years	Term	Electorate	Party
1886–1887	9th	Waitemata	Independent
1887–1890	10th	Waitemata	Independent
1893–1894	12th	Waitemata	Independent
1896–1899	13th	Waitemata	Independent
1899–1902	14th	Waitemata	Independent

He represented the Waitemata electorate from the 1886 by-election after the death of William John Hurst to 1890 when he was defeated by Jackson Palmer; then from 1893 to 9 February 1894 when his election was declared void. He won the electorate again in 1896, and retired in 1902.

New Zealand Parliament
Preceded by William Hurst	Member of Parliament for Waitemata; 1886–1890; 1893–1894; 1896–1902	Succeeded by Jackson Palmer
Preceded by Jackson Palmer	Member of Parliament for Waitemata; 1886–1890; 1893–1894; 1896–1902	Succeeded by William Massey
Preceded by William Massey	Member of Parliament for Waitemata; 1886–1890; 1893–1894; 1896–1902	Succeeded by Ewen Alison
