= Charles Heaphy =

English explorer, recipient of the Victoria Cross and artist

Charles Heaphy VC
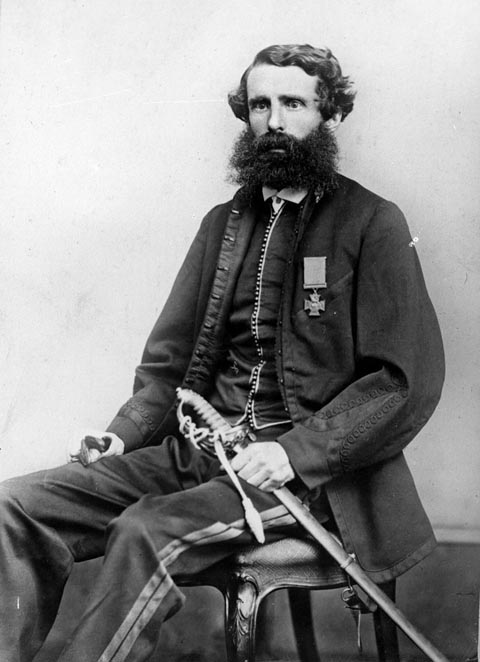
- Born: 1820; London, England
- Died: 3 August 1881 (aged 60–61); Brisbane, Australia
- Resting place: Toowong Cemetery, Brisbane, Australia
- Known for: Artist and surveyor Explorer
- Parent: Thomas Heaphy
- Military career
- Allegiance: New Zealand
- Service years: 1859–1867
- Rank: Major
- Units: Auckland Volunteer Rifles
- Conflicts: New Zealand Wars: Invasion of the Waikato
- Awards: Victoria Cross

Member of the New Zealand Parliament for Parnell
- In office 5 June 1867 – 13 April 1870
- Majority: Unopposed

Charles Heaphy VC (1820 – 3 August 1881) was an English-born New Zealand explorer and recipient of the Victoria Cross (VC), the highest military award for gallantry "in the face of the enemy" that could be awarded to British and Empire forces at the time. He was the first soldier of the New Zealand armed forces to be awarded the VC. He was also a noted artist of the colonial period who created watercolours and sketches of early settler life in New Zealand.

Born in England, Heaphy joined the New Zealand Company in 1839. He arrived in New Zealand later that year and was commissioned to make a visual record of the company's work which was used to advertise the country to potential English migrants. Much of the next 2 1/2 years was spent travelling around New Zealand and executing paintings of the land and its inhabitants. When his contract with the company ended in 1842, he lived in Nelson for several years and explored large parts of the West Coast. He later moved north to Auckland to take up employment as a surveyor.

During the invasion of the Waikato, his militia unit was mobilised and it was his conduct at Paterangi, where he rescued British soldiers under fire, that saw him awarded the VC. As well as being the first soldier of the New Zealand armed forces to receive the VC, he was the first recipient from any militia force. After his military service ended, Heaphy served a term as Member of Parliament for Parnell. From 1870 to 1881, he held a variety of civil service positions. In his later years, his health declined and he retired from public service in May 1881. He moved to Queensland, in Australia, seeking a better climate in which to recover his health but died a few months after his arrival. He is buried at Toowong Cemetery in Brisbane.

== Early life ==
Charles Heaphy was born sometime in 1820 in London, England. He was the youngest child of Thomas Heaphy, who was a professional painter, and three of his siblings also became noted painters. His grandfather John Gerrard Heaphy was a merchant from Ireland. Thomas Heaphy earned painting commissions from high society and in 1812 accompanied Arthur Wellesley, who was later to become the Duke of Wellington, as staff artist during the Peninsular War.

The Heaphy family lived in St John's Wood in north-west London and enjoyed a comfortable, middle-class existence although his mother died sometime during his early childhood. Thomas died in 1835 and left the entire estate to his second wife, who he had married in 1833. Charles, who had obtained work as a draughtsman at the London & Birmingham Railway Company, moved out of the family home soon after. As a child, he had been taught to paint by his father and in December 1837, sponsored by a family friend, he entered the Royal Academy school of painting. He was the only child of the Heaphy family to receive this level of education.

In May 1839, after 18 months at the Royal Academy, Heaphy joined the New Zealand Company as a draughtsman. The company was established by Edward Wakefield as a private venture to organise colonies in New Zealand. Wakefield sought well-educated men as staff for the planning and surveying of new settlements in the country. Heaphy sailed with William Wakefield, Edward's brother, aboard the Tory on an expedition to purchase land suitable for settlement. In late 1839, the Tory arrived in what became known as Wellington.

== Service with the New Zealand Company ==
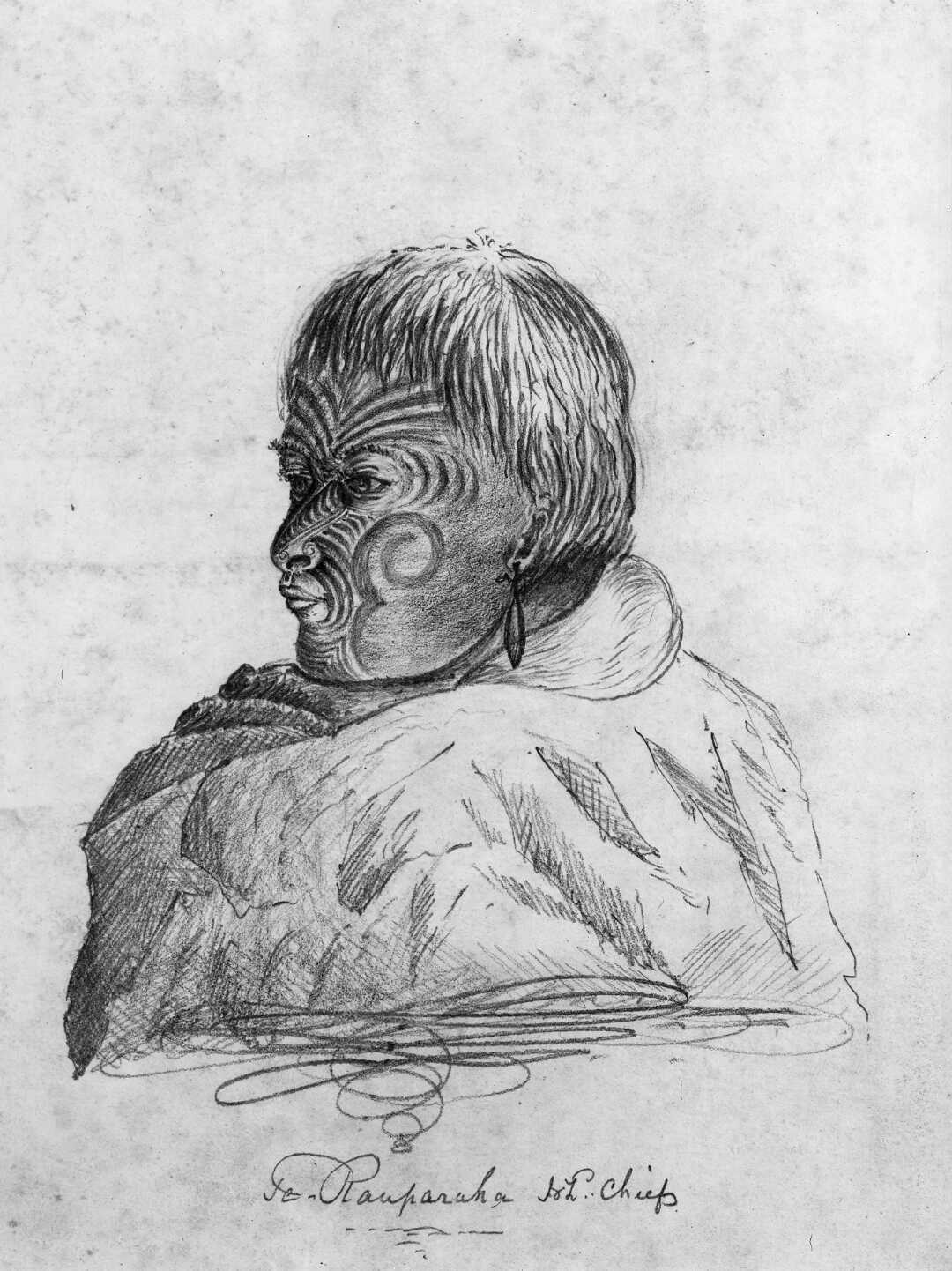
A sketch by Heaphy of the Māori rangatira, Te Rauparaha

Heaphy's contract with the New Zealand Company was for three years and his primary role was to produce a visual record of its efforts that could be used as advertising. In doing so he travelled extensively around New Zealand and occasionally participated in overland treks, living out of a tent or staying with local Māori. He also sailed along the coastline aboard the Tory and learned surveying from its captain. Another employee of the company travelling on the Tory was Ernst Dieffenbach, who taught Heaphy basic geology.

Heaphy painted a variety of subjects including landscapes, flora and fauna and Māori people, including Te Rauparaha, the notable rangatira (chief). The success of the company depended on attracting emigrants to New Zealand so his work was almost always intended to present the land and its inhabitants in its best light. Heaphy was at times exposed to some danger; on an expedition to the Chatham Islands, his party intervened in a skirmish between two warring tribes and he was wounded in the leg. It is unlikely it was a serious wound, for a few weeks later he went on a trek back in New Zealand to the Taranaki Region, where he produced some of his more notable landscapes, including an exaggerated view of Mount Taranaki from the south.

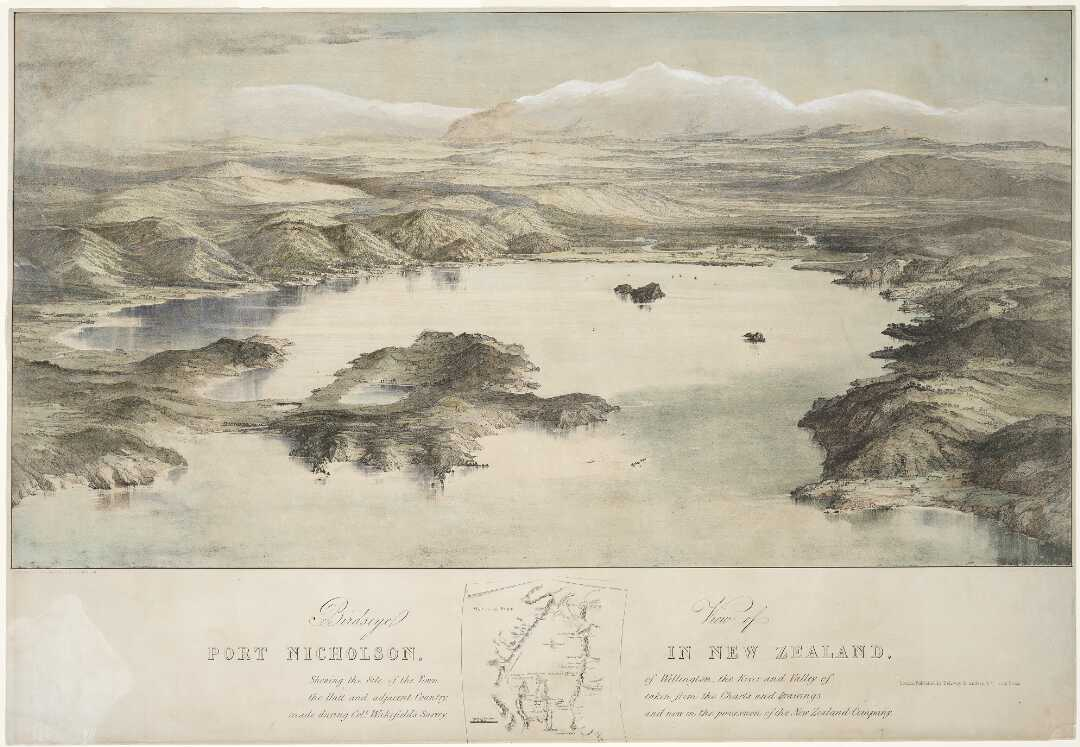
Birdseye view of Port Nicholson, the original name for Wellington; a lithograph by Thomas Allom based on information provided by Heaphy

From October 1840, Heaphy was based in Wellington. With a friend, he built a small cottage and from there executed several views of Wellington Harbour, which were much used in advertising for the New Zealand Company. Two examples of his work, views of the fledgling Wellington settlement, were reproduced as lithographs for distribution in England. As an example of how Heaphy manipulated his work for commercial appeal, one of these views depicted several ships anchored in the harbour and deliberately overstated their number, to give an impression of a busy port. A few months later, in early 1841, he joined Arthur Wakefield on the expedition that led to the founding of Nelson, in the South Island. Heaphy was among several employees of the New Zealand Company to scout the area around what is now known as Tasman Bay, before the location for Nelson was decided upon. He executed several watercolours highlighting the quality of the land intended for settlement and these were forwarded to London.

The New Zealand Company regularly published Heaphy's work as lithographs, often having extra details added when being redrawn for printing purposes. By late 1841, his services as an artist were no longer required, given the number of works that he had produced, and Wakefield decided to send him to London to make a report to the company directors. He took six months to reach London, by which time his three-year contract had expired. The directors were impressed with his report and it was published as a book entitled Narrative of a Residence in Various Parts of New Zealand and included several lithographs prepared from Heaphy's art. Another of the Wakefield brothers, Edward Jerningham, also published a book illustrated by Heaphy; this was entitled Adventures in New Zealand.

== Life in Nelson ==
Although no longer employed by the New Zealand Company, Heaphy, emboldened by the success of his report and the public reception to his paintings, sought further opportunities for similar work. From London, he wrote to the company secretary seeking support to explore the area inland of Nelson. The response was unenthusiastic; the company was concentrating on developing its settlements rather than undertaking in further exploration. Despite this, Heaphy returned to New Zealand and arrived in Nelson on 22 December 1842.

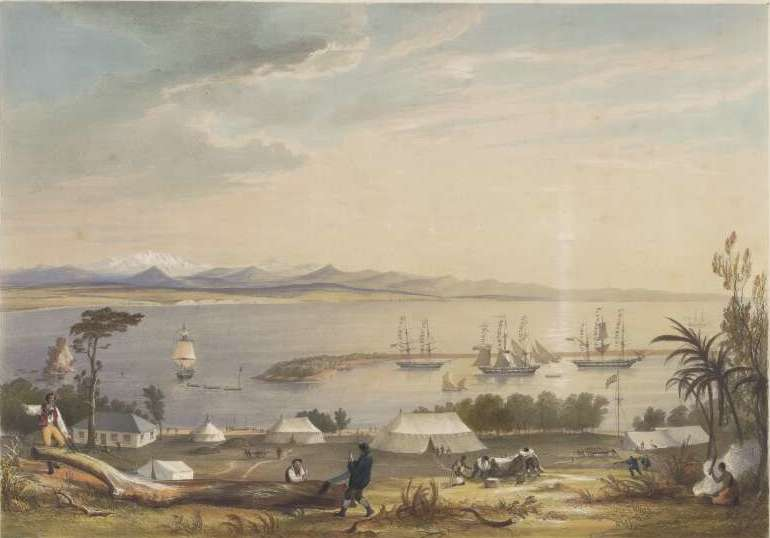
A colour lithograph of the area on which the town of Nelson was founded, based on a painting by Heaphy

There was little in way of work opportunities for Heaphy in Nelson and he based himself in Motueka. Here he farmed land with a friend, Frederick Moore, and this took much of what little funds he had. His farming venture was hard work and not particularly successful. By late 1843, the New Zealand Company was in need of good pastoral land around Nelson. It had clashed with Māori in the Wairau Affray in the Wairau Valley to the south-east of Nelson, and several company employees, including Arthur Wakefield, another brother of Edward Wakefield, were killed. The company needed to scout the area to the south-west and Heaphy finally got the chance to explore.

Wakefield's replacement as resident agent in Nelson for the New Zealand Company, William Fox, was a keen advocate of expansion for settlement in the area around Nelson. Fox authorised Heaphy and a surveyor to scout south-west to the Buller River in November 1843. In a subsequent expedition undertaken the following month, Heaphy and two Māori trekked to what is now known as Golden Bay, and returned to Motueka via the coast, a journey which he regarded as the most difficult he had undertaken at the time. Both expeditions failed to locate suitable land for settlement as did an expedition back to the Buller River in March 1845. Heaphy was reasonably well compensated for his exploration efforts and for additional funds, he undertook art commissions for Nelson's more wealthy residents.

In February 1846, Heaphy, accompanied by Fox and Thomas Brunner, another employee of the New Zealand Company, as well as a Ngāti Tūmatakōkiri tohunga named Kehu, undertook another expedition to the south-west. Difficult terrain faced them; high mountain ranges topped with snow and ice, steep bush, numerous rivers and gorges. Food sources included roots and berries; birds were snared and eels caught from streams. Along the coast, shellfish and gull eggs were added to the diet. The party, each carrying a load of 34 kilograms (75 lb), trekked to the Buller River and walked its banks as far as the Maruia River. As they believed they were only 32 kilometres (20 mi) from the coast, their dwindling provisions prevented them proceeding to the mouth of the Buller River. Guided by Kehu, the party traversed the Hope Saddle on their way back to Nelson, which they reached on 1 March.

Heaphy and Brunner were keen for further exploration and with Kehu, left Nelson on 17 March 1846, to scout along the West Coast to the mouth of the Buller. The expedition traced the western coast of South Island as far south as the Arahura River. Their journey began from Golden Bay and they made their way to West Wanganui where Etau, a local Māori, was hired as a porter. The local chief barred their journey south but Heaphy and Brunner mollified him with some tobacco. They continued along the coast, climbing steep cliffs and fording rivers as they went. Their movements were held up at times due to rain and high tides. At night, they sheltered in small caves, augmented with a screen of nīkau palm leaves. They crossed the Karamea River on 20 April and reached the Buller River ten days later. This had to be crossed using an old canoe that was repaired by Kehu and Etau and after crossing, they stayed at the local pā (village). In early May, they sighted the Southern Alps and at the Arahura River, the southernmost point of the expedition, they were hosted by the local Ngāi Tahu tribe at Taramakau Pā. Poor weather plagued their return along the coast but they reached Nelson on 18 August. The harsh conditions he had experienced during his travels left him disillusioned with the potential prospects for settlements along the West Coast region.

Life in Nelson remained difficult for Heaphy, who had by now lost his appetite for exploration. He eked out a living taking occasional jobs for the next six months. For much of 1847, he undertook survey work around Tasman Bay and later that year was a representative for the New Zealand Company, when the government investigated the amount of land set aside by the company for the local Māori. Work had dried up by early 1848 and when he was offered employment with the Auckland Survey Office in April 1848, he accepted.

== Life in Auckland ==
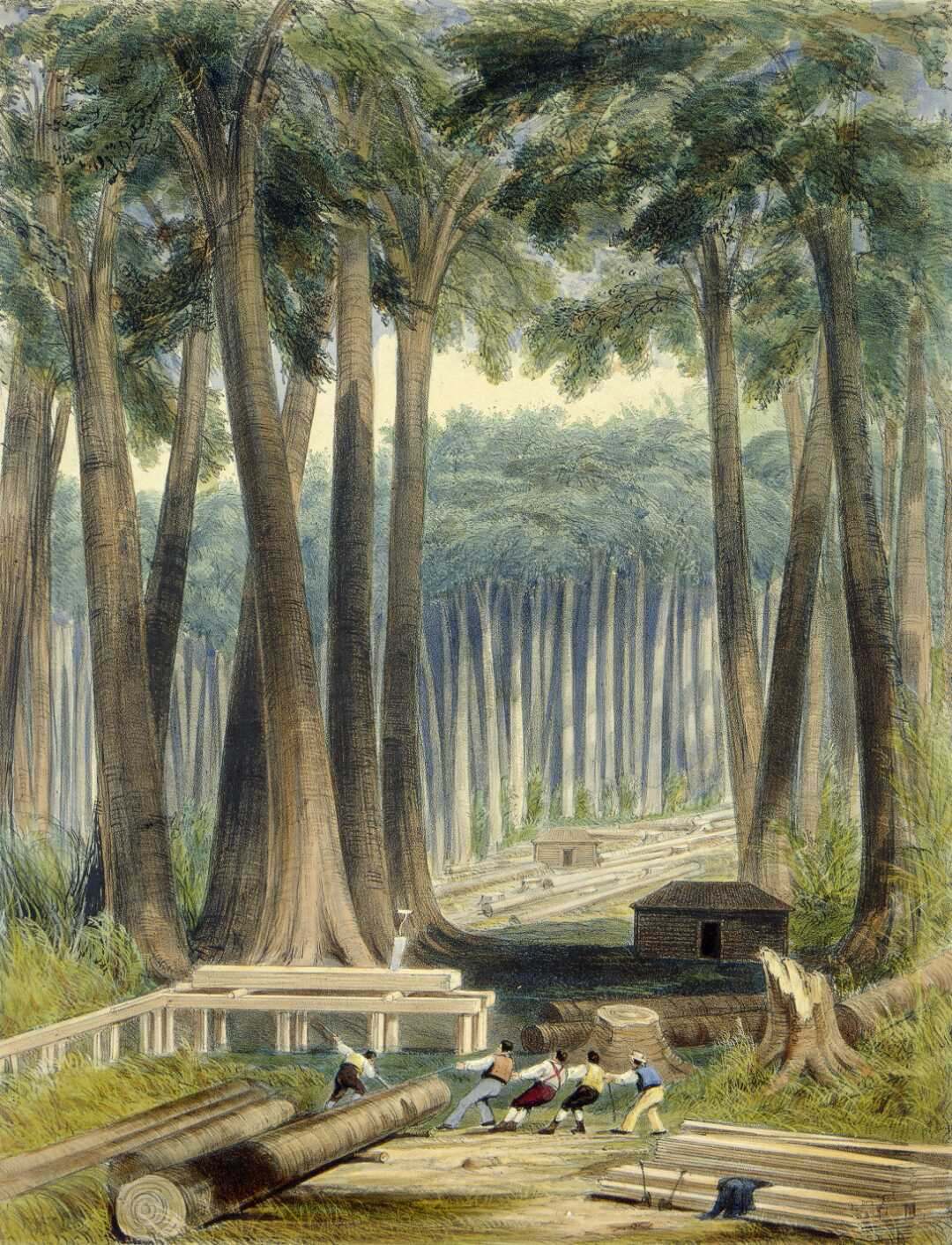
A colour lithograph reproduced from Heaphy's painting of a group of loggers clearing a tree in a forest of kauri

Moving north to Auckland, Heaphy's new role as the chief draughtsman for the Auckland Survey Office kept him occupied with the preparation of maps and plans. After a few years, he began to spend a greater amount of time in the field, where he carried out survey work. As he had done when living in Nelson, he supplemented his income with commissioned artworks. He also began to build on his geological knowledge, taking a particular interest in volcanology. He wrote an article on Auckland's volcanoes for a geological journal in England and completed several paintings of volcanoes as well as thermal attractions in the Bay of Plenty, including the famous Pink and White Terraces. Hoping to raise his profile, he sent many of his works to London and some remain on display at the offices of the Geological Society.

When he was 30, Heaphy met and began courting Kate Churton, the 21-year-old daughter of a reverend. The couple were married on 30 October 1851, at St Paul's Church in Auckland. A year later, he was appointed "Commissioner of Gold Fields" at Coromandel, following the recent discovery of gold. His role required him to supervise claims made by miners and negotiate land sales with local Māori. The gold rush in Coromandel soon petered out and he returned to his work at the Auckland Survey Office by mid-1853.

In November 1853, Sir George Grey ended his first term as Governor of New Zealand and sailed to the islands around New Caledonia, to indulge his interest in languages. He also wanted to investigate French claims on the islands. Heaphy accompanied him as his private secretary and took the opportunity to execute artworks of the islands he visited and their inhabitants. He gave some of his works to Grey, who took them back to England in December 1853 and donated them to the British Museum.

Heaphy and his wife moved north of Auckland to what is now known as Warkworth in early 1854, following his appointment as district surveyor for the Mahurangi Peninsula, which was being opened for settlement. For two years, Heaphy surveyed the plots of land that were to be sold to people moving to the area. In 1856 he became Auckland's provincial surveyor following the retirement of his predecessor. He moved back to Auckland and took up residence in Parnell. Surveying kept him busy for the next few years but in early 1859, he accompanied Ferdinand von Hochstetter on an expedition south of Auckland; Hochstetter had been invited by the government to make a report on a recent coalfield discovery in the area. The two became friendly and Hochstetter was impressed with Heaphy's bush skills, although privately did not accord him much respect for his scientific knowledge. When Hochstetter left for Europe later in the year, he took with him many examples of Heaphy's artwork. The two later fell out, when Heaphy had an article published in a geological journal. Hochstetter felt usurped by someone he considered an inferior scholar and publicly questioned Heaphy's credentials. He also made allegations that Heaphy had plagiarised portions of his work on the coalfield. Heaphy mounted a spirited defence and generally had the sympathy of the public. The dispute did not stop Hochstetter from using Heaphy's artwork in a book he published on New Zealand's geology.

== Military career ==
Soon after returning to Auckland in 1856, Heaphy joined a militia unit, the Auckland Rifle Volunteers, with the rank of private. In early 1863, during a period of hostilities of the New Zealand Wars, his unit was mobilised and Heaphy commissioned as an officer. Later that year he was appointed captain of the Parnell Company. In July 1863, as part of the invasion of the Waikato, he was sent to survey the military road being constructed into the Waikato. He also charted the riverways while pilot of the gunboat Pioneer. He was present at the Battle of Rangiriri and later made a sketch of the action, which unusually for him, included representations of British casualties. As the British advanced deeper into the Waikato, he was attached to the staff of Lieutenant Colonel Henry Havelock.

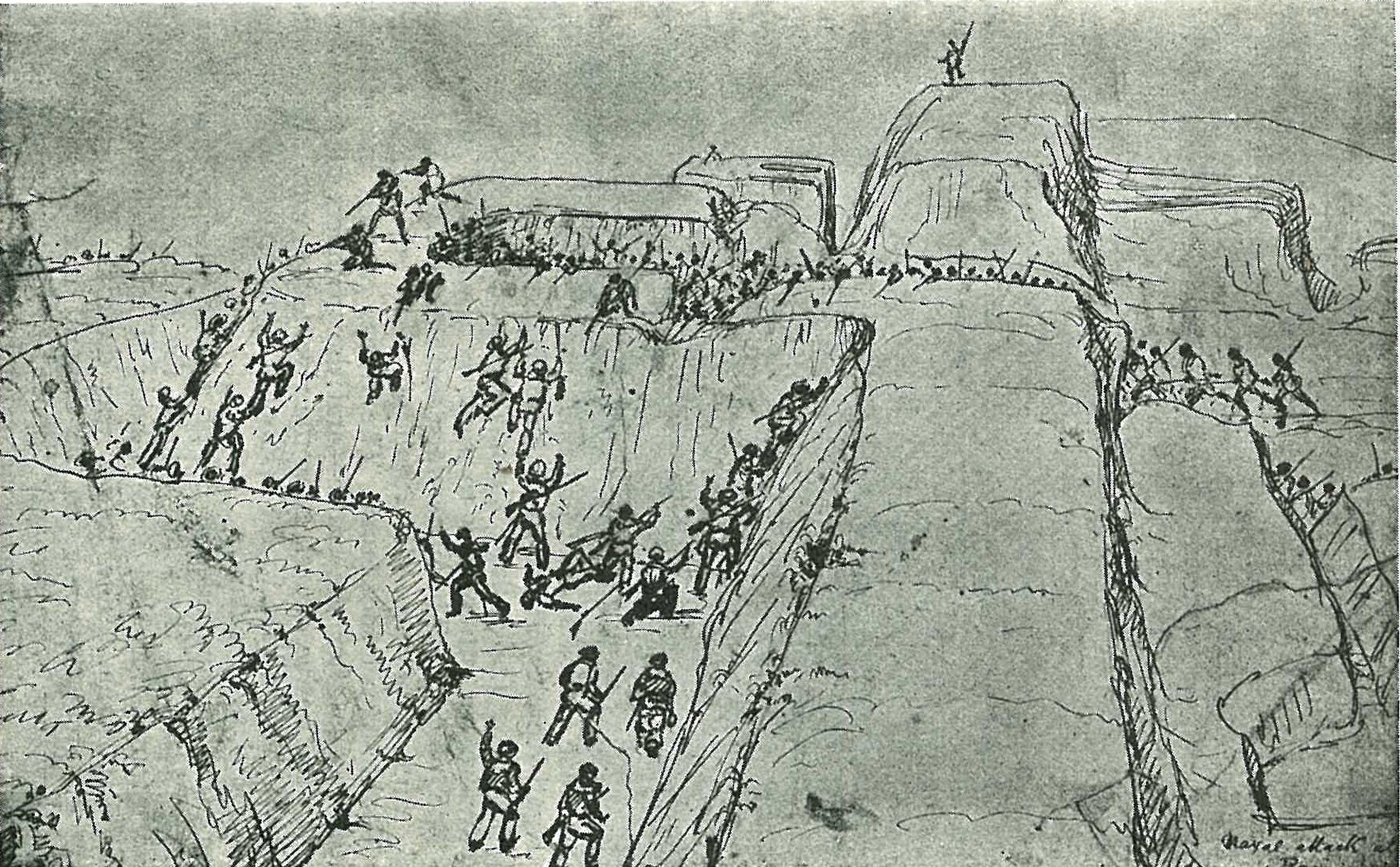
Naval attack at Rangiriri, 1863, a pen sketch by Heaphy

The Waikato Māori had withdrawn to fortified positions at Pikopiko and Paterangi by early 1864. While their positions were under siege, war parties would mount raids on small groups of British soldiers. On 11 February, soldiers of the 40th Regiment of Foot were swimming in the Mangapiko Stream near Paterangi and were attacked by a raiding party. Men of the 50th Regiment of Foot came to the aid of the defenders. Among them was Heaphy, who was in command of a group of 12 soldiers and came across the Māori reserve. After putting them to flight, he then led his men to the Mangapiko Stream to assist the British soldiers helping the besieged party. Despite being outnumbered, the British repulsed the Māori and began to pursue them into the bush. A soldier was wounded and Heaphy and three others went to his aid. In doing so, Heaphy and one of the other soldiers were wounded while another was killed. Unable to extricate themselves, Heaphy and the remaining fit soldier provided cover to prevent the wounded men from being killed by the Māori. They were eventually relieved by reinforcements, but the two wounded men that Heaphy and the soldier were trying to protect died of their injuries. Despite wounds to his arm, hip and ribs, Heaphy remained in the field for much of the remainder of the day, until the ambushed party was relieved. Following the action at Mangapiko Stream, Heaphy was promoted to major; a month later, with the end of the war in the Waikato, he ceased active duty and returned to civilian life.

=== Victoria Cross ===
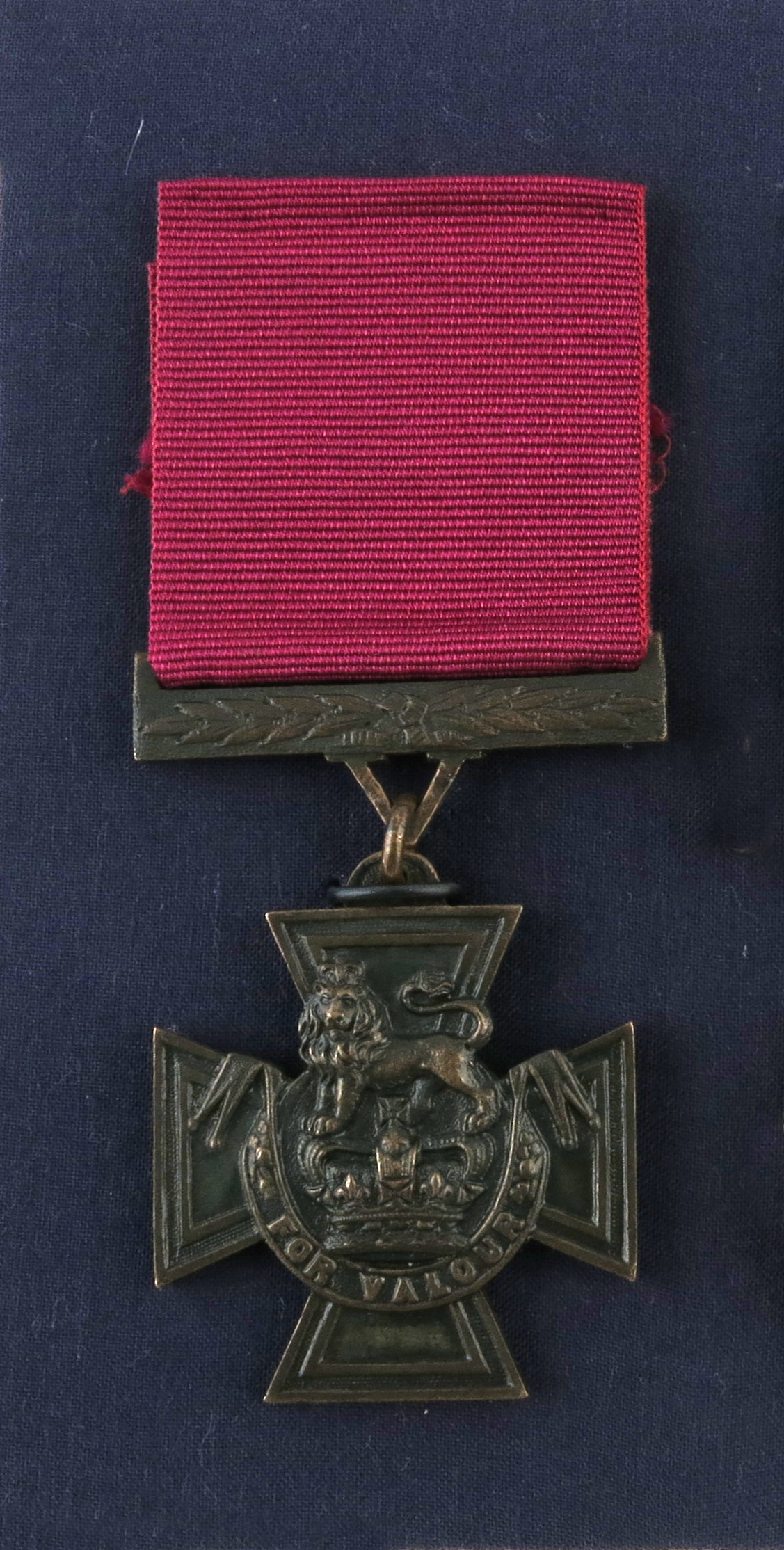
Heaphy's VC, which is displayed at the Auckland War Memorial Museum

In late 1864, Major General Thomas Galloway, the commander of the New Zealand colonial forces, recommended Heaphy for the Victoria Cross (VC) for his actions at Mangapiko Stream. Instituted in 1856, the VC is the highest gallantry award that can be bestowed on a soldier of the British Empire.

The recommendation was supported by Grey, who was serving a second term as the Governor of New Zealand, despite knowing that neither Heaphy or another man also recommended for the VC for an action earlier in the campaign, were in the British Army or Royal Navy. At the time, only personnel from the regular British military could be awarded the VC and thus Heaphy, as a militiaman, was not eligible. Grey argued that as Heaphy was under the effective command of British officers he should be made an exception. In London, the authorities disagreed and the recommendation was turned down. Heaphy refused to accept this and began to agitate with the British government, with support from Grey, Havelock, and General Duncan Cameron, commander of the British forces in New Zealand. He was eventually successful and on 8 February 1867, Queen Victoria made a declaration that the local forces of New Zealand would be eligible for the VC. That day, the award of a VC to Heaphy, the first to a New Zealander and also to a non-regular soldier, was gazetted. The citation read:

For his gallant conduct at the skirmish on the banks of the Mangapiko River, in New Zealand, on the 11th of February, 1864, in assisting a wounded soldier of the 40th Regiment, who had fallen into a hollow among the thickest of the concealed Maories. Whilst doing so, he became the target for a volley at a few feet distant. Five balls pierced his clothes and cap, and he was wounded in three places. Although hurt, he continued to aid the wounded until the end of the day. Major Heaphy was at the time in charge of a party of soldiers of the 40th and 50th Regiments, under the orders of Lieutenant-Colonel Sir Henry Marshman Havelock, Bart., V.C., G.C.B, D.L. the Senior Officer on the spot, who had moved rapidly down to the place where the troops were hotly engaged and pressed.

— The London Gazette, 8 February 1867

Heaphy was presented with his VC at a parade at Albert Barracks in Auckland on 11 May 1867. The medal is now on display at the Auckland War Memorial Museum.

== Later life ==
After the cessation of hostilities, Heaphy was contracted as the "Chief Surveyor to the General Government of New Zealand" and surveyed much of the land seized from the Waikato Māori by the British, which included that on which the towns of Hamilton and Cambridge were established. In Hamilton, Heaphy Terrace, a thoroughfare in the suburb of Claudelands, is named after him. His contract ended in early 1866 and he was reinstated to his pre-war position as Auckland's provincial surveyor.

New Zealand Parliament
Years	Term	Electorate	Party
1867–1870	4th	Parnell	Independent

In April 1867, Frederick Whitaker resigned his posts as Superintendent of the Auckland Province and Member of Parliament for the Parnell electorate in Auckland. Whitaker's resignation became known soon after Heaphy's award of the VC was announced and Heaphy declared his candidacy for the vacant seat, declaring that he would be an independent representative for Parnell. The publicity around his award of the VC helped raise his profile and when the nomination meeting for the 1867 by-election was held at the Parnell Hall on 6 June, he was returned unopposed as the electorate's representative in the New Zealand Parliament. Heaphy's time in parliament was undistinguished but he was a hard working representative for the people of the Parnell electorate. He met with constituents to discuss matters of concern ranging from taxes to publicly funded travel. A parliamentary colleague was Fox, his old acquaintance from Nelson. When Fox became Premier of New Zealand in June 1869, Heaphy was a supporter. Offered a well paid position as "Commissioner of Native Reserves" by the Fox administration, he resigned from parliament on 13 April 1870.

As commissioner, Heaphy's role was to administer Māori land set aside by the government and to determine areas of land that could be opened to migrants. His work took him up and down the country, inspecting land and negotiating with Māori landowners, a process he did not always enjoy, particularly when rival tribes disputed ownership. He also had to arrange for the acquisition of Māori land for utilities, such as telegraph lines. He occasionally advocated for compensation for aggrieved Māori, whose land had been stolen by colonials. An added stress in Heaphy's first year as commissioner was an enquiry into his conduct during the period he was "Chief Surveyor to the General Government of New Zealand" and working in the Waikato. Allegations had been raised that he took bribes to illegally adjust land boundaries. The enquiry, headed by an acquaintance from his days in Nelson, Alfred Domett, cleared Heaphy of corruption, although he was criticised for taking payments from young trainee surveyors in return for work. In 1872, he and his wife moved to Wellington, which was more centrally located and thus convenient for his work, which now included an appointment as "Trust Commissioner for the Wellington District", dealing with land fraud.

By 1875, Heaphy, beginning to suffer from rheumatism, had reduced the amount of time he spent in the field determining ownership of Māori land and its availability for colonial settlement and the work ended altogether in 1880. In the interim, he picked up more civil service duties; he became a justice of the peace and presided over cases of petty crime brought to the Resident Magistrates Court in Wellington. In April 1878 he was appointed "Government Insurance Commissioner" and later that year became a judge of the Native Land Court.

== Death and legacy ==
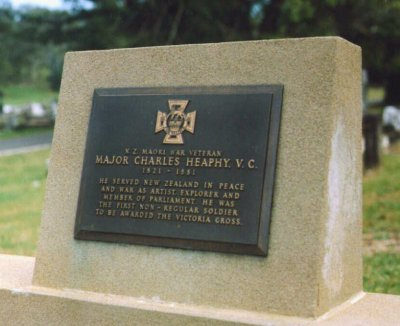
Heaphy's headstone at Toowong Cemetery, Brisbane

By May 1881, Heaphy's health was in severe decline and, still affected by his rheumatism, he caught tuberculosis. He resigned from all his civil service positions the following month and with his wife, moved to Brisbane, in Queensland, Australia. The couple hoped the warmer climate would help with Heaphy's health but he died on 3 August 1881. Having no children he was survived only by his wife. Buried at Toowong Cemetery, formerly the Brisbane General Cemetery, his grave was at first marked with a numbered plaque and soon became overgrown. A descendant of his wife discovered the burial site in 1960 and a headstone was erected by the New Zealand government. The inscription reads: He served New Zealand in peace and war as artist, explorer and member of parliament. He was the first non-regular soldier to be awarded the Victoria Cross.

In addition to being the first New Zealander to be awarded the VC, Heaphy was an accomplished artist. His watercolours, mostly produced between 1841 and 1855, are an important record of many scenes in the early days of European settlement in New Zealand. The best of these were those produced for the New Zealand Company. Much of his later work was in the form of sketches and his output decreased in his middle age. Other than the publications relating to the New Zealand Company, his work received little exposure during his lifetime. His paintings were only exhibited on a few occasions, the first in February 1866 in Auckland.

The New Zealand Centennial Exhibition in 1940 increased the public awareness of Heaphy's art as a record of colonial life in New Zealand. The Alexander Turnbull Library had purchased an archive of New Zealand Company paintings in 1915 from a bookseller in London, which included around 30 of Heaphy's paintings. These were shown during the centennial exhibition and from there his reputation as a significant artist of colonial New Zealand grew. In his book Letters and Art in New Zealand, published in 1940, the art critic Eric Hall McCormick considered him the finest New Zealand artist of the colonial period, a view also shared by later authors. Prints of Heaphy's paintings began to be produced in 1953 and on the hundred year anniversary of his death, a limited edition portfolio of his watercolours was published. At the time, it was the most expensive book produced in New Zealand, retailing for NZ$750.

His name is also known through the Heaphy Track, a walking route in the north-west corner of the South Island. He and Brunner were probably the first Europeans to walk through this area of the South Island and the Heaphy Track, though he never followed its path, is named in his honour as is the Heaphy River.

== Sources ==
- Baker, Matiu; Cooper, Catherine Elizabeth; Fitzgerald, Michael; Rice, Rebecca (2024). Te Ata o Tū: The Shadow of Tūmatauenga: The New Zealand Wars Collections of Te Papa. Wellington: Te Papa Press. ISBN 978-0-9941460-8-3.
- Docking, Gil (1982). Two Hundred Years of New Zealand Painting. Wellington: A. H. & A. W. Reed. ISBN 0-589-01452-8.
- Harper, Glyn; Richardson, Colin (2007). In the Face of the Enemy: The Complete History of the Victoria Cross and New Zealand. Auckland: HarperCollins Publishers. ISBN 978-1-86950-650-6.
- Host, Emily (2006). Thomas Brunner: His Life and Great Journeys. Nelson: Nikau Press. ISBN 0-9582242-6-9.
- Pascoe, John (1983). Explorers & Travellers: Early Expeditions in New Zealand. Wellington: A. H. & A. W. Reed. ISBN 0-589-01443-9.
- Reed, A. W. (1952). The Story of New Zealand Place Names. Wellington: A.H. & A.W. Reed. OCLC 59066325.
- Sharp, Iain (2008). Heaphy. Auckland: Auckland University Press. ISBN 978-1-86940-421-5.
- Wilson, Jim (1985) [First published in 1913]. New Zealand Parliamentary Record, 1840–1984 (4th ed.). Wellington: V.R. Ward, Govt. Printer. OCLC 154283103.

New Zealand Parliament
Preceded by Frederick Whitaker	Member of Parliament for Parnell; 1867–70	Succeeded by Reader Wood
