= 16th New Zealand Parliament =

Term of the Parliament of New Zealand

16th Parliament of New Zealand
←	15th Parliament	17th Parliament	→
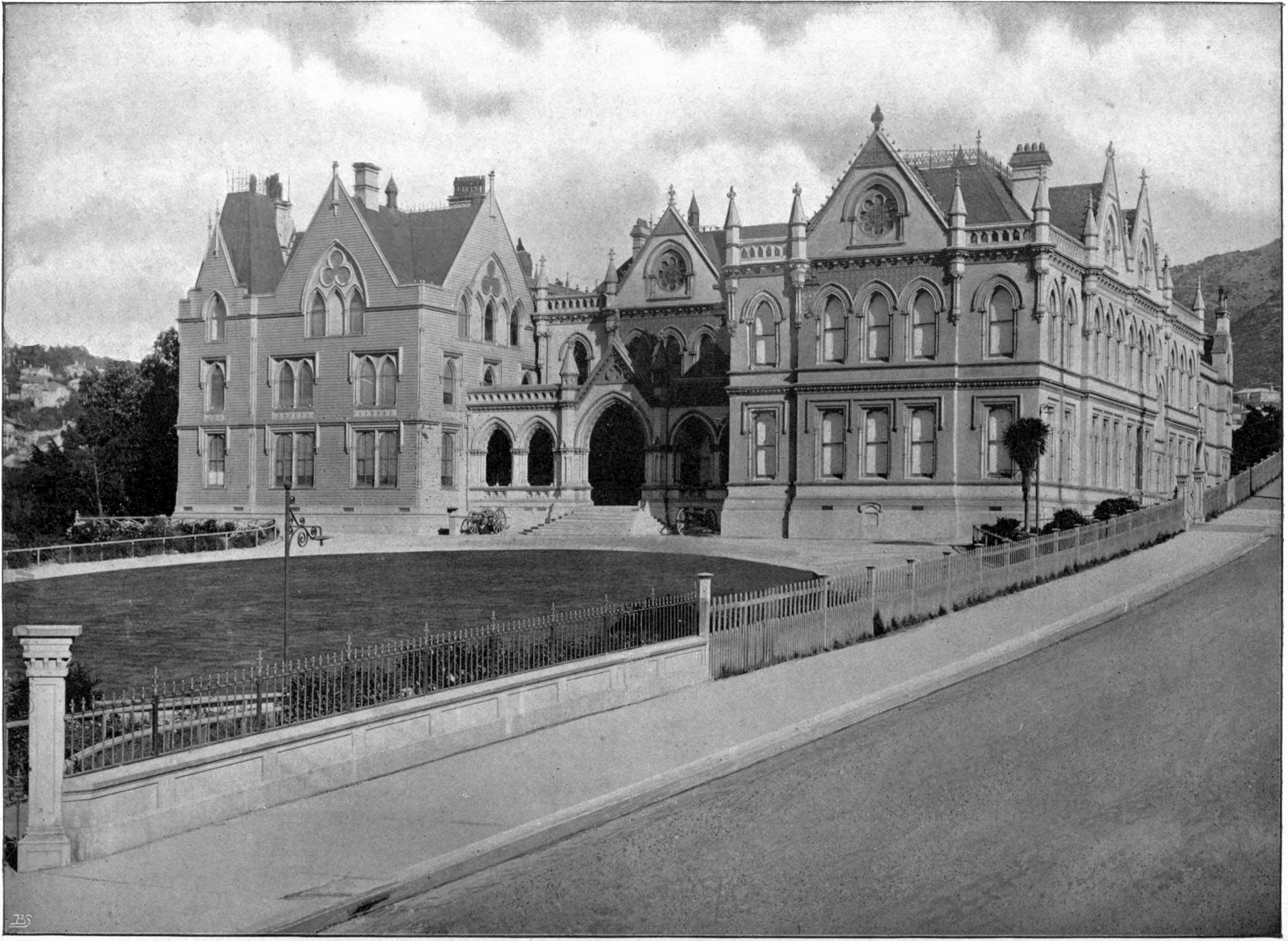

Overview
- Legislative body: New Zealand Parliament
- Term: 27 June 1906 – 10 October 1908
- Election: 1905 New Zealand general election
- Government: Liberal Government

House of Representatives
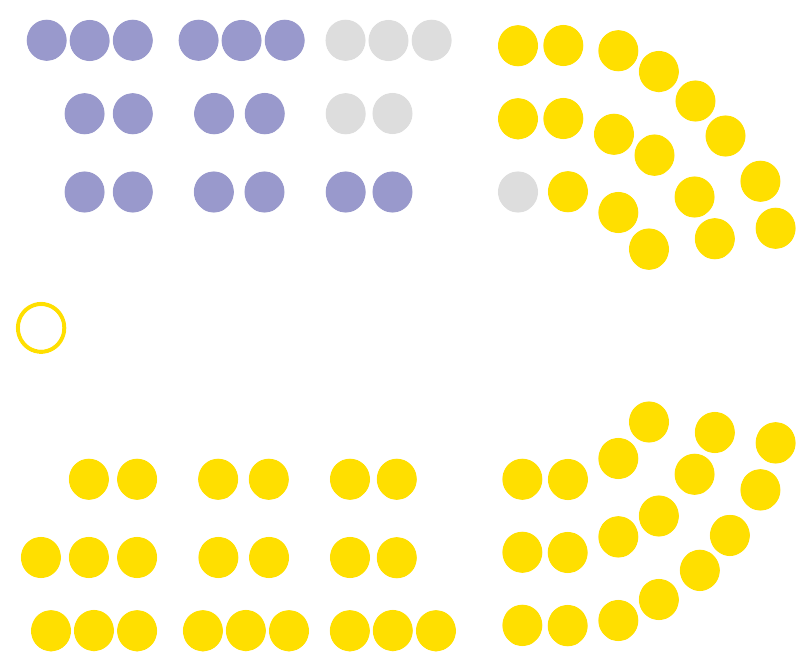
- Members: 80
- Speaker of the House: Arthur Guinness
- Prime Minister: Joseph Ward; William Hall-Jones until 6 August 1906 as Premier
- Leader of the Opposition: William Massey

Legislative Council
- Members: 44
- Speaker of the Council: Charles Bowen

Sovereign
- Monarch: HM Edward VII
- Governor: HE Rt. Hon. The Lord Plunket

The 16th New Zealand Parliament was a term of the New Zealand Parliament. It was elected at the 1905 general election in December of that year.

== Changes to the electoral law ==
The 1903 City Single Electorates Act declared that at the dissolution of the 15th Parliament, the four multi-member electorates would be abolished and replaced each with three single-member electorates. It was also the year absentee voting was introduced for all electors unable to be in their own electorate on election day. The first Chief Electoral Officer was appointed.

Accordingly, the multi-member urban electorates of City of Auckland, City of Christchurch, City of Dunedin and City of Wellington were abolished and replaced with the following single-member seats:

- Auckland Central
- Auckland East
- Auckland West
- Christchurch East
- Christchurch North
- Christchurch South
- Wellington Central
- Wellington East
- Wellington North
- Dunedin Central
- Dunedin North
- Dunedin South

Nine of these twelve electorates had existed before. Wellington Central, Wellington North, and Dunedin North were established for the first time.

== 1905 general election ==
The 1905 general election was held on Wednesday, 6 December in the general electorates and on Wednesday, 20 December in the Māori electorates, respectively. A total of 80 MPs were elected; 38 represented North Island electorates, 38 represented South Island electorates, and the remaining four represented Māori electorates. 476,473 voters were enrolled and the official turnout at the election was 83.3%.

== Sessions ==
The 16th Parliament sat for four sessions (there were two sessions in 1906), and was prorogued on 29 October 1908.

Session	Opened	Adjourned
first	27 June 1906	29 June 1906
second	21 August 1906	29 October 1906
third	27 June 1907	25 November 1907
fourth	29 June 1908	10 October 1908

== Ministries ==
The Liberal Government of New Zealand had taken office on 24 January 1891. The Seddon Ministry under Richard Seddon had taken office in 1893 during the term of the 11th Parliament. The Seddon Ministry remained in power for the whole term of this Parliament and held power until Seddon's death on 10 June 1906. Seddon was travelling overseas at the time of his death, and William Hall-Jones was a reluctant acting Premier at the time. Joseph Ward would normally have been acting premier, but he was also overseas. So upon Seddon's death, Hall-Jones was sworn in as Prime Minister (the first time this new title was used) and formed the Hall-Jones Ministry on 21 June 1906. Upon Ward's return from overseas, the leadership was offered to him, which he accepted. Hall-Jones resigned as prime minister, succeeded by Ward who formed the Ward Ministry on 6 August 1906. The Ward Ministry remained in power for the remainder of the parliamentary term and subsequently until Ward's resignation as prime minister in 1912.

== Party composition ==
=== Start of term ===
Party	Seats
Liberal	58
Conservative	16
Independent	6

== Initial composition of the 16th Parliament ==
The following are the results of the 1905 general election:

Key

Liberal Conservative New Liberal Liberal–Labour Independent Liberal Independent

Electorate results for the 1905 New Zealand general election
Electorate	Incumbent	Winner	Majority	Runner up
General electorates
Ashburton	John McLachlan		244	John Studholme
Auckland Central	New electorate	Alfred Kidd	939	Lemuel Bagnall
Auckland East	New electorate	Frederick Baume	871	Harry Bamford
Auckland West	New electorate	Charles Poole	340	James Parr
Avon	William Tanner		725	John Russell Brunt
Awarua	Joseph Ward		2,848	Henry Woodnorth
Bay of Islands	Robert Houston		470	John Charles Johnson
Bay of Plenty	William Herries		211	Joseph Foster
Bruce	James Allen		435	William Darcy Mason
Buller	James Colvin		2,798	Frank Isitt
Caversham	Thomas Sidey		1,760	William Earnshaw
Chalmers	Edmund Allen		1,437	William Pryor
Christchurch East	New electorate	Thomas Davey	565	Henry Featherston Toogood
Christchurch North	New electorate	Charles Gray	1,084	Tommy Taylor
Christchurch South	New electorate	Harry Ell	2,511	Charles Henry Winny
Clutha	James Thomson	Alexander Malcolm	272	Daniel Stewart
Courtenay	Charles Lewis		232	Thomas Jones McBride
Dunedin Central	New electorate	John A. Millar	1,919	Alexander Samuel Adam
Dunedin North	New electorate	Alfred Richard Barclay	514	Harry Bedford
Dunedin South	New electorate	James Arnold	780	William Downie Stewart
Eden	John Bollard		2,760	Robert French
Egmont	William Thomas Jennings		651	Charles Leech
Ellesmere	Heaton Rhodes		283	George Rennie
Franklin	William Massey		935	William Wilson McCardle
Geraldine	Frederick Flatman		1,233	William Jeffries
Grey	Arthur Guinness		377	Joseph Petrie
Grey Lynn	George Fowlds		230	John Farrell
Hawera	Charles E. Major		449	Felix McGuire
Hawke's Bay	William Russell	Alfred Dillon	1,043	William Russell
Hurunui	Andrew Rutherford		1,186	Obed Frederick Clothier
Hutt	Thomas Wilford		1,912	George Yerex
Invercargill	Josiah Hanan		1,721	Irvin Willis Raymond
Kaiapoi	David Buddo		45	Richard Moore
Kaipara	Alfred Harding	John Stallworthy	9	Alfred Harding
Lyttelton	George Laurenson		1,108	William Radcliffe
Manawatu	Job Vile	John Stevens	359	Job Vile
Manukau	Matthew Kirkbride		663	Ralph Duncan Stewart
Marsden	Francis Mander		348	Robert Thompson
Masterton	Alexander Hogg		859	James Christopher Cooper
Mataura	Robert McNab		435	Thomas MacGibbon
Motueka	Roderick McKenzie		2,733	Frank Isitt
Mount Ida	Alexander Herdman	John MacPherson	394	Alexander Herdman
Napier	Alfred Fraser		1,469	Montague W. P. Lascelles
Nelson	John Graham		29	Harry Atmore
Newtown	William Barber		1,213	Thomas William Hislop
Oamaru	Thomas Young Duncan		2,009	James Mitchell
Ohinemuri	Edward Moss	Hugh Poland	351	Edward Moss
Oroua	Frank Lethbridge		986	Owen Carlin Pleasants
Otaki	William Hughes Field		1,394	Byron Paul Brown
Pahiatua	Bill Hawkins	Robert Beatson Ross	206	Bill Hawkins
Palmerston	William Wood		480	Frederick Pirani
Parnell	Frank Lawry		122	Murdoch McLean
Patea	Walter Symes		143	John Hine
Rangitikei	Arthur Remington		1,710	Joe Reginald Sommerville
Riccarton	George Witty		1,240	Thomas Caverhill
Selwyn	Charles Hardy		322	Joseph Ivess
Taieri	Donald Reid		535	Alexander Marshall
Taranaki	Edward Smith		236	Henry Okey
Thames	James McGowan		1,229	Malcolm Fleming
Timaru	William Hall-Jones		1,063	Frank Rolleston
Tuapeka	James Bennet		977	Robert Gilkison
Waiapu	James Carroll		1,798	Lissant Clayton
Waikato	Frederic Lang	Henry Greenslade	78	Frederic Lang
Waikouaiti	Thomas Mackenzie		702	Edward Henry Clark
Waipawa	Charles Hall		1,254	George Hunter
Wairarapa	Walter Clarke Buchanan	J. T. Marryat Hornsby	531	Walter Clarke Buchanan
Wairau	Charles H. Mills		977	John Duncan
Waitaki	William Steward		1,643	George Dash
Waitemata	Ewen Alison		971	Cecil Clinkard
Wakatipu	William Fraser		423	Michael Gilfedder
Wallace	John Charles Thomson		461	Dugald Macpherson
Wanganui	Archibald Willis	James Thomas Hogan	924	Archibald Willis
Wellington Central	New electorate	Francis Fisher	445	Patrick O'Regan
Wellington East	New electorate	John Aitken	19	William McLean
Wellington North	New electorate	Charles Hayward Izard	660	John Duthie
Westland	Richard Seddon		3,180	Harry Cowin
Māori electorates
Eastern Maori	Wi Pere	Āpirana Ngata	757	Wi Pere
Northern Maori	Hone Heke		627	Ru Reweti
Southern Maori	Tame Parata		160	Hopere Uru
Western Maori	Henare Kaihau		1,688	Tureiti Te Heuheu Tukino V

== By-elections during 16th Parliament ==
There were a number of changes during the term of the 16th Parliament.

Electorate and by-election		Date	Incumbent	Cause	Winner
Westland	1906	13 July	Richard Seddon	Death	Tom Seddon
Manukau	1906	6 December	Matthew Kirkbride	Death	Frederic Lang
Taranaki	1907	4 May	Edward Smith	Death	Henry Okey
Tuapeka	1908	5 June	James Bennet	Death	William Chapple
