= Electoral history of Gordon Coates =

List of elections featuring Gordon Coates as a candidate

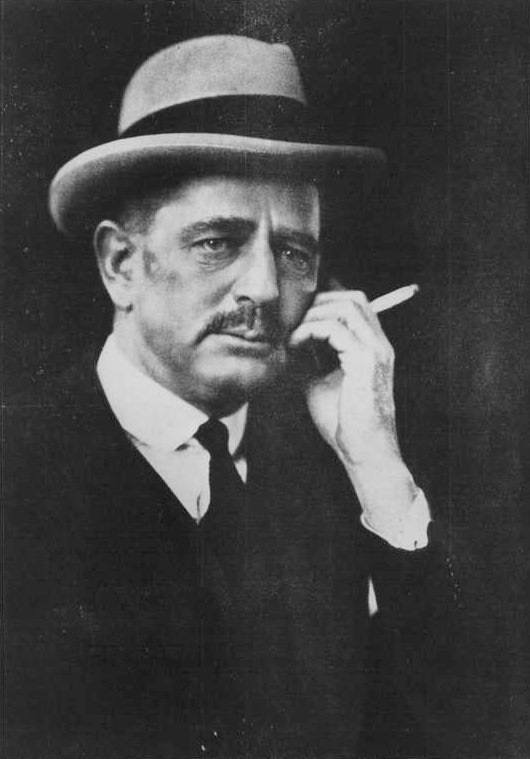
Gordon Coates in 1926.

This is a summary of the electoral history of Gordon Coates, Prime Minister of New Zealand (1925–28), Leader of the Reform Party (1925–36), Member of Parliament for Kaipara (1911–43).

== Parliamentary elections ==
=== 1911 election ===
1911 general election: Kaipara, First ballot
Party	Candidate	Votes	%	±%
Liberal	John Stallworthy	2,301	45.41	
Independent	Gordon Coates	1,843	36.37	
Reform	Edward Thurlow Field	848	16.73	
Informal votes		75	1.48	
Turnout		5,067	80.42	
Registered electors		6,300		

1911 general election: Kaipara, Second ballot
Party	Candidate	Votes	%	±%
Independent	Gordon Coates	2,744	55.69	+19.32
Liberal	John Stallworthy	2,172	44.08	−1.33
Informal votes		11	0.22	−1.26
Majority		572	11.60	
Turnout		4,927	78.20	−2.22

=== 1914 election ===
1914 general election: Kaipara
Party	Candidate	Votes	%	±%
Reform	Gordon Coates	3,596	59.21	+3.52
Liberal	Richard Hoe	2,478	40.79	
Informal votes		92	1.51	1.29
Majority		1,118	18.40	+6.80
Turnout		6,074	85.83	+7.63
Registered electors		7,076		

=== 1919 election ===
1919 general election: Kaipara
Party	Candidate	Votes	%	±%
Reform	Gordon Coates	4,214	78.98	+19.77
Labour	Alfred Gregory	923	17.30	
Informal votes		198	3.71	+2.20
Majority		3,291	61.68	+43.28
Turnout		5,335	77.64	−8.19
Registered electors		6,871		

=== 1922 election ===
1922 general election: Kaipara
Party	Candidate	Votes	%	±%
Reform	Gordon Coates	5,001	65.45	−13.53
Liberal	Robert Hornblow	2,537	33.20	
Informal votes		102	1.33	−2.38
Majority		2,464	32.25	−29.43
Turnout		7,640	88.88	+11.24
Registered electors		8,595		

=== 1925 election ===
1925 general election: Kaipara
Party	Candidate	Votes	%	±%
Reform	Gordon Coates	6,307	79.87	+14.42
Labour	Bill Barnard	1,472	18.64	
Informal votes		117	1.48	+0.15
Majority		4,835	61.23	+28.98
Turnout		7,896	89.82	+0.04
Registered electors		8,790		

=== 1928 election ===
1928 general election: Kaipara
Party	Candidate	Votes	%	±%
Reform	Gordon Coates	5,190	65.65	−14.22
Labour	Jim Barclay	2,715	34.35	
Informal votes		111	1.38	−0.10
Majority		2,475	31.31	−29.92
Turnout		8,016	87.85	−1.07
Registered electors		9,125		

=== 1931 election ===
1931 general election: Kaipara
Party	Candidate	Votes	%	±%
Reform	Gordon Coates	5,008	63.14	−2.52
Country Party	Albert Edward Robinson	2,924	36.86	
Majority		2,084	26.27	−5.04
Informal votes		23	0.29	−1.10
Turnout		7,955	84.47	−3.38
Registered electors		9,418		

=== 1935 election ===
1935 general election: Kaipara
Party	Candidate	Votes	%	±%
Reform	Gordon Coates	4,738	48.84	−14.30
Independent	William Grounds	4,436	45.72	
Democrat	John Caughley	528	5.44	
Informal votes		141	1.45	+1.06
Majority		302	3.11	−23.16
Turnout		9,702	89.68	+5.21
Registered electors		10,818		

=== 1938 election ===
1938 general election: Kaipara
Party	Candidate	Votes	%	±%
National	Gordon Coates	5,414	57.62	+8.78
Labour	Percy MacGregor Stewart	3,725	39.64	
Country Party	James Scott-Davidson	257	2.74	
Informal votes		65	0.69	−0.74
Majority		1,689	17.98	+14.87
Turnout		9,461	92.85	+3.17
Registered electors		10,190		
