= William Chapple (New Zealand politician) =

New Zealand politician (1864–1936)

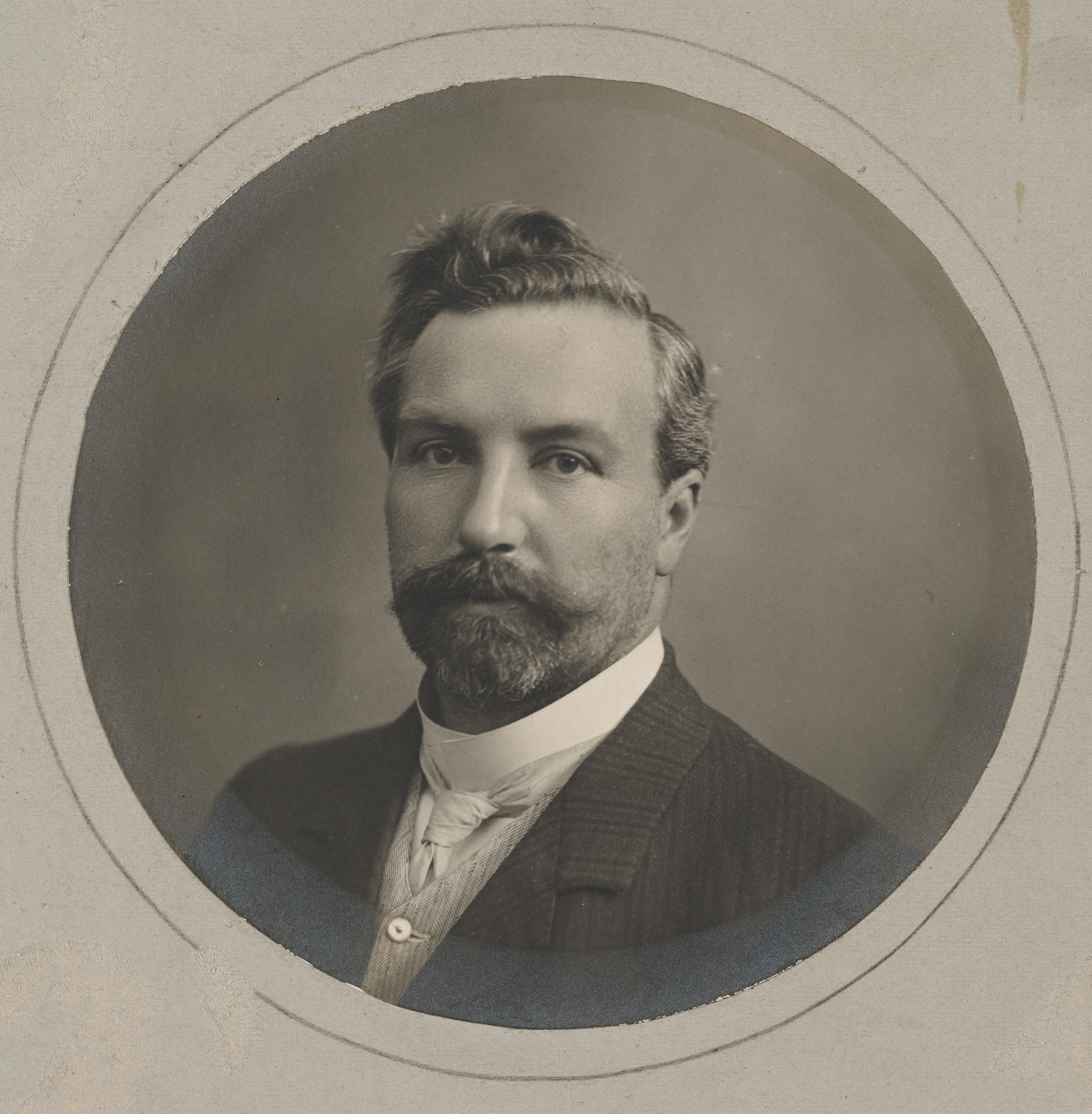
- William Chapple in 1908

Member of the New Zealand Parliament for Tuapeka
- In office 5 June 1908 – 29 October 1908
- Preceded by: James Bennet
- Succeeded by: Robert Scott

Personal details
- Born: 14 July 1864 Alexandra, New Zealand
- Died: 19 October 1936 (aged 72) Paddington, England
- Spouse: Sarah Douglas Chapple

William Allan Chapple (14 July 1864 – 19 October 1936) was a member of both the New Zealand House of Representatives and the House of Commons of the United Kingdom.

== Early life ==
Chapple was born in Alexandra in Central Otago, New Zealand. His parents were the farmer John Cole Chapple and Elizabeth McEwan Chapple (née Allan). He received his early education at Alexandra Primary School. He commenced a medical degree at Otago University and in 1888 went to King's College Hospital for one year. He returned to Otago in the following year to complete his degree, and graduated in 1890 with MB ChB. He was first registered as a medical professional on 10 May 1890 and went to Motueka, where he became Public Vaccinator and Native Medical Attendant for the Nelson district. He became a member of the Royal College of Surgeons in 1897, became MRCP&S in Ireland in 1897 and obtained further qualifications in Dublin (Dip State Med, DPH). He obtained his Doctor of Medicine (MD) from Otago University in 1899.

Chapple married Sarah Douglas Turnbull on 1 January 1891 at St Johns Presbyterian Church in Willis Street, Wellington. His wife, five years younger than him, was born in San Francisco. Her father was the Wellington architect Thomas Turnbull. At the time, Chapple was still living in Motueka, but later that year, his father-in-law designed him a large house to be built on the corner of Willis and Dixon Streets in Wellington. He moved to Wellington in 1892, where he continued to practice medicine. He was interested in issues of education and was a philanthropist. He was the president of the Wellington Swimming Club. He served on the Victoria College Council (these days the Victoria University of Wellington) until 1907.

== Member of Parliament ==
New Zealand Parliament
Years	Term	Electorate	Party
1908	16th	Tuapeka	Independent Liberal

Chapple was associated with the New Zealand Liberal Party. He unsuccessfully stood as an independent Liberal against William Henry Peter Barber in the Newtown electorate in the 1902 and 1905 general elections.

William Chapple represented the Tuapeka electorate in the New Zealand House of Representatives from June to October 1908 after a by-election, but was defeated in the 1908 general election by Robert Scott.

Later, Chapple was a Liberal Party Member of Parliament (MP) in the House of Commons at Westminster. He represented Stirlingshire from January 1910 until the constituency was abolished at the 1918 general election. On the reorganisation of constituencies in 1918, he was unsuccessful in Clackmannan and Eastern Stirlingshire, but returned at the 1922 general election as MP for Dumfriesshire, holding that seat until his defeat at the 1924 general election.

== Later life ==
Chapple strongly advocated eugenics. He was the author of Fertility of the Unfit, in which he advocated enforced sterilisation in certain cases. He also published How to Impress the Evils of Alcohol, First Principles in the Art of Physical Development and Cases and Comments from a Doctor's Practice.

In 1912, Chapple made large investments in property in the Canadian city of Vancouver.

Chapple died on 19 October 1936 in Paddington, London.

New Zealand Parliament
Preceded by James Bennet	Member of Parliament for Tuapeka; 1908	Succeeded by Robert Scott
Parliament of the United Kingdom
Preceded by Donald Mackenzie Smeaton	Member of Parliament for Stirlingshire; January 1910 – 1918	Constituency abolished
Preceded by William Murray	Member of Parliament for Dumfriesshire; 1922–1924	Succeeded by John Charteris
