= 1925 Reform Party (New Zealand) leadership election =

Election in New Zealand

1925 Reform Party leadership election
- 27 May 1925
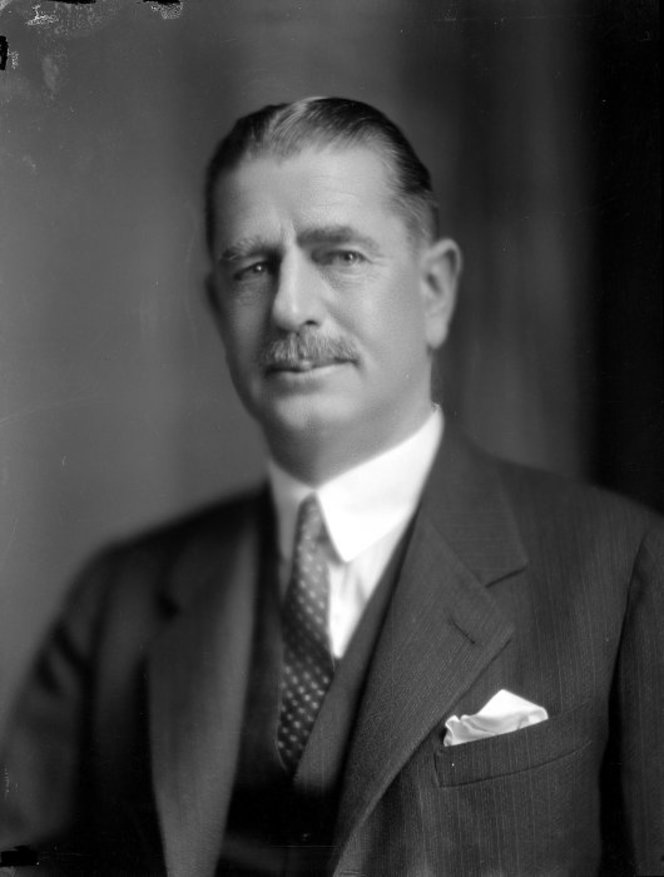

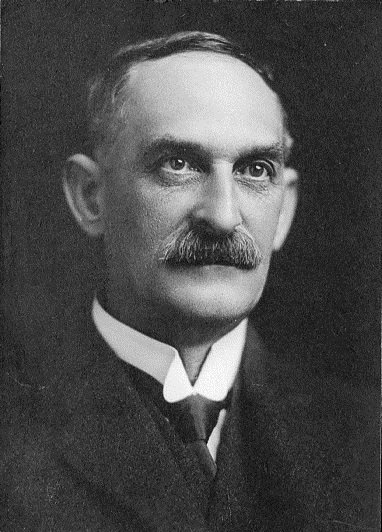
| Candidate | Gordon Coates | William Nosworthy |
| Popular vote | ≥19 | <19 |
Leader before election
Sir Francis Bell (acting)
Leader after election
Gordon Coates

An election for the leadership of the Reform Party was held on 27 May 1925 to choose the next leader of the party. The election was won by Kaipara MP and cabinet minister Gordon Coates.

== Background ==
After an inconclusive result at the 1922 election, the Reform Party government was reliant on several independent MPs to maintain power. Prime Minister William Massey had been in bad health and was progressively weakened by cancer during most of 1924 and by October of that year he was forced to relinquish many of his duties. He had an operation on 30 March 1925 which was unsuccessful and he died of cancer on 10 May 1925. Immediately after Massey's death the press began speculating as to his successor. The parliament was not then in session and the Reform Party had no clearly designated leadership successor. Massey had probably advised the Governor-General, Sir Charles Fergusson, to call on Sir Francis Bell as he had been acting Prime Minister before and, at 74 years of age, had no personal political ambitions. Bell was sworn in on 14 May and became caretaker Prime Minister. Bell ruled himself out as a permanent leader and made a point of scrupulously avoiding from any activity or decisions not of a stop-gap nature. His declination left the field open for the Reform Party caucus to freely choose a new leader.

== Candidates ==
Several candidates were named as possibilities to succeed Massey as party leader:

Sir Francis Bell
Bell was a member of the Legislative Council who was the party's most senior cabinet minister. At Massey's death he was Attorney-General and Minister of External Affairs. He became a stop-gap leader of the party and was sworn in by the Governor-General as Prime Minister until the party could select a permanent leader. While acting Prime Minister during Massey's illness Bell entertained the possibility of putting himself forward for the party leadership, but by April 1925 he thought his age (at 74) was against him and it would be better for the party to have a younger leader who sat in the House of Representatives rather than the Legislative Council. Despite Bell ruling himself out, there was speculation he might be persuaded to stand at least to remain leader in the short term and appoint someone to take charge of Government business in the House of Representatives.

Gordon Coates
The 47-year-old Gordon Coates had been the MP for Kaipara since 1911 and had been a cabinet minister since 1919. He had served in some senior portfolios including Minister of Justice, Postmaster-General and Minister of Native Affairs. An accomplished and personable man, he was not ideologically committed any particular philosophy, and by 1925 Coates had been singled out by many colleagues as the natural successor to the ailing Massey. Ahead of the caucus meeting he was considered the press and MPs as the heavy favourite to win.

Alex McLeod
The MP for Wairarapa since 1919, Alex McLeod, was a more recent addition to the cabinet. Since 1924 he had been Minister of Lands.

William Nosworthy
William Nosworthy had been the MP for Ashburton since 1908. In 1912 he became Reform's junior whip. Since 1919 he had been a member of the cabinet and was both Minister of Agriculture and Minister of Immigration.

William Downie Stewart Jr
A writer as well as a politician William Downie Stewart Jr had been the MP for Dunedin West since 1914. Despite suffering from crippling rheumatoid arthritis he was persuaded to enter cabinet in 1921 and was serving as Minister of Internal Affairs, Minister of Customs and Minister of Industries and Commerce. He was out of the country when Massey died, seeking medical treatment in New York. The decision being made in his absence, but it was thought unlikely that his health would have allowed him to fully undertake the role of Prime Minister.

== Result ==
A caucus meeting was held in the afternoon of 27 May 1925. Gisborne MP Douglas Lysnar and Stewart (who was still overseas) were the only absences. Bell chaired the meeting which began at 2:30pm and an hour long discussion ensued regarding leadership of the party. The meeting was informed that Stewart had cabled from New York that he did not wish to be a candidate. McLeod, having realised he had no chance of winning, also withdrew from consideration. Two names were nominated, those of Coates and Nosworthy. A ballot was held which resulted in Coates winning a majority. An independent MP who supported Reform, Allen Bell, also attended and cast a vote in the ballot. The precise result was not revealed by the scrutineer (Bell), but was thought to have been a decisive margin.

== Aftermath ==
News of the result came as no surprise to the press in their reports of the result. Soon after becoming leader Coates rejected an approach from the Liberal Party for a "fusion" of the two parties to better oppose the Labour Party. With the help of political organiser Albert Davy, Coates won a huge victory at the 1925 election. However his popularity declined and internal ructions in the party over policy led to Davy leaving. Davy set up a new party, the United Party, made mostly of remnants of the Liberal Party and at the 1928 election Coates' government was defeated. He continued to lead the party in opposition and in 1931, after United lost support from the Labour Party who opposed their policy of retrenchment, he gave support in the house to United. United and Reform contested the 1931 election as a coalition and were re-elected, but though Reform were the larger of the two, United leader George Forbes still remained Prime Minister. The United–Reform Coalition was defeated at the 1935 election. Coates continued as leader of the Reform Party until 1936 when it was absorbed into the new National Party.
