= 1908 Tuapeka by-election =

New Zealand by-election

- 5 June 1908
- Turnout: 2,966
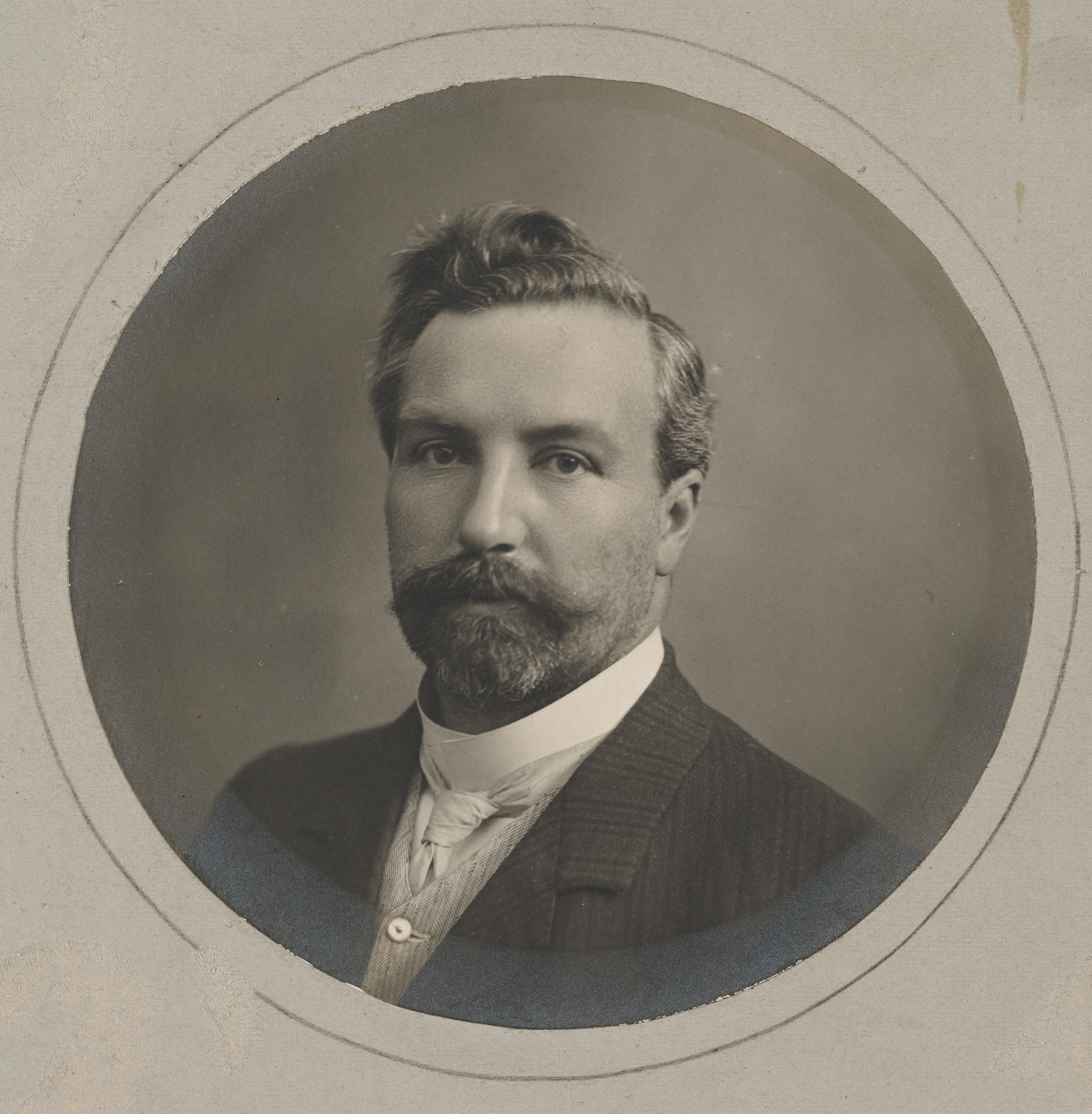

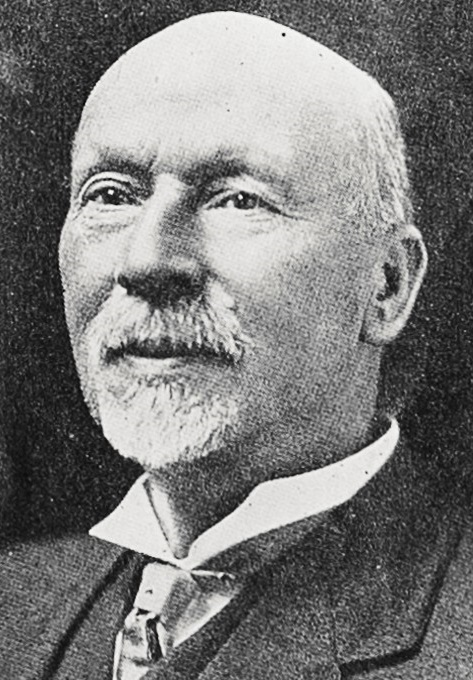

Candidate	William Chapple	James Horn	Robert Scott
Party	Independent Liberal	Liberal	Conservative
Popular vote	1,075	1,045	846
Percentage	36.24	35.23	28.52
Member before election
James Bennet
Liberal
Elected Member
William Chapple
Independent Liberal

The Tuapeka by-election was a by-election in the New Zealand electorate of Tuapeka, a rural seat at the bottom of the South Island.

The by-election was held on 5 June 1908, and was precipitated by the death of sitting Liberal member of parliament James Bennet. The election was won by William Chapple who stood as an independent Liberal.

== Result ==
The following table gives the election results:

1908 Tuapeka by-election
Party	Candidate	Votes	%	±%
Independent Liberal	William Chapple	1,075	36.24	
Liberal	James Horn	1,045	35.23	
Conservative	Robert Scott	846	28.52	
Majority		30	1.01	
Turnout		2,966		
