= Alfred Harding =

New Zealand politician

Alfred Ernest Harding (1861–1942) was an independent conservative Member of Parliament in New Zealand.

== Political career ==
New Zealand Parliament
Years	Term	Electorate	Party
1902–1905	15th	Kaipara	Independent
1905	Changed allegiance to:		New Liberal

He won the North Auckland electorate of Kaipara in the 1902 election and held it to 1905, when he was defeated by the Liberal candidate, John Stallworthy. In 1905, Harding had joined the breakaway New Liberal Party led by Harry Bedford and Francis Fisher.

In 1935, he was awarded the King George V Silver Jubilee Medal.
