= 1898 Tuapeka by-election =

New Zealand by-election

- 2 November 1898
- Turnout: 2,802 (77.83%)

Candidate	Charles Rawlins	John Ramsay
Party	Conservative	Independent Liberal
Popular vote	1,118	844
Percentage	39.90	30.12
MP before election
William Larnach
Liberal
Elected MP
Charles Rawlins
Conservative

The 1898 Tuapeka by-election was a by-election held on 2 November 1898 during the 13th New Zealand Parliament in the rural lower South Island electorate of Tuapeka.

The by-election was held to replace William Larnach after his death by suicide in Parliament during the 13th Parliament.

== Campaign ==
The winner was Charles Rawlins, described as opposed to the Liberal Government and with only Henry Symes as a government candidate or supporter with "ministerial inclinations" and Charles Rawlins as "opposition".

James Sim a farmer of Tapanui had been prepared to stand in the Liberal interest until his health broke down (or from lack of impression that he made and support?).

== Results ==
The following table gives the election result:

1898 Tuapeka by-election
Party	Candidate	Votes	%	±%
Conservative	Charles Rawlins	1,118	39.90	
Independent Liberal	John Johnson Ramsay	844	30.12	
Independent Liberal	Robert Gilkison	504	17.98	
Liberal	Henry Symes	296	10.56	
Liberal	James Sim	14	0.49	
Informal votes		26	0.92	
Majority		274	9.77	
Turnout		2,802	77.83	

== Outcome ==
Liberal papers such as the The Wanganui Herald opined that the seat was lost by the Liberal government not because the Conservative vote had increased so much as the Liberal Party in the area had become disorganised and split into three different factions. It warned that the Liberal Party should take warning by the Tuapeka result and organise its supporters better, otherwise it could lose seats in other electorates at the next general election where two or more Liberals oppose a single Conservative candidate.
