= Ruatuna =

Historic house in New Zealand

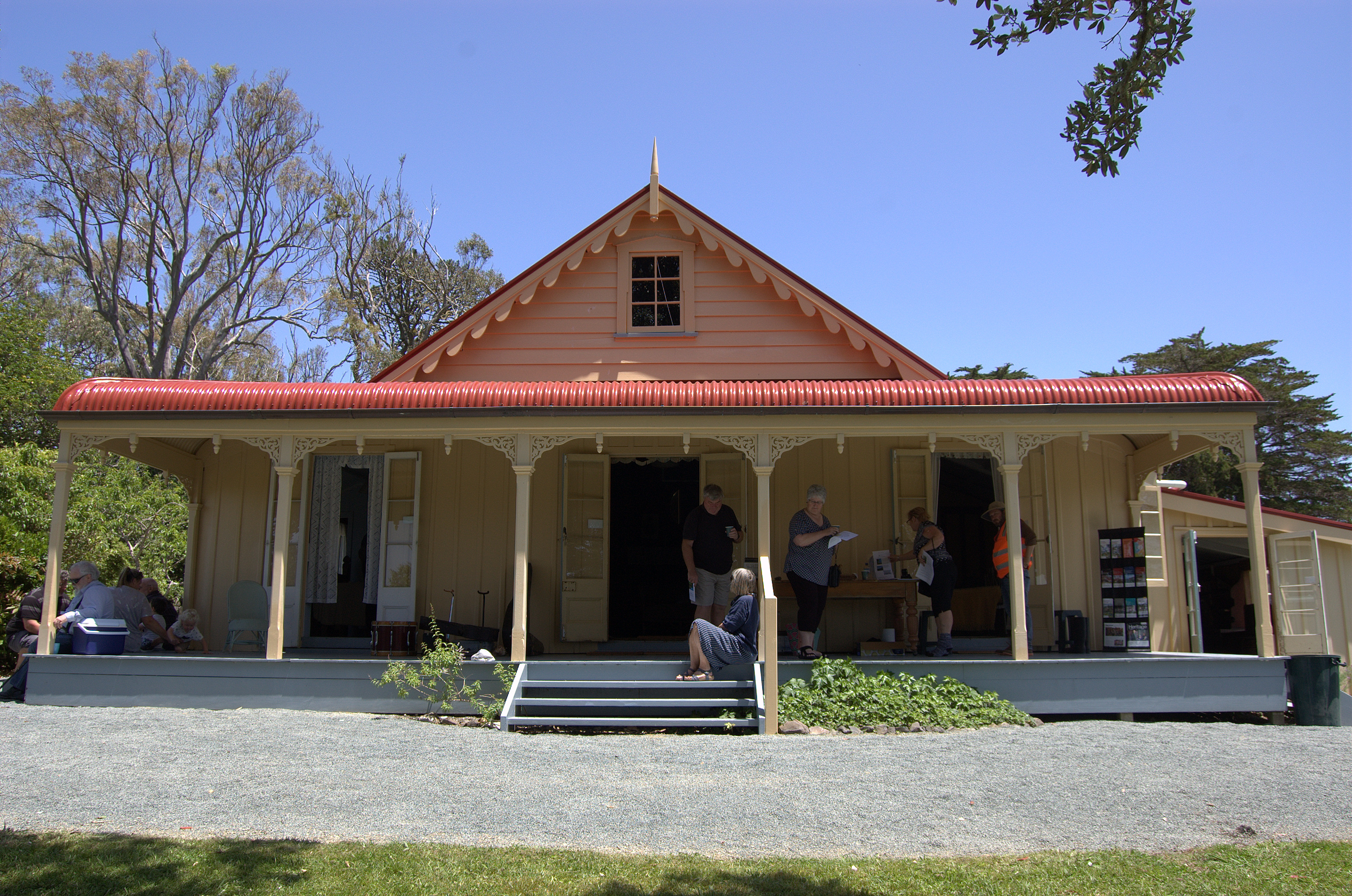
- Ruatuna

General information
- Architectural style: Georgian, Gothic
- Location: 441 Tinopai Road, Matakohe
- Coordinates: 36°9′54.21″S 174°10′18.02″E
- Completed: 1877
- Owner: Heritage New Zealand

Design and construction
- Main contractor: Samuel Cooksey
- Known for: Relation to Gordon Coates

Heritage New Zealand – Category 1
- Designated: 23 June 1983
- Reference no.: 7

Ruatuna is a historic homestead in New Zealand. Constructed for Edward Coates in 1877, Ruatuna was the home of Gordon Coates—the 21st prime minister of New Zealand—before he entered politics. The Coates family owned Ruatuna until 1976, when it was donated to the New Zealand Historic Places Trust. Today the building is managed by Heritage New Zealand and is registered as a category 1 building.

== Description ==
Ruatuna is located on an elevated section that overlooks both the surrounding farmland and Kaipara Harbour. Ruatuna features both Georgian and Gothic elements. It is a kauri timber single-storey structure with a gabled roof, the front has a verandah with the sides having lean-tos extending outward. The Coates family describe it as being based upon a Scottish hunting lodge and elements of the building such as the Gothic elements may have been used to create a connection between the building and the English gentry. Outbuildings include a dairy, shed, privy, a cottage (demolished c. 1961), a woolshed, stables, and a tennis court.

The interior of the homestead is preserved as a museum by Heritage New Zealand and contains ephemera, portraits of the Coates family, and a large book collection.

== History ==
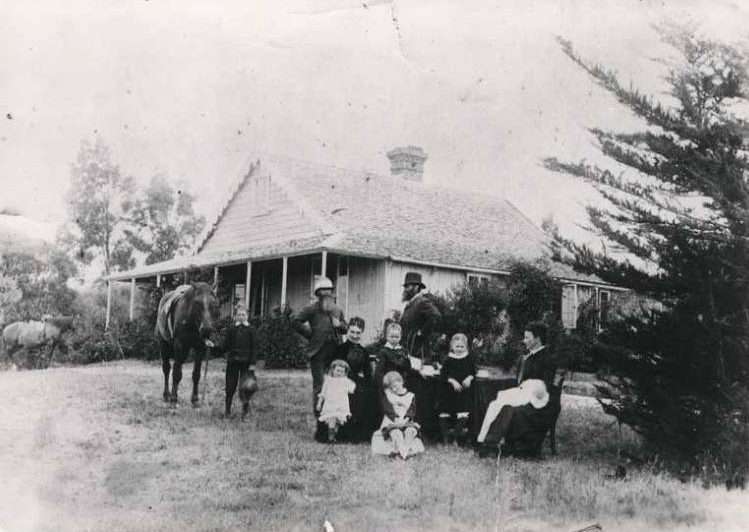
Ruatuna c.1905

Edward Coates, a member of the English gentry, arrived in New Zealand in 1866 later obtaining 12,830 acres (5,190 ha) of land and began importing sheep and cattle breeds, including the first Shropshire sheep and Hereford cattle, and transforming the grounds into orchards and fields. Ruatuna was built in advance of Edward Coates' marriage. Samuel Cooksey, a local builder, was contracted to construct it and construction began and finished in 1877. In 1893 the homestead was extended to provide a room for Gordon Coates and a schoolroom for his sister. In 1900 Gordon was helping run the farm along with his brother, he continued to run the farm until 1905 when he was elected to the Otamatea County Council. By the early 1900s the Coates had the largest flock of Shropshires in the country. In 1914 a garage was constructed to house a Hupmobile. c.1918 additions included a kitchen, bathroom, and two bedrooms. Around the 1940s the farm was subdivided and reduced in size.

In 1976, the last member of the Coates family bequeathed 6 acres (2.4 ha), including the homestead, to the New Zealand Historic Places Trust (NZHPT). The family held onto some of the original farmland until 1997, when it was purchased by the NZHPT, as an endowment for the site.

Restoration was undertaken at the homestead around 2011.
