= Charles Rawlins =

New Zealand politician

New Zealand Parliament
Years	Term	Electorate	Party
1898–1899	13th	Tuapeka	Independent

Charles Champion Rawlins (13 April 1846 – 10 July 1918) was a 19th-century Conservative Member of Parliament in New Zealand for just over a year.

Born in Liverpool, Lancashire, England, on 13 April 1846, Rawlins was a mining engineer. He arrived in New Zealand in 1875.

Rawlins stood in the Tuapeka electorate in the 1893 election; of the four candidates, he came second, beaten by Vincent Pyke. In the 1896 election, he stood in the same electorate but was beaten by William Larnach. He won the Tuapeka electorate in a by-election on 2 November 1898 after William Larnach committed suicide; and lost it in the 1899 general election, on 15 November 1899.

Rawlins died at Riverton on 10 July 1918, and was buried at Riverton Cemetery.
