= George Dash =

New Zealand politician and coachbuilder

George Dash MBE
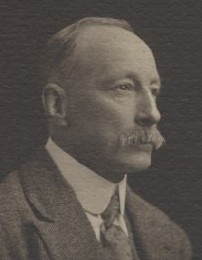

Mayor of Waimate
- In office 1925–1941
- Preceded by: William Evans
- Succeeded by: William Boland
- In office 1917–1919
- Preceded by: Norton Francis
- Succeeded by: William Evans

Personal details
- Born: 1871 Essex, United Kingdom
- Died: 8 June 1959 (aged 87) Waimate, New Zealand
- Resting place: Waimate Cemetery
- Spouse: Sophia Stevenson (m. 1901)
- Children: 1

George Dash MBE (1871 – 8 June 1959) was a New Zealand politician and coachbuilder who served twice as Mayor of Waimate, from 1917 to 1919 and from 1925 to 1941.

== Early life ==
Dash was born in Essex in 1871 to John and Ann Dash. The family left England in October 1875, sailing on the Otaki until reaching Lyttelton, New Zealand in February 1876 and immediately settling down in Waimate. His father opened a business building coaches, which Dash eventually took over.

== Political career ==
In August 1905, Dash announced his intent to contest the Waitaki electorate at the 1905 general election. He was unsuccessful, coming second to the incumbent William Steward.

In 1916, Dash was elected to the Waimate Borough Council. The next year he was elected mayor, defeating fellow councillor William Russell. During his first term as mayor he often clashed with his council, particularly councillor Robert Inkster, leading to eight councillors resigning in protest in March 1918 and forcing a by-election. Five of the eight protesting councillors were re-elected, while Inkster was among those who were not. Among those who were re-elected was councillor William Evans, who went on to defeat Dash in the 1919 mayoral election.

Dash returned in 1925 and was elected mayor unopposed. He defeated former mayor Evans in the 1927 mayoral election. He was re-elected unopposed in 1929, and his Progressive Party ticket swept the entire council. At the 1931 election he defeated councillor Forbes Wallace, a former ally of his. He was again re-elected unopposed in 1933 and 1935. He planned to retire in 1938, but decided to run for re-election at the request of residents and was again re-elected unopposed. Citing World War II as his reason, he ran for re-election in 1941 but was defeated by William Boland. A function was held to pay tribute to Dash's years of service, including speakers such as William Paul, John Bitchener, and David Campbell Kidd.

Dash was made a Member of the Order of the British Empire at the 1951 New Year Honours for services to local government. He had a private investiture in Timaru due to poor health.

== Personal life ==
Dash married Sophia Stevenson in 1901 and they had one son. They were both involved with the temperance movement. Sophia died on 15 August 1946. Dash died in Waimate on 8 June 1959, at the age of 87. They are buried next to each other in Waimate Cemetery.
