= 1905 New Zealand general election =

Elections on 6 December 1905

1905 general election
- 6 (general) & 20 December (Māori) 1905

All 80 seats in the New Zealand House of Representatives 41 seats were needed for a majority
- Turnout: 83.3%
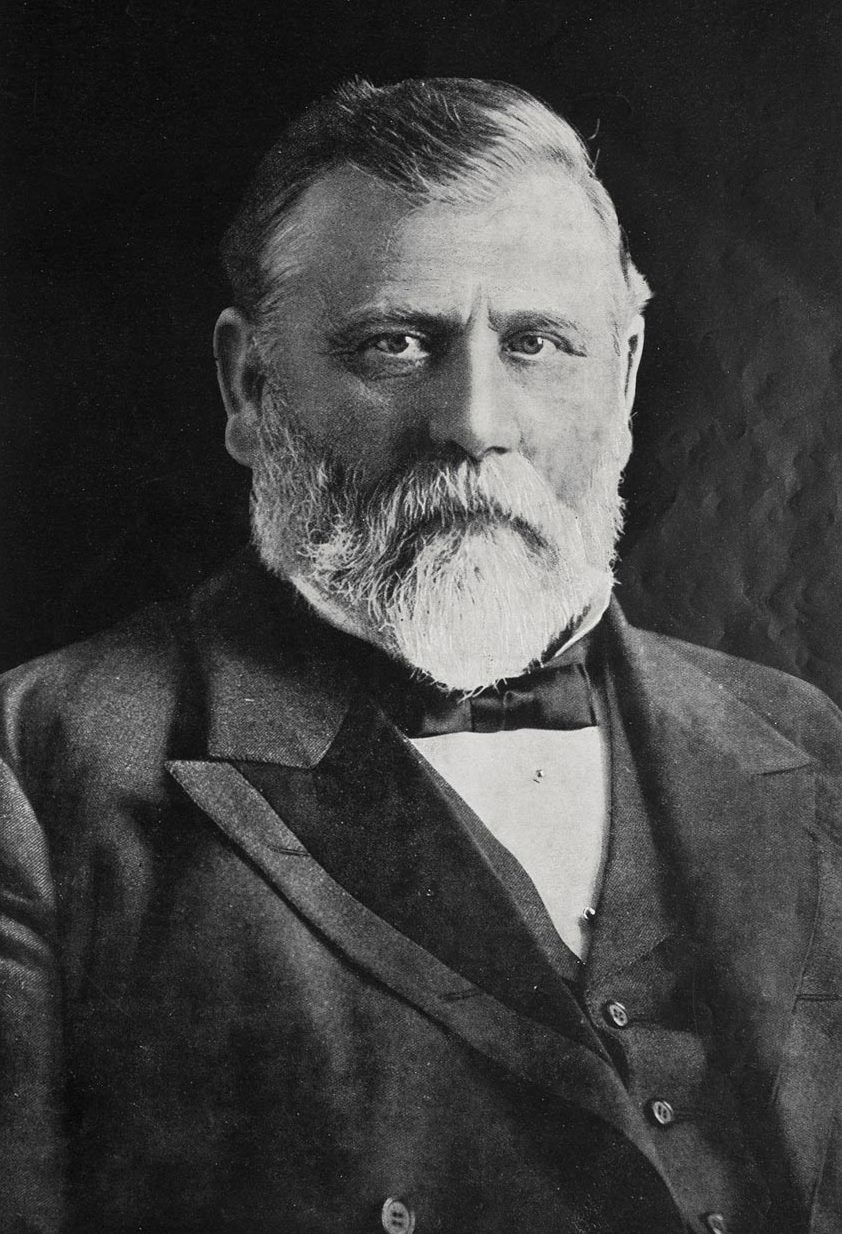

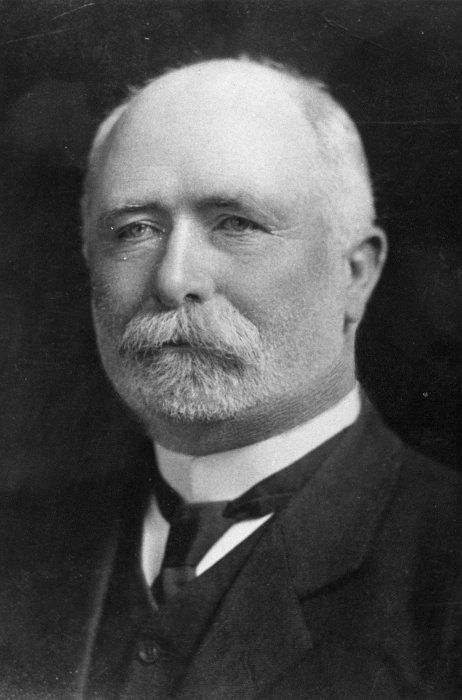

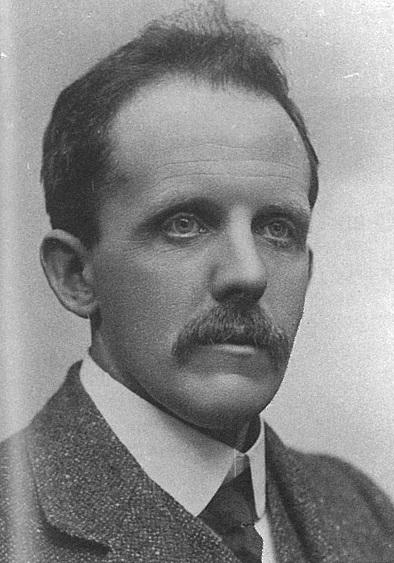
	First party	Second party	Third party
Leader	Richard Seddon	William Massey	George Laurenson
Party	Liberal	Conservative	New Liberal
Leader since	28 April 1893	11 September 1903	1905
Leader's seat	Westland	Franklin	Lyttelton
Last election	47 seats	19 seats	not yet founded
Seats before	42 seats	21 seats	4
Seats won	58	16	2
Seat change	▲16	▼5	▼2
Popular vote	219,144	122,572	15,721
Percentage	53.1%	29.7%	3.8%
Swing	▲1.3%	▲9.1%	▲3.8%
- Results of the election.
Premier before election
Richard Seddon
Liberal
Subsequent Premier
Richard Seddon
Liberal

The 1905 New Zealand general election was held on Wednesday, 6 December in the general electorates, and on Wednesday, 20 December in the Māori electorates to elect a total of 80 MPs to the 16th session of the New Zealand Parliament. A total number of 412,702 voters turned out, with 396,657 (83.25% of the electoral roll) voting in the European electorates.

== Changes to the electoral law ==
The 1903 City Single Electorates Act declared that at the dissolution of the 15th Parliament, the four multi-member electorates would be abolished and replaced each with three single-member electorates. It was also the year absentee voting was introduced for all electors unable to be in their own electorate on election day. The first Chief Electoral Officer was appointed.

Accordingly, the multi-member urban electorates of City of Auckland, City of Christchurch, City of Dunedin and City of Wellington were abolished and replaced with the following single-member seats:

- Auckland Central
- Auckland East
- Auckland West
- Christchurch East
- Christchurch North
- Christchurch South
- Wellington Central
- Wellington East
- Wellington North
- Dunedin Central
- Dunedin North
- Dunedin South

Nine of these twelve electorates had existed before. Wellington Central, Wellington North, and Dunedin North were established for the first time.

== Historic context ==
In 1905 a progressive faction within the Liberal Party started to form in opposition to Liberal leader Richard Seddon's policies. They announced that they would stand in the election as the New Liberal Party, however an accusation against Seddon's son, when disproven saw most of the dissidents return to the Liberal Party, and of the four New Liberals (George Laurenson, Francis Fisher, Harry Bedford and Tommy Taylor) that stood in the election only Laurenson and Fisher were returned.

The freshly created Independent Political Labour League also contested the election as a breakaway faction from the Liberals. It was the first of many steps of a gradual move by urban labourers shifting allegiance to an independent working-class political party. Previously, most workers had supported the Liberal Party, which since the 1890s had attempted to gain Trade Union support by appointing union representatives to the party's governing body. The IPLL did not perform well, gaining only 3,478 votes nationwide with no candidates elected.

The Rev Frank Isitt was the Prohibition candidate for several South Island electorates, and came second in two.

== Results ==
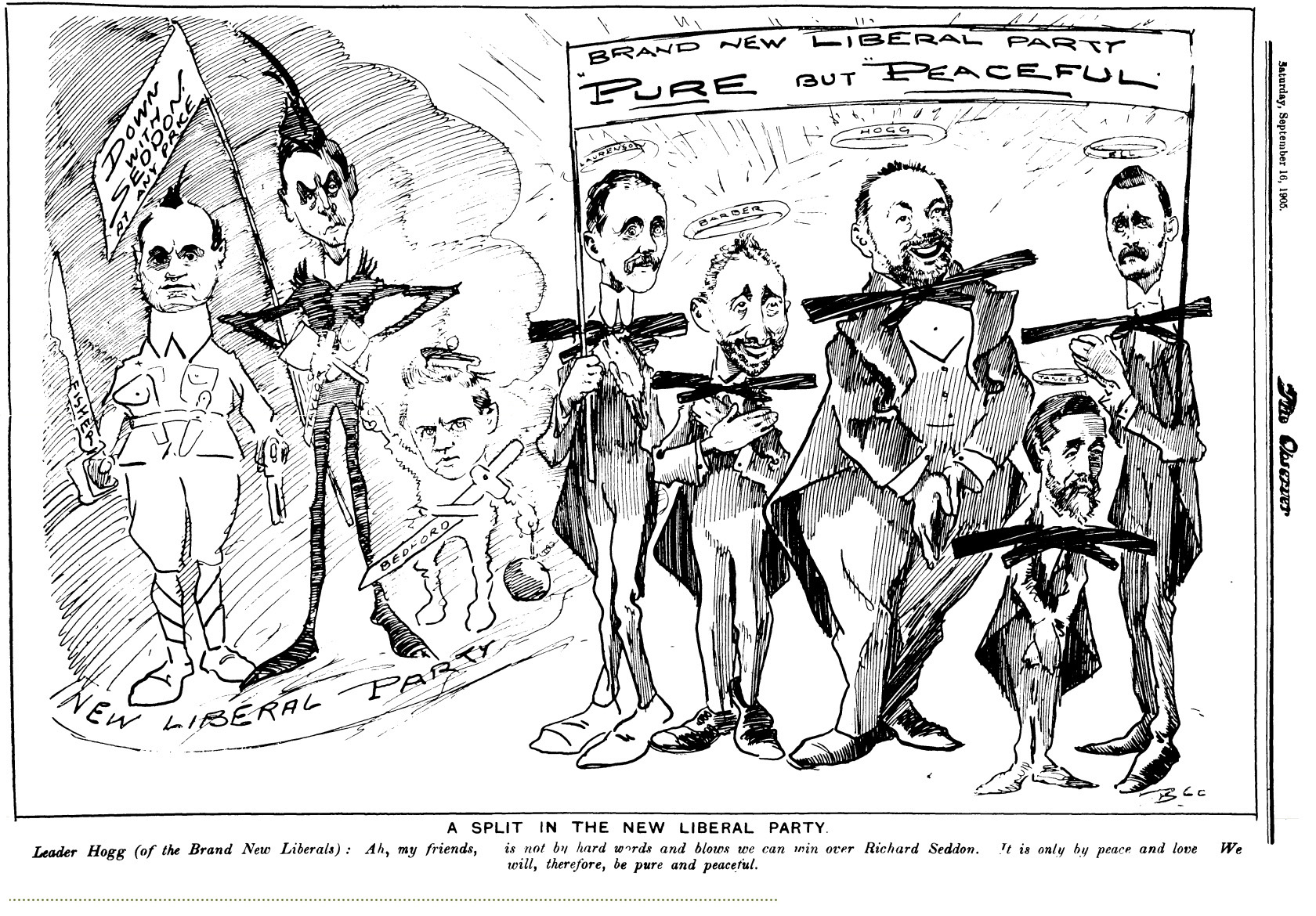
A cartoon depicting the infamous "Voucher incident" showing New Liberals distancing themselves from Fisher.

=== Party totals ===
The following table gives party strengths and vote distribution.

Election results
Party	Candidates	Total votes	Percentage	Seats won	Change
Liberal	94	219,144	53.1	58	+11
Conservative	63	122,572	29.7	16	-3
New Liberal	7	15,721	3.8	2	+2
Ind. Labour League	9	3,478	0.8	0	±0
Independent	63	51,785	12.5	4	-10

=== Votes summary ===
Popular Vote
Liberal	53.1%
Conservative	29.7%
New Liberal	3.8%
Ind. Labour League	0.8%
Independents	12.5%

Parliament seats
Liberal	72.5%
Conservative	20.0%
New Liberal	2.5%
Independents	5.0%

== Electorate results ==
The following are the results of the 1905 general election:

Key

Liberal Conservative New Liberal Liberal–Labour Independent Liberal Independent

Electorate results for the 1905 New Zealand general election
Electorate	Incumbent	Winner	Majority	Runner up
General electorates
Ashburton	John McLachlan		244	John Studholme
Auckland Central	New electorate	Alfred Kidd	939	Lemuel Bagnall
Auckland East	New electorate	Frederick Baume	871	Harry Bamford
Auckland West	New electorate	Charles Poole	340	James Parr
Avon	William Tanner		725	John Russell Brunt
Awarua	Joseph Ward		2,848	Henry Woodnorth
Bay of Islands	Robert Houston		470	John Charles Johnson
Bay of Plenty	William Herries		211	Joseph Foster
Bruce	James Allen		435	William Darcy Mason
Buller	James Colvin		2,798	Frank Isitt
Caversham	Thomas Sidey		1,760	William Earnshaw
Chalmers	Edmund Allen		1,437	William Pryor
Christchurch East	New electorate	Thomas Davey	565	Henry Featherston Toogood
Christchurch North	New electorate	Charles Gray	1,084	Tommy Taylor
Christchurch South	New electorate	Harry Ell	2,511	Charles Henry Winny
Clutha	James Thomson	Alexander Malcolm	272	Daniel Stewart
Courtenay	Charles Lewis		232	Thomas Jones McBride
Dunedin Central	New electorate	John A. Millar	1,919	Alexander Samuel Adam
Dunedin North	New electorate	Alfred Richard Barclay	514	Harry Bedford
Dunedin South	New electorate	James Arnold	780	William Downie Stewart
Eden	John Bollard		2,760	Robert French
Egmont	Bill Jennings		651	Charles Leech
Ellesmere	Heaton Rhodes		283	George Rennie
Franklin	William Massey		935	William Wilson McCardle
Geraldine	Frederick Flatman		1,233	William Jeffries
Grey	Arthur Guinness		377	Joseph Petrie
Grey Lynn	George Fowlds		230	John Farrell
Hawera	Charles E. Major		449	Felix McGuire
Hawke's Bay	William Russell	Alfred Dillon	1,043	William Russell
Hurunui	Andrew Rutherford		1,186	Obed Frederick Clothier
Hutt	Thomas Wilford		1,912	George Yerex
Invercargill	Josiah Hanan		1,721	Irvin Willis Raymond
Kaiapoi	David Buddo		45	Richard Moore
Kaipara	Alfred Harding	John Stallworthy	9	Alfred Harding
Lyttelton	George Laurenson		1,108	William Radcliffe
Manawatu	Job Vile	Jack Stevens	359	Job Vile
Manukau	Matthew Kirkbride		663	Ralph Duncan Stewart
Marsden	Francis Mander		348	Robert Thompson
Masterton	Alexander Hogg		859	James Christopher Cooper
Mataura	Robert McNab		435	Thomas MacGibbon
Motueka	Roderick McKenzie		2,733	Frank Isitt
Mount Ida	Alexander Herdman	Jack MacPherson	394	Alexander Herdman
Napier	Alfred Fraser		1,469	Montague W. P. Lascelles
Nelson	John Graham		29	Harry Atmore
Newtown	William Barber		1,213	Thomas William Hislop
Oamaru	Tom Duncan		2,009	James Mitchell
Ohinemuri	Edward Moss	Hugh Poland	351	Edward Moss
Oroua	Frank Lethbridge		986	Owen Carlin Pleasants
Otaki	William Hughes Field		1,394	Byron Paul Brown
Pahiatua	Bill Hawkins	Bob Ross	206	Bill Hawkins
Palmerston	William Wood		480	Frederick Pirani
Parnell	Frank Lawry		122	Murdoch McLean
Patea	Walter Symes		143	John Hine
Rangitikei	Arthur Remington		1,710	Joe Reginald Sommerville
Riccarton	George Witty		1,240	Thomas Caverhill
Selwyn	Charles Hardy		322	Joseph Ivess
Taieri	Donald Reid		535	Alexander Marshall
Taranaki	Edward Smith		236	Henry Okey
Thames	James McGowan		1,229	Malcolm Fleming
Timaru	William Hall-Jones		1,063	Frank Rolleston
Tuapeka	James Bennet		977	Robert Gilkison
Waiapu	James Carroll		1,798	Lissant Clayton
Waikato	Frederic Lang	Henry Greenslade	78	Frederic Lang
Waikouaiti	Thomas Mackenzie		702	Edward Henry Clark
Waipawa	Charles Hall		1,254	George Hunter
Wairarapa	Walter Clarke Buchanan	J. T. Marryat Hornsby	531	Walter Clarke Buchanan
Wairau	Charlie Mills		977	John Duncan
Waitaki	William Steward		1,643	George Dash
Waitemata	Ewen Alison		971	Cecil Clinkard
Wakatipu	William Fraser		423	Michael Gilfedder
Wallace	John Charles Thomson		461	Dugald Macpherson
Wanganui	Archibald Willis	James Thomas Hogan	924	Archibald Willis
Wellington Central	New electorate	Francis Fisher	445	Patrick O'Regan
Wellington East	New electorate	John Aitken	19	William McLean
Wellington North	New electorate	Charlie Izard	660	John Duthie
Westland	Richard Seddon		3,180	Harry Cowin
Māori electorates
Eastern Maori	Wi Pere	Āpirana Ngata	757	Wi Pere
Northern Maori	Hone Heke		627	Ru Reweti
Southern Maori	Tame Parata		160	Hopere Uru
Western Maori	Henare Kaihau		1,688	Tureiti Te Heuheu Tukino V
