= Thomas MacGibbon =

New Zealand politician

Thomas MacGibbon (9 October 1839 – 27 September 1925) was a member of the New Zealand Legislative Council from 14 July 1914 – 13 July 1921, when his term ended. He was appointed by the Reform Government.

== Biography ==
Born in Glasgow, Scotland, on 9 October 1839, MacGibbon was the son John MacGibbon, a grocer and tea and coffee dealer, and his wife, Jane McConachy. The family emigrated to New Zealand on the barque Mooltan, landing at Port Chalmers on 26 December 1849. They lived first in Dunedin, staying there until 1858, but eventually settled at Mataura by the end of that year.

MacGibbon married Isabella Williamson Nairn on 18 July 1867. For many years he was a storekeeper at Mataura, and he served as a member of the Mataura Borough Council, the Otago School Commissioners, the Southland Education Board and the University of Otago Council.

At the 1905 general election, MacGibbon unsuccessfully stood for the Mataura electorate, losing to the incumbent, Robert McNab by 435 votes. He was appointed to the Legislative Council in 1914, serving for seven years.

MacGibbon died at his home in Dunedin on 27 September 1925, and was buried at Andersons Bay Cemetery.
