= Tuapeka (electorate) =

Tuapeka is a former parliamentary electorate in the Otago region of New Zealand, from 1871 to 1911.

== Population centres ==
The 1870 electoral redistribution was undertaken by a parliamentary select committee based on population data from the 1867 New Zealand census. Eight sub-committees were formed, with two members each making decisions for their own province; thus members set their own electorate boundaries. The number of electorates was increased from 61 to 72, and Tuapeka was one of the new electorates. The Tuapeka electorate was landlocked and inland from the Bruce electorate. The town of Lawrence was within the electorate.

In the 1875 electoral redistribution, the electorate's area was unaltered, but boundary changes were introduced in subsequent electoral redistributions. In the 1890 electoral redistribution, the electorate moved further inland and the settlements of Tapanui and Roxburgh were gained. In the 1892 electoral redistribution, the electorate moved further inland again and Tapanui was lost again, but Alexandra was gained. In the 1907 electoral redistribution, the shape of the electorate changed significantly, and Lawrence was lost to the Bruce electorate, but large areas were gained from the Mount Ida electorate, including Ranfurly.

In the 1911 electoral redistribution, the Tuapeka electorate was abolished, and the vast majority of its area went to the Otago Central electorate.

== History ==
From 1855 to 1862 Vincent Pyke represented Castlemaine and Castlemaine Boroughs in the Victorian Legislative Assembly. Pyke represented Tuapeka from the 1893 election to 4 June 1894, when he died.

William Chapple, who represented Tuapeka for just four months following a by-election in 1908, later became an MP in the House of Commons, representing Stirlingshire (1910–1918) and Dumfriesshire (1922–1924).

=== Members of Parliament ===
Key

Independent Conservative Liberal Independent Liberal Reform

Election	Winner
1871 election	James Brown
1875 election	James Brown
1879 election	James Brown
1881 election	James Brown
1884 election	James Brown
1887 election	James Brown
1890 election	Hugh Valentine
1893 election	Vincent Pyke
1894 by-election	William Larnach
1896 election	William Larnach
1898 by-election	Charles Rawlins
1899 election	James Bennet
1902 election	James Bennet
1905 election	James Bennet
1908 by-election	William Chapple
1908 election	Robert Scott
(Electorate abolished 1911; see Otago Central)

== Election results ==
=== 1908 by-election ===
1908 Tuapeka by-election
Party	Candidate	Votes	%	±%
Independent Liberal	William Chapple	1,075	36.24	
Liberal	James Horn	1,045	35.23	
Conservative	Robert Scott	846	28.52	
Majority		30	1.01	
Turnout		2,966		

=== 1899 election ===
1899 general election: Tuapeka
Party	Candidate	Votes	%	±%
Liberal	James Bennet	1,758	50.91	
Conservative	Charles Rawlins	1,372	39.73	−0.54
Independent Liberal	Alexander Fraser	323	9.35	
Majority		386	11.18	
Turnout		3,453	73.16	
Registered electors		4,720		

=== 1898 by-election ===
1898 Tuapeka by-election
Party	Candidate	Votes	%	±%
Conservative	Charles Rawlins	1,118	45.34%	
Independent	John Johnson Ramsay	844	34.23%	
Independent	Robert Gilkison	504	20.44%	
Independent	Henry Symes	296	12.00%	
Independent	James Sim	14	0.57%	
Majority		274	11.11%	
Turnout		2,466		

=== 1894 by-election ===
1894 Tuapeka by-election
Party	Candidate	Votes	%	±%
Liberal	William Larnach	1,373	51.00%	
Independent	Scobie Mackenzie	1319	49.00%	
Majority		54	2.01%	
Turnout		2,692		

=== 1890 election ===
1890 general election: Tuapeka
Party	Candidate	Votes	%	±%
Conservative	Hugh Valentine	885	51.96	
Independent	James Clark Brown	818	48.04	
Majority		63	3.69	
Turnout		1,703	68.78	
Registered electors		2,476		
