= Gordon Coates =

Prime minister of New Zealand from 1925 to 1928

The Right Honourable Gordon Coates MC*
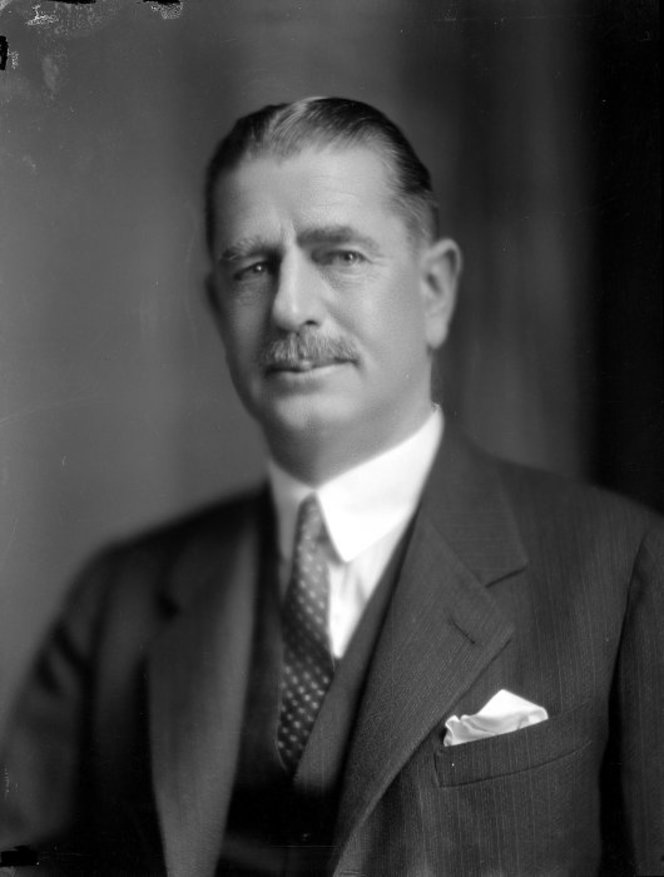
- Coates in 1931

21st Prime Minister of New Zealand
- In office 30 May 1925 – 10 December 1928
- Monarch: George V
- Governor-General: Charles Fergusson
- Preceded by: Francis Bell
- Succeeded by: Joseph Ward

26th Minister of Finance
- In office 28 January 1933 – 6 December 1935
- Prime Minister: George Forbes
- Preceded by: William Downie Stewart Jr
- Succeeded by: Walter Nash

11th Leader of the Opposition
- In office 10 December 1928 – 22 September 1931
- Preceded by: Joseph Ward
- Succeeded by: Harry Holland

21st Minister of Native Affairs
- In office 7 February 1921 – 10 December 1928
- Prime Minister: William Massey; Francis Bell; Himself
- Preceded by: William Herries
- Succeeded by: Āpirana Ngata

16th Postmaster-General
- In office 4 September 1919 – 30 May 1925
- Prime Minister: William Massey; Francis Bell
- Preceded by: Joseph Ward
- Succeeded by: James Parr

Member of the New Zealand Parliament for Kaipara
- In office 14 December 1911 – 27 May 1943
- Preceded by: John Stallworthy
- Succeeded by: Clifton Webb

Personal details
- Born: Joseph Gordon Coates; 3 February 1878 Hukatere, New Zealand
- Died: 27 May 1943 (aged 65) Wellington, New Zealand
- Party: Reform
- Spouse: Marjorie Grace Coles (m. 1914)
- Children: 5
- Awards: MC and bar
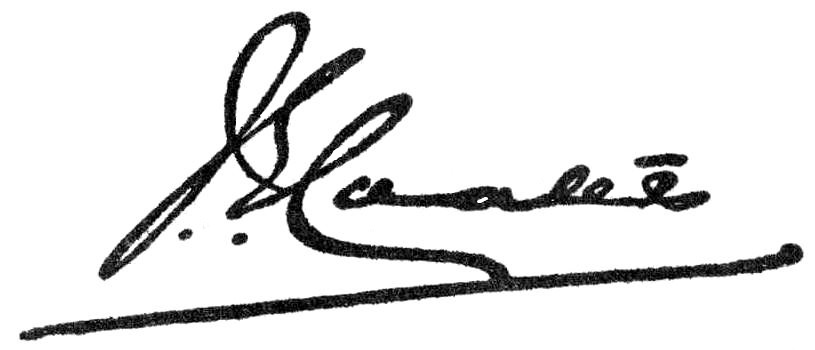
- Signature

Military service
- Allegiance: New Zealand Army
- Years of service: 1916–1918
- Rank: Major
- Battles/wars: World War I

Joseph Gordon Coates MC* PC (3 February 1878 – 27 May 1943) served as the 21st prime minister of New Zealand from 1925 to 1928. He was the third successive Reform prime minister since 1912.

Born in rural Northland, Coates grew up on a farm, which he took charge of at a young age due to his father's mental illness, before becoming a member of Parliament in 1911. He maintained a focus on farming issues and stood as an independent candidate. After distinguished service during World War I, he was appointed as Minister of Justice and Postmaster-General in the Reform government of William Massey (1919); he served as Minister of Public Works (1920–26) and Native Affairs (1921–28) and became prime minister in 1925 on Massey's death.

Defeated in the elections of 1928, Coates returned to government in 1931 as the key figure in the coalition government of George Forbes. Serving as Minister of Public Works (1931–33) and of Finance (1933–35), he instituted rigorous policies to combat the economic depression of the 1930s. He became a member of Peter Fraser's War Administration from 1940, serving as Minister of Armed Forces and War Co-ordination until his death.

== Early life ==
Born at Ruatuna, the family home on their sheep and cattle farm at Hukatere in the Matakohe district on the Kaipara Harbour, New Zealand, Coates took on significant responsibility at a relatively early age because his father suffered from bipolar disorder. He received a basic education at a local school, and his well-educated mother also tutored him. He became an accomplished horseman, although an accident left him with a bad leg for the rest of his life. The large Māori population of the area meant that Coates learned to speak some Māori and understood a lot more. Gossip suggests that before his marriage, Coates had two children by a Māori woman. He allegedly became engaged to Eva Ingall, a teacher, but her father forbade marriage on the grounds that the illness of Coates' father might prove hereditary. Eventually, on 4 August 1914, he married Marguerite Grace Coles, better known as Marjorie Grace Coles, by whom he had five daughters.

== Early political career ==
New Zealand Parliament
Years	Term	Electorate	Party
1911–1914	18th	Kaipara	Independent
1914–1919	19th	Kaipara	Reform
1919–1922	20th	Kaipara	Reform
1922–1925	21st	Kaipara	Reform
1925–1928	22nd	Kaipara	Reform
1928–1931	23rd	Kaipara	Reform
1931–1935	24th	Kaipara	Reform
1935–1936	25th	Kaipara	Reform
1936–1938	Changed allegiance to:		National
1938–1942	26th	Kaipara	National
1942–1943	Changed allegiance to:		Independent

While farming, Coates became active in farmers' organisations. He first became involved in politics with the Otamatea County Council, to which he won election in 1905. He served as the council's chairman from 1913 to 1916. He had previously distinguished himself as commander of the Otamatea Mounted Rifle Volunteers, and had a good local reputation. In the 1911 parliamentary election, Coates won the Kaipara seat, having stood as an independent candidate aligned with the Liberal Party. In Parliament he generally voted with the Liberals, and formed part of the group that allowed Joseph Ward to keep his position as prime minister. When Ward resigned and Thomas Mackenzie replaced him, Coates declined the offer of a ministerial position.

Gradually, however, Coates distanced himself from the Liberal Party – primarily because of his strong belief in freehold for farmers, which the Liberals generally opposed. Coates had developed this belief due to his own experience with leasehold on his family's farm. When a vote of no confidence took place in 1912, Coates voted against the Liberals, helping the opposition Reform Party come to power. By 1914, Coates had formally joined Reform. He did not, however, act as a particularly partisan member, and made friends with politicians of many different political shades. His political activities focused primarily on improving services for the Far North.

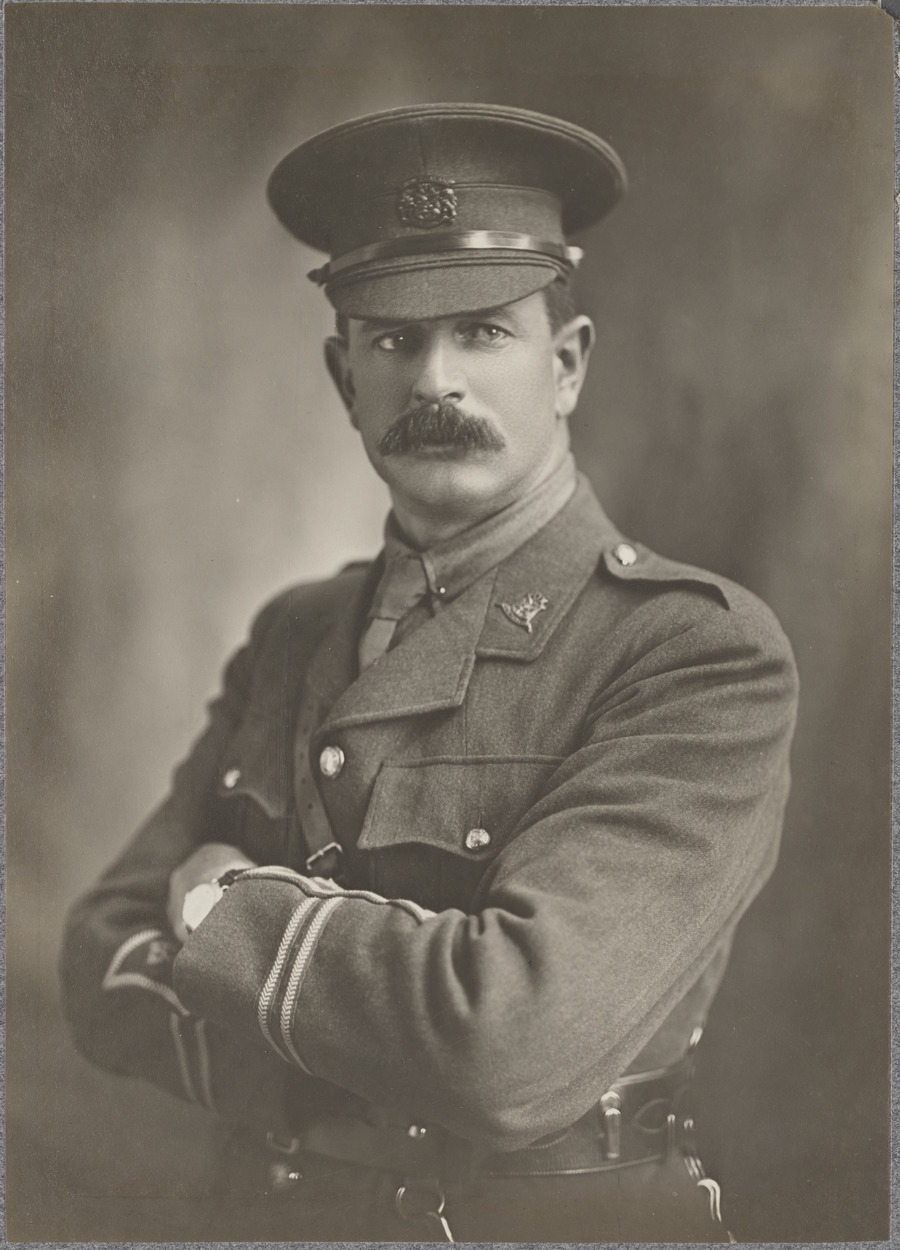
Captain J. Gordon Coates photograph (1920)

At the outbreak of World War I, Coates attempted to enlist for active service, but the prime minister, William Massey, dissuaded him from doing so, as the Reform Party had only a tenuous majority. In November 1916, however, Coates finally gained permission to join up. He served with considerable distinction, winning a Military Cross and bar. When he returned to New Zealand, many saw him as a hero, and on 2 September 1919 Massey appointed him to Cabinet as Minister of Justice, Postmaster-General, and Minister of Telegraphs. He later became Minister of Public Works and Minister of Railways. He also encouraged publicity for rail travel. From March 1921, Coates served as Minister of Native Affairs, where his knowledge of Māori proved a useful asset. He became a friend of Āpirana Ngata, and worked with him to help address Māori concerns. As Minister of Public Works Coates set up the regulatory framework for generation of electricity and reticulation. Likewise he initiated several major state hydro power schemes such as the Mangahao Power Station in the Tararua Range near Shannon which was officially opened on 3 November 1924.

== Premiership ==
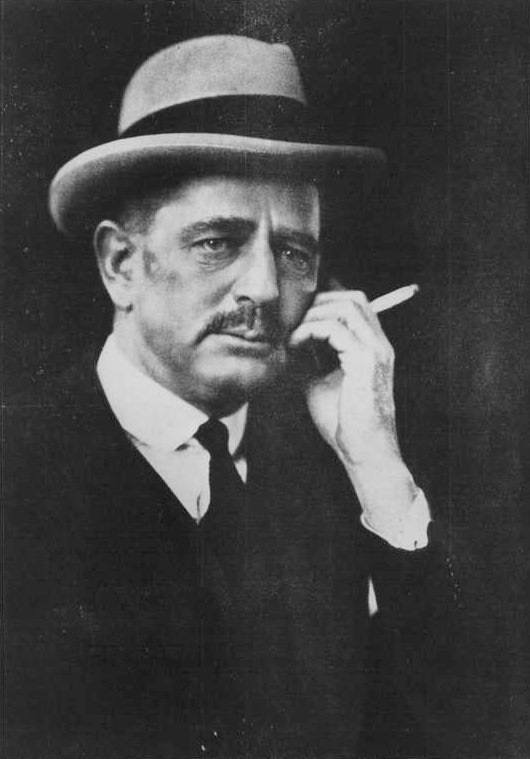
Coates in 1926

Coates' prominence gradually increased to the point where people saw him as a natural successor to Massey. When Massey died on 10 May 1925, Sir Francis Bell became caretaker prime minister while the Reform Party could make a decision on it long-term leadership. On 27 May 1925 Coates was elected Reform's leader having defeated William Nosworthy in a caucus ballot. The 74 year old Bell resigned to make way for Coates to become prime minister, aged 47, on 30 May.

The leaders of the Liberal Party met with Coates in June 1925 to discuss the 'fusion' of the two parties to better oppose the Labour Party. Coates had little enthusiasm for the idea, nor did Bell or any other seniors MPs in Reform, and the idea was rejected thinking that Reform would win the election on its own. Coates decided against making any changes to the cabinet before the election. The remainder of the parliamentary session was rather dull and seen as business as usual, rather than anything new in terms of legislation. The biggest talking point was Nosworthy's budget which revealed a healthy surplus. It included a reduction to the land tax and lowered the maximum rate of income tax. Also created were child welfare provisions including a children's court system, state supervision for support and supervision of delinquent, neglected and illegitimate children by child welfare officers.

The Reform Party's campaign organiser, Albert Davy, made Coates and his personality the focus of the 1925 election campaign. Being relatively young and New Zealand born Coates was seen as something of a political novelty which in and of itself garnered public interest. Reform's slogans were also about its leader such as 'Coates and confidence', 'Coates and certainties' and 'coats of with Coates' which were aggressively advertised in newspapers to convey safety and decisiveness. Personally, Coates was not ideologically committed any particular political or economic philosophy more noted for his good sense and pragmatism. Accordingly, when Reform's manifesto was released on 2 October was light on detail and mainly discussed broad sentiments. It spoke of Reform promising government stability, economic security, equal opportunities and New Zealand's role in imperial defence. Also included were commitments to complete all public works schemes already underway and gradually reduce overseas borrowing. It also famously borrowed the line "more business in government, less government in business" from American president Calvin Coolidge.

Coates drew large crowds during his election campaign, conducting a speaking tour. His speeches were likewise broad on sentiment and light on detail. Most spoke of the need for 'strong and stable government' with intention to 'govern for all' while labelling his own views as 'liberal and progressive'. This last point was discussed as atypical of the Reform Party which was made mostly of social and fiscal conservatives. During the campaign one of Coates' ministers, Sir James Parr, told a crowd in Auckland Coates was "no Tory ... he came from the people and was for the people; he stood all the time for justice to all sections of the community." He defended freehold land policy from Labour Party attacks and even promised to introduce a contributary insurance scheme to fund payments for the invalided and unemployed. Reform won a massive victory with 47% of the vote and 55 out of 80 seats.

The sheer scale of his victory would later turn into a difficulty of its own as Coates found it difficult to live up to the high expectations on him. This was seen almost immediately after the election when, contrary to the decisiveness promised in the campaign, Coates dithered as to his cabinet reshuffle. A somewhat sentimental man, he eventually revealed that he would retain most of Massey's cabinet with a few new additions which bloated the cabinet to 13 members. The reshuffle was not fully complete until April 1926 when Parr was sent to London as the new High Commissioner to the United Kingdom. Coates was losing his reputation for decisiveness. Unsure on how to capitalise on his election win, Coates had created a new Prime Minister's Department with his private secretary Frank David Thomson as department head to provide a 'greater measure of efficiency in dealing with official matters'. Parr's departure triggered a by-election in his seat of Eden. The by-election was a disaster for Reform as its vote was split between the official candidate and an independent Reformer, allowing Labour to win the seat. Only five months after Reform's landslide general election result, this was a huge election turnaround. Coates seemed unable to impose order on his party, a trait Massey had always been noted for.

He retained the native affairs portfolio throughout his premiership. He set up a royal commission on Māori land confiscations, known as the Sim commission after its chairman Sir William Sim a supreme court judge. The Sim commission looked into historic land confiscations, which was the cause of much bitterness. By mid-1926 serious problems were mounting. Export prices for meat, wool and butter were falling resulting in the country being in a trade deficit. The problem was spreading as lower profits from producers was causing unemployment to rise steadily. Coates' government came under attack in the house by the opposition, particularly over unemployment. Coates responded by pushing through emergency legislation empowering local authorities to borrow funds to create jobs. This had minimal effect leading the government to contemplate pausing immigration. By August a Family Allowances bill was introduced. It was a means-tested allowance from the Pensions Department for families on incomes of less than £4 a week with more than two children. Men in employment were assumed to be paid enough to support themselves, a wife and two children so no payments were made for the first two children. It was criticised from the left by Labour as being inadequate to the situation, as only 5% of the population were recipients. Rather than raise taxes, £250,000 was appropriated by Parliament. An innovative policy, and without precedence in the western world, it was also criticised from the right as encouraging dependence on the state.

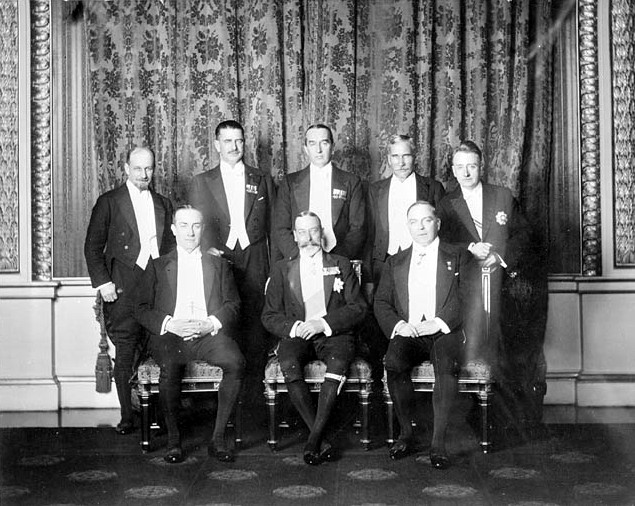
Coates (Back row second left) at the 1926 Imperial Conference

Coates had a temporary reprieve from domestic troubles when he left to lead the New Zealand contingent to attend the 1926 Imperial Conference in London. Though performing well, he disliked the formalities and protocols which he felt left little room for action after talk. Bell accompanied him through much of the conference which established the Balfour Declaration of 1926 which declared New Zealand and the other dominions as autonomous communities within the British Empire with equal in status. Coates and Bell were both against the idea. They were in agreement on defence with Britain and Australia for establishing a naval base at Singapore. Coates pledged that New Zealand would pay £1 million toward the construction. Late in the year Coates visited France and Belgium to visit cemeteries where New Zealand First World War soldiers were buried. He also briefly visited Ireland and while in Dublin was awarded an honorary doctorate. On route back to New Zealand he visited Canada and the United States. He met with Canadian prime minister William Lyon Mackenzie King, US Secretary of State Frank B. Kellogg and President Calvin Coolidge mostly discussing matters of the South Pacific. Soon after returning he hosted Prince Albert, Duke of York on his royal tour of New Zealand.

By February 1927 unemployment was still growing. Coates suspended immigration for several months as a reprieve for the problem. Farmers incomes were suffering due to the economic downturn in its British export market. The Dairy Board proposed to fix the price of butter on the British market to try and stabilise farmers' incomes. The government, recognising market conditions were unable to meet the board's demand, was forced to persuade the board to desist in March 1927. Coates was to receive much hostility from the farmers who continued to blame him for their continued financial woes. Rural areas, usually Reform's stronghold, were deeply dissatisfied with the government and had the opportunity to make their dissatisfaction known at the Raglan by-election in September 1927. Reform was embarrassed for the second time that term in losing a normally safe seat to Labour. Vote splitting was again rife with many farmers, who normally voted Reform, having a Liberal, Country Party and independent Reformer to vote for. Labour's successful candidate won mostly with votes from local coal miners. Even Reform friendly papers acknowledged popularity for Coates and his government had collapsed since 1925, though he still was able to attract crowds when he visited the electorate during the campaign.

Coates premiership was marked by an intention to develop the rural economy of New Zealand, from which he stemmed, particularly in terms of roads and transport infrastructure. To this goal, he dedicated a number of projects, such as the construction of the Kopu Bridge in the Coromandel Peninsula, which gave the local farmers better road access, and approving the construction of a Rotorua-Taupo railway which had long been sought after by settlers living between Rotorua and Taupo to open up the district. He also supported public works schemes as they offered jobs for unemployment relief.

As the Great Depression loomed and New Zealand's economy began to further deteriorate, Coates and the Reform Party attracted considerable criticism. Promised legislation had to be shelved such as the contributary insurance scheme promised at the 1925 election and in late-1928 it was dropped altogether. By 1927 Davy had fallen out with Coates and had left Reform and created the new United Party mostly out of the remainder of the Liberal Party with funds from disaffected former Reform donors. At the 1928 general election Reform and United Party won an almost equal number of parliamentary seats. When parliament met a vote of no confidence was called. Both United and Labour voted against the government, as did four independent MPs and the sole Country Party member, which saw Coates' government defeated 50 votes to 28. As a result Coates lost the premiership.

== Opposition ==
With the formation of the United government Coates became Leader of the Opposition. When United put forward their proposed Unemployment Act of 1930 to deal with the still growing numbers of unemployed Labour refused to support it. It required men to register as unemployed, but insisted on the principle of no pay without work, requiring men to labour in work schemes of dubious value receiving pay from an unemployment board. Without Labour's votes the bill could not be passed but Coates pledged Reform's support to allow it to pass. Coates thought the government was largely incompetent and were risking social cohesion with its austerity. He sensed a political opportunity to let United take the blame for the depression while leaving his own party comparatively clean. However the Reform Party conference in 1931 advised further co-operation with United. Against his better judgement Coates was persuaded to do so.

== Coalition ==
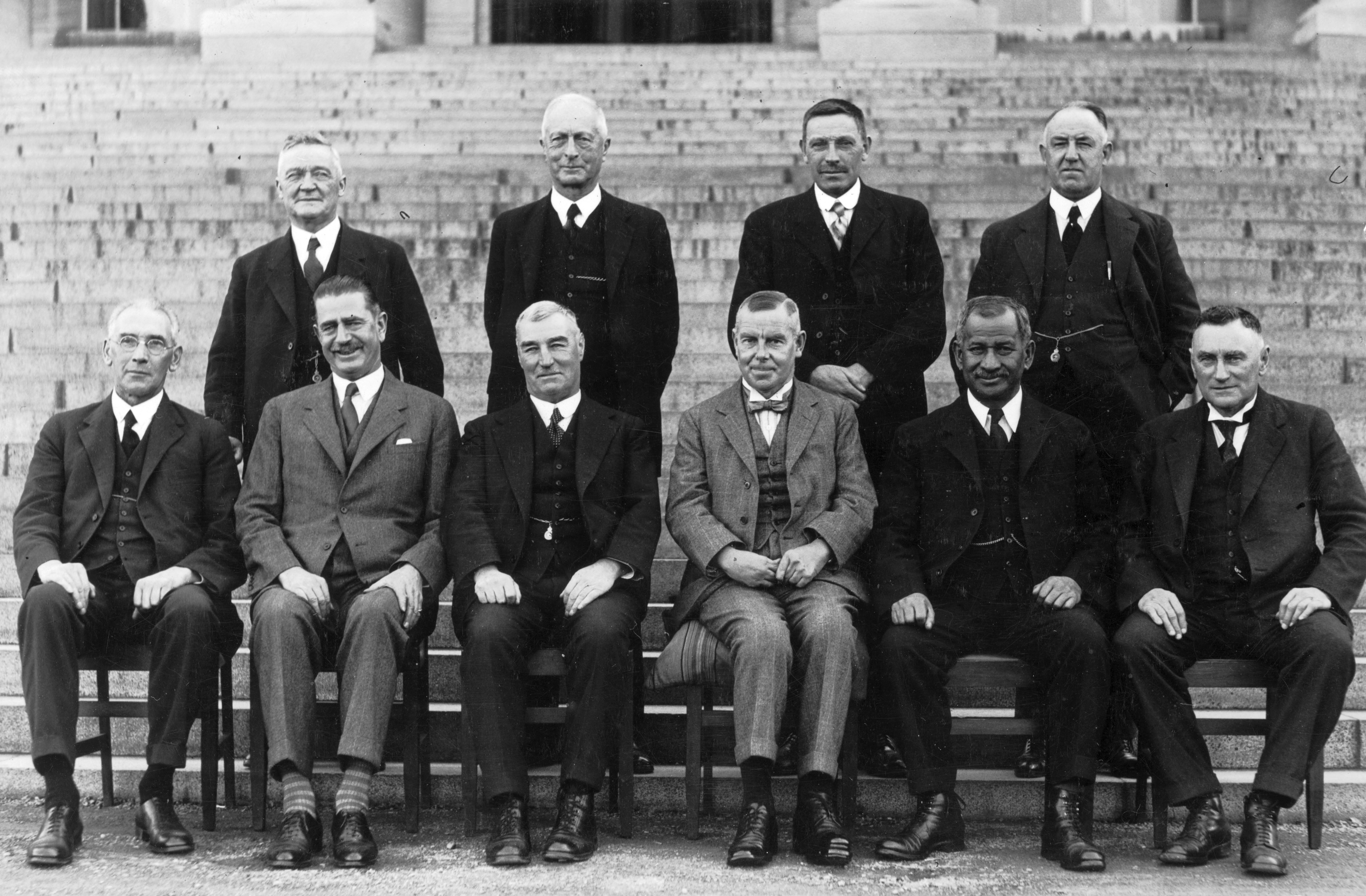
Coates (front row, second from the left) in the Coalition Cabinet, 1931

In 1931, the Labour Party completely withdrew its support from the United government, protesting about various economic measures which it regarded as hostile to workers. Coates and the Reform Party subsequently agreed to form a coalition with United, preventing a general election in which Labour might have made significant gains. United's leader, George Forbes, remained prime minister, but Coates and his Reform Party colleagues gained a number of significant posts. William Downie Stewart Jr, Coates' colleague, became Minister of Finance.

In the 1931 general election the United-Reform Coalition retained power, although Labour increased its share of the vote. Economic problems persisted, however, and unemployment continued to rise. Coates quarrelled with William Downie Stewart Jr over the government's response, and Coates himself became minister of finance. The prime minister, George Forbes, became increasingly apathetic and disillusioned, and increasingly Coates ran the government. Talk persisted about the emotional state of Coates. As finance minister he devalued the New Zealand currency and established the Reserve Bank of New Zealand in 1934.

In 1935, he was awarded the King George V Silver Jubilee Medal.

In the 1935 general election the coalition suffered a major defeat, winning only 19 seats: Coates nearly lost Kaipara. The Labour Party, which had won 53 seats, formed its first government and Michael Joseph Savage became prime minister.

== Later political career ==
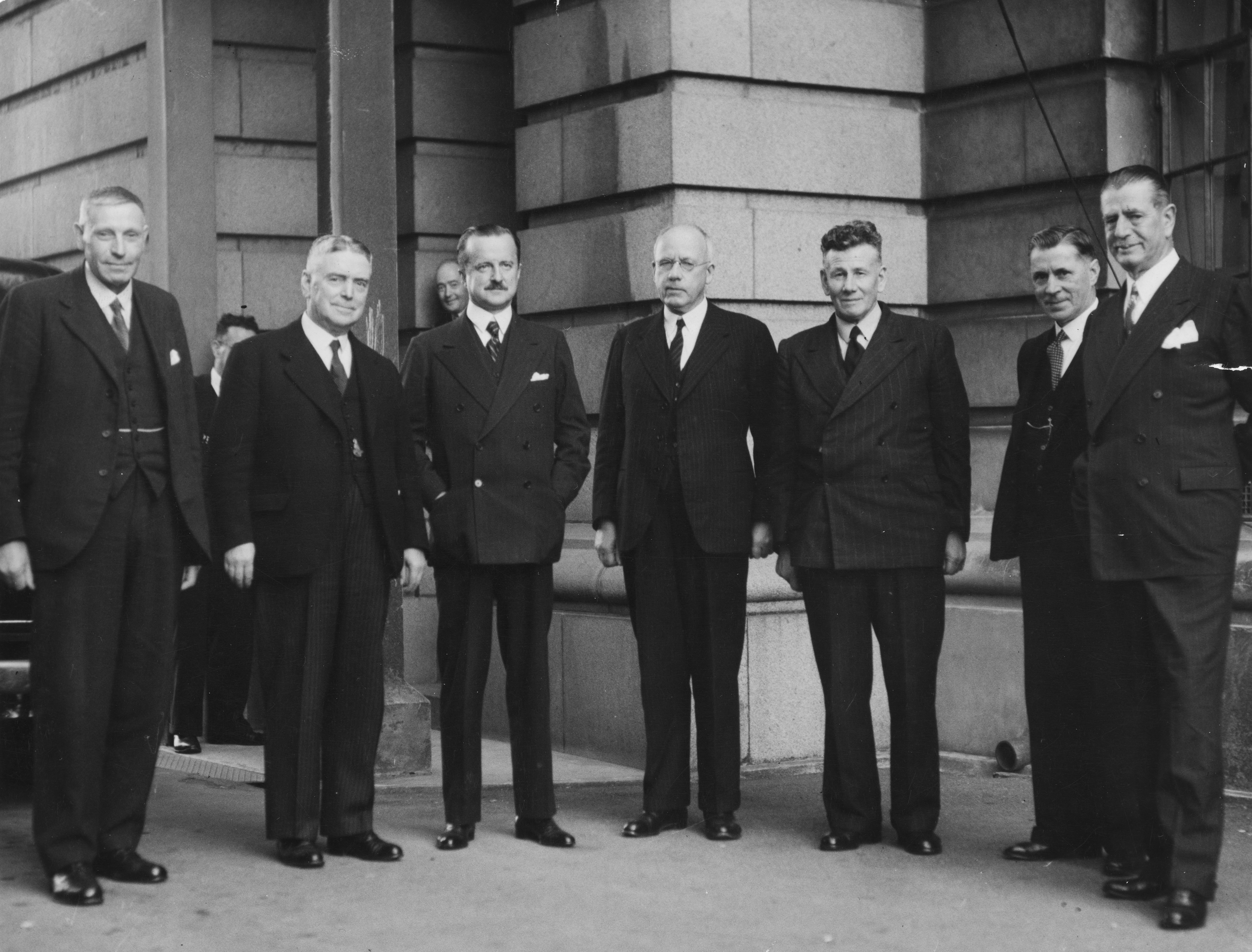
Coates (far right) with members of the War Cabinet, 1941

After the defeat of the coalition government, Coates withdrew from public attention to a large extent. He experienced a period of financial difficulty resulting from the sudden loss of income, but his situation improved when a group of friends presented him with a large sum of £550 as thanks for his long service.

When United and Reform merged to establish the National Party in May 1936, Coates sat as a National MP. Some of his supporters urged him to seek the party's leadership, but others within the party believed that both Coates and Forbes remained too closely associated with the country's economic problems, and that the new party needed fresh faces. Forbes supported Charles Wilkinson for the leadership, but Coates and his supporters rejected this choice, going so far as to threaten a re-establishment of the Reform Party if it went through. Eventually Coates preferred choice Adam Hamilton, a former Reform member, won the leadership ballot by one vote. Coates was a loyal supporter of Hamilton, who retained him on the frontbench as finance spokesperson. In the house Coates was critical of Labour's finance minister Walter Nash, arguing the government's new regulations would restrict competition, inflate costs and slow economic growth. At the same time he did concede that on reflection that the coalition government's austerity had gone too far and caused unnecessary hardship. Coates deputised at times for Hamilton including in August 1940 when, while Hamilton was ill, Coates was acting Leader of the Opposition when war was imminent with Germany. He ceased all politicking by National and advocated for co-operation with the government for the sake of national defence.

With the outbreak of World War II, the Labour government invited both Coates and Hamilton to join a special War Cabinet, which would be responsible for matters related to the war's prosecution. Their acceptance created a rift between them and their National colleagues – the party replaced Hamilton as leader over the issue, and relations between Coates and the new leader, Sidney Holland, deteriorated. Coates strongly believed partisanship was a misplaced approach during war, and attempted to convince both Labour and National to work together. He expressed pleasure when the two parties established a joint War Administration, with the War Cabinet serving as its executive body. The War Administration quickly collapsed, with the National members choosing to resign. Coates and Hamilton openly criticised this decision, and the day after their resignation became effective, they rejoined the War Cabinet on the invitation of the prime Minister, Peter Fraser. Coates thus became an independent, and he decided that he would contest the next election as an independent National candidate, not as the National Party's officially-nominated candidate. In the face of British decline during the war, Coates encouraged Fraser to develop closer strategic relationships with the United States instead.

== Death ==
Coates had smoked heavily for most of his life, and also had heart trouble. On 27 May 1943 he collapsed and died in his office in Wellington. The Labour Party eulogised him more strongly than did his National Party colleagues, although politicians from all sides of the House paid tribute to him.

== Legacy ==
Coates' style lived on through his mentee Keith Holyoake, later prime minister himself (1957; 1960–72), who saw Coates as his political role model. Both held each other in mutual admiration and respect and held shared views on opposition to socialism and state control while supporting individual freedom and private enterprise. Coates forayed into social welfare policy and centralised agricultural marketing which made enemies on the right in the 1920s and oversaw financial austerity which made him unpopular with the left in the 1930s. Historian Jim McAloon labelled Coates' policies as that of a pragmatic centrist.

Coatesville a small town in Auckland north of Albany was called Fernielea until 1926, when it was renamed after Coates.

== Notes ==
Government offices
Preceded by Francis Bell	Prime Minister of New Zealand; 1925–1928	Succeeded by Sir Joseph Ward
Political offices
Preceded by Thomas Wilford	Minister of Justice; 1919–1920	Succeeded by Ernest Lee
Preceded by Sir Joseph Ward	Postmaster-General and Minister of Telegraphs; 1919–1925	Succeeded by James Parr
Preceded by David Guthrie	Minister of Railways; 1923–1928	Succeeded by William Taverner
New Zealand Parliament
Preceded by John Stallworthy	Member of Parliament for Kaipara; 1911–1943	Succeeded by Clifton Webb
