= Harry Bedford (politician) =

New Zealand politician

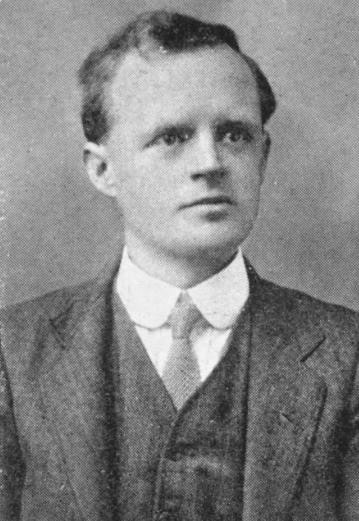

Member of the New Zealand Parliament for Dunedin
- In office 1902–1905
- Preceded by: Alfred Richard Barclay

Personal details
- Born: 31 August 1877 Leeds, England
- Died: 17 February 1918 (aged 40) Whangārei, New Zealand
- Party: Liberal
- Relatives: Richard Bedford (grandson)

Harry Dodgshun Bedford (31 August 1877 – 17 February 1918) was a New Zealand university academic and Member of Parliament for the City of Dunedin.

== Biography ==
=== Early life ===
Bedford was born in Hunslet, a suburb of Leeds, Yorkshire, England, in 1877. Alongside his four sisters and together with their mother, they emigrated to Invercargill in 1886 to reunite with his father. He received further education at Clifton School and left after Standard 6 (year 8) to work for his father's tailoring business. He completed a PhD at the University of Otago in 1916, with a thesis on the history of banking in New Zealand. He later became a professor of history and economics at the University of Otago in Dunedin. He married Ella Brown in 1907. One of their four children, John Dodgshun Bedford (born 1916), was the father of the human geographer Richard Bedford.

=== Member of Parliament ===
New Zealand Parliament
Years	Term	Electorate	Party
1902–1905	15th	City of Dunedin	Independent Liberal
1905	Changed allegiance to:		New Liberal

Harry Bedford represented one of the multi-member City of Dunedin seats in the New Zealand Parliament from 1902 to 1905.

Bedford was an independent Liberal in 1902 topped the poll for Dunedin City with 10,088 votes. He became the sensation of the 1902 election: a political novice who had obtained the highest individual vote ever recorded in New Zealand. The Lyttelton Times described him as "the 'idol of Dunedin' ... young, good-looking, able, earnest, energetic and highly attractive as a speaker". In 1905, Bedford stood for the new seat of Dunedin North but was not successful.

He contested Dunedin West in 1911 as an independent polling 3,635 votes to 778 votes for Jim Munro. The seat was held by John Millar on the second ballot. Harry Bedford joined the United Labour Party in 1912.

=== Death ===
Bedford drowned while swimming at Whangārei on 17 February 1918.

== Books ==
- Bedford, Harry D. (1908), Political Fingerposts: an Enquiry into what Labour should do and should not do, Dunedin, [N.Z.]: Printed by the Evening Star Co.
- —— (1916), Cost of Living in New Zealand: War Profit and War Finance, Dunedin, [N.Z.]: Printed by the Evening Star Co.
- ——; et al. (1904), The Land Question in Parliament, Wellington, [N.Z.]: Government Printer
