= New Liberal Party (New Zealand) =

New Liberal Party of New Zealand
- Founded: 1905
- Dissolved: 1908; 118 years ago
- Split from: Liberal Party
- Ideology: Social liberalism Progressivism
- Political position: Centre-left

The New Liberal Party of New Zealand was a splinter group of the original Liberal Party. It was formed at a meeting in the Christchurch suburb of Papanui in June 1905 by two Liberal-aligned independents who sought a more "progressive" policy than that followed by the Liberal leader, Richard Seddon, and was similar to the Radical Party in 1896.

== Background ==
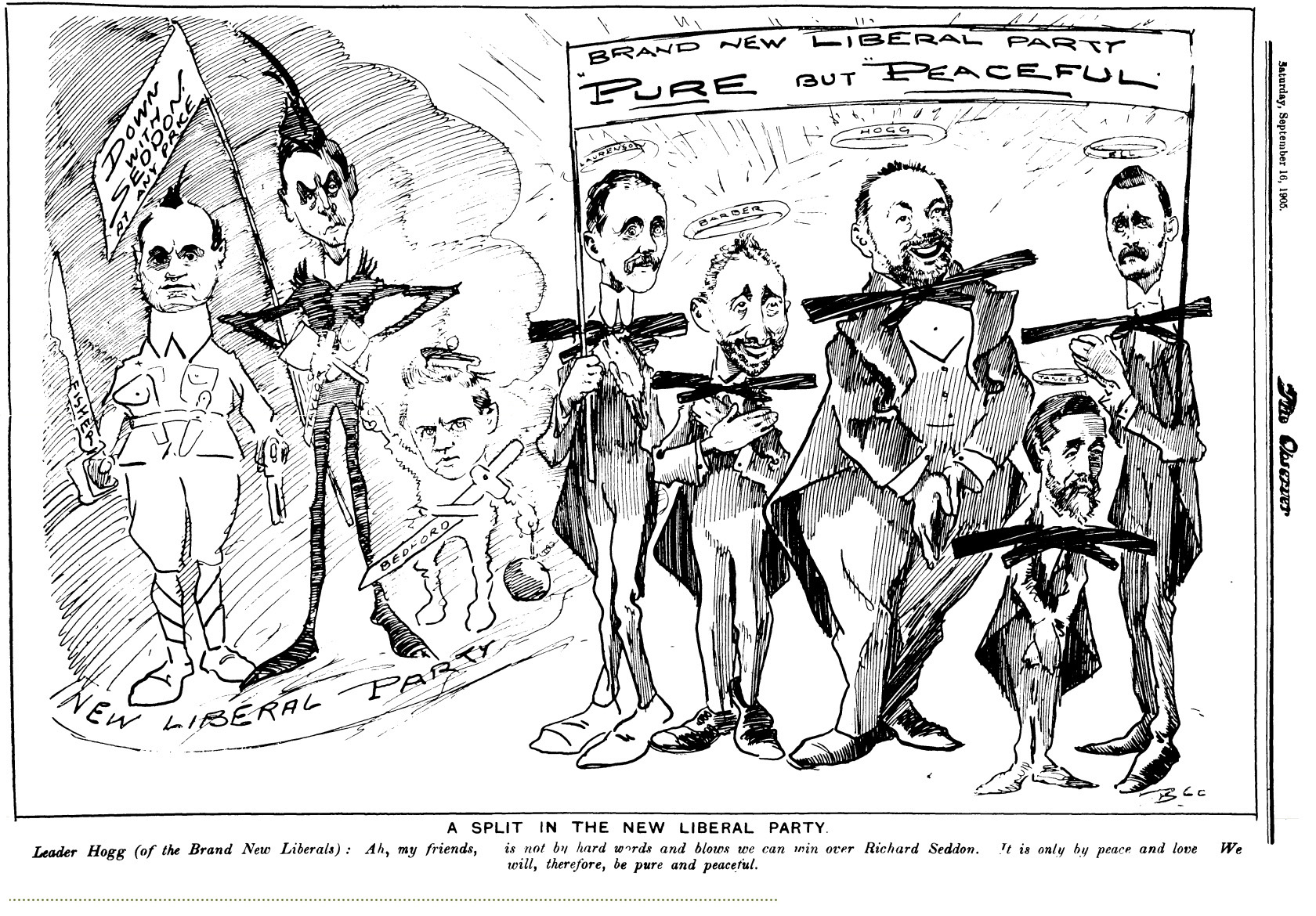
The "Voucher incident" caused a split in New Liberal Party as moderates distanced themselves from Fisher

The New Liberal Party was launched by Harry Bedford and Francis Fisher, but attracted a number of other MPs as well. George Laurenson, Frederick Baume, Alexander Hogg, William Tanner, and William Barber, all dissident Liberal MPs, associated themselves with the party, and two independents who had formerly been aligned with the loose opposition block, Ewen Alison and Alfred Harding, also joined. Tommy Taylor, a radical independent with a reputation as a firebrand, became the New Liberal Party's leader. Some Liberal dissidents, however, refused to be involved in the new party - the most notable being John Millar, George Fowlds, and Robert McNab. Many critics of Seddon believed that the New Liberals risked splitting the liberal vote and allowing a conservative government.

The New Liberal Party announced an intention to contest the 1905 elections, but there was debate as to the exact nature of the party. Some saw the New Liberals as being complementary to (and possibly even a part of) the Liberal Party, spurring it forward but not directly challenging it. Others saw the New Liberals as a completely independent group that would stand against and eventually supplant the original Liberals. As a result of this disagreement, the New Liberals never developed a party organisation outside Parliament, and did not institute block voting - the party consisted of little more than regular caucus meetings.

The New Liberals suffered considerable damage from the so-called "voucher incident", in which Francis Fisher alleged that Richard Seddon's son had been received payment from a government department for work he had not done. The allegations were disproven, and the New Liberals suffered a considerable public backlash. As Fisher had not consulted his colleagues before making the accusation, it also strained relations between party members. William Barber and Alexander Hogg sought rapprochement with Seddon, and others also appeared to distance themselves.

As the election approached, the New Liberal Party comprised only Bedford, Fisher, and Taylor. The party, which now considered itself fully separate from the Liberals, contested a number of seats, including those held by Liberal MPs. Of the party's three MPs, two were defeated — Fisher was the only one to remain in Parliament. By the 1908 elections, the New Liberal Party was defunct, and Fisher was re-elected as an independent. He later joined the Reform Party, established in opposition to the Liberals.
