= James Bennet (politician) =

New Zealand Parliament
Years	Term	Electorate	Party
1899–1902	14th	Tuapeka	Liberal
1902–1905	15th	Tuapeka	Liberal
1905–1908	16th	Tuapeka	Liberal

James Bennet (1830 – 3 May 1908) was a Liberal Party Member of Parliament in New Zealand.

Bennet was born in Forfarshire, Scotland.

Bennet stood in the Tuapeka electorate in the 1887 election and was beaten by the incumbent, James Clark Brown. He represented Tuapeka electorate from 1899 to 1908, when he died.
