= John Stallworthy =

New Zealand politician (1854–1923)

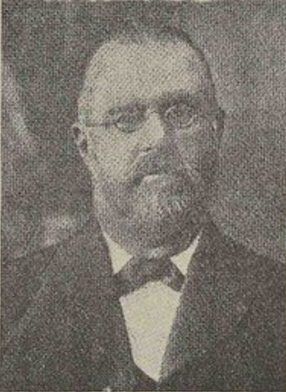
Photograph of John Stallworthy, MP for Kaipara

John Stallworthy (1854 – 10 November 1923) was a Liberal Party Member of Parliament in New Zealand. He was a teacher, newspaper editor, and sawmiller's trade union leader.

== Biography ==
He was born in the Samoan Islands in 1854; his father George was a member of the London Missionary Society. He received his education at Blackheath Proprietary School in London. He came to New Zealand in 1872 in the ship City of Auckland. His first job was at a sawmill in Whangaroa. He was employed by the Auckland Education Board from 1878, and worked at a school in Newmarket. In 1880, he was placed at Aratapu School in Hobson County, Northland. Aratapu is today a small settlement on the west bank of the Wairoa River, a short distance downstream from Dargaville, but back then economically as important as Dargaville if not ahead. He retired from teaching in 1890 to concentrate on his newspaper. He was also postmaster at Aratapu.

Stallworthy dominated the newspaper marked in the Hobson County area for 30 years. He started the Aratapu Gazette in 1884, and took over the Kopuru Bell in 1890 and changed its name to Wairoa Bell, and later purchased the Northern Advertiser and combined the papers to become the Wairoa Bell and Northern Advertiser.

For many years, he was a preacher for the Methodist Church, and he was prominent with temperance organisations.

New Zealand Parliament
Years	Term	Electorate	Party
1905–1908	16th	Kaipara	Liberal
1908–1911	17th	Kaipara	Liberal

He won the Kaipara electorate in the 1905 election, and held it to 1911, when he was defeated by the then Independent Liberal (later Reform) candidate Gordon Coates. Shortly after leaving parliament, he became blind, but this did not stop his activities, and he learned to use a typewriter for correspondence. At the time of his death, his was chairman of the Kaipara branch of the Farmers' Union, and chairman of the Kaipara Hospital Board.

Stallworthy died on 10 November 1923 at Te Kōpuru. He was survived by his wife, four sons, and four daughters. His eldest son, Arthur Stallworthy, represented the Eden electorate from 1928 to 1935.

== Bibliography ==
- Stallworthy, John (1916). Early Northern Wairoa. Kaipara District: Wairoa Bell & Northern Advertiser Printing Works.
