= Kaipara (electorate) =

Kaipara is a former New Zealand parliamentary electorate north of Auckland that existed from 1902 to 1946, and from 1978 to 1996.

== Population centres ==
The Representation Act 1900 had increased the membership of the House of Representatives from general electorates 70 to 76, and this was implemented through the 1902 electoral redistribution. In 1902, changes to the country quota affected the three-member electorates in the four main centres. The tolerance between electorates was increased to ±1,250 so that the Representation Commissions (since 1896, there had been separate commissions for the North and South Islands) could take greater account of communities of interest. These changes proved very disruptive to existing boundaries, and six electorates were established for the first time, including Kaipara, and two electorates that previously existed were re-established.

The electorate was rural and located north of Auckland city, in the North Auckland region.

== History ==
The electorate was created for the 1902 election, and abolished in 1946. The first representative was the independent conservative Alfred Harding. In the 1905 election, Harding stood for the breakaway New Liberal Party, but was beaten by John Stallworthy of the Liberal Party.

In the 1911 election, Stallworthy was beaten by Gordon Coates, who was Prime Minister from 1925 to 1928, and who held the electorate until he died in May 1943. As a (belated) wartime general election was to be held shortly, a by-election was postponed through the By-elections Postponement Act 1943, and Clifton Webb succeeded Coates at the general election in September 1943. When the Kaipara electorate was abolished in 1946, Webb successfully stood in the Rodney electorate.

Kaipara was recreated in 1978, and again replaced by Rodney in 1996. Lockwood Smith then transferred to Rodney, and later became the Speaker of the House.

=== Members of Parliament ===
Key

Independent	Liberal	Reform
National	Ind. National

Election	Winner
1902 election	Alfred Harding
1905 election	John Stallworthy
1908 election	John Stallworthy
1911 election	Gordon Coates
1914 election	Gordon Coates
1919 election	Gordon Coates
1922 election	Gordon Coates
1925 election	Gordon Coates
1928 election	Gordon Coates
1931 election	Gordon Coates
1935 election	Gordon Coates
1938 election	Gordon Coates
1943 election	Clifton Webb
(electorate abolished 1946–1978, see Rodney)
1978 election	Peter Wilkinson
1981 election	Peter Wilkinson
1984 election	Lockwood Smith
1987 election	Lockwood Smith
1990 election	Lockwood Smith
1993 election	Lockwood Smith
(electorate abolished 1996, see Rodney)

== Election results ==
=== 1943 election ===
1943 general election: Kaipara
Party	Candidate	Votes	%	±%
Independent National	Clifton Webb	4,950	56.77	
Labour	John Stewart	2,171	24.90	
Independent	Percy MacGregor Stewart	1,597	18.31	−21.33
Informal votes		45	0.51	−0.18
Majority		2,779	31.87	
Turnout		8,718		

=== 1938 election ===
1938 general election: Kaipara
Party	Candidate	Votes	%	±%
National	Gordon Coates	5,414	57.62	+8.78
Labour	Percy MacGregor Stewart	3,725	39.64	
Country Party	James Scott-Davidson	257	2.74	
Informal votes		65	0.69	−0.74
Majority		1,689	17.98	+14.87
Turnout		9,461	92.85	+3.17
Registered electors		10,190		

=== 1935 election ===
1935 general election: Kaipara
Party	Candidate	Votes	%	±%
Reform	Gordon Coates	4,738	48.84	−14.30
Independent	William Grounds	4,436	45.72	
Democrat	John Caughley	528	5.44	
Informal votes		141	1.45	+1.06
Majority		302	3.11	−23.16
Turnout		9,702	89.68	+5.21
Registered electors		10,818		

=== 1931 election ===
1931 general election: Kaipara
Party	Candidate	Votes	%	±%
Reform	Gordon Coates	5,008	63.14	−2.52
Country Party	Albert Edward Robinson	2,924	36.86	
Majority		2,084	26.27	−5.04
Informal votes		23	0.29	−1.10
Turnout		7,955	84.47	−3.38
Registered electors		9,418		

=== 1928 election ===
1928 general election: Kaipara
Party	Candidate	Votes	%	±%
Reform	Gordon Coates	5,190	65.65	−14.22
Labour	Jim Barclay	2,715	34.35	
Informal votes		111	1.38	−0.10
Majority		2,475	31.31	−29.92
Turnout		8,016	87.85	−1.07
Registered electors		9,125		

=== 1925 election ===
1925 general election: Kaipara
Party	Candidate	Votes	%	±%
Reform	Gordon Coates	6,307	79.87	+14.42
Labour	Bill Barnard	1,472	18.64	
Informal votes		117	1.48	+0.15
Majority		4,835	61.23	+28.98
Turnout		7,896	89.82	+0.04
Registered electors		8,790		

=== 1922 election ===
1922 general election: Kaipara
Party	Candidate	Votes	%	±%
Reform	Gordon Coates	5,001	65.45	−13.53
Liberal	Robert Hornblow	2,537	33.20	
Informal votes		102	1.33	−2.38
Majority		2,464	32.25	−29.43
Turnout		7,640	88.88	+11.24
Registered electors		8,595		

=== 1919 election ===
1919 general election: Kaipara
Party	Candidate	Votes	%	±%
Reform	Gordon Coates	4,214	78.98	+19.77
Labour	Alfred Gregory	923	17.30	
Informal votes		198	3.71	+2.20
Majority		3,291	61.68	+43.28
Turnout		5,335	77.64	−8.19
Registered electors		6,871		

=== 1914 election ===
1914 general election: Kaipara
Party	Candidate	Votes	%	±%
Reform	Gordon Coates	3,596	59.21	+3.52
Liberal	Richard Hoe	2,478	40.79	
Informal votes		92	1.51	1.29
Majority		1,118	18.40	+6.80
Turnout		6,074	85.83	+7.63
Registered electors		7,076		

=== 1911 election ===
1911 general election: Kaipara, Second ballot
Party	Candidate	Votes	%	±%
Independent	Gordon Coates	2,744	55.69	+19.32
Liberal	John Stallworthy	2,172	44.08	−1.33
Informal votes		11	0.22	−1.26
Majority		572	11.60	
Turnout		4,927	78.20	−2.22

1911 general election: Kaipara, First ballot
Party	Candidate	Votes	%	±%
Liberal	John Stallworthy	2,301	45.41	
Independent	Gordon Coates	1,843	36.37	
Reform	Edward Thurlow Field	848	16.73	
Informal votes		75	1.48	
Turnout		5,067	80.42	
Registered electors		6,300		
