= Robert Scott (New Zealand politician) =

New Zealand politician

New Zealand Parliament
Years	Term	Electorate	Party
1908–1909	17th	Tuapeka	Independent
1909–1911	Changed allegiance to:		Reform
1911–1914	18th	Otago Central	Reform
1914–1919	19th	Otago Central	Reform

Robert Scott (1854–1944) was a Reform Party Member of Parliament in New Zealand.

He was elected to the Tuapeka electorate in 1908, and for Otago Central in 1911. He was defeated for Wakatipu in 1919.

He was later on the Legislative Council.
