= 22nd New Zealand Parliament =

Term of the Parliament of New Zealand

22nd Parliament of New Zealand
←	21st Parliament	23rd Parliament	→
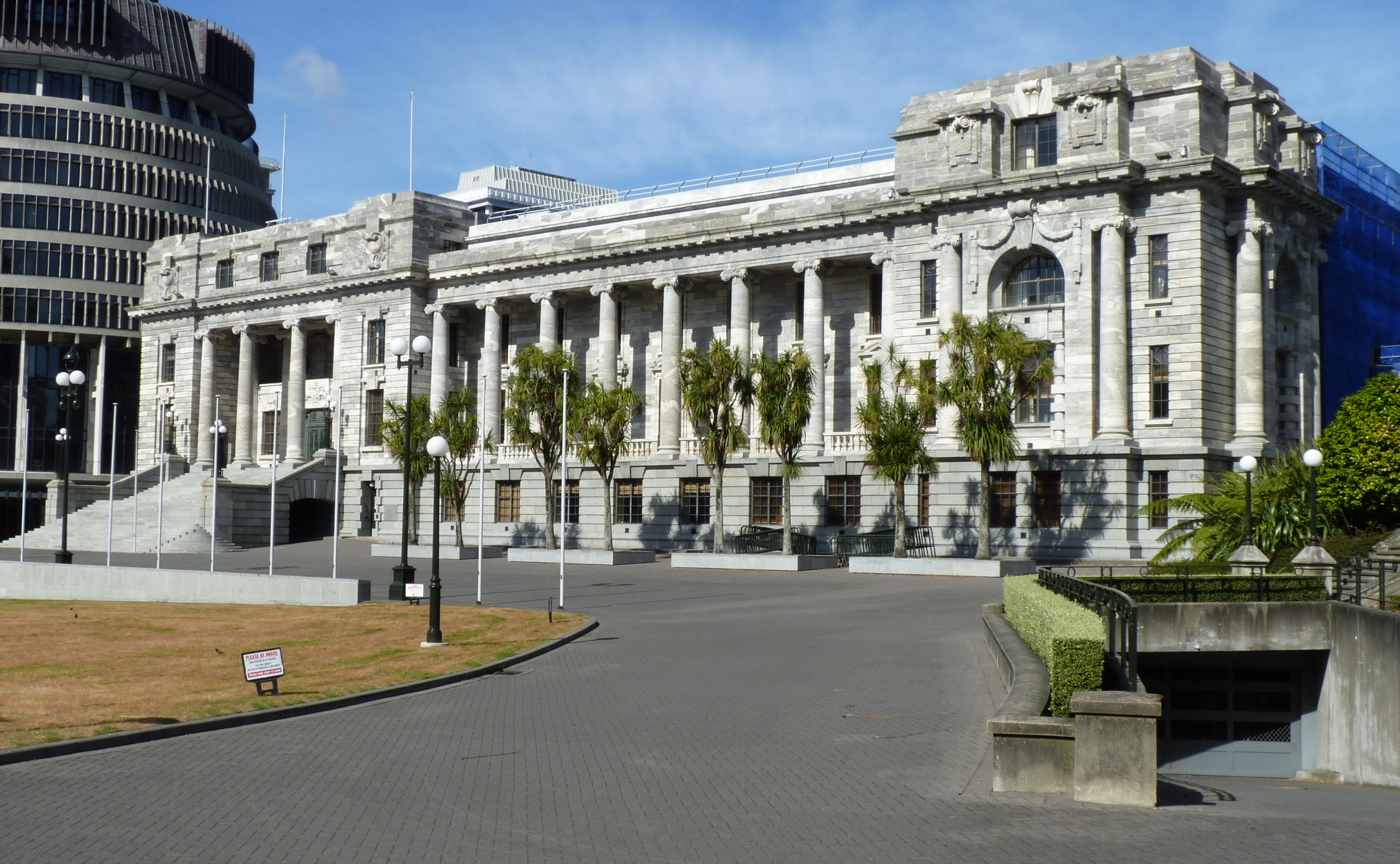
- Parliament House, Wellington

Overview
- Legislative body: New Zealand Parliament
- Term: 16 June 1926 – 9 October 1928
- Election: 1925 New Zealand general election
- Government: Reform Government

House of Representatives
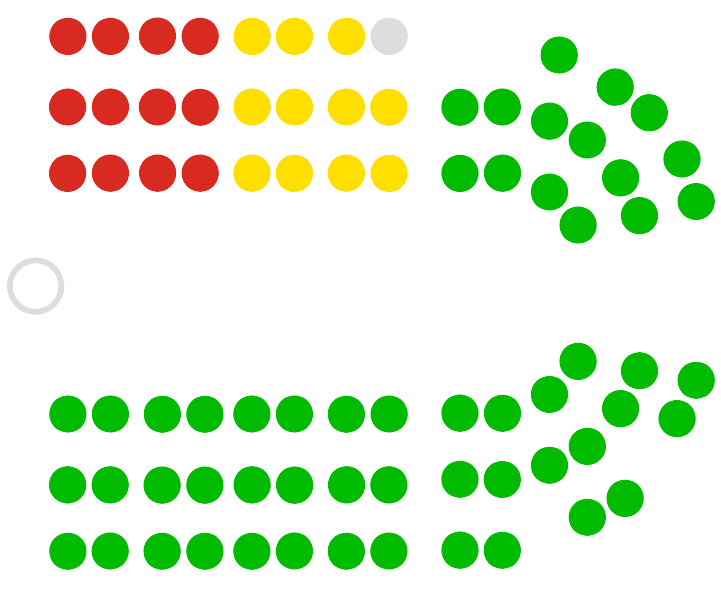
- Members: 80
- Speaker of the House: Charles Statham
- Prime Minister: Gordon Coates
- Leader of the Opposition: Harry Holland

Legislative Council
- Members: 41 (at start); 40 (at end)
- Speaker of the Council: Sir Walter Carncross
- Leader of the Council: Sir Francis Bell from 23 June 1927 — Sir Robert Heaton Rhodes until 14 September 1926

Sovereign
- Monarch: HM George V
- Governor-General: HE Gen. Sir Charles Fergusson

The 22nd New Zealand Parliament was a term of the New Zealand Parliament. Its composition was determined by the 1925 election, and it sat until the 1928 election.

== Historical context ==
The 22nd Parliament saw the Reform Party's Gordon Coates continue his rule as Prime Minister, in the continuing Reform Government.

The 22nd Parliament consisted of 80 representatives chosen by geographical electorates: 46 from North Island electorates, 30 from South Island electorates, and four Māori electorates. The Parliament was elected using the First Past the Post electoral voting system.

In 1926, the Reform candidate Sir James Gunson was expected to "romp home" in the Eden by-election. Reform had 55 seats. But with National (Liberal) having 11 seats plus two Liberal-leaning independents and Labour 12, Labour realised their chance to be the official Opposition, "threw their all" into the contest, and became the official Opposition; helped by Ellen Melville standing as Independent Reform. In 1927 a Labour farmer Lee Martin won the Raglan by-election against a weak Reform candidate plus Country Party, Liberal and Independent Reform candidates.

== Parliamentary sessions ==
The Parliament sat for three sessions:

Session	from	to
First	16 Jun 1926	11 Sep 1926
Second	23 Jun 1927	5 Dec 1927
Third	28 Jun 1928	9 Oct 1928

== Party standings ==
=== Start of Parliament ===
Party	Leader(s)	Seats at start
Reform Party	Gordon Coates	55
Labour Party	Harry Holland	12
Liberal Party	George Forbes	11
Independents		2

=== End of Parliament ===
Party	Leader(s)	Seats at end
Reform Party	Gordon Coates	53
Labour Party	Harry Holland	14
United Party	Sir Joseph Ward	11
Independents		2

== Initial composition of the 22nd Parliament ==
The election results were as follows:

Key

Reform Labour Liberal Country Party Independent Liberal Independent

Electorate results for the 1925 New Zealand general election
Electorate	Incumbent	Winner	Majority	Runner up
General electorates
Ashburton	William Nosworthy		2,117	John Nicholson Harle
Auckland Central	Bill Parry		3,500	Charles Augustus Wilson
Auckland East	John A. Lee		288	James Stewart
Auckland West	Michael Joseph Savage		476	Samuel Oldfield
Avon	Dan Sullivan		1,789	Walter Edmund Leadley
Awarua	Philip De La Perrelle	John Hamilton	220	Philip De La Perrelle
Bay of Islands	Allen Bell	Allen Bell	2,787	Hugh James Sweeney
Bay of Plenty	Kenneth Williams		Uncontested	
Buller	Harry Holland		1,532	C S Bielby
Chalmers	James Dickson		1,593	Michael Connelly
Christchurch East	Tim Armstrong		2,855	Denis Franklyn Dennehy
Christchurch North	Leonard Isitt	Henry Holland	2,910	Henry Thacker
Christchurch South	Ted Howard		1,569	Harry Ell
Clutha	John Edie	Fred Waite	1,653	John Edie
Dunedin Central	Charles Statham		2,299	John Gilchrist
Dunedin North	Jim Munro	Harold Tapley	262	Jim Munro
Dunedin South	Thomas Sidey		2,221	John McManus
Dunedin West	William Downie Stewart		2,478	R Harrison
Eden	James Parr		2,336	Rex Mason
Egmont	Oswald Hawken		1,290	W C G Green
Ellesmere	Heaton Rhodes	David Jones	634	Jeremiah Connolly
Franklin	Ewen McLennan		5,024	D McClymont
Gisborne	Douglas Lysnar		1,672	David Coleman
Grey Lynn	Fred Bartram		765	Ellen Melville
Hamilton	Alexander Young		4,725	Lee Martin
Hawke's Bay	Gilbert McKay	Hugh Campbell	726	Gilbert McKay
Hurunui	George Forbes		811	J G Armstrong
Hutt	Thomas Wilford		1,794	Walter Nash
Invercargill	Josiah Hanan	Joseph Ward	159	James Hargest
Kaiapoi	David Buddo		556	William Brock
Kaipara	Gordon Coates		4,835	Bill Barnard
Lyttelton	James McCombs (Note: Melville Lyons was elected for the Reform Party, originally the votes were equal (4900), then a recount found for Lyons. But on appeal his election was declared void on 13 March 1926, and the previous holder, James McCombs, was restored as the electorate representative.)		6	Melville Lyons
Manawatu	Joseph Linklater		2,074	Ben Roberts
Manukau	Bill Jordan		1,054	Jack Massey
Marsden	Alfred Murdoch	William Jones	651	Alfred Murdoch
Masterton	George Sykes		922	Jack Andrews
Mataura	George Anderson		2,664	W Hinchey
Motueka	Richard Hudson		2,102	Mark Fagan
Napier	Lew McIlvride	John Mason	573	Lew McIlvride
Nelson	Harry Atmore		2,349	Albert Gilbert
Oamaru	John MacPherson	Ernest Lee	1,097	John MacPherson
Ohinemuri	Hugh Poland	Albert Samuel	108	Hugh Poland
Oroua	David Guthrie	John Gordon Eliott	470	John Cobbe
Otaki	William Hughes Field		2,057	Bob Semple
Pahiatua	Alfred Ransom		113	Archibald McNicol
Palmerston	Jimmy Nash		3,240	Walter Bromley
Parnell	James Samuel Dickson		4,887	Robert Frederick Way
Patea	James Randall Corrigan	Harold Dickie	1,275	James Randall Corrigan
Raglan	Richard Bollard		2,856	Ernest Piggott
Rangitikei	Billy Glenn		1,963	Charles Joseph Duggan
Riccarton	George Witty	Bert Kyle	2,260	Winter Cole
Roskill	Vivian Potter		2,913	Alfred Hall-Skelton
Rotorua	Frank Hockly		2,776	Cecil Clinkard
Stratford	Robert Masters	Edward Walter	269	Robert Masters
Taranaki	Sydney George Smith	Charles Bellringer	50	Sydney George Smith
Tauranga	Charles Macmillan		2,310	Robert Coulter
Temuka	Thomas Burnett		535	Charles John Talbot
Thames	Thomas William Rhodes		3,307	W E G Willy
Timaru	Frank Rolleston		2,486	Percy Vinnell
Waikato	Frederick Lye	Stewart Reid	918	Frederick Lye
Waimarino	Frank Langstone	Robert William Smith	140	Frank Langstone
Waipawa	George Hunter		1,781	William Ashton Chambers
Wairarapa	Alex McLeod		1,424	F T Arkle
Wairau	William Girling		1,949	Richard McCallum
Waitaki	John Bitchener		502	George Barclay
Waitemata	Alexander Harris		3,577	Arthur Osborne
Waitomo	John Rolleston		1,435	Walter Broadfoot
Wakatipu	James Horn		843	James Ritchie
Wallace	John Charles Thomson	Adam Hamilton	1,328	James Morris MacKenzie
Wanganui	Bill Veitch		891	John Coull
Wellington Central	Peter Fraser		2,390	Andrew Sloane
Wellington East	Alec Monteith	Thomas Forsyth	1,195	Alec Monteith
Wellington North	John Luke		1,946	Harry Combs
Wellington South	Robert McKeen		1,474	Archie Sievwright
Wellington Suburbs	Robert Wright		1,542	Charles Chapman
Westland	James O'Brien	Tom Seddon	12	James O'Brien
Māori electorates
Eastern Maori	Āpirana Ngata		3,604	Hone Mokena
Northern Maori	Taurekareka Henare		1,609	Hone Wi Kaitaia
Southern Maori	Henare Uru		16	Tuiti MacDonald
Western Maori	Māui Pōmare		2,723	Rangi Mawhete

Table footnotes:

== By-elections during 22nd Parliament ==
There were a number of changes during the term of the 22nd Parliament.

Electorate and by-election		Date	Incumbent	Cause	Winner
Eden	1926	15 April	James Parr	Appointed High Commissioner, UK	Rex Mason
Raglan	1927	29 September	Richard Bollard	Death	Lee Martin
