= 21st New Zealand Parliament =

Term of the Parliament of New Zealand

21st Parliament of New Zealand
←	20th Parliament	22nd Parliament	→
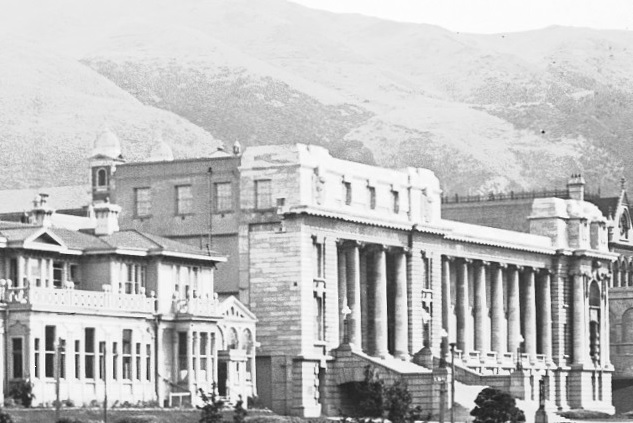
- Parliament House, Wellington

Overview
- Legislative body: New Zealand Parliament
- Term: 7 February 1923 – 1 October 1925
- Election: 1922 New Zealand general election
- Government: Reform Government

House of Representatives
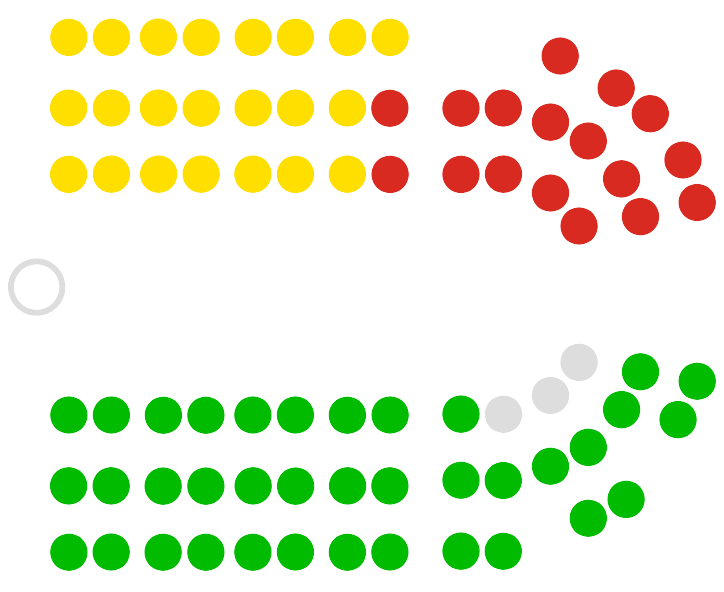
- Members: 80
- Speaker of the House: Charles Statham
- Prime Minister: Gordon Coates from 30 May 1925 — William Massey until 14 May 1925 †
- Leader of the Opposition: George Forbes — Thomas Wilford until 13 August 1925

Legislative Council
- Members: 38
- Speaker of the Council: Sir Walter Carncross
- Leader of the Council: Sir Francis Bell also as Prime Minister; 14–30 May 1925

Sovereign
- Monarch: HM George V
- Governor-General: HE Gen. Sir Charles Fergusson

The 21st New Zealand Parliament was a term of the New Zealand Parliament. It was elected at the 1922 general election in December of that year.

== 1922 general election ==
The 1922 general election was held on Monday, 6 December in the Māori electorates and on Tuesday, 7 December in the general electorates, respectively. A total of 80 MPs were elected; 45 represented North Island electorates, 31 represented South Island electorates, and the remaining four represented Māori electorates. 700,111 voters were enrolled and the official turnout at the election was 88.7%.

== Sessions ==
The 21st Parliament sat for four sessions (there were two sessions in 1923), and was prorogued on 14 October 1925.

Session	Opened	Adjourned
first	7 February 1923	17 February 1923
second	14 June 1923	29 August 1923
third	26 June 1924	6 November 1924
fourth	25 June 1925	1 October 1925

== Party standings ==
=== Start of Parliament ===
Party	Leader(s)	Seats at start
Reform Party	William Massey	37
Liberal Party	Thomas Wilford	22
Labour Party	Harry Holland	17
Independents		4

=== End of Parliament ===
Party	Leader(s)	Seats at end
Reform Party	Gordon Coates	37
Liberal Party	George Forbes	22
Labour Party	Harry Holland	17
Independents		4

== Ministries ==
The second Massey Ministry led by William Massey of the Reform Party had come to power in August 1919. Massey ruled until his death on 10 May 1925. Francis Bell had been acting Prime Minister during Massey's illness and took on the temporary leadership following Massey's death. Bell led the Bell Ministry from 14 to 30 May 1925, when the Reform Party elected Gordon Coates as its leader. The Coates Ministry was in place for the remainder of the parliamentary term and for the duration of the 22nd Parliament.

Reform had a narrow margin of three votes in the house if Liberal and Labour combined as they did when the house resumed in February 1923 (but Bell, Witty and Isitt voted with Massey). Hence the Government could not introduce any controversial legislation, and Massey said it was "hell most of the time".

== Initial composition of the 21st Parliament ==
The results of the 1922 election were as follows:

Key

Reform Liberal Labour Independent Liberal Independent

Electorate results for the 1922 New Zealand general election
Electorate	Incumbent	Winner	Majority	Runner up
General electorates
Ashburton	William Nosworthy		1,482	Henry Manwell Jones
Avon	Dan Sullivan		2,036	George Russell
Awarua	John Hamilton	Philip De La Perrelle	51	John Hamilton
Auckland Central	Bill Parry		1,003	Albert Glover
Auckland East	Clutha Mackenzie	John A. Lee	751	Clutha Mackenzie
Auckland West	Michael Joseph Savage		1,349	John Farrell
Bay of Islands	Vernon Reed	Allen Bell	188	Vernon Reed
Bay of Plenty	Kenneth Williams		Uncontested	
Buller	Harry Holland		1,541	John Menzies
Chalmers	James Dickson		679	Joseph Stephens
Christchurch East	Henry Thacker	Tim Armstrong	1,094	Henry Thacker
Christchurch North	Leonard Isitt		1,950	John Archer
Christchurch South	Ted Howard		3,140	H C Lane
Clutha	Alexander Malcolm	John Edie	120	Alexander Malcolm
Dunedin Central	Charles Statham		723	John Gilchrist
Dunedin North	Jim Munro		55	James Clark
Dunedin West	Thomas Sidey		1,281	John McManus
Dunedin South	William Downie Stewart		1,727	C M Moss
Eden	James Parr		675	Rex Mason
Egmont	Oswald Hawken		372	D L A Astbury
Ellesmere	Heaton Rhodes		732	J C Free
Franklin	William Massey		2,750	Joseph Rea
Grey Lynn	Fred Bartram		1,407	William John Holdsworth
Gisborne	Douglas Lysnar		500	George Wildish
Hamilton	New electorate	Alexander Young	2,043	Arthur Shapton Richards
Hawke's Bay	Hugh Campbell	Gilbert McKay	317	Andrew Hamilton Russell
Hurunui	George Forbes		1,198	S Andrew
Hutt	Thomas Wilford		802	David Pritchard
Invercargill	Josiah Hanan		993	J Armstead
Kaipara	Gordon Coates		2,464	Robert Hornblow
Kaiapoi	David Jones	David Buddo	65	David Jones
Lyttelton	James McCombs		614	Robert Macartney
Manawatu	Edward Newman	Joseph Linklater	1,505	F D Whibley
Manukau	Frederic Lang	Bill Jordan	209	Frederic Lang
Marsden	Francis Mander	Alfred Murdoch	136	William Jones
Masterton	George Sykes		556	A. C. Holmes
Mataura	George Anderson		1,041	David McDougall
Motueka	Richard Hudson		538	R Patterson
Napier	Vigor Brown	Lew McIlvride	763	John Mason
Oamaru	Ernest Lee	John MacPherson	14	Ernest Lee
Ohinemuri	Hugh Poland		939	Stephen Allen
Oroua	David Guthrie		43	John Cobbe
Nelson	Harry Atmore		2,164	Albert Gilbert
Otaki	William Hughes Field		58	G. H. M. McClure
Pahiatua	Archibald McNicol	Alfred Ransom	59	Archibald McNicol
Palmerston	Jimmy Nash		1,067	Joe Hodgens
Parnell	James Samuel Dickson		2,324	S M Wren
Patea	Edwin Dixon	James Randall Corrigan	151	Edwin Dixon
Raglan	Richard Bollard		776	S C G Lye
Rangitikei	Billy Glenn		1,007	F P Brady
Riccarton	George Witty		235	Bert Kyle
Roskill	Vivian Potter		2,007	Alfred Hall-Skelton
Rotorua	Frank Hockly		404	Cecil Clinkard
Stratford	Robert Masters		363	John Hine
Taranaki	Sydney George Smith		134	Charles Bellringer
Tauranga	William Herries		1,440	Laurence Johnstone
Temuka	Thomas Burnett		407	Thomas Herbert Langford
Thames	Thomas William Rhodes		790	W A Allan
Timaru	James Craigie	Frank Rolleston	288	Percy Vinnell
Waikato	Alexander Young	Frederick Lye	44	J T Johnson
Waimarino	Robert William Smith	Frank Langstone	887	Robert William Smith
Waipawa	George Hunter		1,076	John Joshua Langridge
Wairarapa	Alex McLeod		698	John Wiltshire Card
Waitemata	Alexander Harris		1,271	Frank Henry Burbush
Wairau	Richard McCallum	William Girling	186	Richard McCallum
Waitaki	John Bitchener			William Paul
Waitomo	William Thomas Jennings	John Rolleston	25	William Thomas Jennings
Wakatipu	James Horn		1,637	J Ritchie
Wallace	Adam Hamilton	John Charles Thomson	205	Adam Hamilton
Wanganui	Bill Veitch		1,072	John Coull
Wellington Central	Peter Fraser		4,202	William Bennett
Wellington North	John Luke		375	Harry Combs
Wellington East	Alfred Newman	Alec Monteith	473	Thomas Forsyth
Wellington South	George Mitchell	Robert McKeen	422	George Mitchell
Wellington Suburbs	Robert Wright		291	Alexander Croskery
Westland	Tom Seddon	James O'Brien	487	Tom Seddon
Māori electorates
Eastern Maori	Āpirana Ngata		1,501	Taranaki Kanara te Uamairangi
Northern Maori	Taurekareka Henare		1,441	Nau Parone Kawiti
Southern Maori	Henare Uru		87	Peter MacDonald
Western Maori	Māui Pōmare		798	Ngarangi Katitia

== By-elections during 21st Parliament ==
There were a number of changes during the term of the 21st Parliament.

Electorate and by-election		Date	Incumbent	Cause	Winner
Tauranga	1923	28 March	William Herries	Death	Charles Macmillan
Oamaru	1923	1 May	John MacPherson	Election declared void	John Macpherson
Franklin	1925	17 June	William Massey	Death	Ewen McLennan
