= 20th New Zealand Parliament =

Term of the Parliament of New Zealand

20th Parliament of New Zealand
←	19th Parliament	21st Parliament	→
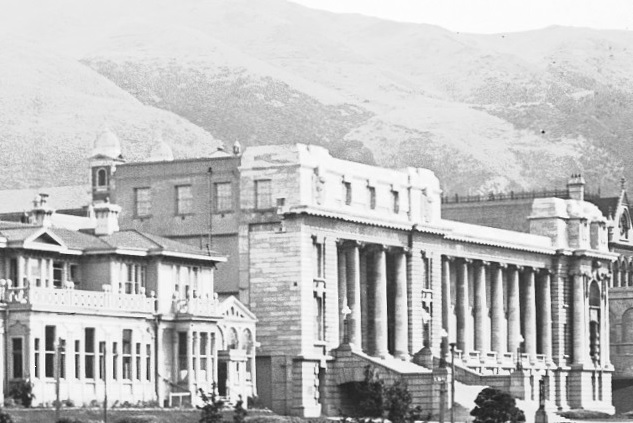
- Parliament House, Wellington

Overview
- Legislative body: New Zealand Parliament
- Term: 14 June 1920 – 31 October 1922
- Election: 1919 New Zealand general election
- Government: Reform Government

House of Representatives
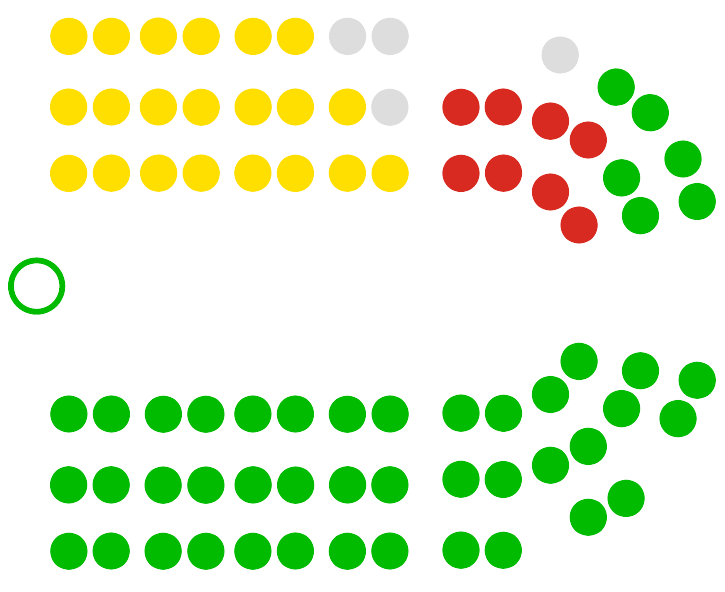
- Members: 80
- Speaker of the House: Frederic Lang
- Prime Minister: William Massey
- Leader of the Opposition: Thomas Wilford from 8 September 1920 — William MacDonald until 31 August 1920 †

Legislative Council
- Members: 43 (at start); 38 (at end)
- Speaker of the Council: Sir Walter Carncross
- Leader of the Council: Sir Francis Bell

Sovereign
- Monarch: HM George V
- Governor-General: HE Rt. Hon. The Viscount Jellicoe from 27 September 1920 — HE Rt. Hon. The Earl of Liverpool until 8 July 1920

The 20th New Zealand Parliament was a term of the New Zealand Parliament. It was elected at the 1919 general election in December of that year.

== 1919 general election ==
The 1919 general election was held on Tuesday, 16 December in the Māori electorates and on Wednesday, 17 December in the general electorates, respectively. A total of 80 MPs were elected; 45 represented North Island electorates, 31 represented South Island electorates, and the remaining four represented Māori electorates. 683,420 voters were enrolled and the official turnout at the election was 80.5%.

== Sessions ==
The 20th Parliament sat for four sessions (there were two sessions in 1921), and was prorogued on 30 November 1922.

Session	Opened	Adjourned
first	24 June 1920	11 November 1920
second	10 March 1921	22 March 1921
third	22 September 1921	11 February 1922
fourth	28 June 1922	31 October 1922

== Party standings ==
=== Start of Parliament ===
Party	Leader(s)	Seats at start
Reform Party	William Massey	47
Liberal Party	William MacDonald	21
Labour Party	Harry Holland	8
Independent		4

=== End of Parliament ===
Party	Leader(s)	Seats at end
Reform Party	William Massey	44
Liberal Party	Thomas Wilford	18
Labour Party	Harry Holland	9
Independents		7

== Ministries ==
The wartime coalition between the Reform Party and the Liberal Party had come to an end by August 1919. William Massey of the Reform Party had been the leader of the coalition, with Joseph Ward of the Liberal Party as the deputy. Ward left the coalition because it had become deeply unpopular with the population. Massey then formed the second Massey Ministry on 25 August 1919 and remained in power during the term of the 20th Parliament and beyond until his death on 10 May 1925.

== Initial composition of the 20th Parliament ==
The table below shows the results of the 1919 general election:

Key

Reform	Liberal	Labour	Liberal–Labour
Independent Liberal		Independent Labour	Independent

Electorate results for the 1919 New Zealand general election
Electorate	Incumbent	Winner	Majority	Runner up
General electorates
Ashburton	William Nosworthy		1,493	William Dickie
Auckland Central	Albert Glover	Bill Parry	786	Albert Glover
Auckland East	Arthur Myers		158	Clutha Mackenzie
Auckland West	Charles Poole	Michael Joseph Savage	533	Charles Frederick Bennett
Avon	George Russell	Dan Sullivan	1,648	George Russell
Awarua	Joseph Ward	John Hamilton	757	Joseph Ward
Bay of Islands	Vernon Reed		1,195	St. Claire Jounneaux
Bay of Plenty	William MacDonald		1,234	Kenneth Williams
Bruce	James Allen		126	John Edie
Buller	James Colvin	Harry Holland	1,003	Denis Quinlan O'Brien
Chalmers	James Dickson		883	John Gilchrist
Christchurch East	Henry Thacker		1,940	Hiram Hunter
Christchurch North	Leonard Isitt		2,403	Tim Armstrong
Christchurch South	Harry Ell	Ted Howard	1,675	Henry Holland
Clutha	Alexander Malcolm		134	Robert Alexander Rodger
Dunedin Central	Charles Statham		497	Jim Munro
Dunedin North	Andrew Walker	Edward Kellett	806	Andrew Walker
Dunedin South	Thomas Sidey		84	Tom Paul
Dunedin West	William Downie Stewart		2,421	John Arthur Brown
Eden	James Parr		1,854	Oscar McBrine
Egmont	Charles Wilkinson	Oswald Hawken	191	David Lyon Abbott Astbury
Ellesmere	Heaton Rhodes		749	George Barclay
Franklin	William Massey		3,030	Joseph Rea
Gisborne	James Carroll	Douglas Lysnar	373	James Carroll
Grey Lynn	John Payne	Fred Bartram	481	Ellen Melville
Hawke's Bay	John Findlay	Hugh Campbell	942	Gilbert McKay
Hurunui	George Forbes		667	John George Armstrong
Hutt	Thomas Wilford		1,005	David Pritchard
Invercargill	Josiah Hanan		1,403	John Archer
Kaiapoi	David Buddo	David Jones	50	David Buddo
Kaipara	Gordon Coates		3,291	Alfred Gregory
Lyttelton	James McCombs		577	Robert Macartney
Manawatu	New electorate	Edward Newman	866	Alfred Hillier
Manukau	Frederic Lang		2,508	Rex Mason
Marsden	Francis Mander		189	Alfred Murdoch
Masterton	George Sykes	George Sykes	344	A C Holms
Mataura	George Anderson		1,336	David McDougall
Motueka	Richard Hudson		661	Percy Power
Napier	Vigor Brown		54	Frederick Charles Evans
Nelson	Thomas Field	Harry Atmore	510	Thomas Field
Oamaru	Ernest Lee		276	John MacPherson
Ohinemuri	Hugh Poland		555	J Clark
Oroua	David Guthrie		1,843	E J Tunnicliffe
Otaki	William Hughes Field		1,232	James McKenzie
Pahiatua	Harold Smith	Archibald McNicol	170	Robert Ross
Palmerston	Jimmy Nash		1,004	Moses Ayrton
Parnell	James Samuel Dickson		3,419	Tom Bloodworth
Patea	George Pearce	Walter Powdrell	255	William Morrison
Raglan	Richard Bollard		988	Bill Jordan
Rangitikei	Edward Newman	Billy Glenn	635	F P Brady
Riccarton	George Witty		626	William Russell Devereux
Roskill	New electorate	Vivian Potter	1,854	James Gunson
Rotorua	New electorate	Frank Hockly	1,733	Malcolm Larney
Stratford	John Hine	Robert Masters	61	John Hine
Taranaki	Sydney George Smith	Sydney George Smith	1,023	George H. Buckeridge
Tauranga	William Herries		1,860	Benjamin Robbins
Temuka	Charles Talbot	Thomas Burnett	31	Charles Talbot
Thames	Thomas William Rhodes		1,590	W J McCormick
Timaru	James Craigie	James Craigie	1,519	Percy Vinnell
Waikato	Alexander Young		2,893	P H Watts
Waimarino	Robert William Smith		643	Frank Langstone
Waipawa	George Hunter		274	Albert Jull
Wairarapa	J. T. Marryat Hornsby	Alex McLeod	540	J. T. Marryat Hornsby
Wairau	Richard McCallum		796	B J Cooke
Waitaki	John Anstey	John Bitchener	472	John Anstey
Waitemata	Alexander Harris		1,419	Arthur Edwin Greenslade
Waitomo	New electorate	William Jennings	377	K C Wilson
Wakatipu	William Fraser	James Horn	801	Robert Scott
Wallace	John Charles Thomson	Adam Hamilton	43	John Charles Thomson
Wanganui	Bill Veitch		1,703	William J. Cuttle
Wellington Central	Peter Fraser		1,056	Frederick Pirani
Wellington East	Alfred Newman		1,058	Alec Monteith
Wellington North	John Luke		1,065	H. Oakley Browne
Wellington South	Bob Semple	George Mitchell	1,426	Bob Semple
Wellington Suburbs	Robert Wright		1,127	Alexander Croskery
Westland	Tom Seddon		1,497	James O'Brien
Māori electorates
Eastern Maori	Āpirana Ngata		Uncontested	
Northern Maori	Taurekareka Henare		1,629	Nau Parone Kawiti
Southern Maori	Hopere Uru		207	Riki te Mairaki Taiaroa
Western Maori	Māui Pōmare		1,424	Ngarangi Katitia

== By-elections during 20th Parliament ==
There were a number of changes during the term of the 20th Parliament.

Electorate and by-election		Date	Incumbent	Cause	Winner
Bruce	1920	14 April	James Allen	Resignation	John Edie
Stratford	1920	6 May	Robert Masters	Election declared void	Robert Masters
Bay of Plenty	1920	30 September	William MacDonald	Death	Kenneth Williams
Patea	1921	13 April	Walter Powdrell	Death	Edwin Dixon
Auckland East	1921	2 November	Arthur Myers	Resignation	Clutha Mackenzie
Southern Maori	1922	25 January	Hopere Uru	Death	Henare Uru
Dunedin North	1922	21 June	Edward Kellett	Death	Jim Munro
