= 1925 New Zealand general election =

- 3 (Māori) & 4 November (general) 1925

All 80 seats in the House of Representatives 41 seats were needed for a majority
- Turnout: 90.02% ▲
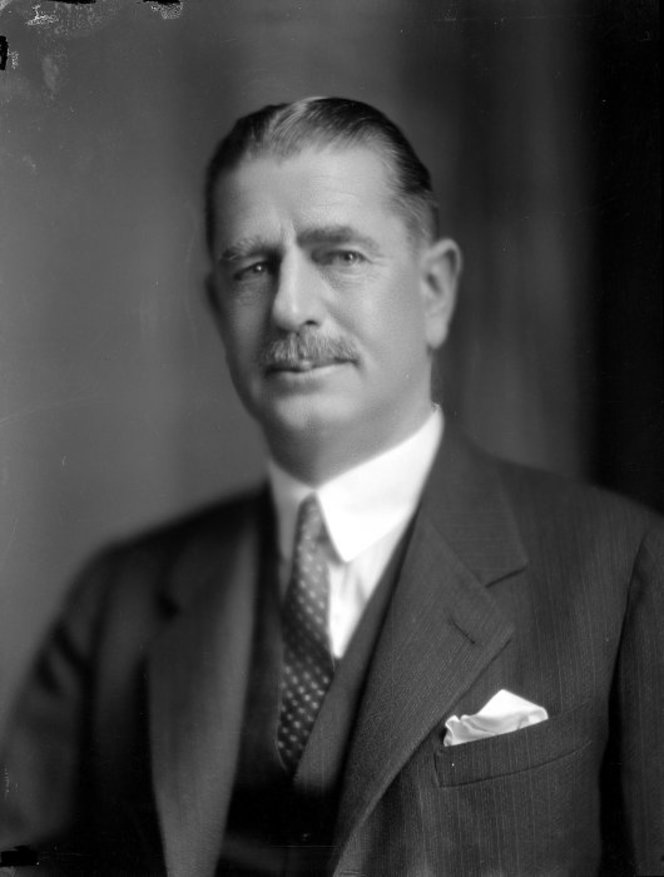

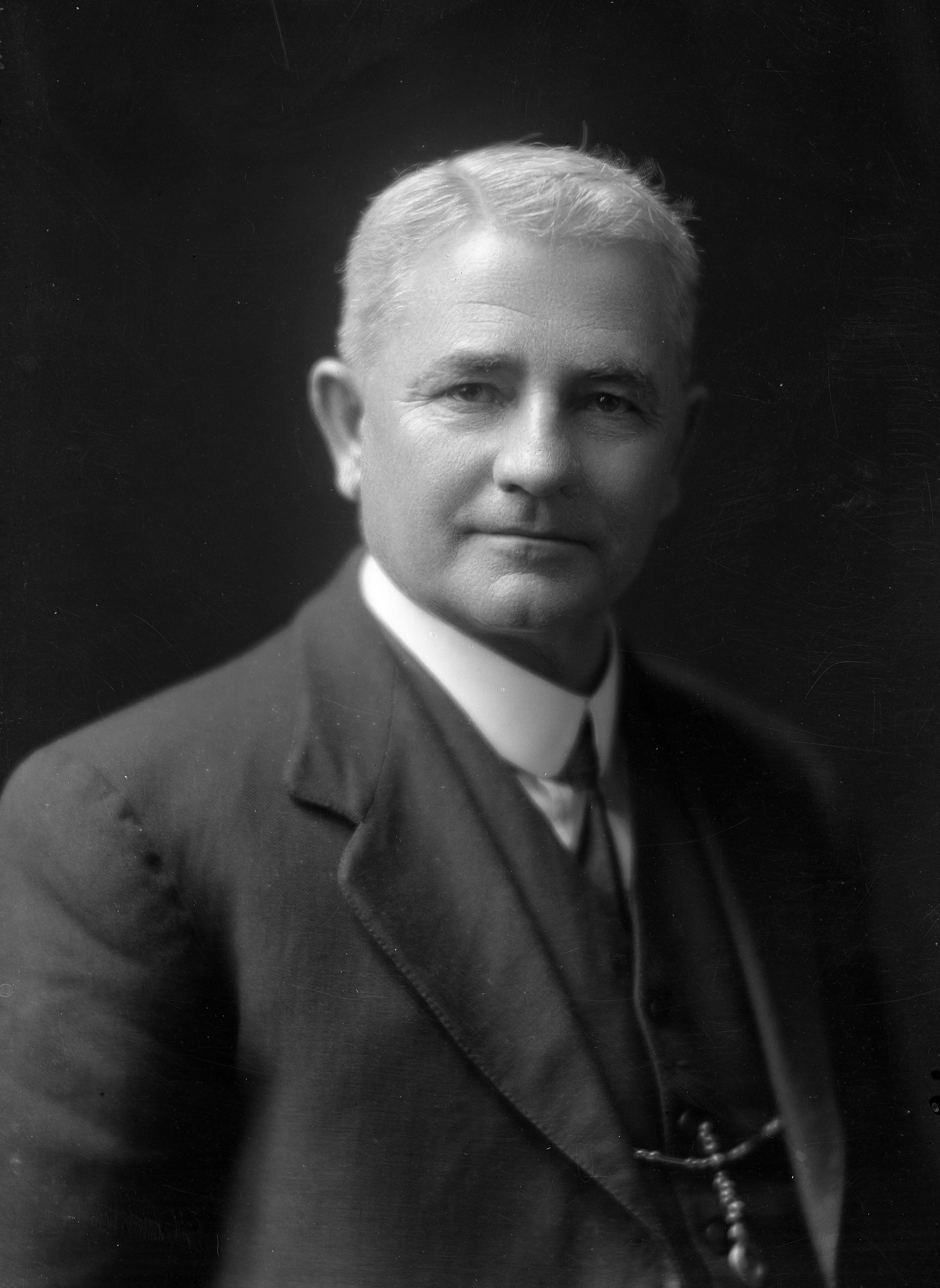

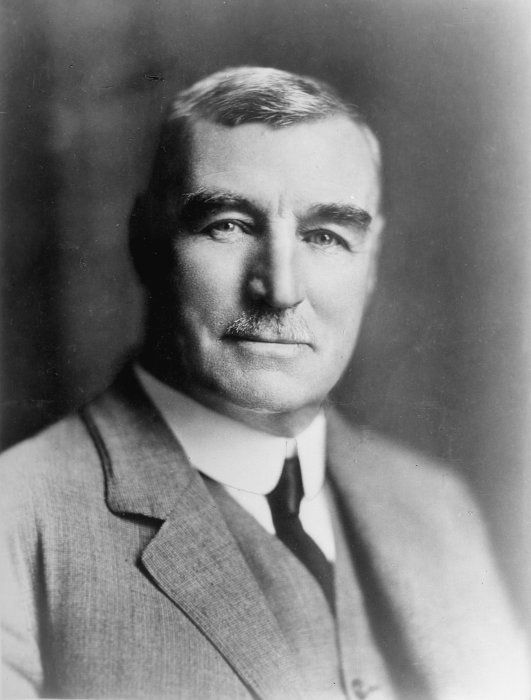
	First party	Second party	Third party
Leader	Gordon Coates	Harry Holland	George Forbes
Party	Reform	Labour	Liberal
Leader since	27 May 1925	27 August 1919	13 August 1925
Leader's seat	Kaipara	Buller	Hurunui
Last election	37 seats, 39.4%	17 seats, 23.7%	22 seats, 26.3%
Seats won	55	12	11
Seat change	▲18	▼5	▼11
Popular vote	324,239	187,610	143,931
Percentage	47.18%	27.30%	20.94%
Swing	▲8.39%	▲3.50%	▼3.81%
- Results of the election.
Prime Minister before election
Gordon Coates
Reform
Subsequent Prime Minister
Gordon Coates
Reform

The 1925 New Zealand general election was held 4 November (the Māori vote had taken place the previous day) to elect a total of 80 MPs to the 22nd session of the New Zealand Parliament.

The result was a landslide victory for the Reform Party. A total number of 678,877 (90.02%) voters turned out to vote. In one seat (Bay of Plenty) there was only one candidate.

In 1922, registration as an elector was made compulsory for all those eligible (except Māori).

== Results ==
Gordon Coates continued as Prime Minister, with his Reform Party winning an outright majority of 30. Leonard Isitt and George Witty were both appointed to the Legislative Council by Gordon Coates on 28 October 1925; shortly before the election on 4 November. Both were Liberals but their retirement removed "a source of some bitterness from the Party's ranks". Gordon Coates was Reform, and both of their former seats went to Reform candidates.

After the election both Labour and Liberals held 11 seats. A tie at 4,900 votes each in Lyttelton (between the Labour and Reform candidates) was eventually settled in Labour's favour on 13 March 1926. After winning the 15 April 1926 by-election in Eden, Labour became the official opposition.

=== Party totals ===
Election results
Party	Candidates	Total votes	Percentage	Seats won
Reform	72	324,239	47.18	55
Labour	58	187,610	27.30	12
Liberal	52	143,931	20.94	11
Country Party	5	2,398	0.35	0
Independent	10	29,107	4.24	2
Total	202	687,285		80

=== Votes summary ===
Popular Vote
Reform	47.18%
Labour	27.30%
Liberal	20.94%
Country	0.35%
Independent	4.24%

Parliament seats
Reform	68.75%
Labour	15.00%
Liberal	13.75%
Independent	2.50%

=== Electorate results ===
The election results were as follows:

Key

Reform Labour Liberal Country Party Independent Liberal Independent

Electorate results for the 1925 New Zealand general election
Electorate	Incumbent	Winner	Majority	Runner up
General electorates
Ashburton	William Nosworthy		2,117	John Nicholson Harle
Auckland Central	Bill Parry		3,500	Charles Augustus Wilson
Auckland East	John A. Lee		288	James Stewart
Auckland West	Michael Joseph Savage		476	Samuel Oldfield
Avon	Dan Sullivan		1,789	Walter Edmund Leadley
Awarua	Philip De La Perrelle	John Hamilton	220	Philip De La Perrelle
Bay of Islands	Allen Bell	Allen Bell	2,787	Hugh James Sweeney
Bay of Plenty	Kenneth Williams		Uncontested	
Buller	Harry Holland		1,532	Charles Beilby
Chalmers	James Dickson		1,593	Michael Connelly
Christchurch East	Tim Armstrong		2,855	Denis Franklyn Dennehy
Christchurch North	Leonard Isitt	Henry Holland	2,910	Henry Thacker
Christchurch South	Ted Howard		1,569	Harry Ell
Clutha	John Edie	Fred Waite	1,653	John Edie
Dunedin Central	Charles Statham		2,299	John Gilchrist
Dunedin North	Jim Munro	Harold Tapley	262	Jim Munro
Dunedin South	Thomas Sidey		2,221	John McManus
Dunedin West	William Downie Stewart		2,478	Ralph Harrison
Eden	James Parr		2,336	Rex Mason
Egmont	Oswald Hawken		1,290	Walter Green
Ellesmere	Heaton Rhodes	David Jones	634	Jeremiah Connolly
Franklin	Ewen McLennan		5,024	Donald McClymont
Gisborne	Douglas Lysnar		1,672	David Coleman
Grey Lynn	Fred Bartram		765	Ellen Melville
Hamilton	Alexander Young		4,725	Lee Martin
Hawke's Bay	Gilbert McKay	Hugh Campbell	726	Gilbert McKay
Hurunui	George Forbes		811	George Armstrong
Hutt	Thomas Wilford		1,794	Walter Nash
Invercargill	Josiah Hanan	Sir Joseph Ward	159	James Hargest
Kaiapoi	David Buddo		556	William Brock
Kaipara	Gordon Coates		4,835	Bill Barnard
Lyttelton	James McCombs (Note: Melville Lyons was elected for the Reform Party, originally the votes were equal (4900), then a recount found for Lyons. But on appeal his election was declared void on 13 March 1926, and the previous holder, James McCombs, was restored as the electorate representative.)		6	Melville Lyons
Manawatu	Joseph Linklater		2,074	Ben Roberts
Manukau	Bill Jordan		1,054	Jack Massey
Marsden	Alfred Murdoch	William Jones	651	Alfred Murdoch
Masterton	George Sykes		922	Jack Andrews
Mataura	George Anderson		2,664	William Hinchey
Motueka	Richard Hudson		2,102	Mark Fagan
Napier	Lew McIlvride	John Mason	573	Lew McIlvride
Nelson	Harry Atmore		2,349	Albert Gilbert
Oamaru	Jack MacPherson	Ernest Lee	1,097	Jack MacPherson
Ohinemuri	Hugh Poland	Albert Samuel	108	Hugh Poland
Oroua	David Guthrie	John Gordon Eliott	470	John Cobbe
Otaki	William Hughes Field		2,057	Bob Semple
Pahiatua	Alfred Ransom		113	Archibald McNicol
Palmerston	Jimmy Nash		3,240	Walter Bromley
Parnell	James Samuel Dickson		4,887	Bob Way
Patea	James Randall Corrigan	Harold Dickie	1,275	James Randall Corrigan
Raglan	Richard Bollard		2,856	Ernest Piggott
Rangitikei	Billy Glenn		1,963	Charles Joseph Duggan
Riccarton	George Witty	Bert Kyle	2,260	Winter Cole
Roskill	Vivian Potter		2,913	Alfred Hall-Skelton
Rotorua	Frank Hockly		2,776	Cecil Clinkard
Stratford	Robert Masters	Edward Walter	269	Robert Masters
Taranaki	Sydney George Smith	Charles Bellringer	50	Sydney George Smith
Tauranga	Charles Macmillan		2,310	Robert Coulter
Temuka	Thomas Burnett		535	Charles John Talbot
Thames	Thomas William Rhodes		3,307	Gladstone Willy
Timaru	Frank Rolleston		2,486	Percy Vinnell
Waikato	Frederick Lye	Stewart Reid	918	Frederick Lye
Waimarino	Frank Langstone	Robbie Smith	140	Frank Langstone
Waipawa	George Hunter		1,781	William Ashton Chambers
Wairarapa	Alex McLeod		1,424	Frank Arkle
Wairau	William Girling		1,949	Richard McCallum
Waitaki	John Bitchener		502	George Barclay
Waitemata	Alexander Harris		3,577	Arthur Osborne
Waitomo	John Rolleston		1,435	Walter Broadfoot
Wakatipu	James Horn		843	James Ritchie
Wallace	John Charles Thomson	Adam Hamilton	1,328	James Morris MacKenzie
Wanganui	Bill Veitch		891	John Coull
Wellington Central	Peter Fraser		2,390	Andrew Sloane
Wellington East	Alec Monteith	Thomas Forsyth	1,195	Alec Monteith
Wellington North	John Luke		1,946	Harry Combs
Wellington South	Robert McKeen		1,474	Archie Sievwright
Wellington Suburbs	Robert Wright		1,542	Charles Chapman
Westland	James O'Brien	Tom Seddon	12	James O'Brien
Māori electorates
Eastern Maori	Āpirana Ngata		3,604	Hone Mokena
Northern Maori	Taurekareka Henare		1,609	Hone Wi Kaitaia
Southern Maori	Henare Uru		16	Tuiti MacDonald
Western Maori	Māui Pōmare		2,723	Rangi Mawhete

Table footnotes:
