= 1922 New Zealand general election =

Election in New Zealand

- 6 (Māori) & 7 December (general) 1922

All 80 seats in the New Zealand House of Representatives 41 seats needed for a majority
- Turnout: 87.7%
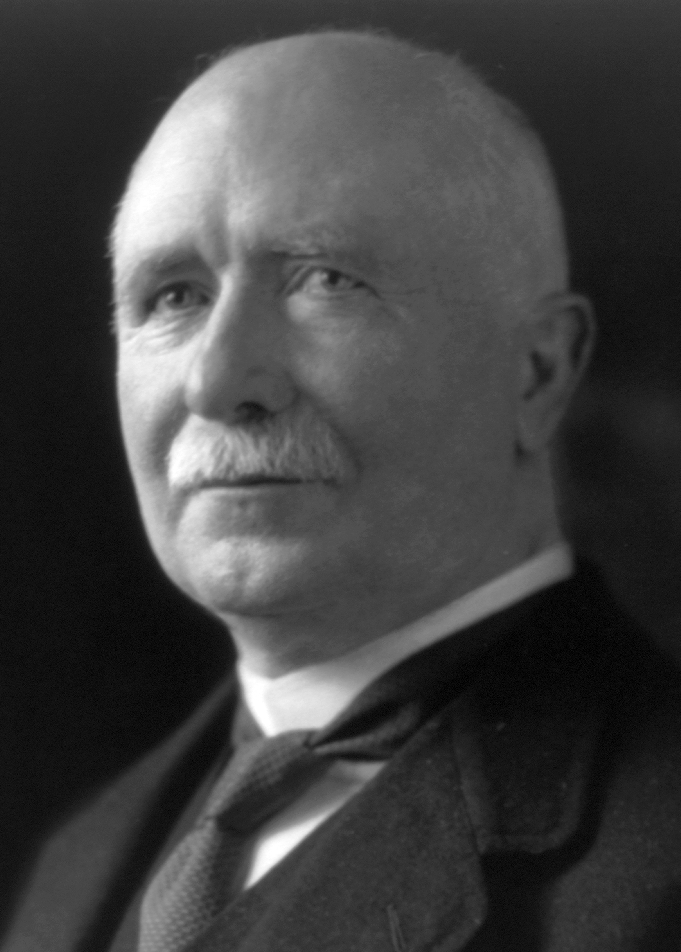

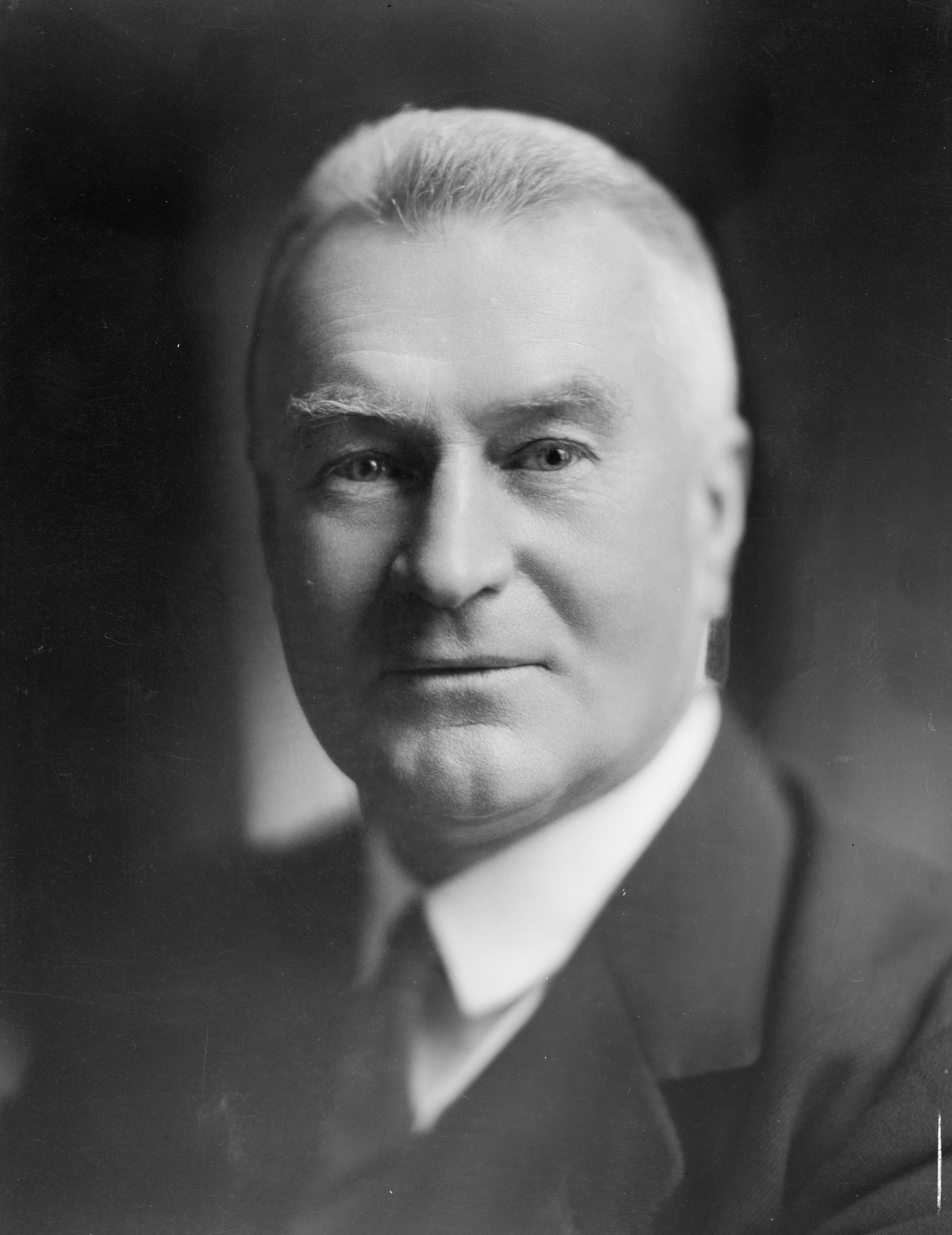

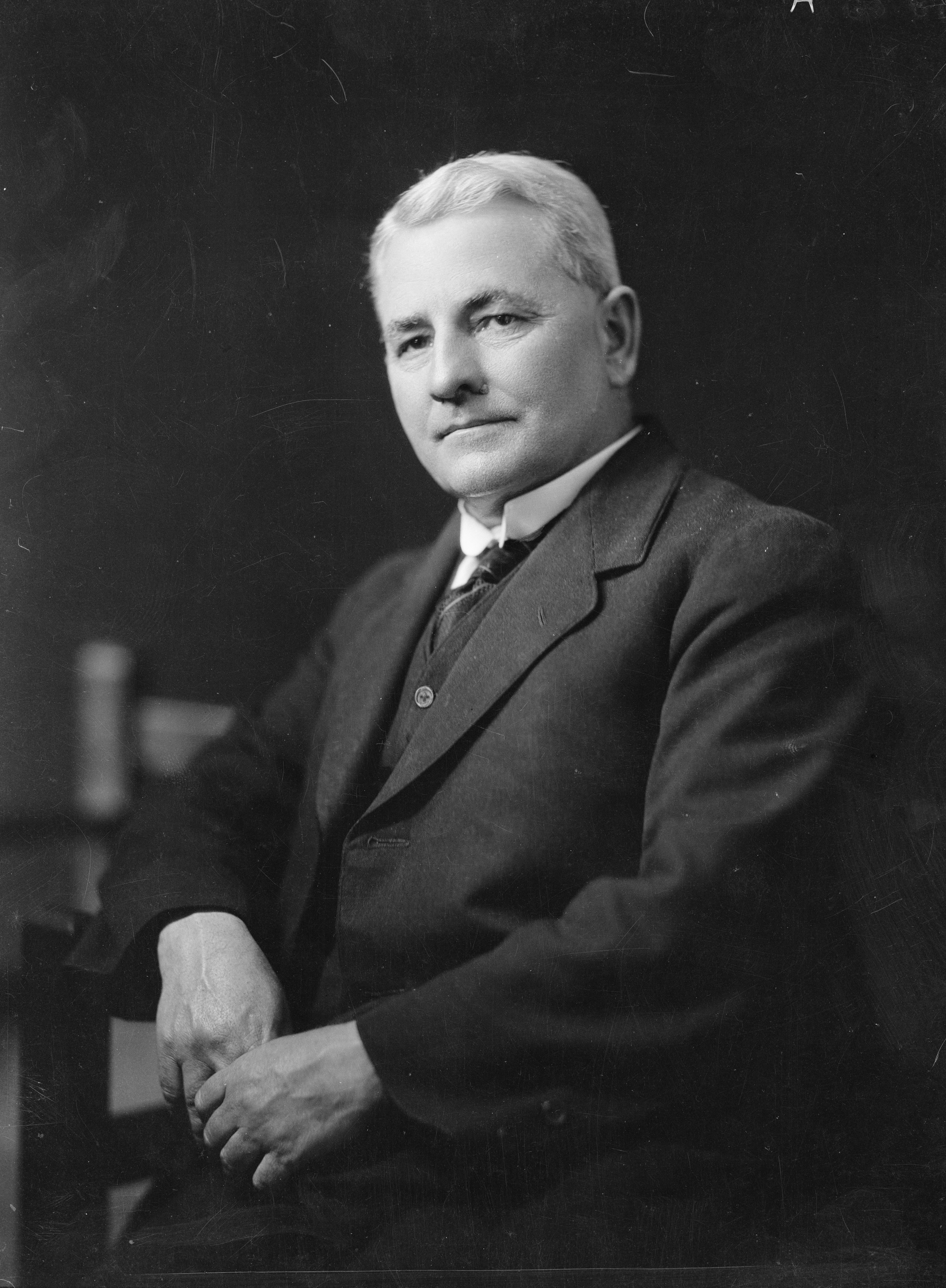
	First party	Second party	Third party
Leader	William Massey	Thomas Wilford	Harry Holland
Party	Reform	Liberal	Labour
Leader since	11 February 1909	7 September 1920	27 August 1919
Leader's seat	Franklin	Hutt	Buller
Last election	45 seats, 35.7%	19 seats, 28.7%	8 seats, 24.2%
Seats won	37	22	17
Seat change	▼8	▲3	▲9
Popular vote	249,735	166,708	150,448
Percentage	39.4%	26.3%	23.7%
Swing	▲3.7%	▼2.4%	▼0.5%
- Results of the election.
Prime Minister before election
William Massey
Reform
Subsequent Prime Minister
William Massey
Reform

The 1922 New Zealand general election was held on Monday, 6 December in the Māori electorates, and on Tuesday, 7 December in the general electorates to elect a total of 80 MPs to the 21st session of the New Zealand Parliament. A total number of 700,111 (87.7%) voters turned out to vote. In one seat (Bay of Plenty) there was only one candidate.

1922 was the year when residents of the Chatham Islands were enfranchised for the first time (included in Lyttelton and Western Māori electorates).

== Result ==
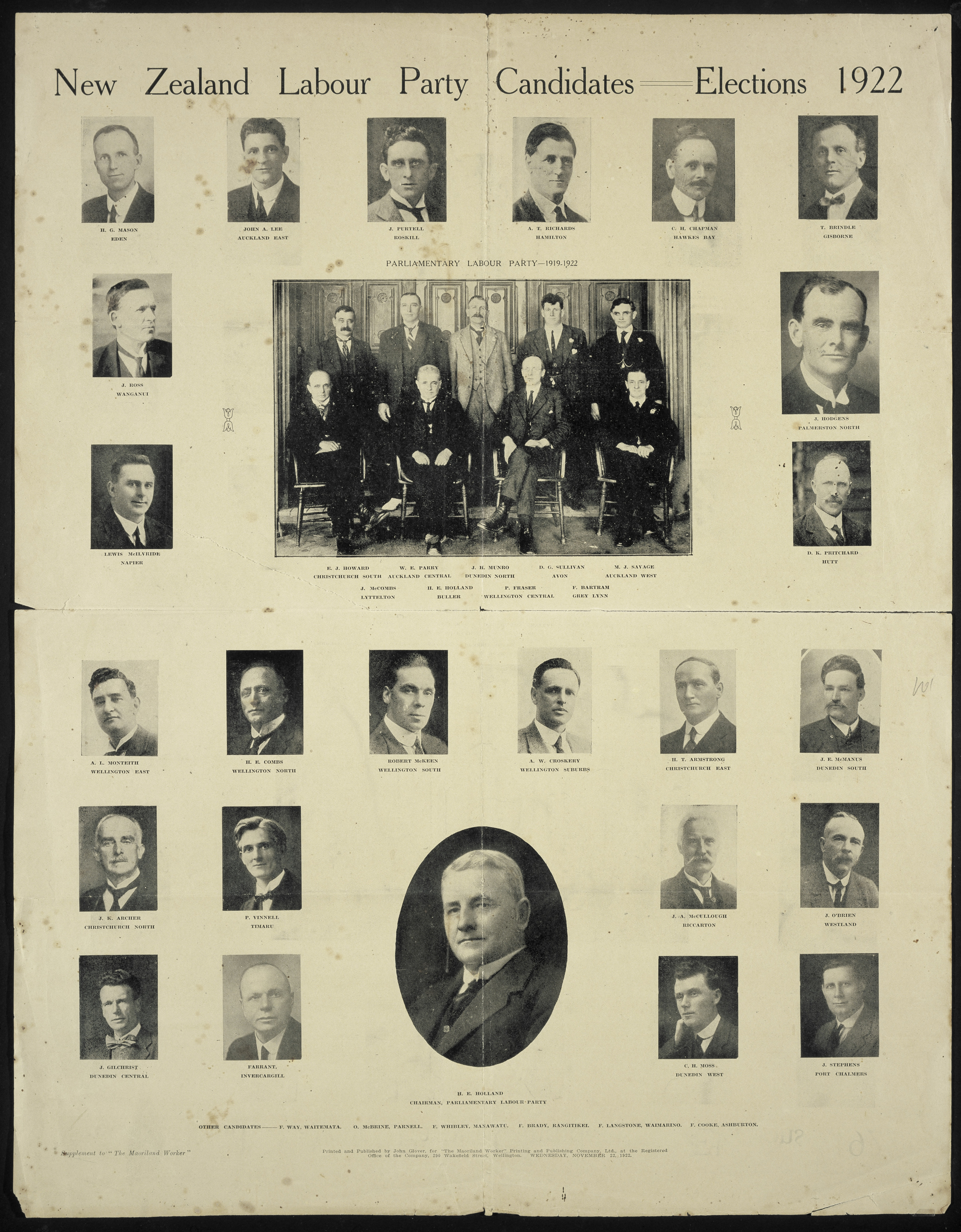
Labour Party candidates in the 1922 election

William Massey formed a government, but with the loss in support for the Reform Party he had to negotiate for support with Independents, and with two Liberal Party members.

The Liberal Party was in decline and disorganised. Just before the 1925 election (held on 4 November), two Liberal MPs from Christchurch who had supported Massey (along with Independents Harry Atmore and Allen Bell) were appointed to the Legislative Council. They were Leonard Isitt and George Witty who were both appointed to the Legislative Council by Gordon Coates on 28 October 1925. Both were Liberals and their retirement removed "a source of some bitterness from the Party’s ranks (Coates rewarded them with seats in the Legislative Council the day after the election)". Gordon Coates was Reform, and both of their seats went to Reform candidates in 1925.

== Party Totals ==
=== Party totals ===
Election results
Party	Candidates	Total votes	Percentage	Seats won
Reform Party	76	249,735	39.35	37
Liberal Party	56	166,708	26.26	22
Labour Party	41	150,448	23.70	17
Others	39	67,837	10.69	4
Total	212	634,728		80

*Note: For numbers of candidates see Wilson (1985) p. 295; for numbers of votes and percentage see Wilson (1985) p. 289. Electorate results given below include 38 Reform and 21 Liberal members. The figures given in the table agree with Mackie and Rose, as well as the article on New Zealand elections.

=== Votes summary ===
Popular Vote
Reform	39.35%
Liberal	26.26%
Labour	23.70%
Others	10.69%

Parliament seats
Reform	46.25%
Liberal	27.50%
Labour	21.25%
Others	5.00%

== Electorate results ==
The results of the 1922 election were as follows:

Key

Reform Liberal Labour Independent Liberal Independent

Electorate results for the 1922 New Zealand general election
Electorate	Incumbent	Winner	Majority	Runner up
General electorates
Ashburton	William Nosworthy		1,482	Henry Manwell Jones
Avon	Dan Sullivan		2,036	George Russell
Awarua	John Hamilton	Philip De La Perrelle	51	John Hamilton
Auckland Central	Bill Parry		1,003	Albert Glover
Auckland East	Clutha Mackenzie	John A. Lee	751	Clutha Mackenzie
Auckland West	Michael Joseph Savage		1,349	John Farrell
Bay of Islands	Vernon Reed	Allen Bell	188	Vernon Reed
Bay of Plenty	Kenneth Williams		Uncontested	
Buller	Harry Holland		1,541	John Menzies
Chalmers	James Dickson		679	Joseph Stephens
Christchurch East	Henry Thacker	Tim Armstrong	1,094	Henry Thacker
Christchurch North	Leonard Isitt		1,950	John Archer
Christchurch South	Ted Howard		3,140	Henry Christopher Lane
Clutha	Alexander Malcolm	John Edie	120	Alexander Malcolm
Dunedin Central	Charles Statham		723	John Gilchrist
Dunedin North	Jim Munro		55	James Clark
Dunedin West	Thomas Sidey		1,281	John McManus
Dunedin South	William Downie Stewart		1,727	Cornelius Moss
Eden	James Parr		675	Rex Mason
Egmont	Oswald Hawken		372	David Astbury
Ellesmere	Heaton Rhodes		732	James Charles Free
Franklin	William Massey		2,750	Joseph Rea
Grey Lynn	Fred Bartram		1,407	William John Holdsworth
Gisborne	Douglas Lysnar		500	George Wildish
Hamilton	New electorate	Alexander Young	2,043	Arthur Shapton Richards
Hawke's Bay	Hugh Campbell	Gilbert McKay	317	Andrew Hamilton Russell
Hurunui	George Forbes		1,198	Samuel Andrew
Hutt	Thomas Wilford		802	David Pritchard
Invercargill	Josiah Hanan		993	James Armstead
Kaipara	Gordon Coates		2,464	Robert Hornblow
Kaiapoi	David Jones	David Buddo	65	David Jones
Lyttelton	James McCombs		614	Robert Macartney
Manawatu	Edward Newman	Joseph Linklater	1,505	Frank Whibley
Manukau	Frederic Lang	Bill Jordan	209	Frederic Lang
Marsden	Francis Mander	Alfred Murdoch	136	William Jones
Masterton	George Sykes		556	Archibald Holms
Mataura	George Anderson		1,041	David McDougall
Motueka	Richard Hudson		538	Robert Patterson
Napier	Vigor Brown	Lew McIlvride	763	John Mason
Oamaru	Ernest Lee	Jack MacPherson	14	Ernest Lee
Ohinemuri	Hugh Poland		939	Stephen Allen
Oroua	David Guthrie		43	John Cobbe
Nelson	Harry Atmore		2,164	Albert Gilbert
Otaki	William Hughes Field		58	Gordon McClure
Pahiatua	Archibald McNicol	Alfred Ransom	59	Archibald McNicol
Palmerston	Jimmy Nash		1,067	Joe Hodgens
Parnell	James Samuel Dickson		2,324	Sidney Wren
Patea	Edwin Dixon	James Randall Corrigan	151	Edwin Dixon
Raglan	Richard Bollard		776	Samuel Lye
Rangitikei	Billy Glenn		1,007	Francis Patrick Brady
Riccarton	George Witty		235	Bert Kyle
Roskill	Vivian Potter		2,007	Alfred Hall-Skelton
Rotorua	Frank Hockly		404	Cecil Clinkard
Stratford	Robert Masters		363	John Hine
Taranaki	Sydney George Smith		134	Charles Bellringer
Tauranga	William Herries		1,440	Laurence Johnstone
Temuka	Thomas Burnett		407	Bert Langford
Thames	Thomas William Rhodes		790	William Allan
Timaru	James Craigie	Frank Rolleston	288	Percy Vinnell
Waikato	Alexander Young	Frederick Lye	44	John Thomas Johnson
Waimarino	Robbie Smith	Frank Langstone	887	Robbie Smith
Waipawa	George Hunter		1,076	John Langridge
Wairarapa	Alex McLeod		698	John Wiltshire Card
Waitemata	Alexander Harris		1,271	Frank Henry Burbush
Wairau	Richard McCallum	William Girling	186	Richard McCallum
Waitaki	John Bitchener			William Paul
Waitomo	Bill Jennings	John Rolleston	25	Bill Jennings
Wakatipu	James Horn		1,637	James Ritchie
Wallace	Adam Hamilton	John Charles Thomson	205	Adam Hamilton
Wanganui	Bill Veitch		1,072	John Coull
Wellington Central	Peter Fraser		4,202	William Bennett
Wellington North	John Luke		375	Harry Combs
Wellington East	Alfred Newman	Alec Monteith	473	Thomas Forsyth
Wellington South	George Mitchell	Robert McKeen	422	George Mitchell
Wellington Suburbs	Robert Wright		291	Alexander Croskery
Westland	Tom Seddon	James O'Brien	487	Tom Seddon
Māori electorates
Eastern Maori	Āpirana Ngata		1,501	Taranaki Kanara te Uamairangi
Northern Maori	Taurekareka Henare		1,441	Nau Parone Kawiti
Southern Maori	Henare Uru		87	Peter MacDonald
Western Maori	Māui Pōmare		798	Ngarangi Katitia

== Summary of changes ==
A boundary redistribution resulted in the abolition of one seat:

- Bruce, held by John Edie

At the same time, one new seat was created:

- Hamilton

== Citations ==
- Bassett, Michael (1982). Three Party Politics in New Zealand 1911–1931. Auckland: Historical Publications. ISBN 0-86870-006-1.
- Chapman, Robert M. (1948). The Significance of the 1928 General Election: A Study in Certain Trends in New Zealand Politics During the Nineteen-Twenties (Thesis). Massey University.
- Chapman, Robert M. (1969). The Political Scene 1919–1931. Heinemann.
- Hislop, J. (1923). The General Election, 1922. Government Printer.
- Mackie, Thomas T.; Rose, Richard (1991). The International Almanac of Electoral History (3rd ed.). Macmillan.
- McRobie, Alan (1989). Electoral Atlas of New Zealand. Wellington: GP Books. ISBN 0-477-01384-8.
- Wilson, Jim (1985) [First published in 1913]. New Zealand Parliamentary Record, 1840–1984 (4th ed.). Wellington: V.R. Ward, Govt. Printer. OCLC 154283103.
