= 1925 New Zealand Liberal Party leadership election =

Election in New Zealand

- 13 August 1925
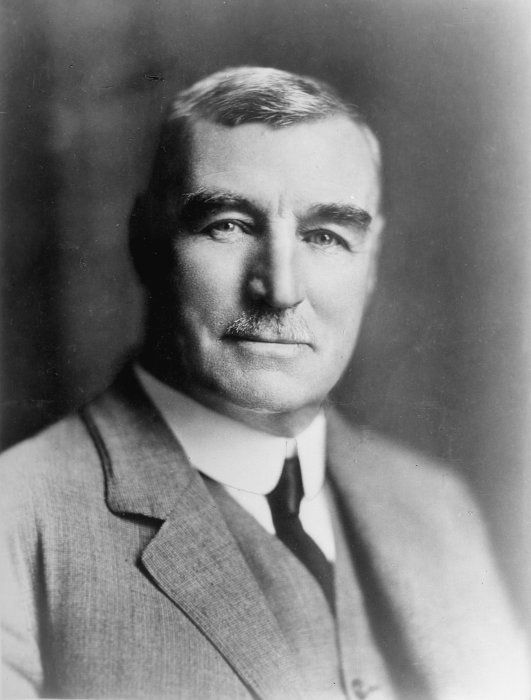

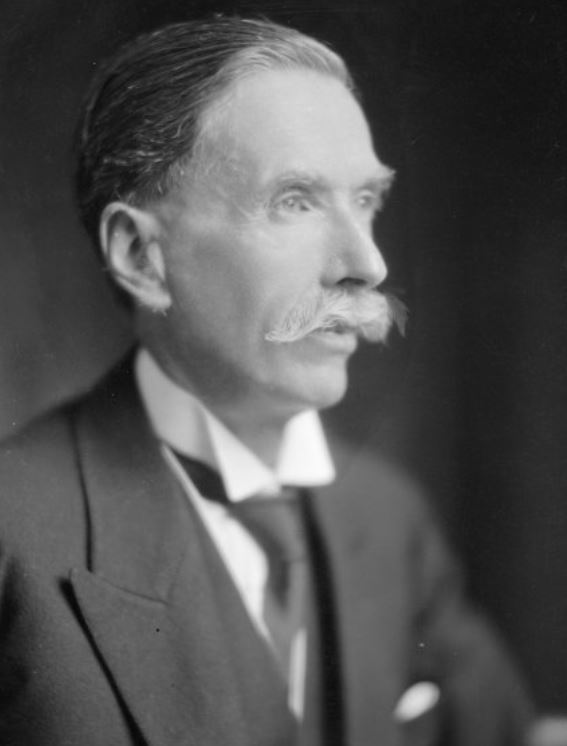
Candidate	George Forbes	Thomas Sidey
Popular vote	≥12	<12
Leader before election
Thomas Wilford
Leader after election
George Forbes

An election for the leadership of the New Zealand Liberal Party was held on 13 August 1925 to choose the next leader of the party. The election was won by Hurunui MP and former senior whip George Forbes.

== Background ==
Thomas Wilford had been elected party leader in September 1920. He presided over a period of continued decline for the Liberal Party. There were internal divisions that emerged with a small band of Liberal MPs who did not accept Wilford as their leader and preferred the party to remain leaderless until Ward could re-enter Parliament. Wilford had reconciled with these members over the next year and led the party at the 1922 general election, gaining three seats. With the indecisive result of the 1922 election Wilford attempted to merged the Liberal and Reform parties, but this was rejected by the Reform party. Wilford attempted a rebrand of his party adding the word "National" to its name. Soon after he resigned the leadership for health reasons in August 1925 so he could travel to England for medical treatment.

== Candidates ==
Two candidates were identified as possible replacement leaders to Wilford. George Forbes was seen as the most likely successor, but Thomas Sidey was also thought to have had strong claims to the leadership.

George Forbes
Forbes had been the MP for Hurunui since 1908 and was Senior Whip of the Liberal Party from 1912 to 1923. He, rather than Wilford, had led the Liberal Party's delegation to a joint conference with the Reform Party in June 1926, but had been rebuffed by Reform leader Gordon Coates. Popular with his constituents even they hitherto had not considered him likely to ever lead the party. Like wise he was not known very well in the North Island.

Thomas Sidey
Sidey had been an MP since 1901 for the Caversham and then Dunedin South electorates. Despite having been passed over more than once for a cabinet position previously, by the 1920s he was seen as a senior member in the reduced strength Liberal Party. His stint as deputy leader of the party under Wilford was his strongest claim to the leadership. While respected for his length of service and believed by observers to have many of the required characteristics for the leadership, he was not considered a particularly talented parliamentary debater, a defect that outweighed his more desirable qualities.

== Result ==
A caucus meeting in the evening of 13 August 1925. Wilford tendered his resignation which was accepted by the caucus with regret. Forbes was then elected as leader by the caucus at the same meeting. No announcement was made of this decision and the outcome only became known when MPs took their seats whence Forbes occupied the frontbench seat that was allocated to the Leader of the Opposition.

== Aftermath ==
Forbes led the party to a disastrous result at the 1925 general election, losing eleven seats while Reform totaled fifty-five. As Forbes was still not well known outside the South Island the Liberal campaign in the North Island had been run by Wanganui MP Bill Veitch. Shortly afterwards, Forbes even lost his status as Leader of the Opposition as the Labour Party had more parliamentary seats than the Liberals, enabling Labour leader Harry Holland to claim the title. By 1927, Veitch began working with Albert Davy, a former Reform Party organiser to rebrand the Liberal Party, later becoming the United Party. Forbes remained leader until he made way for former Prime Minister Sir Joseph Ward to become the new party's leader in 1928, with Forbes becoming a co-deputy leader.
