= 1921 Patea by-election =

New Zealand by-election

- 13 April 1921
- Turnout: 5,481
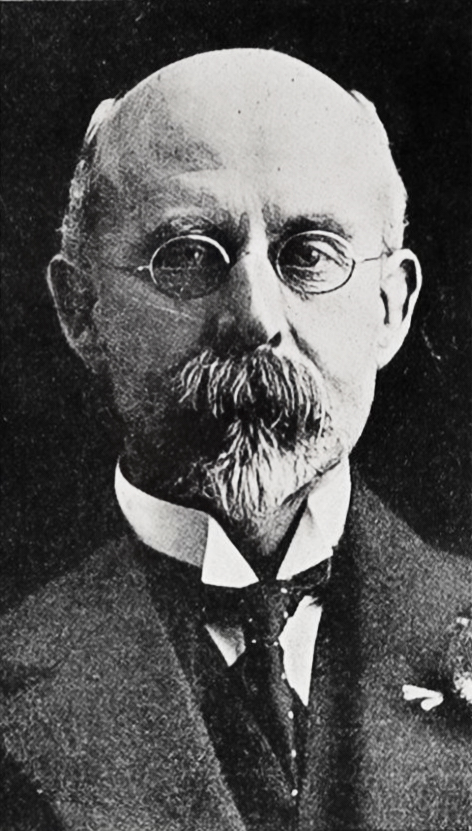

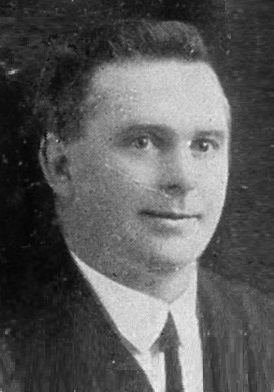
Candidate	Edwin Dixon	William Morrison	Lew McIlvride
Party	Reform	Liberal	Labour
Popular vote	2,620	2,315	546
Member before election
Walter Powdrell
Reform
Elected Member
Edwin Dixon
Reform

The Patea by-election was a by-election in the New Zealand electorate of Patea, a rural seat on the west coast of the North Island.

== Background ==
The by-election was held on 13 April 1921, and was precipitated by the resignation of sitting Reform member of parliament, Walter Powdrell. The Reform Party chose Edwin Dixon, the Mayor of Hawera, as their official candidate, and apparently Clutha Mackenzie was their second preference. Earlier, Thomas William McDonald announced his intention to stand for the Reform Party. However, he left without contesting the by-election.

Labour candidate Lew McIlvride polled a small vote compared to Dixon and Morrison. However, he was the only one of the three candidates who increased the vote for his party compared with 1919 and was rewarded with contesting a winnable seat in 1922 in Napier, which he won.

== Result ==
The following table gives the election results:

1921 Patea by-election
Party	Candidate	Votes	%	±%
Reform	Edwin Dixon	2,620	47.80	
Liberal	William Morrison	2,315	42.23	−24.37
Labour	Lew McIlvride	546	9.96	
Majority		305	5.56	
Turnout		5,481		
