= Harold Dickie =

New Zealand politician (1874–1954)

The Honourable Harold Dickie OBE
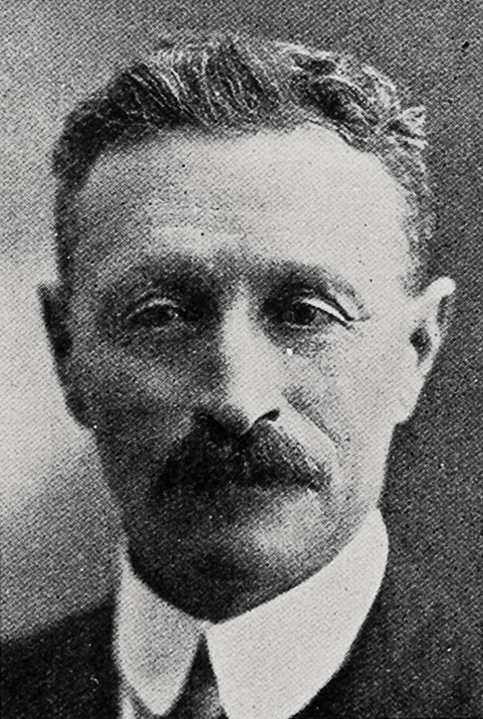
- Dickie in 1928

Member of the New Zealand Legislative Council
- In office 22 June 1950 – 31 December 1950

Personal details
- Born: Harold Galt Dickie; 1874 Waverley, New Zealand
- Died: 15 August 1954 (aged 80) New Plymouth, New Zealand
- Spouse: Florence Mildred Law (m. 1943)

Harold Galt Dickie OBE (1874 – 15 August 1954) was a New Zealand politician of the Reform Party and from 1936 of the National Party.

== Biography ==
New Zealand Parliament
Years	Term	Electorate	Party
1925–1928	22nd	Patea	Reform
1928–1931	23rd	Patea	Reform
1931–1935	24th	Patea	Reform
1935–1936	25th	Patea	Reform
1936–1938	Changed allegiance to:		National
1938–1943	26th	Patea	National

Dickie was born at Waverley, Taranaki in 1874. He attended the local school and farmed in the area until World War I, when he joined the New Zealand Expeditionary Force. After the war, he was instrumental in the development of the bobby calf industry.

He represented the Patea electorate in Parliament from 1925 to 1943, when he retired.

In 1950 he was appointed to the Legislative Council by National, as a member of the so-called suicide squad charged with voting for the abolition of the council (or Upper House).

In 1935, Dickie was awarded the King George V Silver Jubilee Medal. He was appointed an Officer of the Order of the British Empire, for public and local government services, in the 1953 New Year Honours. The investiture was held almost a year later, on 29 December 1953, at the Auckland Town Hall and the honour was conferred by the Elizabeth II as part of her (and the Duke's) royal visit to New Zealand in 1953/54.

In July or early August 1943, Dickie married Florence Mildred Law (née Dixon) in Rotorua. At that time, Dickie had already announced his retirement from parliament and at the end of the session later in the year, the couple moved to Rotorua. His wife's late husband had been a bank manager and they had lived in Waverley for some time from where she knew Dickie. He died in New Plymouth on 15 August 1954 aged 80.

== Notes ==
New Zealand Parliament
Preceded by James Randall Corrigan	Member of Parliament for Patea; 1925–1943	Succeeded by William Sheat
