= Edwin Dixon =

New Zealand politician

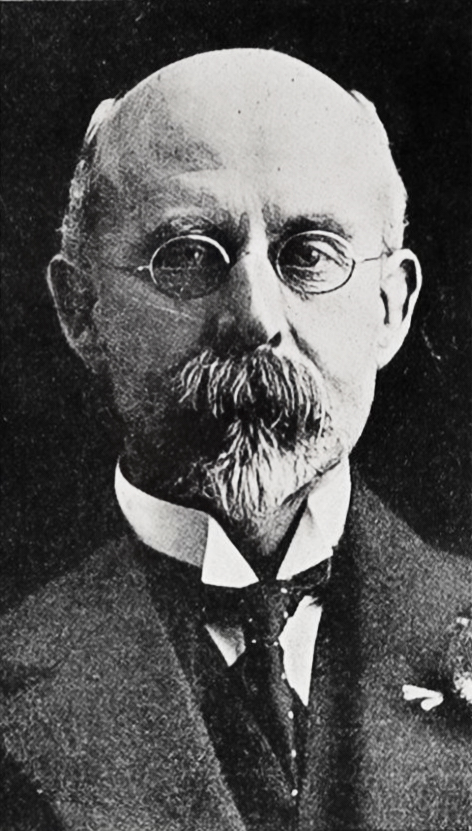

Mayor of Hawera
- In office 1915–1923

Member of the New Zealand Parliament for Patea
- In office 1921–1922
- Preceded by: Walter Powdrell
- Succeeded by: James Randall Corrigan

Personal details
- Born: 13 March 1867 Wellington, New Zealand
- Died: 26 July 1955 (aged 88) Hāwera, New Zealand
- Spouse: Elizabeth Ann Nicholson (m. 1892; died 1944)
- Children: 4
- Occupation: Music retailer
- Awards: Queen Elizabeth II Coronation Medal (1953)

Edwin Dixon (1867–1955) was a New Zealand politician and music retailer. He served as the Reform Party Member of Parliament for Patea from 1921 to 1922, and was mayor of Hāwera from 1915 to 1923.

== Early life and family ==
Born in Wellington on 13 March 1867, Dixon was the son of Joe and Rosina Hannah Dixon. He was educated in Wellington and after leaving school worked in the confectionery business for eight years. After moving to Palmerston North, he was employed by Grace, Clark and Company, a firm that sold pianos, musical instruments and music. On 17 February 1892, Dixon married Elizabeth Ann Nicholson at the Broad Street Methodist Church in Palmerston North, and the couple went on to have four daughters. In about 1902, Dixon moved to Hāwera as branch manager for Grace, Clark and Company, before taking over the branch on his own account and going into partnership with Charles Alfred Bates.

== Political career ==
New Zealand Parliament
Years	Term	Electorate	Party
1921–1922	20th	Patea	Reform

Dixon served as mayor of Hāwera from 1915 to 1923.

He won the Patea electorate representing the Reform Party in a 1921 by-election after the death of the previous MP, Walter Powdrell, but was defeated in the 1922 general election.

== Later life ==
Dixon's wife, Elizabeth Dixon, died in 1944. In 1953, Dixon was awarded the Queen Elizabeth II Coronation Medal. He died two years later, on 26 July 1955, at the age of 88, and was buried at Hāwera Cemetery.
