= Stewart Reid =

New Zealand politician (1867–1952)

Daniel Stewart Reid
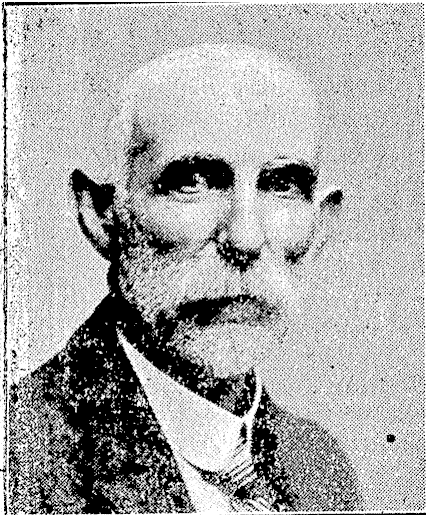

Member of the New Zealand Parliament for Waikato
- In office 4 November 1925 – 18 October 1928
- Preceded by: Frederick Lye
- Succeeded by: Frederick Lye

Member of the New Zealand Parliament for Raglan
- In office 2 December 1931 – 1 November 1935
- Preceded by: Lee Martin
- Succeeded by: Lee Martin

Personal details
- Born: 30 October 1867 Drury, New Zealand
- Died: 6 May 1952 (aged 84)
- Party: Reform Party

Daniel Stewart Reid (30 October 1867 – 6 May 1952) was a New Zealand politician of the Reform Party.

== Early life ==
Reid was born in Drury in 1867, some distance south of Auckland. His parent had arrived in New Zealand from Argyllshire in Scotland in circa 1865. His parents were Margaret and Walter Reid, but his father's obituary published in the Auckland Star in July 1925 erroneously talks of Andrew Reid. The family lived in Drury, and then in Wairoa in the Hawke's Bay Region.

From approximately age eight, Reid lived at Tuhikaramea near present-day Temple View in the Waipa District. He married Margaret Donnet Hodgson on 8 April 1897.

== Political career ==
New Zealand Parliament
Years	Term	Electorate	Party
1925–1928	22nd	Waikato	Reform
1931–1935	24th	Raglan	Reform

Reid was involved in local affairs and served as chairman of the Waipa County Council, as a member of the Tuhikaramea Road Board and school committees, and as a member of the No. 2 District Highways Board and the Central Electric Power board. When the Rural Counties' Association formed in 1925, Reid was elected onto the provisional executive.

Reid was chosen as the official candidate for the Reform Party in early September 1925 for the Waikato electorate. In the 1925 election, Reid successfully challenged the incumbent, Frederick Lye of the Liberal Party. At the next election in 1928, Lye in turn defeated him. He then defeated Lee Martin of the Labour Party for the Raglan electorate in 1931, but lost Raglan to Martin with the landslide to Labour in 1935.

== Later life and death ==
In 1935, he was awarded the King George V Silver Jubilee Medal. Reid died on 6 May 1952 and was buried at Paterangi Cemetery. His wife died in July 1959 and was buried in the same grave.

New Zealand Parliament
Preceded by Frederick Lye	Member of Parliament for Waikato; 1925–1928	Succeeded by Frederick Lye
Preceded by Lee Martin	Member of Parliament for Raglan; 1931–1935	Succeeded by Lee Martin
