= James Dickson (New Zealand politician) =

New Zealand politician

New Zealand Parliament
Years	Term	Electorate	Party
1914–1919	19th	Chalmers	Reform
1919–1922	20th	Chalmers	Reform
1922–1925	21st	Chalmers	Reform
1925–1928	22nd	Chalmers	Reform

James McColl Dickson (1854 – 16 March 1937) was a Reform Party Member of Parliament in New Zealand.

Dickson was born in Victoria in 1854. He came to Otago as a nine-year-old and continued his schooling there. Together with his brother, he was for many years a sawmiller. He then had a farm at Portobello for the next 40 years breeding stock.

Dickson was a member of the Portobello School Committee. In 1911, he was voted onto the Otago Harbour Board and served for three terms as chairman. He first stood for Parliament in the 1911 election in the Chalmers electorate but missed out to reach the second ballot by less than 100 votes. He won the Chalmers electorate in the 1914 general election, and held it to 1928, when he retired.

Dickson's wife died before him. Dickson lived at his son-in-law's place in the Dunedin suburb of Roslyn when he died on 16 March 1937. He was survived by three sons and two daughters.

New Zealand Parliament
Preceded by Edward Clark	Member of Parliament for Chalmers; 1914–1928	Succeeded by Alfred Ansell
