= Vivian Potter =

New Zealand politician

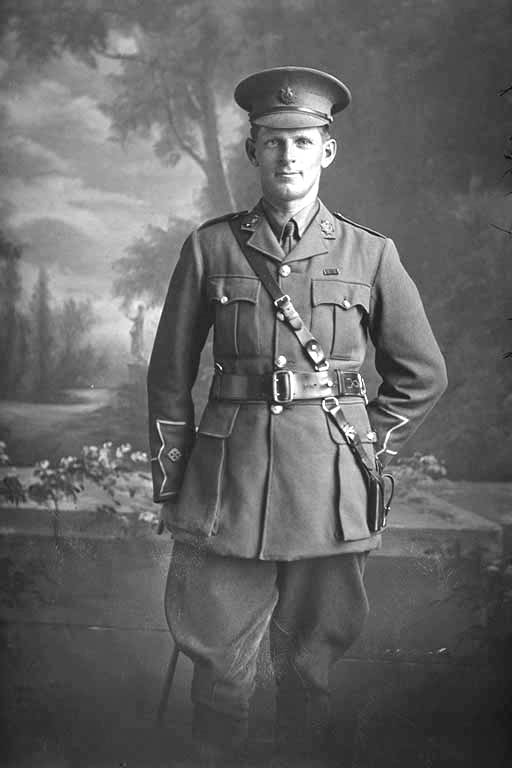
2nd Lieutenant Vivian Potter of the New Zealand Army Service Corps wearing campaign medals in 1916

Vivian Harold Potter (23 October 1878 – 19 November 1968) was a New Zealand Member of Parliament, miner, trade unionist, and soldier.

== Private life ==
Potter was born in Hamilton in 1878, the son of Albert Potter. His mother was Catherine Potter (née Whitehouse), Albert Potter's second wife. Albert Potter left his first wife in 1862 in Hobart when he discovered that both she and Catherine Whitehouse were pregnant with his children; he secretly took four of their five children with them to Auckland. His first wife tracked him down in Mount Eden in 1892.

Vivian Potter mostly lived in Auckland during his early life. He fought in the Second Boer War with the 7th Contingent for about two years; he was a Squadron Quartermaster Sergeant with registration number 4045.

After the Boer War, he married Lillah Coleman at Waihi in January 1904. He was a miner at Waihi and was a member of the Waihi Miners' Union, but opposed the 1912 strike. After the strike was over, he travelled the North Island and lectured on labour arbitration and conciliation.

He was a second lieutenant in World War I. He was granted indefinite leave from military service in March 1918 because he suffered from sciatica.

== Political career ==
New Zealand Parliament
Years	Term	Electorate	Party
1919–1922	20th	Roskill	Reform
1922–1925	21st	Roskill	Reform
1925–1928	22nd	Roskill	Reform

Potter served on the Waihi Borough Council. He chaired the Waihi school committee for some time, and was on the advisory committee for the Technical School.

Potter represented the Roskill electorate for the Reform Party in the New Zealand House of Representatives from 1919 to 1928. In the 1928 election, Potter stood in the Eden electorate for the Reform Party but was beaten by Arthur Stallworthy. In the 1931 election, he was one of five candidates in Eden and came last. In the 1935 election, he stood in Roskill electorate again, and came fourth of the five candidates.

He died on 19 November 1968 and was buried at Māngere Lawn Cemetery.

New Zealand Parliament
New constituency	Member of Parliament for Roskill; 1919–1928	Succeeded by George Munns
