= Billy Glenn =

NZ international rugby union player

Billy Glenn MC
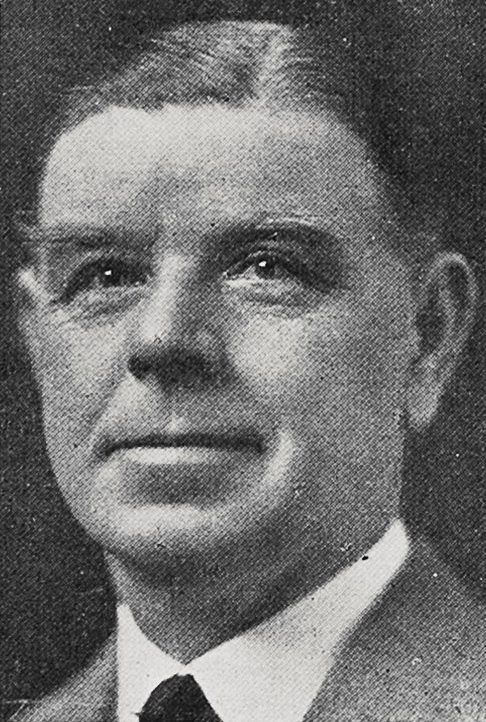
- Born: William Spiers Glenn; 21 February 1877 Greymouth, New Zealand
- Died: 5 October 1953 (aged 76)
- Height: 1.80 m (5 ft 11 in)
- Weight: 82 kg (181 lb)
- School: Manaia School, Taranaki
- Occupation: Farmer

Rugby union career
- Position: Loose forward
Provincial / State sides
Years	Team	Apps	(Points)
1898, 1900–05, 12	Taranaki	20	
International career
Years	Team	Apps	(Points)
1904–06	New Zealand	2	(0)

William Spiers Glenn MC (21 February 1877 – 5 October 1953) was a New Zealand rugby union player who played for the All Blacks on their 1905 tour. He later became a Reform Party Member of Parliament in New Zealand.

== Early life ==
Glenn was born in Greymouth in 1877 and moved to Manaia, Taranaki, with his family as a child. He was a keen sportsman, and as well as playing rugby, he became secretary of the Manaia Tennis Club. He was a member of the Egmont Racing Club and owned several race horses.

In 1904, Glenn was elected a member of the Manaia Town Board. He owned a 142-hectare (350-acre) dairy farm on the Waimate plain.

== Rugby union career ==
Glenn was a loose forward, and occasionally played at hooker. He became a Taranaki rugby representative in 1899. He made his All Blacks debut in 1904, playing against the touring British Isles team. He subsequently toured with the 1905 Originals. In all, Glenn played 19 matches for the All Blacks, including two test matches. He scored no points and never played in a losing All Blacks side.

== Military service ==
In World War I, Glenn served with the Royal Field Artillery, reaching the rank of second lieutenant. In 1916, he was awarded the Military Cross for conspicuous gallantry and ability as an observing officer. His citation reads that "he was exposed to heavy shell fire for several hours, but with great coolness and judgment corrected the fire of his battery throughout, and sent back constant reports on the situation."

== Parliamentary career ==
New Zealand Parliament
Years	Term	Electorate	Party
1919–1922	20th	Rangitikei	Reform
1922–1925	21st	Rangitikei	Reform
1925–1928	22nd	Rangitikei	Reform

Glenn was elected to the Rangitikei electorate in the 1919 general election, but was defeated in 1928. In 1935, he was awarded the King George V Silver Jubilee Medal.

He was the first All Black to be elected to the New Zealand Parliament.

New Zealand Parliament
Preceded by Edward Newman	Member of Parliament for Rangitikei; 1919–1928	Succeeded by James Thomas Hogan
