= Joseph Linklater =

New Zealand politician (1876–1961)

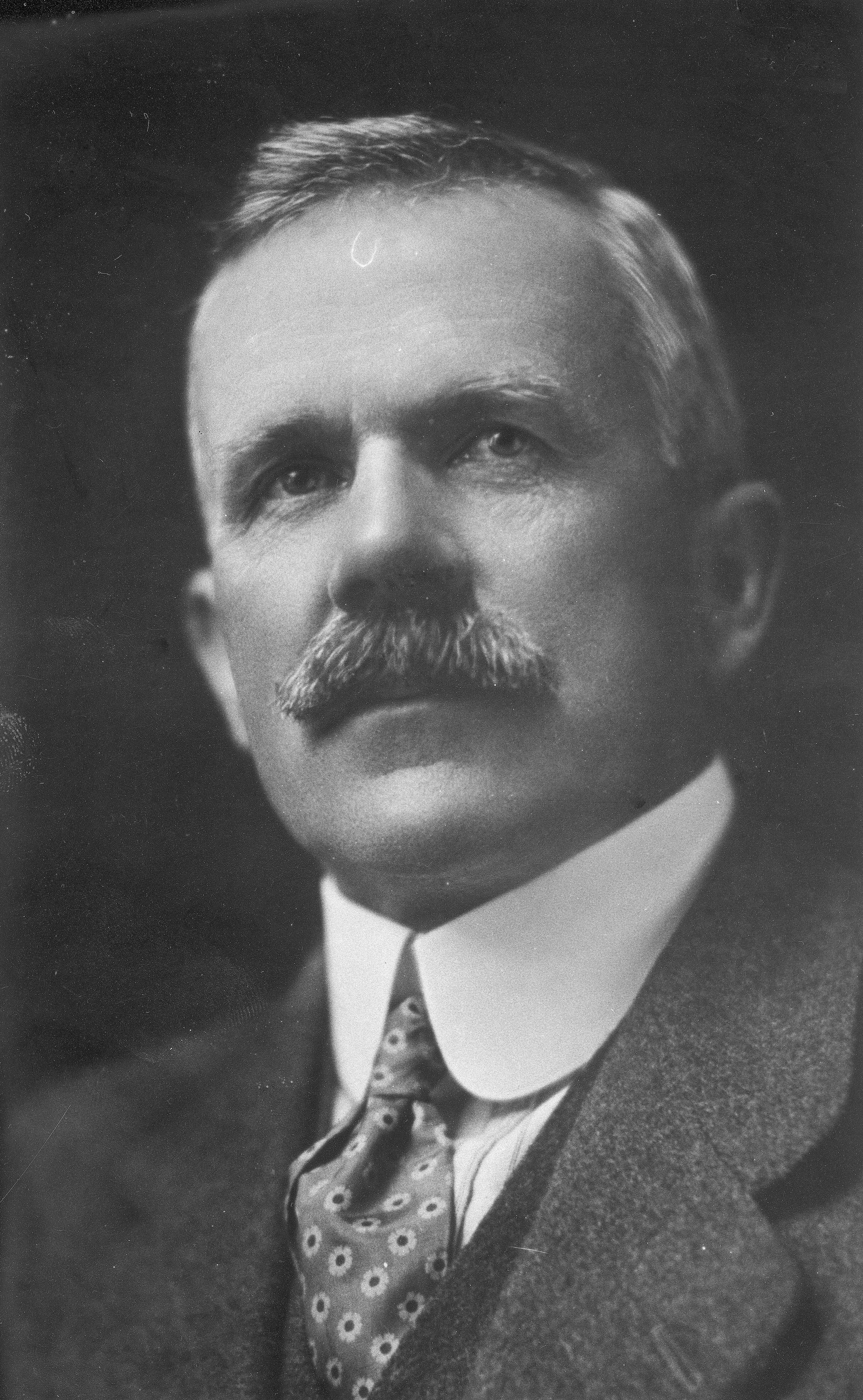
Linklater in 1923

Joseph Linklater OBE (12 March 1876 – 25 April 1961) was a Reform Party Member of Parliament.

== Military service ==
Linklater saw active service as a private in the 6th New Zealand Contingent during the Second Boer War. During World War I he was a second lieutenant in the New Zealand Services Motor-Service Corps.

== Political career ==
New Zealand Parliament
Years	Term	Electorate	Party
1922–1925	21st	Manawatu	Reform
1925–1928	22nd	Manawatu	Reform
1928–1931	23rd	Manawatu	Reform
1931–1935	24th	Manawatu	Reform

He was elected to the Manawatu electorate in the 1922 general election after Edward Newman retired, and held the electorate until he was defeated by Labour's Lorrie Hunter in 1935. He disputed the result of the election and was granted a magisterial recount. The recount did not change the result and Hunter retained the seat.

In 1935, Linklater was awarded the King George V Silver Jubilee Medal. He was appointed an Officer of the Order of the British Empire for services in connection with the supervision of disabled servicemen's farms in the 1949 New Year Honours. In 1953, he was awarded the Queen Elizabeth II Coronation Medal.

== Death ==
Linklater died at Foxton in 1961 and was buried at Kelvin Grove Cemetery, Palmerston North.

New Zealand Parliament
Preceded by Edward Newman	Member of Parliament for Manawatu; 1922–1935	Succeeded by Lorrie Hunter
