= George Sykes (New Zealand politician) =

New Zealand politician

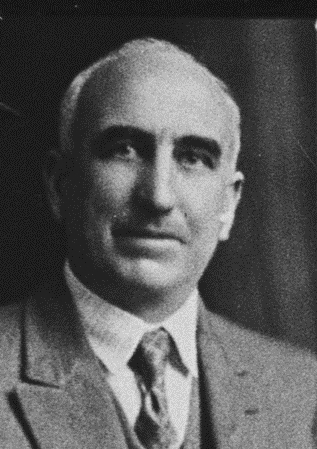
Sykes in 1928

George Robert Sykes (18 November 1867 – 23 March 1957) was a New Zealand Member of Parliament for the Masterton electorate in the North Island.

== Member of Parliament ==
New Zealand Parliament
Years	Term	Electorate	Party
1911–1914	18th	Masterton	Reform
1914–1919	19th	Masterton	Reform
1919–1922	20th	Masterton	Independent
1922–1925	21st	Masterton	Reform
1925–1928	22nd	Masterton	Reform
1928–1931	23rd	Masterton	Reform
1931–1935	24th	Masterton	Reform

George Sykes represented the Masterton electorate in the New Zealand House of Representatives for 24 years from 1911 to 1935.

Sykes was a member of the Reform Party, but in 1919 successfully stood as an independent for Masterton, whilst some commentators questioned whether the independent Reform candidates in 1919 were not just trying to attract votes from the 'unwary'. In 1935, he was awarded the King George V Silver Jubilee Medal. He was awarded a Coronation Medal in 1937.

== Outside politics ==
When he left school he was a telegraph messenger and operator, then he became a farmer and breeder of Romney sheep. After his defeat in the 1935 election, he was an organiser for the National Party until he retired in 1942.

Sykes died on 23 March 1957, aged 89, and was buried in the historic Christ Church in Taitā, Hutt Valley. A memorial to him was erected in the Archer Street Cemetery, Masterton on 31 July 1957.
