= September 1920 New Zealand Liberal Party leadership election =

Election in New Zealand

1920 New Zealand Liberal Party leadership election
- 7 September 1920
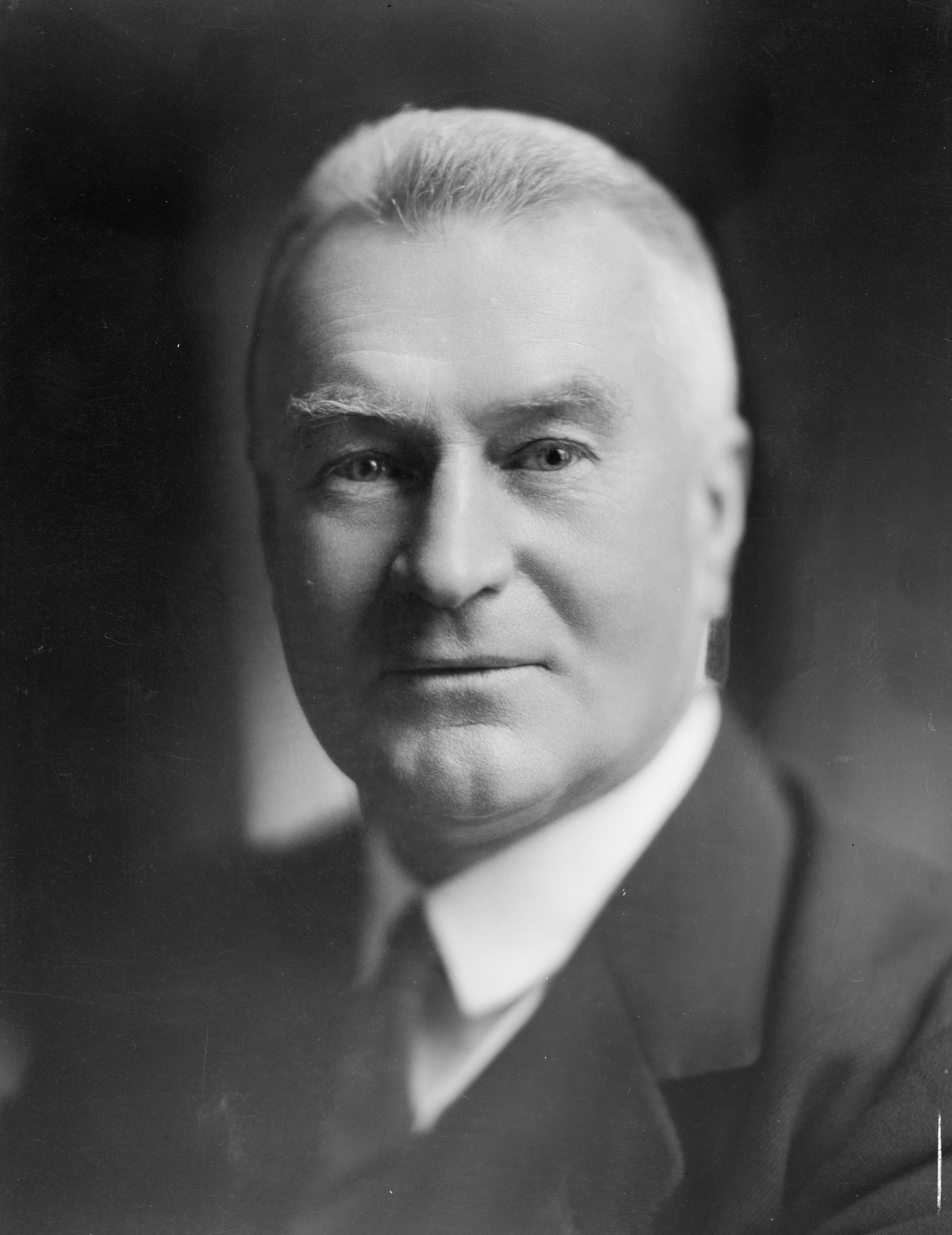
Candidate	Thomas Wilford
Popular vote	elected unopposed
Leader before election
William MacDonald
Leader after election
Thomas Wilford

An election for the leadership of the New Zealand Liberal Party was held on 7 September 1920 to choose the next leader of the party. The election was won by Hutt MP and recent acting party leader Thomas Wilford.

== Background ==
At the 1919 general election the Liberal Party fared poorly losing many seats including that of its leader Sir Joseph Ward. Due to Ward's failure to gain re-election to parliament the acting leader, William MacDonald, took over leadership of the party in January 1920. Macdonald led the party for several months before his health started to deteriorate in mid-1919 after he broke his arm in an accident. As a result, he took leave from his Parliamentary duties for several weeks in order to go to Auckland on a health recuperating visit, leaving Thomas Wilford to act as Leader of the Opposition. Macdonald recovered following his treatment in Auckland and was able to resumed his seat in Parliament. However he died suddenly in his home in Kelburn on 31 August 1920, leaving the party leaderless for the second time in less than a year.

== Candidates ==
Thomas Wilford

Wilford, aged 50, had already had a long political career. He had been an MP continuously since 1902, Chairman of the Wellington Harbour Board and Mayor of Wellington for two years each as well as being a cabinet minister in the wartime coalition government from 1917 to 1919. He had taken a leading role in the party for several years including being one of the main architects of the updated policy manifesto the Liberals took to the electorate at the 1919 general election. When Sir Joseph Ward had lost his parliamentary seat he was speculated as a possible replacement leader, but Wilford ruled himself out in favour of MacDonald.

Others

The names of several other Liberal MPs were suggested as possible leaders:

- George Forbes, the MP for Hurunui since 1908 and Senior Whip of the Liberal Party since 1912.
- Arthur Myers, the MP for Auckland East since 1910 who was Minister of Finance in the short-lived Mackenzie Ministry of 1912 and Minister of Customs in the wartime coalition government from 1917 to 1919.
- Thomas Sidey, an MP since 1901 for the Caversham and then Dunedin South electorates.

== Result ==
A caucus meeting was held with Forbes presiding as chairman. Wilford was nominated by Sidey and seconded by Āpirana Ngata. No other MPs were nominated so as the only officially nominated candidate, he was elected as leader unopposed by the caucus.

== Aftermath ==
Wilford presided over a period of continued decline for the Liberal Party. There were internal divisions that emerged with a small band of Liberal MPs who did not accept Wilford as their leader and preferred the party to remain leaderless until Ward could re-enter Parliament. Wilford had reconciled with these members over the next year and led the party at the 1922 general election, gaining three seats. He resigned the leadership for health reasons in 1925 so he could travel to England for medical treatment.
