= Oswald Hawken =

New Zealand politician

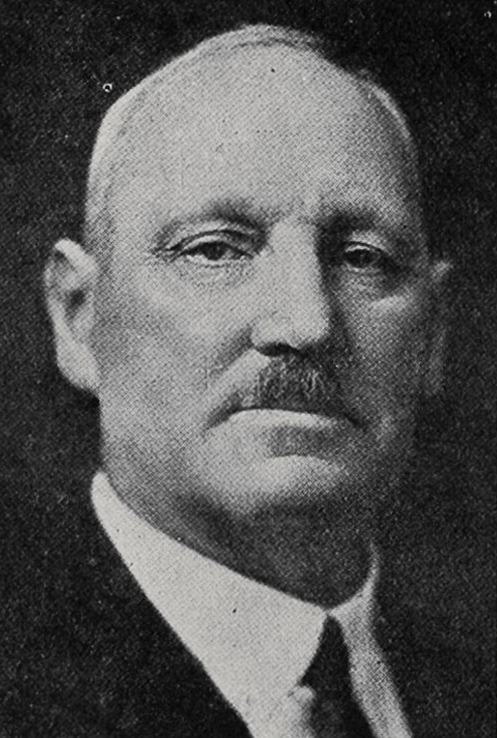
Hawken, c. 1922

New Zealand Parliament
Years	Term	Electorate	Party
1919–1922	20th	Egmont	Reform
1922–1925	21st	Egmont	Reform
1925–1928	22nd	Egmont	Reform

Oswald James Hawken (1870–1957) was a Reform Party Member of Parliament in New Zealand, and was a cabinet minister 1926–1928 in the Reform Government.

He was elected to the Egmont electorate in the 1919 general election, but was defeated in 1928.

In 1935, he was awarded the King George V Silver Jubilee Medal.

New Zealand Parliament
Preceded by Charles Wilkinson	Member of Parliament for Egmont; 1919–1928	Succeeded by Charles Wilkinson
