= John Mason (New Zealand politician) =

New Zealand politician and lawyer

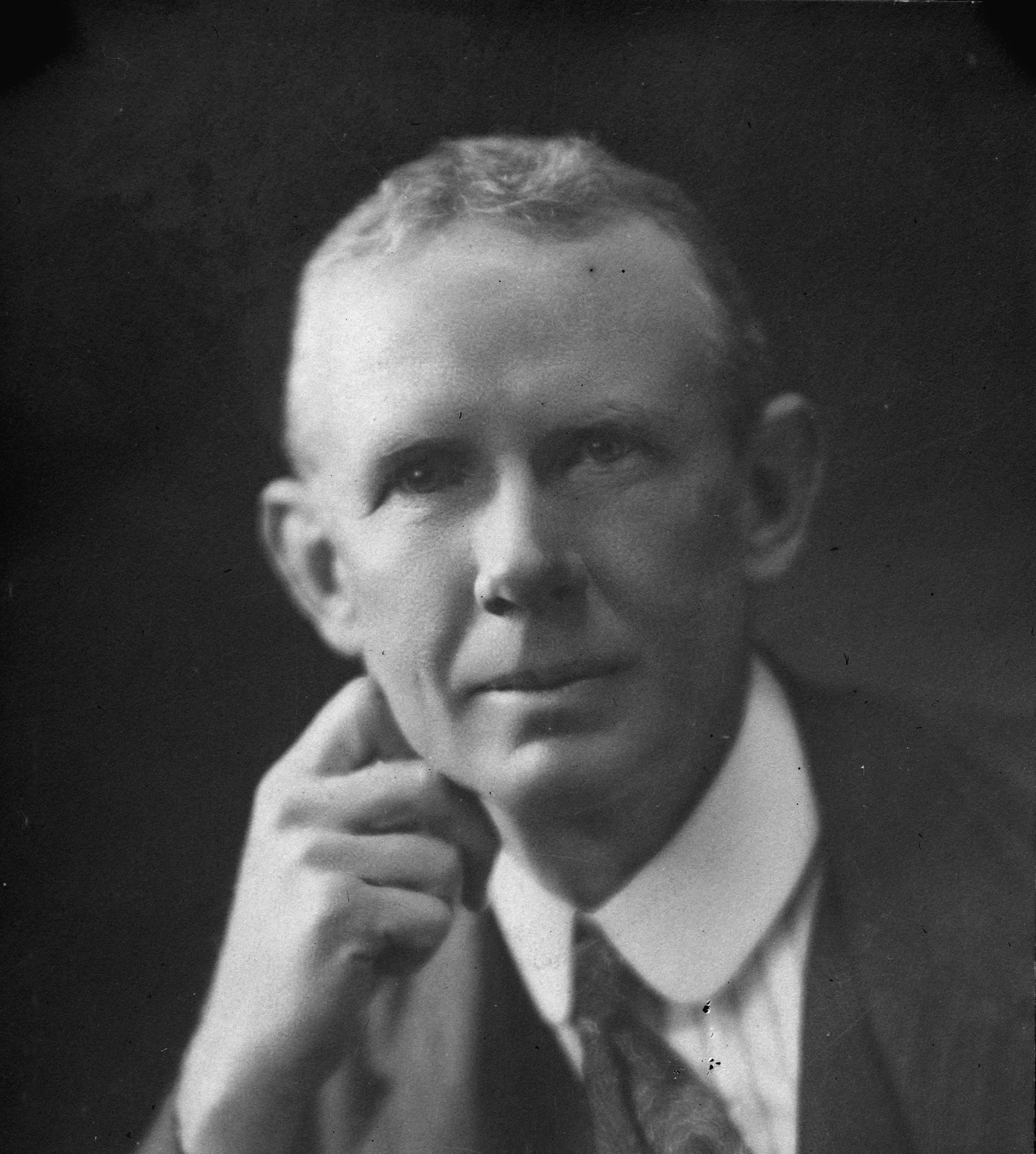
John Mason, ca 1930s

John Mason (26 September 1880 – 9 July 1975) was a New Zealand politician and lawyer. He was a Reform Party Member of Parliament in Hawke's Bay in the 1920s.

== Biography ==
Born in Hastings in 1880, Mason was a lawyer and was for a time in partnership with Matthew Oram.

During World War I, Mason enlisted in the New Zealand Expeditionary Force in January 1916, and served overseas with the New Zealand Medical Corps, rising to the rank of temporary warrant officer class 1. He returned to New Zealand and was discharged in 1919.

New Zealand Parliament
Years	Term	Electorate	Party
1925–1928	22nd	Napier	Reform

Mason contested the Napier electorate in the 1922 election for the Reform Party. Of the four candidates, he came second to Labour's Lew McIlvride.

He won the Napier electorate from McIlvride in the 1925 general election, but was defeated by Labour's Bill Barnard in 1928.

In 1935, he was awarded the King George V Silver Jubilee Medal. Mason turned to local politics and served as a Napier City Councillor from 1941 to 1947.

Mason died in Napier in 1975 and was buried in Wharerangi Cemetery, Napier.

New Zealand Parliament
Preceded by Lew McIlvride	Member of Parliament for Napier; 1925–1928	Succeeded by Bill Barnard
