= George Pearce (New Zealand politician) =

New Zealand politician

New Zealand Parliament
Years	Term	Electorate	Party
1908–1909	17th	Patea	Independent
1909–1911	Changed allegiance to:		Reform
1911–1914	18th	Patea	Reform
1914–1919	19th	Patea	Reform

George Vater Pearce (1863 – 2 June 1935) was a New Zealand politician of the Reform Party.

He represented the Patea electorate in Parliament from 1908 to 1919, when he was defeated. In 1935, he was awarded the King George V Silver Jubilee Medal.

He was born in Devon in 1863, and emigrated to New Zealand in 1875 or 1878. He was a farmer and a noted breeder of Leicester and Lincoln sheep. He was chairman of the Patea County Council for 13 years. He was a rugby player and mile runner. He died in Waitotara near Wanganui.

He was the great-grandfather of a National Party Minister of Finance, Ruth Richardson.
