= Frederick Lye =

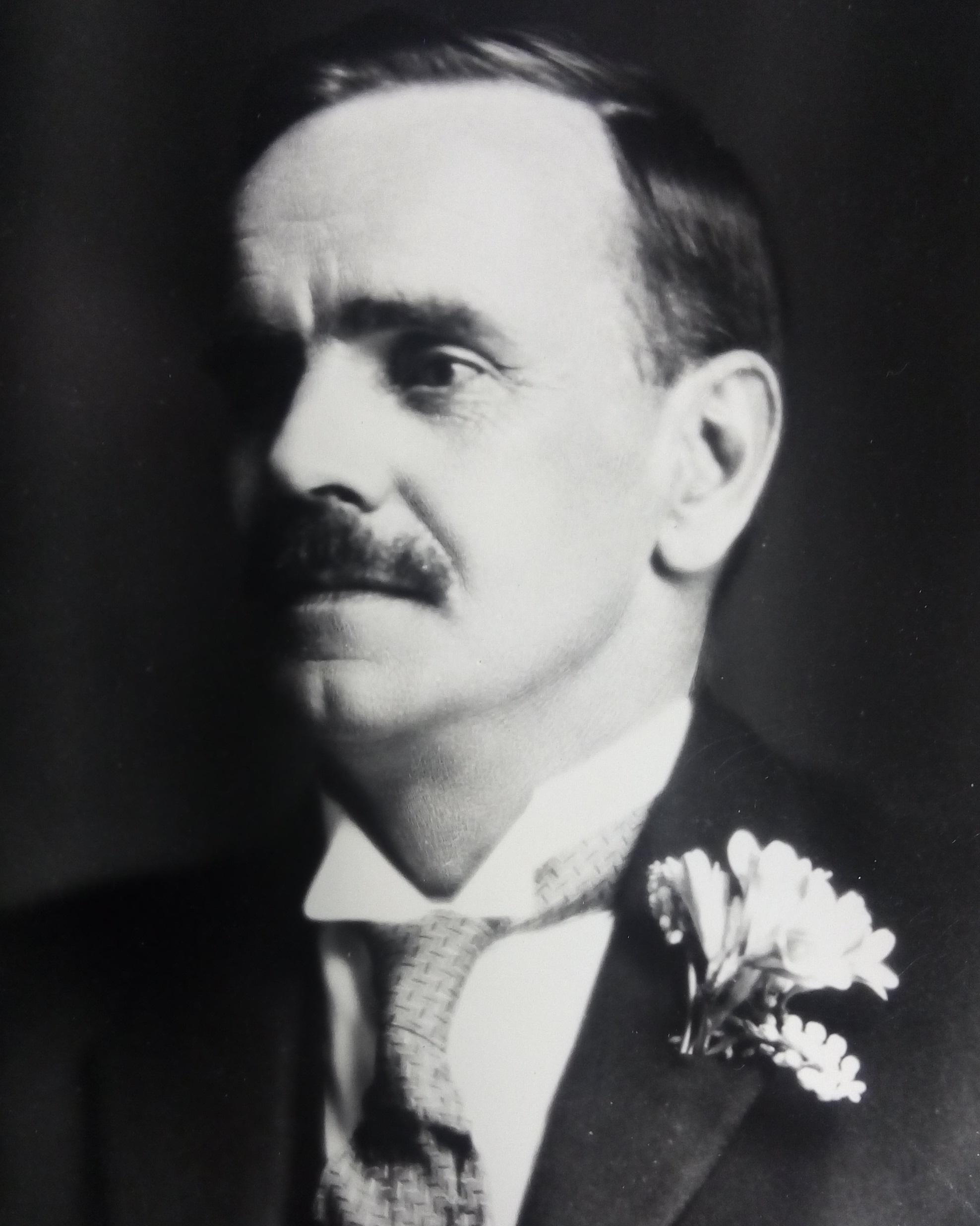

Member of the New Zealand Parliament for Waikato
- In office 7 December 1922 – 4 November 1925
- Preceded by: Alexander Young
- Succeeded by: Stewart Reid
- In office 14 November 1928 – 27 November 1935
- Preceded by: Stewart Reid
- Succeeded by: Robert Coulter

Personal details
- Born: 1881 Tunbridge Wells, Kent, England
- Died: 3 October 1949 (aged 67) Hamilton, New Zealand
- Party: Liberal (1922–28); United (1928–36)

Frederick Arthur Lye (1881 – 3 October 1949) was a New Zealand politician of the Liberal Party then of the United Party. The United Party was a continuation of the historical Liberal Party, albeit more conservative.

== Early life and family ==
Born in Tunbridge Wells, Kent, England, Lye was the son of Robert Bevan Lye. The family moved to New Zealand in 1886, arriving in Auckland, where Lye was educated. He left home when he was 19 years old and found work milking cows on a dairy farm near Pukekohe. About five years later, he took up farming on his own account at Otakeho on Taranaki's Waimate Plains. In 1906, Lye married Charlotte Louie Preece from Kaponga, and the couple went on to have 10 children. They remained farming at Otakeho until 1918, when they moved to Pukekura, just south of Cambridge in the Waikato, while retaining their farming interests in Taranaki.

His younger brother, Samuel Charles Gale Lye (1884–1937), was also a dairy farmer and also stood for the Liberals in several elections.

== Political career ==
New Zealand Parliament
Years	Term	Electorate	Party
1922–1925	21st	Waikato	Liberal
1928–1931	23rd	Waikato	United
1931–1935	24th	Waikato	United

He represented the Waikato electorate from 1922 to 1925, when he was defeated by Stewart Reid of the Reform Party. He won the seat back in 1928, but was defeated by Robert Coulter of the Labour Party in the 1935 landslide to Labour.

In 1935, he was awarded the King George V Silver Jubilee Medal.

== Later life and death ==
Lye remained living at Pukekura until his death at Waikato Hospital in Hamilton on 3 October 1949. He was survived by his wife and 10 children, and was buried at Hautapu Cemetery.

New Zealand Parliament
Preceded by Alexander Young	Member of Parliament for Waikato; 1922–1925; 1928–1935	Succeeded by Stewart Reid
Preceded by Stewart Reid	Member of Parliament for Waikato; 1922–1925; 1928–1935	Succeeded by Robert Coulter
