= David Guthrie (New Zealand politician) =

New Zealand politician (1856–1927)

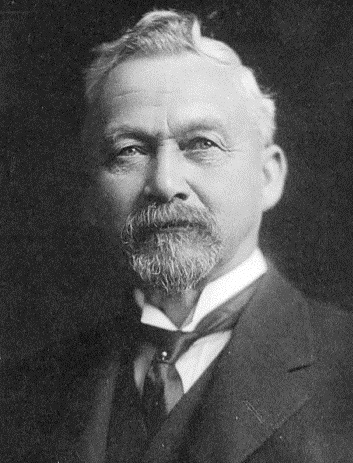
Guthrie c. 1919

David Henry Guthrie (1856 – 31 March 1927) was a New Zealand politician of the Reform Party.

== Biography ==
New Zealand Parliament
Years	Term	Electorate	Party
1908–1909	17th	Oroua	Independent
1909–1911	Changed allegiance to:		Reform
1911–1914	18th	Oroua	Reform
1914–1919	19th	Oroua	Reform
1919–1922	20th	Oroua	Reform
1922–1925	21st	Oroua	Reform

He was the Minister of Railways (1922–1923) in the Reform Government, and the Member of Parliament for Oroua from 1908 to 1925, when he retired.

He was then appointed to the Legislative Council, from 1925 to 1927 when he died.

Political offices
Preceded by William Massey	Minister of Railways; 1922–1923	Succeeded by Gordon Coates
New Zealand Parliament
Preceded by Frank Lethbridge	Member of Parliament for Oroua; 1908–1925	Succeeded by John Gordon Eliott
