= Walter Powdrell =

New Zealand politician

New Zealand Parliament
Years	Term	Electorate	Party
1919–1921	20th	Patea	Reform

Walter Dutton Powdrell (1872 – 9 March 1921) was a Reform Party Member of Parliament in New Zealand.

Powdrell was born in Wairoa in 1872.

He won the Patea electorate in 1919, and held it until he died in 1921. According to the Coroner's Report into the death, Powdrell fell from a building on 9 March 1921. The fall caused injuries to the spine, which led to death later in the day. The coroner decreed that "whether death was accident or design, there was no evidence."
