= John McManus (New Zealand politician) =

New Zealand politician (1875–1950)

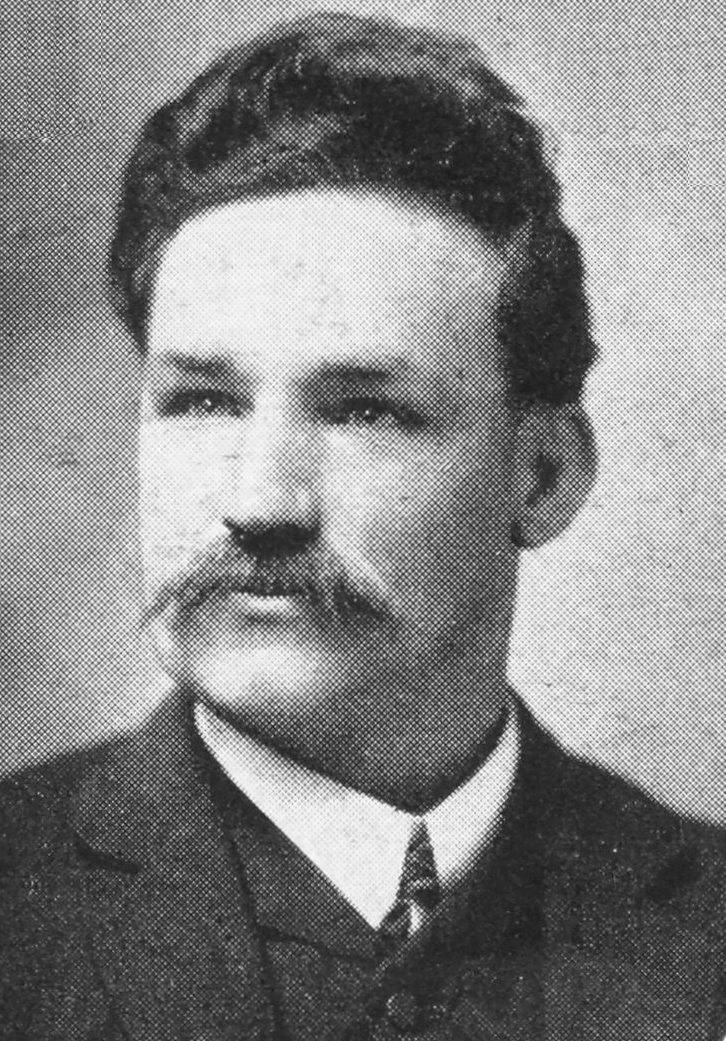

Dunedin City Councillor
- In office 1923–1926

Personal details
- Born: 14 February 1875 Caven, Ireland
- Died: 1950 (aged 74–75) New Zealand
- Party: Labour
- Spouse: Nellie McManus

Military service
- Allegiance: New Zealand Army
- Years of service: 1915-19
- Rank: Sapper
- Battles/wars: World War I

John Edward McManus (14 February 1875 – 1950), often known as "Big John" due to his large stature, was a New Zealand politician, trade unionist and farmer.

== Early life ==
Born in Caven, Ireland in 1875, McManus immigrated to Australia and was the organizer of the Australian Workers' Union from 1900 to 1905. He then shifted to New Zealand in 1906, joining the New Zealand Socialist Party and becoming the Secretary of the Dunedin General Labourers Union. By trade he was a tunneller, working for the Public Works Department in Kahnika. McManus changed from the Socialist Party to join the more moderate Labour Party at the behest of his good friend Tom Paul who was a leading figure in the party.

== Political activity ==
During the factional bickering amongst the early Labour movement in New Zealand, McManus sided with Paul and David McLaren. McManus was the Labour Party candidate for Dunedin South in 1911, narrowly losing to Liberal Party incumbent Thomas Sidey in a two-horse race. Had an Independent Liberal or Reform Party candidate also contested and forced a second ballot, McManus may well have been elected to Parliament.

Despite, like Paul, thinking the Waihi miners' strike was futile, McManus was one of the United Labour Party members who favoured the establishment of the Social Democratic Party (SDP) in 1913. The SDP was strongly opposed by Paul, though the pair remained on speaking terms with one another.

In 1915, McManus enlisted to serve in World War I. He saw action in France as a sapper with the New Zealand Engineers Tunnelling Company.

McManus was the Labour Party's candidate for Dunedin West in 1922 and for Dunedin South again in 1925. He was unsuccessful on both occasions. However, he was later elected as a Dunedin City Councillor in 1923 before suffering a stroke in 1926. He then became a farmer from 1926 to 1938. He attempted a political comeback in 1938 standing for the Dunedin City Council again, but was unsuccessful.

MacManus died 1950.
