= Gilbert McKay =

Gilbert McKay (29 May 1865 – 13 June 1954) was a Liberal Party Member of Parliament in New Zealand. Born in Dunedin, he farmed in Ōtāne in the Hawke's Bay.

== Early life ==
McKay was born in Dunedin in 1865, the son of Gilbert McKay (1841–1922) and his wife Margaret McKay (née Houliston, 1841–1913).

== Life in Hawke's Bay ==
McKay lived in Ōtāne and was the president of the Heretaunga Club in Hastings. A farmer, he was described as a "shrewd local politician". He was the chairman of the school committee in Ōtāne.

== Political career ==
New Zealand Parliament
Years	Term	Electorate	Party
1922–1925	21st	Hawkes Bay	Liberal

McKay first stood for Parliament in the 1919 election for the Liberal Party in the Hawkes Bay electorate, where he came a distant second to Hugh Campbell of the Reform Party out of three candidates. He won the Hawke's Bay electorate in 1922 against Reform's Andrew Hamilton Russell (Campbell had retired due to ill health), but was defeated in 1925 by Campbell. He stood in the 1928 election for the United Party, but came last out of the three candidates, with Campbell holding the electorate.

== Family and death ==
McKay was married three times. He married Rosina Collins (1877–1907) on 19 February 1894 and they had eight children before she died on 11 April 1907. On 24 October 1908, he married Elaine McDermott (1885–1913). They had no children but she brought a daughter (born 1906) into the union. His second wife died on 22 January 1913 aged 28. On 1 October 1913, he married Violet Person (1895–1966) of Anaroa homestead (15 km north of Ōtāne). They had four children.

McKay died on 13 June 1954.

New Zealand Parliament
Preceded by Hugh Campbell	Member of Parliament for Hawkes Bay; 1922–1925	Succeeded by Hugh McLean Campbell
