= Patea (electorate) =

Patea is a former New Zealand electorate in south Taranaki. It existed from 1893 to 1963.

== Population centres ==
In the 1892 electoral redistribution, the population shift to the North Island required the transfer of one seat from the South Island to the north. The resulting ripple effect saw every electorate established in 1890 have its boundaries altered, and eight electorates were established for the first time, including Patea.

The electorate was based in the town of Pātea, which used to have freezing-works for the preparation of meat for export until 1982.

== History ==
This rural seat was first established for the 1893 election. George Hutchison was the first elected representative. He resigned in June 1901. Frederick Haselden won the 1 August 1901 by-election, but the seat was declared vacant in the following year. Walter Symes then held the electorate, from 1902 to the dissolution of Parliament in 1908.

The 1908 election was won by George Pearce. He held the electorate for three terms, until the dissolution of Parliament in 1919. He was succeeded by Walter Powdrell from 1919, who died partway through the term on 9 March 1921. Edwin Dixon won the 1921 by-election and held the electorate for the remainder of the term until 1922. James Randall Corrigan succeeded Dixon in 1922 and he held the electorate for one term until 1925. He was followed by Harold Dickie from 1925 to 1943.

William Sheat won the 1943 election plus the three subsequent elections. In 1954, Sheat failed to gain reselection after boundary changes as a National Party candidate. On 14 May of that year, he promptly resigned his seat and won it back in the 31 July 1954 by-election as an independent, but subsequently did not stand in the 1954 general election.

The candidate chosen instead of Sheat, Roy Jack, was successful in 1954. He held the electorate until 1963, when it was abolished and replaced by the Waimarino electorate.

=== Members of Parliament ===
Key Conservative Liberal Reform National Independent

Election	Winner
1893 election	George Hutchison
1896 election	George Hutchison
1899 election	George Hutchison
July 1901 by-election	Frederick Haselden
November 1901 by-election	Frederick Haselden
1902 election	Walter Symes
1905 election	Walter Symes
1908 election	George Pearce
1911 election	George Pearce
1914 election	George Pearce
1919 election	Walter Powdrell
1921 by-election	Edwin Dixon
1922 election	James Randall Corrigan
1925 election	Harold Dickie
1928 election	Harold Dickie
1931 election	Harold Dickie
1935 election	Harold Dickie
1938 election	Harold Dickie
1943 election	William Sheat
1946 election	William Sheat
1949 election	William Sheat
1951 election	William Sheat
1954 by-election	William Sheat
1954 election	Roy Jack
1957 election	Roy Jack
1960 election	Roy Jack
(Electorate abolished 1963)

== Election results ==
=== 1954 election ===
1954 general election: Patea
Party	Candidate	Votes	%	±%
National	Roy Jack	5,547	45.06	
Labour	Benjamin Winchcombe	4,885	39.68	
Social Credit	R E Dwason	1,879	15.26	
Majority		662	5.38	
Turnout		12,311	91.00	
Registered electors		13,528		
National hold		Swing		

=== 1954 by-election ===
1954 Patea by-election
Party	Candidate	Votes	%	±%
Independent	William Sheat	3,648	48.11	−11.13
Labour	Benjamin Winchcombe	3,630	47.87	
Independent Liberal	John Duggan	305	4.02	
Majority		18	0.24	−18.24
Turnout		7,583	50.12	−38.13
Registered electors		15,131		
Independent gain from National		Swing		

=== 1951 election ===
1951 general election: Patea
Party	Candidate	Votes	%	±%
National	William Sheat	7,910	59.24	
Labour	Frederick William Finer	5,443	40.76	
Majority		2,467	18.48	
Informal votes				
Turnout		13,353	88.25	
Registered electors		15,131		
National hold		Swing		

=== 1931 election ===
1931 general election: Patea
Party	Candidate	Votes	%	±%
Reform	Harold Dickie	5,976	70.66	+19.63
Labour	William Simpson	2,481	29.34	
Majority		3,495	41.33	+39.27
Informal votes		90	1.05	+0.05
Turnout		8,547	84.53	−5.74
Registered electors		10,111		

=== 1928 election ===
1928 general election: Patea
Party	Candidate	Votes	%	±%
Reform	Harold Dickie	4,511	51.03	
United	James Douglas Hislop	4,329	48.97	
Majority		182	2.06	
Informal votes		90	1.01	
Turnout		8,930	90.27	
Registered electors		9,892		

=== 1921 by-election ===
1921 Patea by-election
Party	Candidate	Votes	%	±%
Reform	Edwin Dixon	2,620	47.80	
Liberal	William Morrison	2,315	42.23	−24.37
Labour	Lew McIlvride	546	9.96	
Majority		305	5.56	
Turnout		5,481		

=== November 1901 by-election ===
November 1901 Patea by-election
Party	Candidate	Votes	%	±%
Independent	Frederick Haselden	1,890	52.37	
Liberal	John Heslop	1,719	47.63	
Majority		171	4.74	
Turnout		3,609		

=== July 1901 by-election ===
July 1901 Patea by-election
Party	Candidate	Votes	%	±%
Independent	Frederick Haselden	961	38.63	
Liberal	John Heslop	960	38.59	
Independent Liberal	Arthur Remington	567	22.79	
Majority		1	0.04	
Turnout		2,488		

=== 1899 election ===
1899 general election: Patea
Party	Candidate	Votes	%	±%
Conservative	George Hutchison	1,858	51.80	
Liberal	Arthur Remington	1,729	48.20	
Majority		129	3.60	
Turnout		3,587	74.00	
Registered electors		4,847		
