= William Paul (New Zealand politician) =

New Zealand politician

William Paul (1875–1942) was a New Zealand politician.

== Political activity ==
Born at Waimate, New Zealand in 1875, Paul was a shearer and farmer. He was the NZLP candidate for Waitaki in 1911 and 1919 then stood as an independent Labour candidate in 1922.

William Paul served on the Waimate Borough Council for 29 years (1913–42) and was deputy Mayor in 1942 at the time of his death.
