= Edward Newman (New Zealand politician) =

New Zealand politician

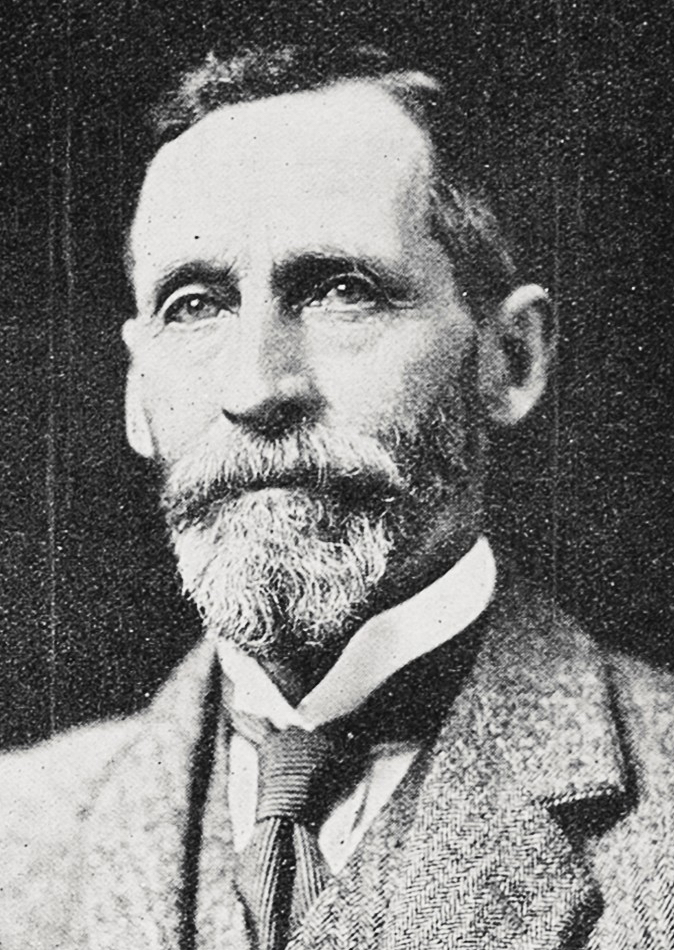
Edward Newman

Edward Newman CMG (4 July 1858 – 24 April 1946) was a Reform Party Member of Parliament and a member of the New Zealand Legislative Council in the early 20th century.

== Early life and family ==
Newman was born in the Partick area of Glasgow, Scotland, in 1858. His father, also called Edward Newman, was a surgeon in the Royal Navy and his mother was Annabella Newman (née Smith). He emigrated to New Zealand around 1875, and worked on sheep farms, until he took up his own property in the Turakina Valley in 1882. He returned to Glasgow to marry Catherine Ann Wilson in 1886. The couple had two children, one of whom died in infancy.

== Political career ==
New Zealand Parliament
Years	Term	Electorate	Party
1908–1909	17th	Manawatu	Conservative
1909–1911	Changed allegiance to:		Reform
1911–1914	18th	Rangitikei	Reform
1914–1919	19th	Rangitikei	Reform
1919–1922	20th	Manawatu	Reform

He represented Manawatu from 1908, then Rangitikei from 1911, then Manawatu again from 1919. He retired in 1922. He was appointed to the New Zealand Legislative Council on 1 June 1923 and served one term until 31 May 1930.

In the 1923 New Year Honours, Newman was appointed a Companion of the Order of St Michael and St George. In 1935, he was awarded the King George V Silver Jubilee Medal.

== Flock House ==
Newman played an active role in establishing Flock House. He wanted the farmers of New Zealand to acknowledge the efforts of the British seamen who kept the sea lanes open during World War I. He established a fund so that the sons of British seamen who had been killed or wounded could be trained in New Zealand to start a new life, in conjunction with the Sheepfarmers' Association of New Zealand.

A property was purchased in 1924, and Flock House remained an agricultural training facility until 1988.

== Notes ==
New Zealand Parliament
Preceded by Jack Stevens	Member of Parliament for Manawatu; 1908–1911 1919–1922	In abeyance Title next held by himself
In abeyance Title last held by himself	Member of Parliament for Manawatu; 1908–1911 1919–1922	Succeeded by Joseph Linklater
Preceded by Robert William Smith	Member of Parliament for Rangitikei; 1911–1919	Succeeded by Billy Glenn
