= Lew McIlvride =

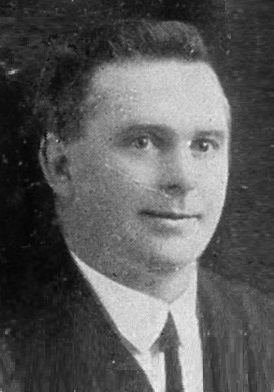

Member of the New Zealand Parliament for Napier
- In office 7 December 1922 – 4 November 1925
- Preceded by: Vigor Brown
- Succeeded by: John Mason

Personal details
- Born: 26 January 1882 Glasgow, Scotland
- Died: 9 November 1949 (aged 67) Wellington, New Zealand
- Party: Labour
- Spouse: Emily Jobe (m. 1913)

Lewis McIlvride (26 January 1882 – 9 November 1949) was a New Zealand Member of Parliament and trade unionist.

== Biography ==
=== Early life and career ===
McIlvride was born in Glasgow, Scotland, on 26 January 1882. He emigrated to Canada and was employed by the Canadian Pacific Railway company. In 1908 he left Canada and moved to New Zealand where he attained employment first with A. and G. Price of Thames, and later by the New Zealand Railways Department. In 1913 married Emily Jobe.

=== Political career ===
New Zealand Parliament
Years	Term	Electorate	Party
1922–1925	21st	Napier	Labour

At the 1919 election he stood as the Labour Party candidate in the Wanganui electorate, where he finished third. He then unsuccessfully contested the Patea by-election, a rural Taranaki seat, in 1921 as the Labour nominee. Of the three candidates, he came last with just under ten percent of the vote. While McIlvride polled a very small vote, he was the only one of the three candidates who increased the vote for his party compared with 1919.

McIlvride represented the Napier electorate in the New Zealand House of Representatives from 1922 to 1925 for the Labour Party.

=== Later life and death ===
After exiting Parliament he became the National Secretary of the Amalgamated Society of Railway Servants in 1927, succeeding Joe Mack, who had held that position since 1908. Later McIlvride also held office in the Amalgamated Society of Engineers.

McIlvride died in Wellington on 9 November 1949, aged 67.

== Notes ==
New Zealand Parliament
Preceded by Vigor Brown	Member of Parliament for Napier; 1922–1925	Succeeded by John Mason
