= Archibald McNicol =

New Zealand politician (1878–1933)

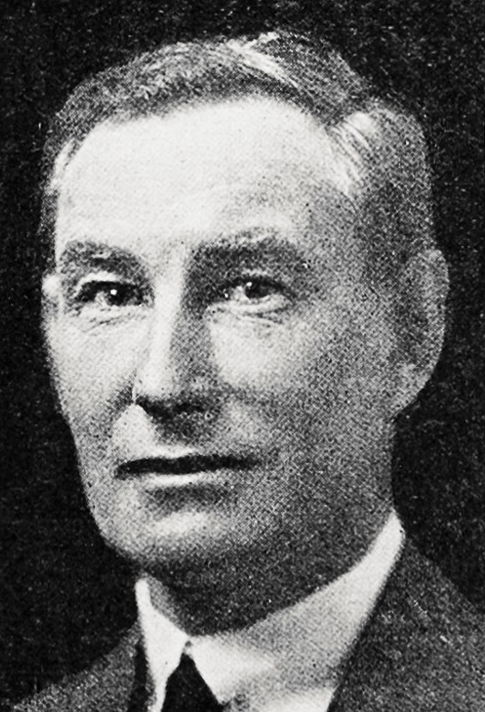
- Born: Archibald Moses McNicol; 3 August 1878; Waihola, New Zealand
- Died: 31 August 1933 (aged 55); Dannevirke, New Zealand
- Occupations: Journalist, newspaper editor
- Spouse: Daisy Edwina Paterson (m. 1911)
- Children: 3

Archibald Moses McNicol (3 August 1878 – 31 August 1933) was a Reform Party Member of Parliament in New Zealand.

== Early life and family ==
McNicol was born at Waihola on 3 August 1878, the son of the Reverend John and Harriet McNicol. He was educated at Union Street School in Dunedin, before working on a dairy farm at Edendale and as a shepherd in Central Otago during his youth. He later purchased a farm at Merton, north of Dunedin.

On 28 February 1911, McNicol married Daisy Edwina Paterson at Farndon, south of Napier, and the couple went on to have three daughters.

== Newspaper career ==
McNicol joined the Otago Daily Times in Dunedin as a mining reporter, before moving to The Daily Telegraph in Napier, where he rose to become chief reporter. When the Dannevirke Evening News was established in 1909, he became that newspaper's sub-editor, but shortly thereafter he was appointed managing editor. McNicol served as a council member of the New Zealand branch of the Empire Press Union, and as a director of the United Press Association. He was a member of the New Zealand delegation to the 1930 Imperial Press Conference held in London.

== Political career ==
New Zealand Parliament
Years	Term	Electorate	Party
1919–1922	20th	Pahiatua	Reform

He was elected to the Pahiatua electorate in the 1919 general election, but was defeated in 1922.

== Other activities ==
McNicol served as a member of the board of governors of Dannevirke High School, and chaired the local Repatriation Committee following World War I. He also served as president of the Dannevirke Rugby Sub-Union, the Dannevirke Chamber of Commerce, and local Rotary club.

== Death ==
McNicol died at his home in Dannevirke on 31 August 1933, and was buried at Mangatera Cemetery. His wife died in 1972.
