= John Gilchrist (New Zealand politician) =

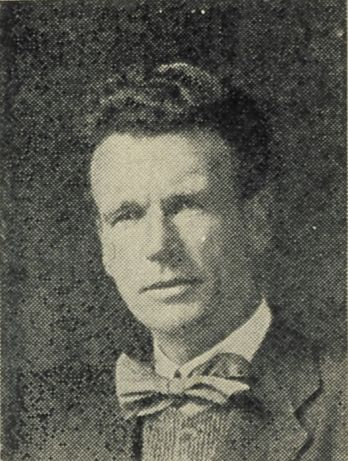
Gilchrist in 1922

John Gilchrist (1872 – 14 April 1947) was a Scottish socialist who became a political activist in New Zealand.

== Political activity ==
Born in Scotland in 1872, Gilchrist was a member of the Scottish Independent Labour Party and emigrated to New Zealand in 1900. He joined the Wellington Socialist Party in 1901 and later was Secretary of the Fabian Society, PLL (Political Labour League) and LRC in Dunedin. Gilchrist was the New Zealand Labour Party candidate for Port Chalmers in 1919, Dunedin Central in 1922 and 1925, and Dunedin West in 1931. He left the Labour Party over the issue of monetary reform. He intended to contest the Auckland West electorate in the 1943 election as an Independent, but did not stand.

A strong rationalist he was a shoemaker, bricklayer and insurance salesman. Gilchrist became a member of the Social Credit Party later in life and died on 14 April 1947 aged 74 years.
