= Percy Vinnell =

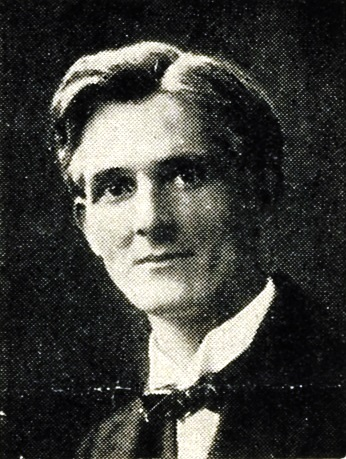
Percy Vinnell in 1922.

Percy Cornelius Vinnell (1879 – 23 February 1938) was a New Zealand businessman and Mayor of Timaru.

Born in Oxfordshire, England in 1879 the son of Cornelius Vinnell and Joanna (née Pursey), Vinnell was educated at St Paul's School in Oxford before coming to New Zealand in 1913. He spent two years in Wellington, working at a boot factory before moving to Timaru after his marriage, where he set up business as a boot manufacturer at the Canterbury Shoe Company.

Percy was first elected to the Timaru Borough Council in 1919, and served under three mayors. He succeeded T. W. Satterthwaite as mayor in June 1936 after his sudden death. He was also the Labour candidate for Timaru in 1919, 1922 and 1925.

Vinnell died on 23 February 1938.
