= Adam Hamilton =

Adam Hamilton may refer to:

- Adam Hamilton (New Zealand politician) (1880–1952), New Zealand politician
- Adam Hamilton (musician) (fl. 1980s–2020s), Los Angeles based music producer, songwriter and session musician
- Adam Hamilton (pastor) (born 1964), U.S. Senator-elect

== See also ==
- Adam Hamilton Ingram, Scottish politician and MSP
