= James Randall Corrigan =

New Zealand politician

James Randall Corrigan (10 July 1865 – 19 March 1935) was a New Zealand Liberal Party Member of Parliament, farmer and businessman.

== Biography ==
New Zealand Parliament
Years	Term	Electorate	Party
1922–1925	21st	Patea	Liberal

Born at Woodend, North Canterbury, Corrigan was a very successful farmer in the North Island, and breeder of sheep, cattle and trotting horses. He died in Hāwera aged 69 years.

James Corrigan represented the Patea electorate in the New Zealand House of Representatives between 1922 and 1925.

A daughter, Dorothy Corrigan, married the Independent MP for Nelson, Harry Atmore, in 1936.
