= Allen Bell =

New Zealand politician

Lieutenant Colonel Allen Bell
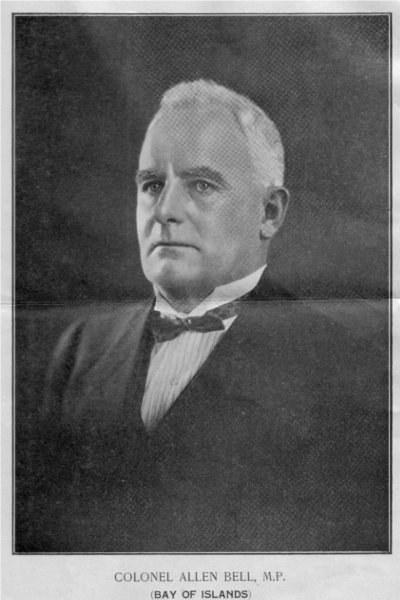
- Allen Bell ca 1922

Member of the New Zealand Parliament for Bay of Islands
- In office 1922–1928
- Preceded by: Vernon Reed
- Succeeded by: Harold Rushworth

Personal details
- Born: 14 February 1870 Southbridge, Canterbury
- Died: 15 October 1936 (aged 66) Kaitaia, Northland
- Party: Independent (1922–1925); Reform (1925–1928)

Lt. Colonel Allan (Allen) Bell (14 February 1870 – 15 October 1936) was a New Zealand Member of Parliament for the Bay of Islands in Northland.

== Early life ==
Bell was born at Southbridge, New Zealand on 14 February 1870. He was the son of Allen and Mary, farmers in the area. He worked as a bushman and a farmer. In 1895, Bell travelled to southern Africa and served with the British armed forces that in 1896 suppressed a rising by the Matabele (Ndebele) people.

He then saw active service with the Rhodesia Regiment during the South African (Boer) War. Bell was discharged on 31 January 1900 and returned to Taranaki. On 29 January 1902 he married James Helen Shaw Lambie at Pihama. They bought land at Te Rapa, north of Hamilton. Their daughter Elaline was born there on 6 July 1904.

== Hamilton and the Waikato ==
Bell was a member of the Waipa County Council and the Hamilton Borough Council. He was the founder of the Waikato Agricultural and Pastoral (A & P) Association and the first director of the Waikato Dairy Company in 1912.

As a conservative, Bell stood for the Waikato electorate at the 1908 general election for the opposition, but lost to the incumbent from the Liberal Party, Henry Greenslade. At the 1911 general election Bell stood as an unofficial Reform Party candidate in the newly formed Raglan electorate; the official Reform Party candidate was Richard Bollard. Bell came into conflict with the party's executive over liquor licensing issues, as "it was used not for the purpose of raising the status of politics, but in the interest of the liquor party." During the campaign Bell created controversy when he advocated the abolition of the monarchy, and the creation of a New Zealand republic. He also argued for the abolition of New Zealand's upper house and Britain's House of Lords. As a result of his comments, the Reform Party disendorsed Bell as their candidate. The armed forces considered that Bell had broken his Oath of Allegiance as an Officer (Lieutenant Colonel). Under pressure, he reluctantly resigned his commission in January 1912.

== Legion of Frontiersmen ==
In 1911, Bell joined the New Zealand Command of the Legion of Frontiersmen and after his discharge from the army went on to devote much of his time and energy into the promoting and expanding the Legion. Bell was appointed as the Legion's Commandant for Auckland with the rank of Colonel. He retained and used this Legion of Frontiersmen rank for the rest of his life.

In 1912, Bell journeyed to Dargaville and met with local men Dick Long, Andy Knudson and one other met in the Central Hotel in Dargaville one winter's night and formed the Northern Wairoa (Mounted Rifles) Squadron of the Legion.

In 1913, as Commandant of the Auckland District Bell convened and chaired a meeting of the Legion in the "Hall of Commerce" for the purpose of considering the viability of setting up a Dominion Executive of the Legion, the election of a Commandant for the North Island and other matters. A ballot was taken by A Squadron's secretary, Frontiersman Thomas E. Whitton, which showed a large majority in favour of a Dominion Executive, a five shilling annual levy for its support, and election of Colonel Bell as the North Island Commandant of the Legion. Captain Forbes-Eadie LOF moved that the current Auckland Executive be disbanded and that Colonel Bell's new executive take over. This was unanimously approved. At the conclusion of the meeting Colonel Bell referred to the great loss sustained by the Defence Forces by the very recent death of Mrs Brewis (of Hamilton), who was the first woman in New Zealand to assist in organising the universal military training movement.

== Northland ==
In 1914, three Bell brothers (Allen, Leonard and Walter) bought land in what is today Kaitaia. He was an enthusiastic promoter of the area north of Auckland, and did much lobbying for making the area accessible via roads and bridges. He acted as a land agent and was a newspaper editor, first writing for the Northern Age and then founding the Northlander. Bell was a supporter of the government's scheme of draining land in the Kaitaia area, and as an owner of swampy land and a land agent, he personally benefited from the initiative.

== Member of Parliament ==
New Zealand Parliament
Years	Term	Electorate	Party
1922–1925	21st	Bay of Islands	Independent
1925–1928	22nd	Bay of Islands	Reform

Bell received a requisition in September 1922 for the upcoming election and agreed to stand in the Bay of Islands electorate on the condition that he could be an independent. He stood for opposition interests (at the time, William Massey's Reform government was in power) and was variously described as an independent or Independent Liberal. He won against the incumbent of the Reform Party, Vernon Reed.

In 1925, Bell successfully stood for the Reform Party, but was defeated by Harold Rushworth of the Country Party in 1928. The election result was declared void, but in the subsequent 1929 by-election Rushworth was again elected.

== Death ==
Bell retired in Paua on the Parengarenga Harbour. He died there on 15 October 1936.

== Notes ==
New Zealand Parliament
Preceded by Vernon Reed	Member of Parliament for Bay of Islands; 1922–1928	Succeeded by Harold Rushworth
