= Ian Hill (disambiguation) =

Ian Hill (born 1952) is an English bassist and member of the heavy metal band Judas Priest.

Ian Hill may also refer to:

- Sir Ian Hill (cardiologist) (1904–1982), Scottish cardiologist
- Ian Hill (diplomat), New Zealand diplomat
- Irene Dubois, American drag queen, born Ian Hill
