= Kenneth Williams (politician) =

New Zealand politician (1870–1935)

Kenneth Stuart Williams
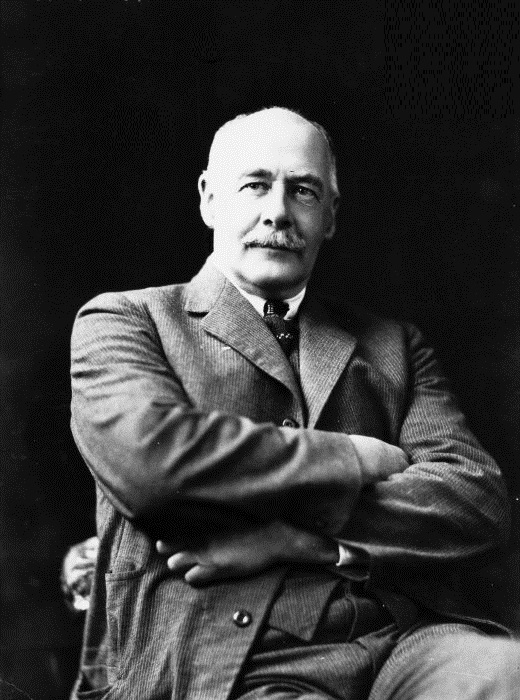
- Williams, c. 1930

Member of Parliament for Bay of Plenty
- In office 1920–1935
- Preceded by: Williams MacDonald
- Succeeded by: Gordon Hultquist

Personal details
- Born: 13 September 1870 Pakaraka, Bay of Islands, New Zealand
- Died: 25 November 1935 (aged 65)
- Party: Reform
- Parents: John William Williams (father); Sarah Busby (mother)
- Relatives: Henry Williams (paternal grandfather); James Busby (maternal grandfather); Agnes Williams (sister); Heathcote Williams (brother); Edward Marsh Williams (uncle); Samuel Williams (uncle); Henry Williams (uncle)
- Education: Heretaunga School; Christ's College, Christchurch

Kenneth Stuart Williams (13 September 1870 – 25 November 1935) was a Reform Party Member of Parliament in New Zealand. He was Minister of Public Works from 1926 to 1928 in the Reform Government.

== Early life ==
Williams was born in Pakaraka in the Bay of Islands in 1870 to parents John William Williams and Sarah Busby. He was a grandson of the missionary Henry Williams and of James Busby. He was educated at Heretaunga School in Hastings and Christ's College in Christchurch.

== Political career ==
New Zealand Parliament
| Years | Term | Electorate | Party |
|---|---|---|---|
| 1920–1922 | 20th | Bay of Plenty | Reform |
| 1922–1925 | 21st | Bay of Plenty | Reform |
| 1925–1928 | 22nd | Bay of Plenty | Reform |
| 1928–1931 | 23rd | Bay of Plenty | Reform |
| 1931–1935 | 24th | Bay of Plenty | Reform |

In 1903–09, he was chairman of Waiapu County. He won the Bay of Plenty electorate in a 1920 by-election after the death of the previous MP, William MacDonald; and held it until 1935. He was elected unopposed three times; in 1922, 1925 & 1931; in 1928 he was opposed by Alexander Moncur for Labour.

He was Minister of Public Works (12 June 1926 – 10 December 1928) in the Reform Government under Gordon Coates, and briefly Minister of Lands, and Commissioner of State Forests (28 November 1928 – 10 December 1928).

In 1934, he had decided to retire at the end of the term because of health problems from an accident, but died on 25 November 1935 at a garden party held in his honour, just two days before the 1935 general election.

In 1935, Williams was awarded the King George V Silver Jubilee Medal.

== Notes ==
New Zealand Parliament
| Preceded by William MacDonald | Member of Parliament for Bay of Plenty; 1920–1935 | Succeeded by Gordon Hultquist |
