= John Cobbe =

New Zealand politician (1859–1944)

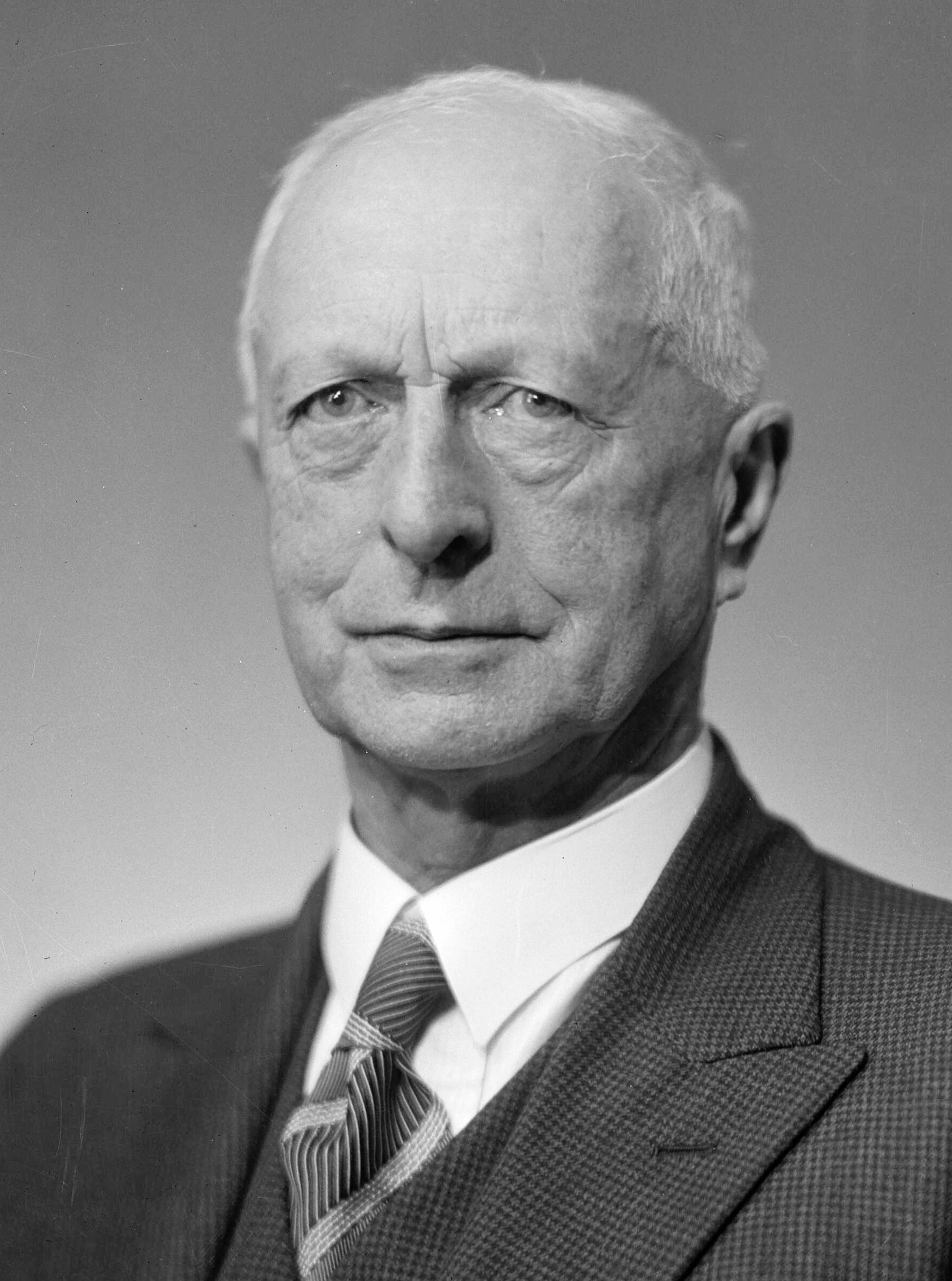
John Cobbe in 1936

John George Cobbe (1859 – 29 December 1944) was a New Zealand politician of the Liberal Party, United Party and the National Party.

== Early life ==
Cobbe was born in King's County, Ireland, in 1859. He received his education in Tullamore and Dublin, and arrived in New Zealand in 1886. He was first employed in Auckland by Smith & Caughey, and then moved to Feilding to run a general store. In 1941, he became a sheep farmer in the Waihapi Valley north of the Whanganui River.

== Politics and public offices ==
New Zealand Parliament
Years	Term	Electorate	Party
1928–1931	23rd	Oroua	United
1931–1935	24th	Oroua	United
1935–1936	25th	Oroua	United
1936–1938	Changed allegiance to:		National
1938–1943	26th	Manawatu	National

He represented the Oroua electorate from 1928 to 1938, having stood and come second in 1922 and 1925. In the 1931 election, Cobbe was returned unopposed. He then represented the Manawatu electorate from 1938 to 1943, when he retired.

He was a cabinet minister from 1928 to 1935 in the United Government and the Liberal-Reform coalition Government; Minister of Defence from 1929 to 1935, Minister of Justice from 1930 to 1935, Minister of Marine from 1928 to 1930 and 1931 to 1935, Minister of Immigration from 1928 to 1930, and Minister of Industries and Commerce from 1928 to 1929 in the Ward and Forbes Ministries of the United Government.

He held a large number of public offices. He was the first chairman of the Feilding Chamber of Commerce. He was chairman of directors of the Feilding Farmers' Freezing Company. From 1911 to 1929, he represented Manawatu on the Wellington Harbour Board. For a time, he was the chairman of the Harbour Boards' Association of New Zealand.

In 1935, he was awarded the King George V Silver Jubilee Medal.

== Family and death ==
Cobbe married Frances Amelia Elders, the daughter of Richard Elders of Phillipstown, Feilding. They had three sons, Ernest, Maurice, Richard, and one daughter. One son, Ernest Cobbe, died in action in Ypres, Belgium, in 1917; son, Maurice Cobbe, survived the war. His wife died during the 1935 election campaign on 24 November 1935. In December 1944, age 85, he died at a private hospital in Palmerston North and was buried in Feilding. Three great-great-grandchildren, Jon, Peter and Dann Hume were raised in Feilding where they formed a rock group, Evermore in 1999.

== Notes ==
Political offices
Preceded by Thomas Wilford	Minister of Police; 1929–1935	Succeeded by Peter Fraser
Preceded by Thomas Sidey	Minister of Justice; 1930–1935	Succeeded by Rex Mason
Preceded by Maurice Cohen	Chair of Wellington Harbour Board; 1927–1929	Succeeded by John William McEwan
New Zealand Parliament
Preceded by John Gordon Eliott	Member of Parliament for Oroua; 1928–1938	Constituency abolished
Preceded by Lorrie Hunter	Member of Parliament for Manawatu; 1938–1943	Succeeded by Matthew Oram
