= Heathcote Williams (cricket administrator) =

New Zealand lawyer, farmer and cricket administrator (1859-1931)

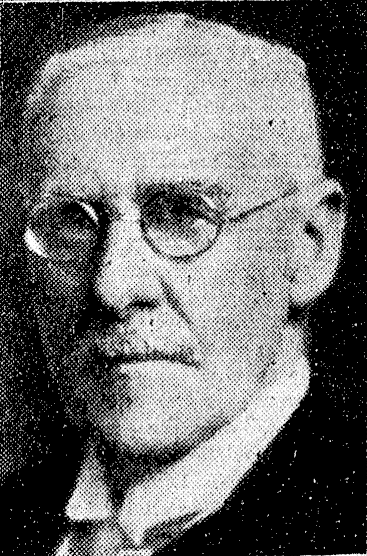

Personal information
- Full name: Edward Heathcote Williams
- Born: 23 March 1859; Pakaraka, Northland, New Zealand
- Died: 28 November 1931 (aged 72); Auckland, New Zealand
- Relatives: Henry Williams (grandfather); James Busby (grandfather); John William Williams (father); Kenneth Williams (brother); Agnes Williams (sister)

Domestic team information
- Years: Team
- 1891–92: Hawke's Bay

Career statistics
Competition	First-class
Matches	1
Runs scored	4
Batting average	4.00
100s/50s	0/0
Top score	4
Catches/stumpings	0/0
- Source: Cricinfo, 26 April 2022

Edward Heathcote Williams (23 March 1859 – 28 November 1931) was a New Zealand lawyer, farmer and cricket administrator.

== Early life and family ==
Heathcote Williams was one of 11 children, eight boys and three girls, to John William Williams and Sarah nee Busby. His father was a New Zealand politician, and his grandfather Henry Williams was a missionary who arrived in New Zealand in 1823. His maternal grandfather was James Busby, the British Resident in New Zealand, who arrived in 1833. One of his brothers, Kenneth, was also a New Zealand politician.

Williams was educated at Auckland Grammar School. After three years working in a bank in Wellington he was articled to a lawyer there. He was admitted as a barrister and solicitor in 1883, and began practising in Hastings in 1884. He opened an office in Napier in 1888. He was for many years the borough solicitor for Hastings.

== Cricket career ==
Heathcote Williams' playing record was modest – one first-class match for Hawke's Bay in 1891–92 when he captained his side to an innings victory over Taranaki – but he became one of the leading cricket administrators in New Zealand.

He was the president of the Hawke's Bay Cricket Association from 1892 until his death in 1931. In Christchurch on 27 December 1894, as a delegate from Hawke's Bay, he presided at a meeting of 12 delegates from around New Zealand at which the New Zealand Cricket Council was formed. He was elected the inaugural president. In all he served as president of the Council eight times.
