= List of ambassadors of New Zealand to Russia =

The Ambassador from New Zealand to Russia is New Zealand's foremost diplomatic representative in the Russian Federation, and in charge of New Zealand's diplomatic mission in Russia.

The New Zealand embassy is located in Moscow, Russia's capital city. New Zealand has maintained a resident ambassador in Russia since Russian independence in 1992. The Ambassador to Russia is concurrently accredited to Armenia, Belarus, Kazakhstan, Kyrgyzstan, Tajikistan, Turkmenistan, and Uzbekistan

== List of heads of mission ==
=== Ambassadors to Russia ===
- Jon Andrew (1991–1992) (impeached due to lack of citizenship proof)
- Gerald McGhie (1992–1993)
- Richard Woods (1993–1996)
- John Larkindale (1996–1999)
- Geoff Ward (1999–2003)
- Stuart Prior (2003–2006)
- Christopher Elder (2006–2009)
- Ian Hill (2009–2012)
- Hamish Cooper (2013–2016)
- Ian Hill (2016–2020 )
- Si’alei van Toor (2020–2022)
- Sarah Walsh (2022–present)

== See also ==
- New Zealand–Russia relations
- List of Ambassadors from New Zealand to the Soviet Union, for a list of chief diplomatic representatives in Moscow before 1992.
