= 1927 Raglan by-election =

New Zealand by-election

- 29 September 1927
- Turnout: 6,050 (98.47%)
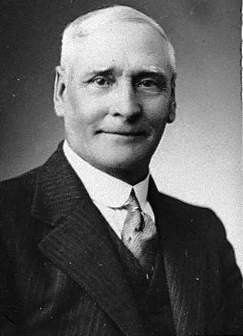

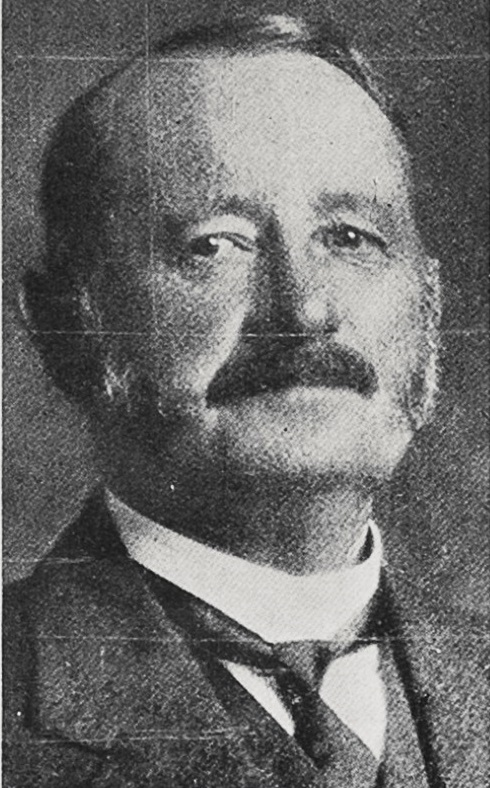

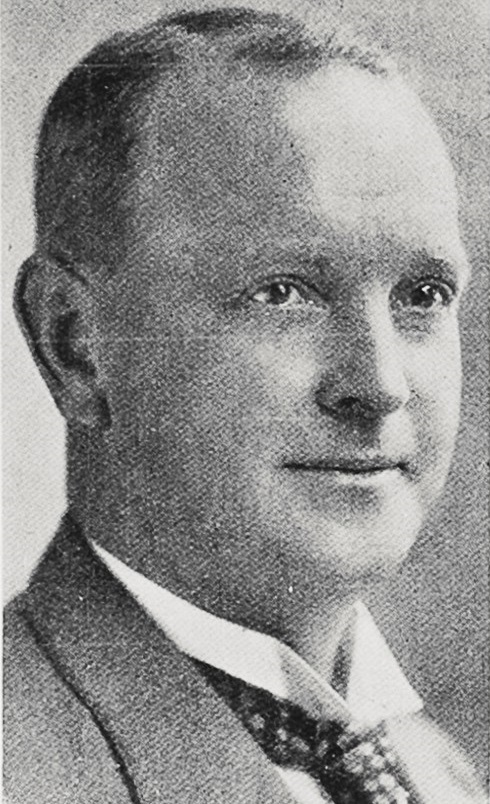
Candidate	Lee Martin	Harry Waring	Thomas Parker
Party	Labour	Reform	Liberal
Popular vote	2,200	2,025	1,095
Percentage	36.36	33.47	18.09
Member before election
Richard Bollard
Reform
Elected Member
Lee Martin
Labour

The Raglan by-election of 1927 was a by-election held in the Raglan electorate during the 22nd New Zealand Parliament, on 29 September 1927. It was caused by the death of incumbent MP Richard Bollard of the Reform Party. Despite being a local contest it quickly became a national contest in miniature due to growing discontent with the Reform Government.

== Background ==
=== Labour ===
Lee Martin, a farmer from Matangi, was selected by the Labour Party to contest the seat. He was president of the Waikato Farmers' Union and had contested the Hamilton electorate in 1925, where he placed second out of three candidates. Labour's candidate at the previous two elections—Ernest Piggott—announced his candidacy as an independent Labour candidate after losing the nomination to Martin. He later withdrew his candidacy. Following their stunning win at the Eden by-election the previous year, Labour were confident of winning.

=== Liberal ===
Samuel Charles Gale Lye, who contested Raglan for the Liberals in 1922 and 1925, declined to be a candidate again citing pressures of personal affairs. Thomas Parker was chosen for the by-election. Parker, a local sheep and dairy farmer and director of the Raglan Co-operative Dairy Company, had been chairman of the Raglan Town Board since 1917 and was also a member of the Raglan County Council. He professed to have received requests from all parts of the electorate that he stand as a candidate. Parker was endorsed by former Prime Minister Sir Joseph Ward who campaigned in the electorate for him.

=== Reform ===
The Reform Party had yet to streamline its candidate selection process which had caused it to lose the recent Eden by-election when official and "independent" Reformers competed against each other. Seven nominees came forward seeking the Reform nomination; E Allen, S. S. Allen, Campbell Johnstone, W. Seavill, S. G. R. Taylor, Harry Waring, Mervyn Wells. After addresses by each of the candidates three ballots were taken, the final of which gave a clear majority to Waring.

Waring was a former farmer from Taupiri who later established a butchery. He had been chairman of Bollard's campaign committee at previous elections. He had previously been president of the Waikato A. and P. Association and also president of the Raglan branch of the Reform Party. Marilyn Waring was to be his great-granddaughter.

=== Others ===
William James Taylor, who had previously been associated with the Reform Party announced his intention to contest the by-election as an independent candidate. He had been the chairman of the Tuakau Town Board since 1920.

== Campaign ==
The by-election was a disaster for the Reform Government of New Zealand. The rural seat was previously safe for Reform, but the party selected an inexperienced non-entity (Waring) who was opposed by an "independent Reform" candidate and a Liberal Party candidate; splitting the conservative vote. The Huntly coal-miners gave Labour's Martin a solid, dependable lack-lustre farmer their overwhelming support. Prime Minister Gordon Coates who had criss-crossed the electorate with three other ministers was humiliated; though Coates himself had drawn good crowds (800 in Waiuku).

== Results ==
The following table gives the election results:

1927 Raglan by-election
Party	Candidate	Votes	%	±%
Labour	Lee Martin	2,200	36.36	
Reform	Harry Waring	2,025	33.47	
Liberal	Thomas Parker	1,095	18.09	
Country Party	Cornelius Augustus Magner	532	8.79	
Independent	William James Taylor	198	3.27	
Informal votes		97	1.53	−0.77
Majority		175	2.89	
Turnout		6,050	98.47	+8.61
Registered electors		6,147		
Labour gain from Reform		Swing		

The election was won by Lee Martin with a majority of just 175, he carried only nine of the fifty booths. Martin won huge majorities among the coal mining areas in the Huntly district which carried the day for him. Labour's deputy leader Michael Joseph Savage had campaigned for Martin in Waiuku and Te Uku where Labour's vote increased from 31 to 80 and 2 to 38 respectively. The election was proclaimed a success for Labour's new farming policy (co-written by Savage) and Martin became the first farmer elected to Parliament as a Labour candidate.

Reform sympathetic newspapers such as The New Zealand Herald and The Press were critical of the vote splitting that was continuing to allow Labour to win seats with small majorities and on minority votes. The more impartial Auckland Star noted the impressive recuperation of votes by the Liberal Party.

== Aftermath ==
Martin held Raglan until 1931, when he was defeated by Stewart Reid but won the seat back in 1935. He remained MP for Raglan until 1943 when he retired.

Waring's great-granddaughter Marilyn Waring was later elected MP for Raglan (for the National Party) in 1975.
