= Mongonui and Bay of Islands (electorate) =

Coordinates: 35.219°S 174.198°E

Mongonui and Bay of Islands was a parliamentary electorate in the Far North District in the Northland region of New Zealand, from 1871 to 1881. It was represented by three Members of Parliament.

== Population centres ==
The 1870 electoral redistribution was undertaken by a parliamentary select committee based on population data from the 1867 New Zealand census. Eight sub-committees were formed, with two members each making decisions for their own province; thus members set their own electorate boundaries. The number of electorates was increased from 61 to 72, and Mongonui and Bay of Islands was one of the new electorates. It was formed from areas of two former electorates: the Mongonui electorate in its entirety, and the northern part of the Bay of Islands electorate. The southern part of the latter electorate was divided along an arbitrary, straight line just north of Hikurangi and added to the Marsden electorate. These changes became effective with the 1871 election.

Population centres that thus fell within the electorate included Kawakawa, Kaikohe, Russell, Kerikeri, Kaitaia, and Mangonui (which was spelled Mongonui before the 1880s). In the 1875 electoral redistribution, the electorate remained unaltered.

In the 1881 electoral redistribution, the Mongonui and Bay of Islands electorate was abolished and replaced with the Bay of Islands electorate. The only change was a slight adjustment of its boundary to the Marsden electorate, but the same population centres as listed above were covered by the new electorate.

== History ==
The first representative was John McLeod, who resigned in 1873. John William Williams won the resulting 1873 by-election and also held the electorate in the subsequent term. In the 1879 election, Williams was defeated by John Lundon, who held the electorate until it was abolished in 1881.

Lundon was defeated by Richard Hobbs standing in the Bay of Islands electorate in the 1881 election.

=== Members of Parliament ===
The Mongonui and Bay of Islands electorate was represented by three Members of Parliament.

Key

Independent

| Election | Winner |
|---|---|
| 1871 election | John McLeod |
| 1873 by-election | John William Williams |
| 1876 election | John William Williams |
| 1879 election | John Lundon |
(electorate abolished in 1881)

== 1873 by-election ==
1873 Mongonui and Bay of Islands by-election
| Party | Candidate | Votes | % | ±% |
|---|---|---|---|---|
| Independent | John William Williams | 119 | 50.85 | |
| Independent | John Lundon | 85 | 36.32 | |
| Independent | John Sangster Macfarlane | 30 | 12.82 | |
| Majority | | 34 | 14.53 | |
| Turnout | | 234 | | |
