= 1928 New Zealand general election =

Election of 1928

- 13 (Māori) & 14 November (general) 1928

All 80 seats in the House of Representatives 41 seats were needed for a majority
- Turnout: 88.01% ▼
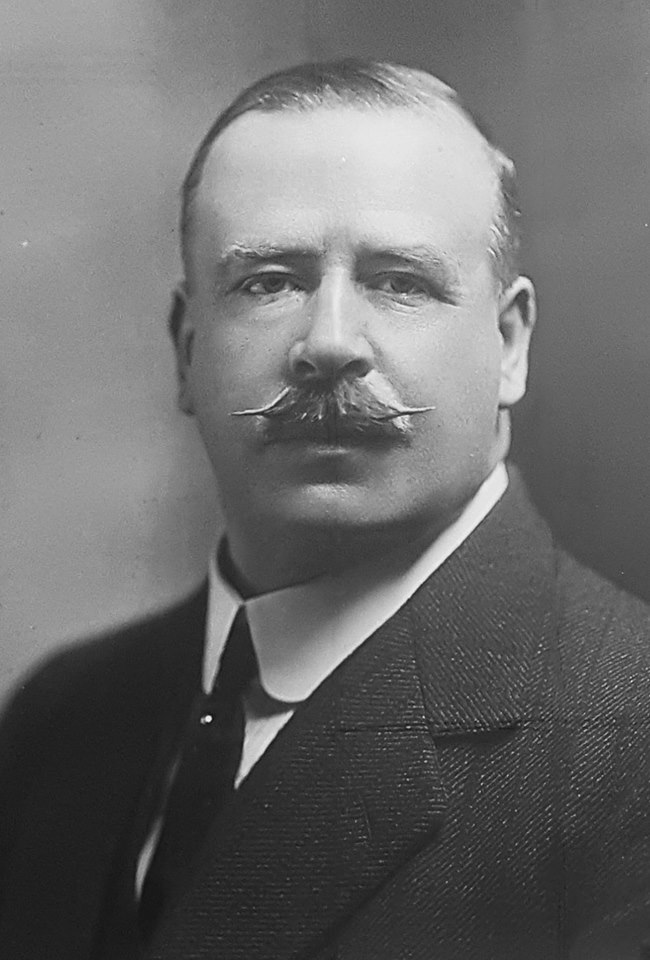

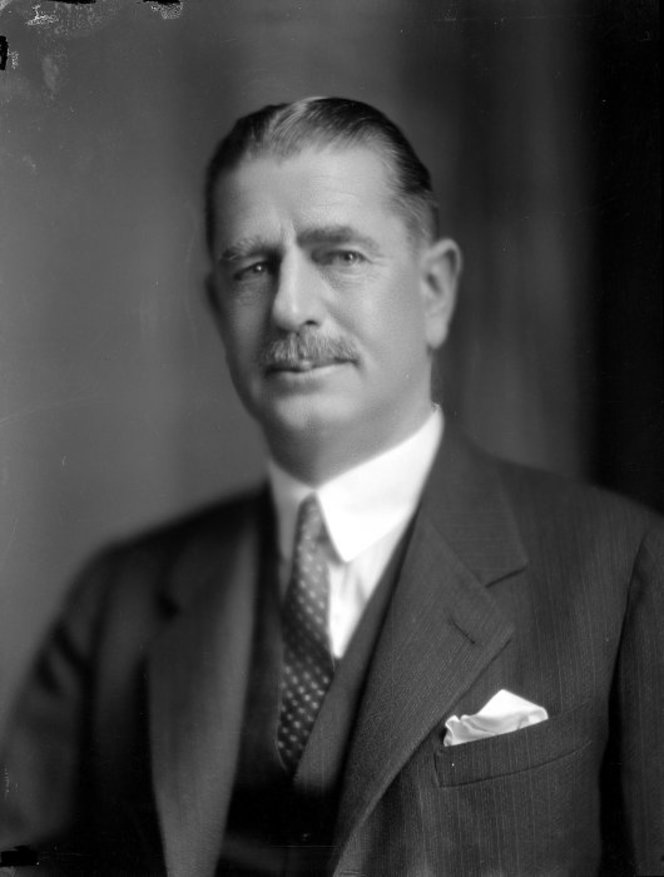

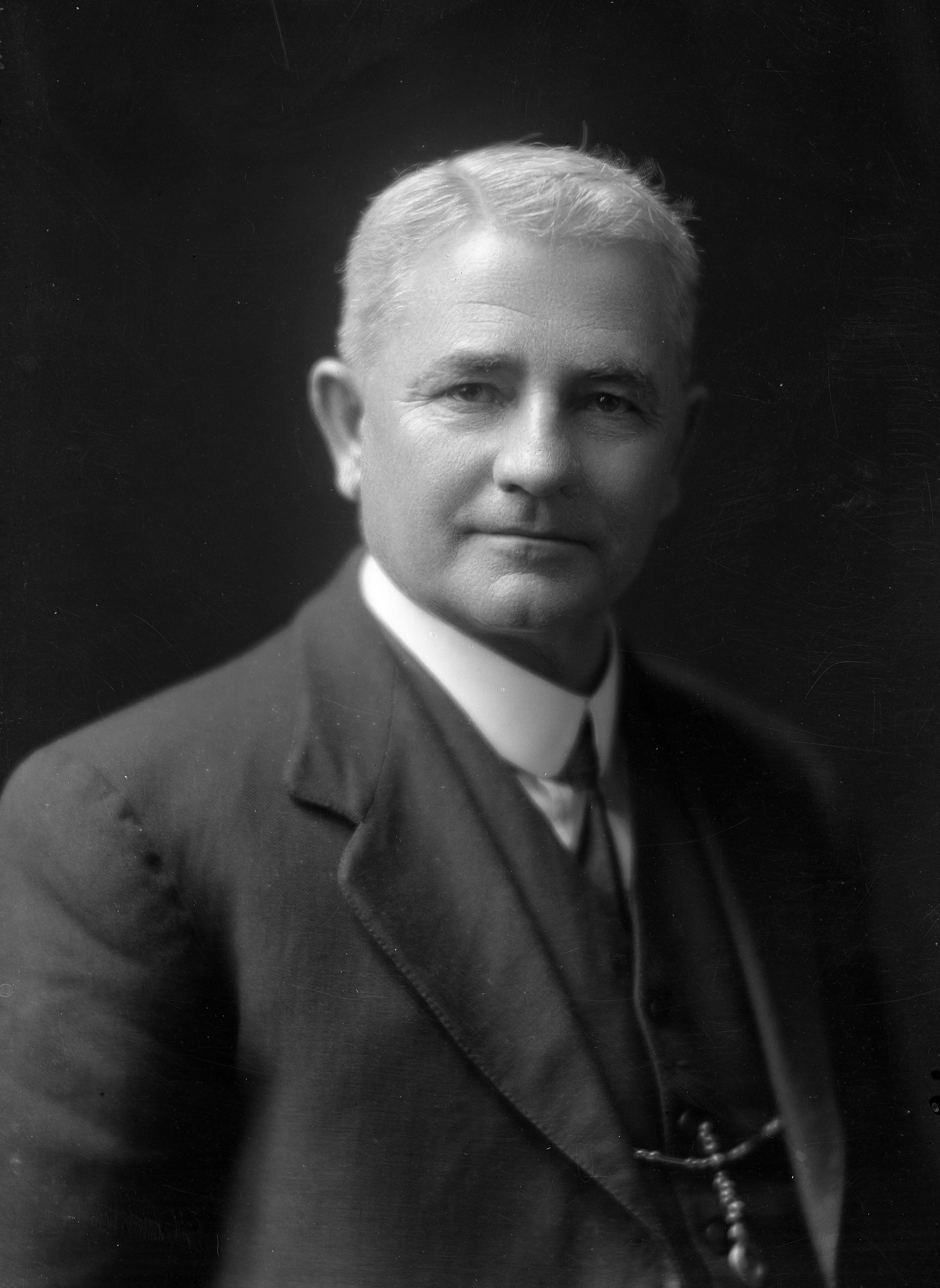

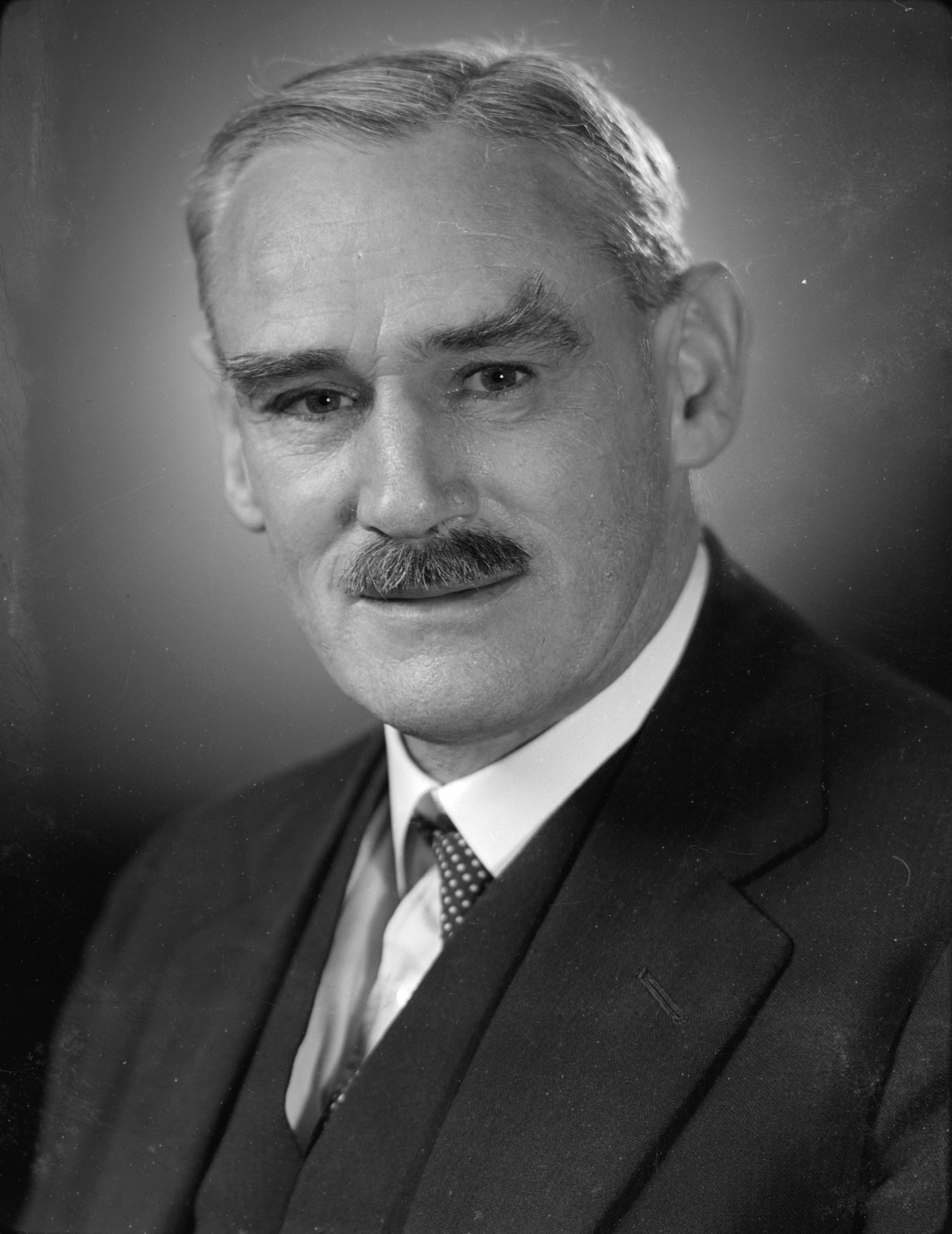
	First party	Second party
Leader	Sir Joseph Ward	Gordon Coates
Party	United	Reform
Leader since	17 September 1928	27 May 1925
Leader's seat	Invercargill	Kaipara
Last election	11 seats, 22.4%	55 seats, 47.7%
Seats won	27	28
Seat change	▲16	▼27
Popular vote	225,042	263,382
Percentage	29.75%	34.82%
Swing	▲7.26%	▼9.97%
	Third party	Fourth party
Leader	Harry Holland	Harold Rushworth
Party	Labour	Country Party
Leader since	27 August 1919	November 1928
Leader's seat	Buller	Bay of Islands
Last election	12 seats, 27.2%	0 seats, 0.3%
Seats won	19	1
Seat change	▲7	▲1
Popular vote	198,092	11,990
Percentage	26.19%	1.59%
Swing	▲3.50%	▲1.24%
- Results of the election.
Prime Minister before election
Gordon Coates
Reform
Subsequent Prime Minister
Joseph Ward
United

The 1928 New Zealand general election was held on 13 and 14 November in the Māori and European electorates, respectively, to elect 80 MPs to the 23rd session of the New Zealand Parliament.

1928 was the year postal voting was introduced for certain specified groups (e.g. invalids) who could not get to a polling booth on election day.

== The election ==
The 1928 election was held on Tuesday, 13 November in the Māori electorates, and on Wednesday, 14 November in the general electorates to elect a total of 80 MPs to the 23rd session of Parliament. A total of 844,633 electors were registered on the European roll, of which 743,691 (88.05%) turned out to vote. All 80 electorates were contested. 47 and 29 electorates were in the North Island and South Island, respectively, plus the 4 Māori electorates.

In 1927, a faction of the decaying Liberal Party formed a new organisation, which was eventually named the United Party. In 1928, to the considerable surprise of most observers and many members of the party itself, United won a considerable victory, taking Auckland East and Grey Lynn from Labour. The United Government came to power with Labour support. Labour, forming the official opposition since 1926, were thus replaced by Reform. Six Independents were elected (most with allegiances to the main parties. Four of these backed United, one supported Reform and one favoured neither.

The Bay of Islands electorate went to Harold Rushworth of the Country Party after a recount of the votes, but the election was declared void January 1929. Rushworth won the resulting by-election. This marked the Country Party's first entry into Parliament, where it would retain a presence until 1938.

== Result by party ==
Winning party by electorate.

The table below shows the result of the 1928 election.

Election results
Party	Candidates	Total votes	Percentage	Seats won	Change
Reform	74	271,259	35.87	28^{1}	-27
United	60	228,438	30.20	27^{2}	+16
Labour	59	197,953	26.17	19	+7
Country Party	5	11,990	1.59	1	+1
Ratana	3	4,924	0.65	0	±0
Independent	30	41,767	5.52	5	+3
Total	231	756,331		80	

^{1} Includes two who won as Independent Reform

^{2} United previously contested as Liberal

=== Votes summary ===
Popular Vote
Reform	35.87%
United	30.20%
Labour	26.17%
Country	1.59%
Ratana	0.65%
Independent	5.52%

Parliament seats
Reform	35.00%
United	33.75%
Labour	23.75%
Country	1.25%
Independent	6.25%

== Initial composition of the 23rd Parliament ==
The United Party was organised in the House of Representatives, prior to the dissolution of the 22nd Parliament.

The Auckland Star reported on 18 September 1928, that:

...the United Party were assembled yesterday in Wellington when Sir Joseph Ward accepted the leadership of the party. It had previously been decided, by unanimous resolution, that the party should go to the polls as "The United Party"...

The Evening Post newspaper reported on the same day that:

The Rt. Hon. Sir Joseph Ward took his seat as Leader of the United Party in the House of Representatives this afternoon, Mr G.W. Forbes, who has led the Nationalist Party up to the present, relinquishing his former place in favour of Sir Joseph. From now until the end of the session the Nationalist Party ceases to exist under that name.

Key

United Reform Labour Country Party Liberal–Labour Ratana Independent

Electorate results for the 1928 New Zealand general election
Electorate	Incumbent	Winner	Majority	Runner up
General electorates
Auckland Central	Bill Parry		3,024	William Hewitt
Auckland East	John A. Lee	James Donald	37	John A. Lee
Auckland Suburbs	New electorate	Rex Mason	1,098	Sir James Gunson
Auckland West	Michael Joseph Savage		1,341	Richard Speirs
Avon	Dan Sullivan		3,845	George Thomas Baker
Awarua	John Hamilton	Philip De La Perrelle	1,005	John Hamilton
Bay of Islands	Allen Bell	Harold Rushworth	2	Allen Bell
Bay of Plenty	Kenneth Williams		1,867	Alexander Moncur
Buller	Harry Holland		3,617	Dugald Robertson
Central Otago	New electorate	William Bodkin	653	James Ritchie
Chalmers	James Dickson	Alfred Ansell	619	Norman Hartley Campbell
Christchurch East	Tim Armstrong		2,260	Denis Franklyn Dennehy
Christchurch North	Henry Holland		1,892	Ernest Andrews
Christchurch South	Ted Howard		433	Charlie McCully
Clutha	Fred Waite		523	Joseph Stephens
Dunedin Central	Sir Charles Statham		1,771	John Robinson
Dunedin North	Harold Tapley	Jim Munro	1,231	Harold Tapley
Dunedin South	Thomas Sidey	William Taverner	33	Robert William Hall
Dunedin West	Downie Stewart		1,277	Cornelius Machin Moss
Eden	Rex Mason	Arthur Stallworthy	2,436	Vivian Potter
Egmont	Oswald Hawken	Charles Wilkinson	1,286	Oswald Hawken
Franklin	Ewen McLennan	Jack Massey	134	Harry Mellsop
Gisborne	Douglas Lysnar	Douglas Lysnar (Ind R)	346	David Coleman
Grey Lynn	Fred Bartram	John Fletcher	64	Fred Bartram
Hamilton	Alexander Young		1,073	Samuel Lye
Hauraki	New electorate	Arthur Hall	891	Ebenezer Allan
Hawke's Bay	Hugh Campbell		690	Jack Lyon
Hurunui	George Forbes		1,839	Leslie Macfarlane
Hutt	Thomas Wilford		1,305	Walter Nash
Invercargill	Sir Joseph Ward, Bt.		3,178	Morell Macalister
Kaiapoi	David Buddo	Richard Hawke	96	James Flesher
Kaipara	Gordon Coates		2,475	Jim Barclay
Lyttelton	James McCombs		1,867	John Beanland
Manawatu	Joseph Linklater		1,466	Patrick James Small
Manukau	Bill Jordan		3,659	Kells Mason
Marsden	William Jones	Alfred Murdoch	450	William Jones
Masterton	George Sykes		1,238	William Thompson
Mataura	George Anderson	David McDougall	62	George Anderson
Mid-Canterbury	New electorate	David Jones	55	Jeremiah Connolly
Motueka	Richard Hudson	George Black	613	Richard Hudson
Napier	John Mason	Bill Barnard	418	John Mason
Nelson	Harry Atmore		2,309	Frederick Smith
New Plymouth	New electorate	Sydney Smith	1,467	Charles Bellringer
Oamaru	Ernest Lee	Jack MacPherson	337	Ernest Lee
Oroua	John Eliott	John Cobbe	732	John Eliott
Otaki	William Field		813	Archie Sievwright
Pahiatua	Alfred Ransom		922	Harold Smith
Palmerston	Jimmy Nash		2,350	Walter Bromley
Parnell	James S. Dickson	Harry Jenkins	849	James S. Dickson
Patea	Harold Dickie		182	James Hislop
Raglan	Lee Martin		1,041	Walter Seavill
Rangitikei	Billy Glenn	James Hogan	1,234	Billy Glenn
Riccarton	Bert Kyle		45	Archibald McLachlan
Roskill	Vivian Potter	George Munns	2,344	Arthur Richards
Rotorua	Frank Hockly	Cecil Clinkard	200	Frank Hockly
Stratford	Edward Walter	William Polson	982	Edward Walter
Tauranga	Charles Macmillan		678	Douglas Chalmers
Temuka	Thomas Burnett		86	Bert Langford
Thames	Thomas Rhodes	Albert Samuel	1,302	John Montgomerie
Timaru	Frank Rolleston	Clyde Carr	467	Frank Rolleston
Waikato	Stewart Reid	Frederick Lye	86	Stewart Reid
Waimarino	Robbie Smith	Frank Langstone	985	Robbie Smith
Waipawa	Sir George Hunter		1,860	Ernest Albert Goodger
Wairarapa	Alex McLeod	Thomas McDonald	566	Alex McLeod
Wairau	William Girling	Edward Healy	292	William Girling
Waitaki	John Bitchener		1,202	Frederick Cooke
Waitemata	Alexander Harris		315	Reginald Greville
Waitomo	John Rolleston	Walter Broadfoot	532	John Rolleston
Wallace	Adam Hamilton		20	Walter Taylor
Wanganui	Bill Veitch		2,137	Bill Rogers
Wellington Central	Peter Fraser		3,458	Dunbar Sloane
Wellington East	Thomas Forsyth	Bob Semple	966	Thomas Forsyth
Wellington North	Sir John Luke	Charles Chapman	47	Sir John Luke
Wellington South	Robert McKeen		2,953	Martin Luckie
Wellington Suburbs	Robert Wright		1,985	Tom Brindle
Westland	Tom Seddon	James O'Brien	185	Tom Seddon
Māori electorates
Eastern Maori	Sir Āpirana Ngata		3,104	Pita Moko
Northern Maori	Taurekareka Hēnare		880	Paraire Karaka Paikea
Southern Maori	Henare Uru	Tuiti Makitānara	1	Eruera Tirikātene
Western Maori	Sir Māui Pōmare		1,599	Toko Ratana
