= 1920 Bay of Plenty by-election =

New Zealand by-election

The 1920 Bay of Plenty by-election was a by-election held in the Bay of Plenty electorate in the Bay of Plenty during the term of the 20th New Zealand Parliament on 30 September 1920.

After the death of William MacDonald of the Liberal Party he was replaced by Kenneth Williams of the Reform Party.

Frederick Lynsar, the Liberal candidate who lost to the Reform candidate, was Chairman of the Gisborne Harbour Board and an ex-chairman of the Cook County Council. He was described as a "staunch supporter" of James Carroll and William MacDonald. Lynsar was a brother of Douglas Lynsar, the Reform MP for Gisborne.

== Results ==
The following table gives the election results:

1920 Bay of Plenty by-election
Party	Candidate	Votes	%	±%
Reform	Kenneth Williams	2,381	57.93	
Liberal	Frederick John Lysnar	1,729	42.07	
Majority		652	15.86	
Turnout		4,110		
