= 1929 Bay of Islands by-election =

New Zealand by-election

- 10 April 1929
- Turnout: 8,331 (89.49%)
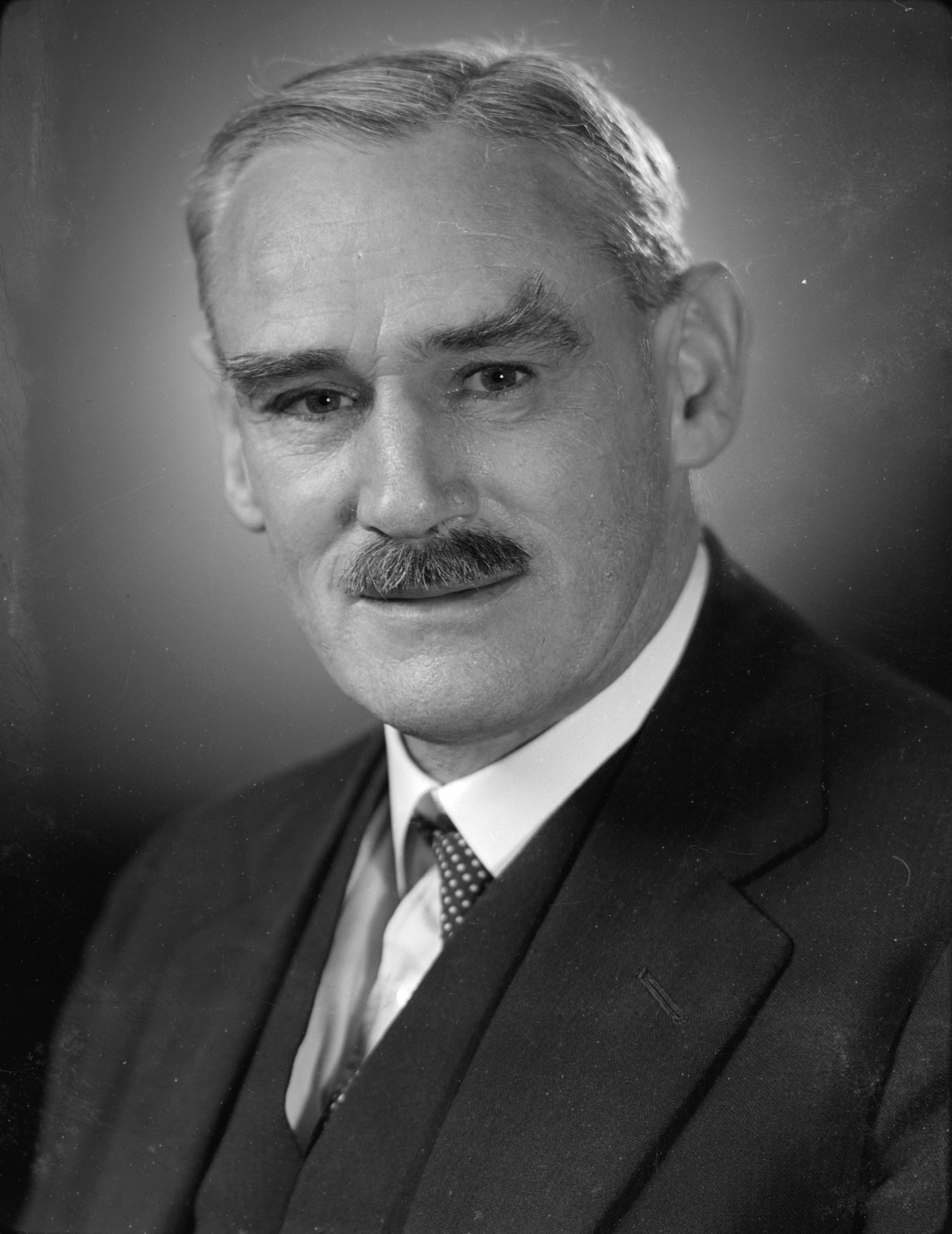

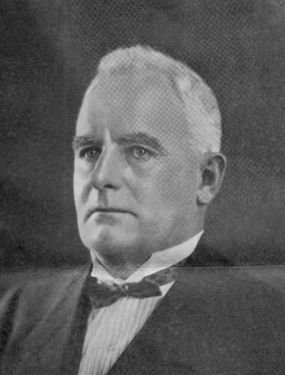
Candidate	Harold Rushworth	Allen Bell
Party	Country Party	Reform
Popular vote	4,385	3,911
Percentage	52.86%	47.14%
Member before election
Harold Rushworth
Country Party
Elected Member
Harold Rushworth
Country Party

The Bay of Islands by-election of 1929 was a by-election held on 10 April 1929 during the 22nd New Zealand Parliament in the Northland electorate of Bay of Islands. The by-election came about because Harold Rushworth's win in the general election of the previous year was declared void. The seat was won again by Harold Rushworth of the Country Party.

== General election ==
Harold Rushworth was originally declared the winner of the general election.

1928 general election: Bay of Islands
Party	Candidate	Votes	%	±%
Country Party	Harold Rushworth	3,820	47.83	
Reform	Allen Bell	3,818	47.80	−8.44
Liberal–Labour	Robert Hornblow	349	4.37	+0.72
Majority		2	0.03	−37.20
Informal votes		59	0.73	−0.26
Turnout		8,046	86.43	−3.58
Registered electors		9,309		

== Cause of by-election ==
Supporters of Allen Bell filed a petition to the electoral court complaining of voting irregularities. Bell, however, claimed that he would take no part in any attempts to upset the election, leaving it up to his supporters. This petition was ultimately successful and it was announced by the court that a by-election should take place for the seat.

== Selection process ==
Both Rushworth and Bell decided to run again for the seat.

The Labour Party refused to put up a candidate, believing that the two candidates who had tied with each other should compete in the by-election.

== Result ==
Rushworth won the by-election.

This by-election clearly created much interest as the turnout was higher here than it was at the general election. Rushworth's improved showing can be put down to the fact that he got most of the votes that were previously cast for Hornblow.

1929 Bay of Islands by-election
Party	Candidate	Votes	%	±%
Country Party	Harold Rushworth	4,385	52.86	+5.03
Reform	Allen Bell	3,911	47.14	−0.66
Majority		474	5.71	+5.69
Informal votes		35	0.42	−0.31
Turnout		8,331	89.49	+3.06
Country Party gain from Reform		Swing		
Registered electors		9,309		
