= Iris Martin =

Jessie Iris Martin MBE (19 December 1898 – 19 July 1982) was a New Zealand nurse, hospital matron, tutor and nurses' association leader. She was born in Wellington, New Zealand, on 19 December 1898. Her father was Lee Martin.

In 1953, Martin was awarded the Queen Elizabeth II Coronation Medal. In the 1955 Queen's Birthday Honours, she was appointed a Member of the Order of the British Empire, for services to nursing, and especially as matron of Cook Hospital in Gisborne.

Martin sought the Labour Party nomination for the 1959 Hamilton by-election, but was unsuccessful.
