= Harold Rushworth =

New Zealand politician

Captain Harold Rushworth
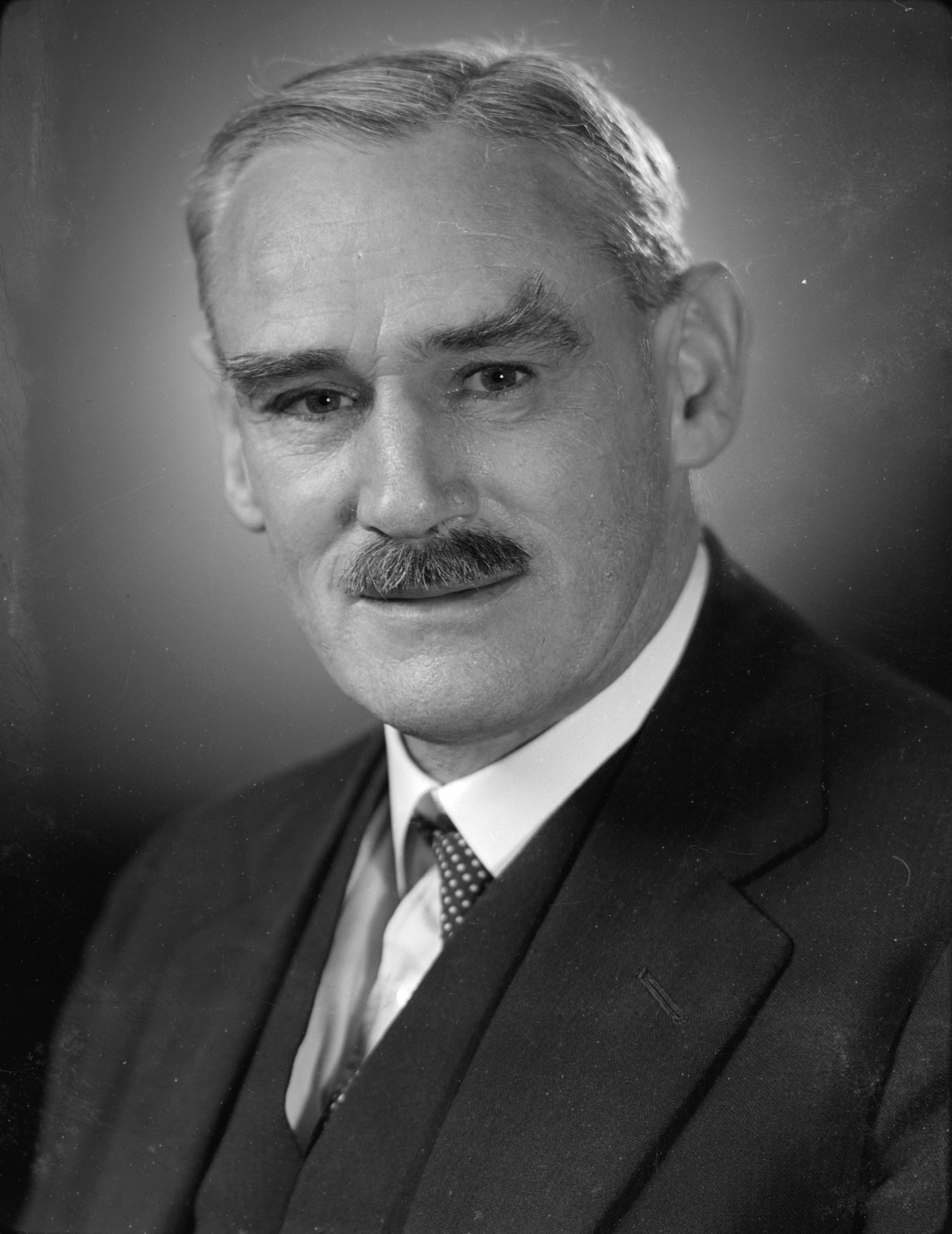
- Harold Rushworth in c. 1940

Member of the New Zealand Parliament for Bay of Islands
- In office 14 November 1928 – 15 October 1938
- Preceded by: Allen Bell
- Succeeded by: Charles Boswell

Personal details
- Born: 18 August 1880 Croydon, England
- Died: 25 April 1950 (aged 69) Castor Bay, Auckland
- Party: Country Party
- Spouse: Maud Rose Sylvia Hazel (married 24 August 1905)

Harold Montague Rushworth (18 August 1880 – 25 April 1950) was a New Zealand politician of the Country Party.

== Early life ==
Rushworth was born in Croydon, England and was educated at Rugby School and Jesus College, Oxford, graduating with a degree in law. He became a civil engineer and surveyor and worked for the London County Council from 1905 until 1914. Joining the 7th Battalion City of London regiment at the outbreak of the First World War. In September 1915 he was seriously wounded during the Battle of Loos and lost his right knee. Later in the war he learned to fly and joined the Royal Flying Corps but was shot down over Paschendale in August 1917. He was held captive for three months before being repatriated due to his injury. He emigrated to New Zealand in 1923.

== New Zealand politics ==
New Zealand Parliament
Years	Term	Electorate	Party
1928–29	23rd	Bay of Islands	Country Party
1929–31	23rd	Bay of Islands	Country Party
1931–35	24th	Bay of Islands	Country Party
1935–38	25th	Bay of Islands	Country Party

He started farming at Opua and became an active member of the New Zealand Farmers' Union, rising to become the leader of the Auckland Province. He was the Member of Parliament for the Bay of Islands electorate from 1929 to 1938, when he retired. He won the seat in 1928, but the result of the election was declared void on 28 January 1929. He then won the subsequent by-election for the seat on 10 April 1929.

Arthur Sexton was the other member of parliament for the Country Party, and he was defeated in 1938. The Country Party disappeared soon after the 1938 election, having lost their two seats. In 1935 Labour did not run candidates in those two seats; but they did in 1938.

In 1935, he was awarded the King George V Silver Jubilee Medal.

== Death ==
Harold Rushworth died on 25 April 1950 at Castor Bay, Auckland. He was survived by his wife, one son and two daughters.

New Zealand Parliament
Preceded by Allen Bell	Member of Parliament for Bay of Islands; 1928–1938	Succeeded by Charles Boswell
