= Bay of Islands (New Zealand electorate) =

Bay of Islands is a former New Zealand parliamentary electorate. It existed during various periods between 1853 and 1993. It was thus one of the original 24 electoral districts, and New Zealand's first ever MP was elected, although unopposed, in the Bay of Islands; Hugh Carleton thus liked to be called the Father of the House.

== Population centres ==
The previous electoral redistribution was undertaken in 1875 for the 1875–1876 election. In the six years since, New Zealand's European population had increased by 65%. In the 1881 electoral redistribution, the House of Representatives increased the number of European representatives to 91 (up from 84 since the 1875–76 election). The number of Māori electorates was held at four. The House further decided that electorates should not have more than one representative, which led to 35 new electorates being formed, and two electorates that had previously been abolished to be recreated, including Bay of Islands. This necessitated a major disruption to existing boundaries.

The electorate is centred on the Bay of Islands in the Northland Region, and includes the following population centres: Kerikeri.

== History ==
Hugh Carleton was elected to the seat in the first New Zealand Parliament in 1853. Although he was elected unopposed, he was the first MP elected and liked to be called Father of the House. He represented the seat until 1870, when he was defeated.

The Bay of Islands electorate existed from 1853 to 1870, then from 1881 to 1946 (when it was replaced by the Hobson electorate), then from 1978 to 1993, after which it became the Far North electorate. In 1996 it became the Northland electorate.

Members representing the electorate from 1881 to 1922 were Richard Hobbs 1881–1890 (retired), Robert Houston 1890–1908 (retired), Vernon Reed 1908–1915 (election declared void) and 1917–1922 (defeated), and William Stewart 1915–1917 (resigned). In 1929, Harold Rushworth, a Country Party member, had his 1928 election declared void, but he won the subsequent by-election.

The 1890 election was contested by Robert Houston, James Trounsen, John Lundon and Joseph Dargaville, and they received 465, 454, 385 and 352 votes, respectively. Houston, who represented the Liberal Party, was thus declared elected.

The 1893 election was contested by Houston (1431 votes), Trownson (1200 votes) and Dargaville (399 votes). The incumbent was thus re-elected.

The 1896 election was contested by Houston (1592 votes) and John Press (965 votes). The incumbent was again re-elected. Houston remained the electorate's representative until he retired at the 1908 election.

Houston was succeeded by Vernon Reed, who represented the Liberal Party in the 1908 and 1911 elections. The opposition candidate in 1908 was John Charles Johnson, and by 1911 the Reform Party had established itself and George Wilkinson was their candidate.

Harold Rushworth of the Country Party represented the electorate from the 1928 election onwards. For the 1935 election, the United Party chose Robert Boyd Russell as their candidate. On 7 October 1935, Russell died in a rifle accident on his farm. The United Party selected Clive Cameron as their replacement candidate.

=== Members of Parliament ===
Key

Independent Liberal Reform Country Party Labour National

Election	Winner
1853 election	Hugh Carleton
1855 election	Hugh Carleton
1861 election	Hugh Carleton
1866 election	Hugh Carleton
(Electorate abolished 1870–1881, see Mongonui and Bay of Islands)
1881 election	Richard Hobbs
1884 election	Richard Hobbs
1887 election	Richard Hobbs
1890 election	Robert Houston
1893 election	Robert Houston
1896 election	Robert Houston
1899 election	Robert Houston
1902 election	Robert Houston
1905 election	Robert Houston
1908 election	Vernon Reed
1911 election	Vernon Reed
1914 election	Vernon Reed
1915 by-election	William Stewart
1917 by-election	Vernon Reed
1919 election	Vernon Reed
1922 election	Allen Bell
1925 election	Allen Bell
1928 election	Harold Rushworth
1929 by-election	Harold Rushworth
1931 election	Harold Rushworth
1935 election	Harold Rushworth
1938 election	Charles Boswell
1943 election	Sid Smith
(Electorate abolished 1946–1978, see Hobson)
1978 election	Neill Austin
1981 election	Neill Austin
1984 election	Neill Austin
1987 election	John Carter
1990 election	John Carter
(Electorate abolished 1993)

== Election results ==
=== 1943 election ===
1943 general election: Bay of Islands
Party	Candidate	Votes	%	±%
National	Sid Smith	4,513	53.09	
Labour	Charles Boswell	3,237	38.08	−12.83
Democratic Labour	Charles Young	672	7.90	
Informal votes		78	0.91	−1.83
Majority		1,276	15.01	
Turnout		8,500	91.64	−1.90
Registered electors		9,275		

=== 1938 election ===
1938 general election: Bay of Islands
Party	Candidate	Votes	%	±%
Labour	Charles Boswell	4,556	50.91	
National	Harold Fisher Guy	4,393	49.09	
Informal votes		252	2.74	
Majority		163	1.82	−19.17
Turnout		9,201	93.54	
Registered electors		9,836		

=== 1935 election ===
1935 general election: Bay of Islands
Party	Candidate	Votes	%	±%
Country Party	Harold Rushworth	6,004	59.41	+2.49
United	Clive Cameron	3,883	38.42	
Independent Labour	Robert Hornblow	190	1.88	
Reform	J B Kennedy	28	0.27	
Majority		2,121	20.98	+7.13
Turnout		10,105		+13.49

=== 1931 election ===
1931 general election: Bay of Islands
Party	Candidate	Votes	%	±%
Country Party	Harold Rushworth	4,970	56.92	+4.07
Reform	Allen Bell	3,761	43.08	−4.07
Informal votes		25	0.29	−0.13
Majority		1,209	13.85	+8.13
Turnout		8,756	87.02	−2.47
Registered electors		10,062		

=== 1929 by-election ===
1929 Bay of Islands by-election
Party	Candidate	Votes	%	±%
Country Party	Harold Rushworth	4,385	52.86	+5.03
Reform	Allen Bell	3,911	47.14	−0.66
Majority		474	5.71	+5.69
Informal votes		35	0.42	−0.31
Turnout		8,331	89.49	+3.06
Country Party gain from Reform		Swing		
Registered electors		9,309		

=== 1928 election ===
1928 general election: Bay of Islands
Party	Candidate	Votes	%	±%
Country Party	Harold Rushworth	3,820	47.83	
Reform	Allen Bell	3,818	47.80	−8.44
Liberal–Labour	Robert Hornblow	349	4.37	+0.72
Majority		2	0.03	−37.20
Informal votes		59	0.73	−0.26
Turnout		8,046	86.43	−3.58
Registered electors		9,309		

=== 1925 election ===
1925 general election: Bay of Islands
Party	Candidate	Votes	%	±%
Reform	Allen Bell	4,211	56.24	+4.90
Country Party	Hugh James Sweeney	1,424	19.02	
Labour	Allan Edward Bisset	1,268	16.94	
Liberal	Richard Theophilus Wrathall (Note: Wrathall stood for the 'National Party', a splinter group of the Liberal Party)	311	4.15	
Liberal	Robert Hornblow	273	3.65	
Informal votes		75	0.99	−0.61
Majority		2,787	37.22	+34.53
Turnout		7,562	90.01	+3.79
Registered electors		8,401		

=== 1922 election ===
1922 general election: Bay of Islands
Party	Candidate	Votes	%	±%
Independent	Allen Bell	3,585	51.35	
Reform	Vernon Reed	3,397	48.65	−13.45
Informal votes		114	1.61	+0.48
Majority		188	2.69	−21.51
Turnout		7,096	86.22	+7.52
Registered electors		8,230		

=== 1919 election ===
1919 general election: Bay of Islands
Party	Candidate	Votes	%	±%
Reform	Vernon Reed	3,066	62.10	
Independent Liberal	St. Claire Jounneaux	1,871	37.90	
Informal votes		56	1.12	
Majority		1,195	24.20	
Turnout		4,993	78.70	
Registered electors		6,344		

=== 1915 by-election ===
1915 Bay of Islands by-election
Party	Candidate	Votes	%	±%
Reform	William Stewart	3,264	59.51	
Liberal	George Gardiner Menzies	2,221	40.49	
Majority		1,043	19.02	+17.25
Informal votes		6	0.11	−0.88
Turnout		5,491	75.98	−9.60
Reform gain from Liberal		Swing		
Registered electors		7,227		

=== 1914 election ===
1914 general election: Bay of Islands
Party	Candidate	Votes	%	±%
Reform	Vernon Reed	2,328	38.01	−13.76
Liberal	Peter Buck	2,220	36.25	
Reform	George Wilkinson (Note: George Wilkinson had been the official Reform Party candidate in the 1911 election whilst Vernon Reed had stood for the Liberal Party, but in 1914, Reed became the official candidate of the Reform Party.)	1,576	25.73	−22.49
Majority		108	1.76	−1.78
Informal votes		61	0.99	−0.11
Turnout		6,185	85.58	5.61
Registered electors		7,227		

Table footnotes:

=== 1911 election ===
1911 general election: Bay of Islands, first ballot
Party	Candidate	Votes	%	±%
Liberal	Vernon Reed	2,671	51.77	−1.37
Reform	George Wilkinson	2,488	48.23	
Informal votes		57	1.09	
Majority		183	3.55	−2.73
Turnout		5,216	79.98	+3.20
Registered electors		6,522		

=== 1908 election ===
1908 general election: Bay of Islands, first ballot
Party	Candidate	Votes	%	±%
Liberal	Vernon Reed	2,242	53.14	
Conservative	John Charles Johnson	1,977	46.86	
Majority		265	6.28	
Turnout		4,219	76.78	
Registered electors		5,495		

=== 1893 election ===
1893 general election: Bay of Islands
Party	Candidate	Votes	%	±%
Liberal	Robert Houston	1,431	47.23	+19.16
Conservative	James Trounsen	1,200	39.60	+12.19
Liberal	Joseph Dargaville	399	13.17	−8.08
Majority		231	7.62	+6.96
Turnout		3,030	61.64	+12.03
Registered electors		4,916		

=== 1890 election ===
1890 general election: Bay of Islands
Party	Candidate	Votes	%	±%
Liberal	Robert Houston	465	28.07	
Conservative	James Trounsen	454	27.41	
Liberal	John Lundon	385	23.24	
Liberal	Joseph Dargaville	352	21.25	
Majority		11	0.66	
Turnout		1,656	49.49	
Registered electors		3,346		

=== 1884 election ===
1884 general election: Bay of Islands
Party	Candidate	Votes	%	±%
Independent	Richard Hobbs	355	56.08	
Independent	Michael Gannon	198	31.28	
Independent	McKenzie	80	12.64	
Majority		157	24.80	
Turnout		633		
