= New Zealand–Russia relations =

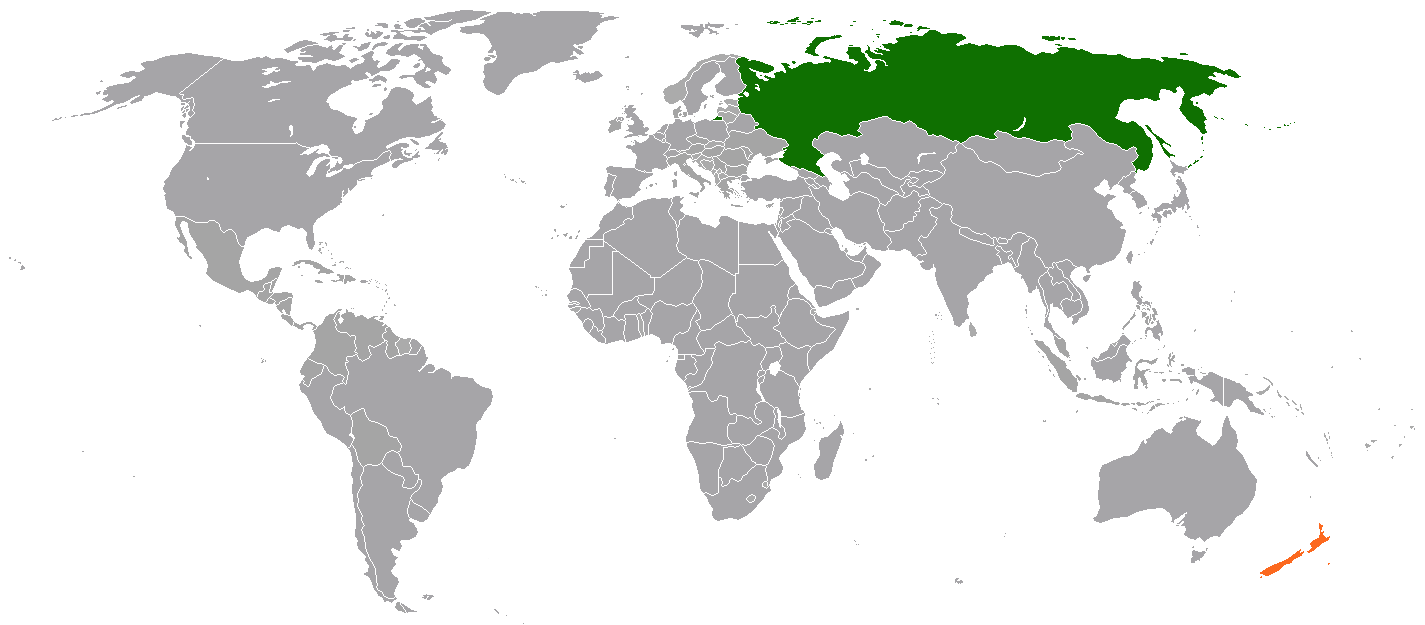

- Russia: New Zealand

New Zealand–Russia relations are the bilateral foreign relations between New Zealand and the Russian Federation. New Zealand has an embassy in Moscow and an honorary consulate in Vladivostok. Russia has an embassy in Wellington. Both countries are members of APEC. Due to the 2022 Russian invasion of Ukraine, relations became very tense after New Zealand imposed sanctions against Russia. Russia placed New Zealand on a list of "unfriendly countries", along with South Korea, the United States, (European Union members, NATO members,) Canada, Ukraine, Singapore, Japan, Switzerland, Micronesia, Taiwan and Australia.

== History of bilateral relations ==
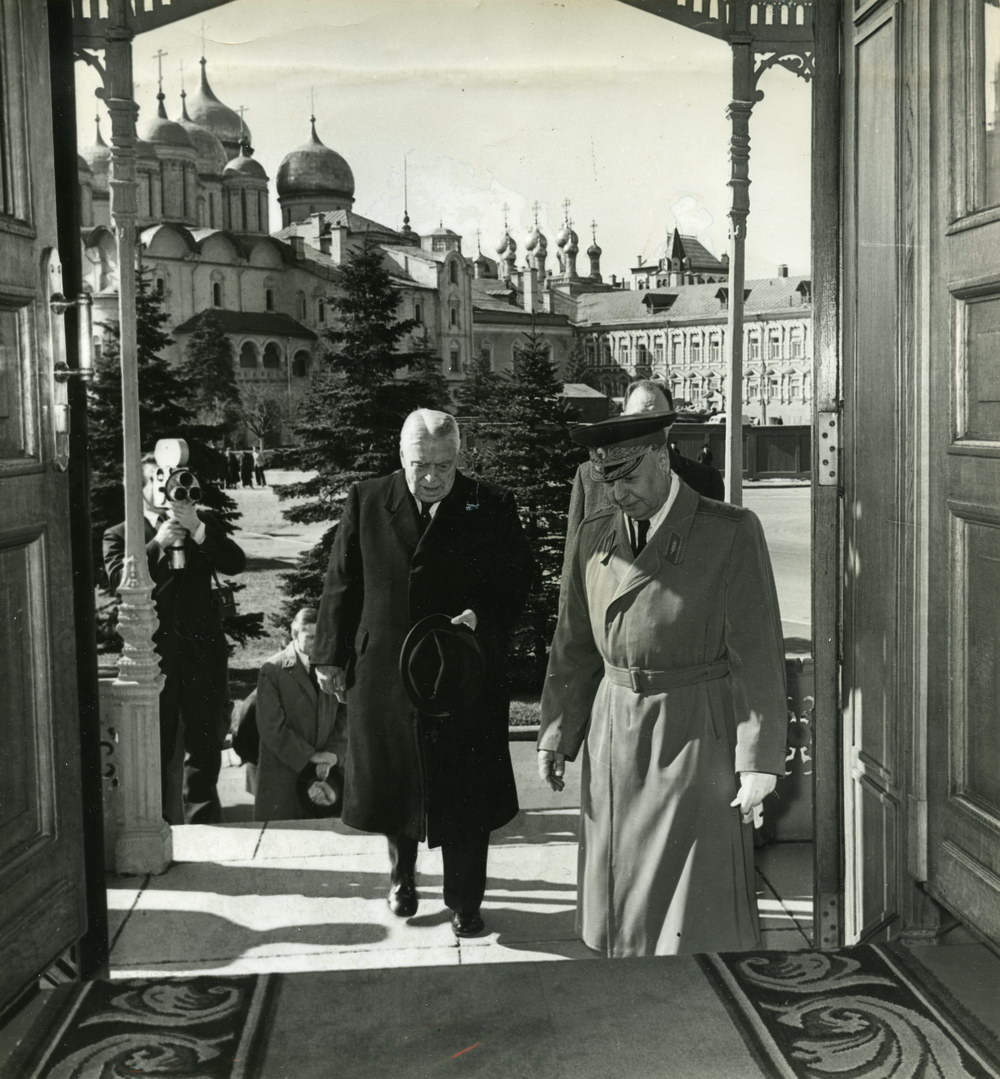
Walter Nash entering the Kremlin in April 1960

=== Russian Empire ===
Past relations with Imperial Russia were sometimes strained. In the nineteenth century the Russian Empire was seen as a threat to the British Empire, of which New Zealand was a loyal member. From 1870 to 1885, six separate incidents led to the prolonged Russian Scare period, where New Zealanders feared Russian invasion. Coastal fortifications were constructed in the 1880s because of the perceived threat, and an Auckland newspaper produced a sensation in 1873 by running a hoax story of an attack by a Russian warship called the Kaskowiski (a wordplay on "cask of whiskey") on Auckland and on a British ship in Auckland Harbour.

=== Soviet Union ===
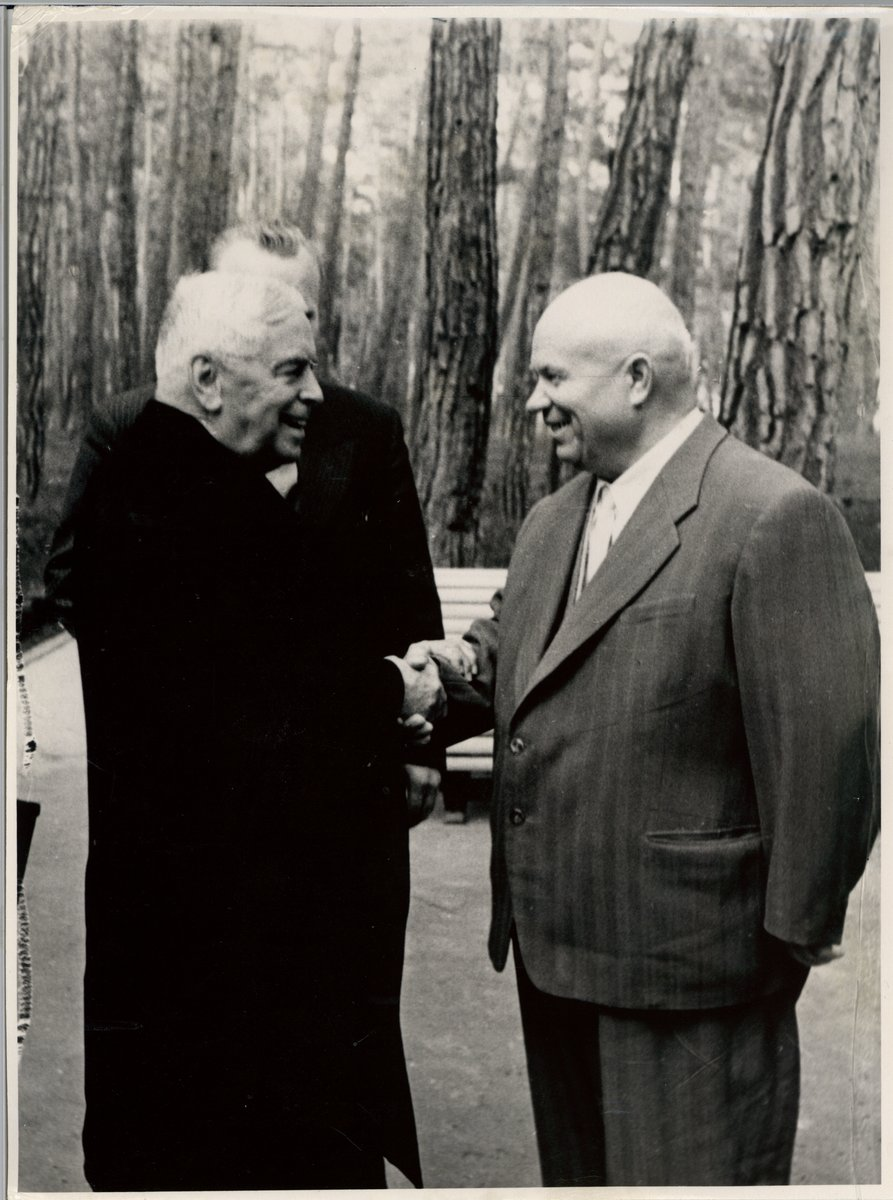
Walter Nash and Nikita Khrushchev, April 1960

In the twentieth century, relations continued to be mixed as Soviet politics were seen as subversive, with election cartoons showing sinister Bolshevik agents from the 1920s on. The influence of the local left-wing in trade unions was a theme of Robert Muldoon, the Prime Minister from 1975 to 1984. National won the 1975 election, helped by a television advertisement and the implication that Labour's proposed Superannuation scheme would lead to state control. In 1980 New Zealand sent a small rump team to the 1980 Summer Olympics in Moscow, although the government persuaded most local sporting bodies to join the boycott in protest of the Soviet–Afghan War.

Muldoon avoided any interference with trading relations; Gerald Hensley recalls that in 1979 the Soviet ambassador to New Zealand (Sofinsky): "broke a prime rule of the diplomatic game and in the absence of his KGB man .... handed over a subsidy to the Soviet-aligned Socialist Unity Party .... and was caught by our security service" and so was to be expelled. But Hensley was sent to London to check, as: "New Zealand sold large quantities of mutton (which few others would buy) and butter to the state trading corporations in Moscow and the Prime Minister wanted to take further advice on the risks to our trade." The British Foreign Office view was that "if we expelled Sofinsky the Russians would expel our ambassador but there the matter would rest unless we wished to take it further. It would take stronger measures than this to lead Moscow to imperil its purchases of food." Similarly an order for rolling stock (New Zealand EM class electric multiple unit) for the government-owned railways was placed with Hungary rather than Japan for balance-of-trade reasons. Additionally, Lada motor vehicles were widely distributed in New Zealand in the 1980s by the Dairy Board (now Fonterra).

=== Russian Federation ===
After the Soviet Union dissolved in 1991, bilateral trade between New Zealand and the Russian Federation slumped dramatically, but picked up again later in the decade.

In November 2010, New Zealand commenced negotiations to form a free trade agreement with the Russian Federation, Belarus, and Kazakhstan. These negotiations were suspended as a result of the Russo-Ukrainian war in 2014.

In early November 2017, it was reported that the New Zealand Foreign Minister Winston Peters would explore resuming trade negotiations with Russia. Peters is the leader of New Zealand First, a coalition partner in the Sixth Labour Government. Peters' proposal was criticized by European Union Ambassador Bernard Savage, who warned that the proposed free trade deal would complicate New Zealand–European Union relations. New Zealand Council of Trade Unions Director Bill Rosenberg also expressed concern about Russia's "poor" labour standards. Following the poisoning of Sergei and Yulia Skripal, these trade talks were suspended in March 2018.

==== 2022 Russian invasion of Ukraine ====
In response to the 2021–2022 Russo-Ukrainian crisis, New Zealand Minister of Foreign Affairs Nanaia Mahuta criticised the Russian military buildup on the Ukrainian border and supported Ukraine's sovereignty and territorial integrity. In addition, Prime Minister Jacinda Ardern warned that New Zealand was considering applying targeted sanctions against Russia. Following the Russian invasion of Ukraine, Ardern condemned Russia's invasion and called on Moscow to withdraw from Ukraine. In addition, NZ suspended high-level diplomatic contacts with Russia and introduced travel bans and export controls.

In response to the Russian invasion of Ukraine, the opposition National Party called for the expulsion of the Russian Ambassador and for the introduction of autonomous sanctions legislation. National also called for the Government to introduce a special humanitarian visa for Ukrainian refugees while the Greens called for the Government to offer expedited visas for relatives of Ukrainians residing in New Zealand and to take in 2,000 Ukrainian refugees. The Russian invasion of Ukraine also led to reports of bullying and intimidation against New Zealanders of Russian descent including the vandalism of a Russian Orthodox Church and Christchurch business, children being bullied, and a Russian singer having shows being canceled. In response, Race Relations Commissioner Meng Foon stated that Ukrainians and Russians living in New Zealand were "feeling the pain of what's happening with the war in Ukraine" and urged different communities "to be considerate, to be respectful and to be kind."

On 7 March, Ardern announced that the Government would be introducing a new Russia Sanctions Act 2022 to enable New Zealand to impose sanctions against Russia outside of the United Nations framework. Key provisions include freezing assets based in New Zealand; preventing people and companies from moving their money and assets to NZ in order to escape foreign sanctions; banning super yachts, ships and aircraft from entering New Zealand waters and airspace, and imposing a travel ban on 100 senior Russian officials. Ardern also indicated that this proposed bill would allow sanctions to be imposed on other states complicit with Russian aggression against Ukraine including Belarus.

On 7 March, the Russian state news agency Tass reported that the Russian Government had included New Zealand within a list of foreign states and territories that committed "unfriendly actions" against Russia, Russian companies, and Russian citizens. On 9 March, the Russian Sanctions Act passed into law with unanimous support in the New Zealand Parliament. On 28 March, the New Zealand Defence Force dispatched nine intelligence analysts to assist British and Belgian intelligence gathering work relating to the war in Ukraine.

In early April 2022, New Zealand imposed a 35% tariff on all imports from Russia and further restricted industrial exports to Russia. These actions fall within the framework of the Russia Sanctions Act. On 8 April, the Russian Government banned 130 New Zealand political figures, defence and intelligence officials from entering Russia including Ardern, all 120 Members of Parliament, Governor-General Cindy Kiro, New Zealand Security Intelligence Service (NZSIS) Director-General Rebecca Kitteridge, and New Zealand Defence Force (NZDF) Chief Air Marshal Kevin Short. The Russian Ministry of Foreign Affairs accused Wellington of pursuing a Russophobic foreign policy in the service of other Western powers. In mid-April, New Zealand dispatched a C-130 Hercules aircraft and 58 military personnel to Europe to assist with logistics and transportation in Ukraine.

On 30 June 2022, Mahuta and Attorney-General David Parker confirmed that New Zealand would support Ukraine's case at the International Court of Justice (ICJ) contesting Russia's claim that it had invaded Ukraine in response to alleged Ukrainian genocide in the Luhansk and Donetsk regions. This marked New Zealand's second international legal intervention in support of another country at the ICJ. In 2012, New Zealand had supported Australia's case against Japanese whaling at the ICJ.

On 28 February 2024, Foreign Minister Winston Peters announced a further tranche of sanctions against Russia including the G7's price cap on Russian oil imports, prohibiting the export of restricted items to Russia and Belarus via third countries and designating 61 companies and individuals for evading sanctions. In response to further sanctions, Russia issued a fourth list banning 36 New Zealanders including journalists, scholars, defence personnel, public servants and several mayors including Mayor of Wellington Tory Whanau and Mayor of Nelson Nick Smith.

On 28 November 2024, Peters announced a new tranche of sanctions targeting Russia's procurement of chemical weapons and missiles in response to the Organisation for the Prohibition of Chemical Weapons' findings that Russia was using illegal riot control agents in Ukraine. These sanctions also targeted Iranians involved in the supply of ballistic missiles and drones to Russia, as well as the Russians facilitating this trade. That same day, the Australian and New Zealand government had endorsed a joint Call to Action against Russian and North Korean shadow fleet activity. Following the 2024 Estlink 2 incident in late December 2024, the New Zealand government raised concerns with the Cook Islands government that its shipping registry was being used to help Russia's shadow fleet circumvent international sanctions and aid its war on Ukraine. The Cook Islands is an associated state of New Zealand; managing its own internal affairs while New Zealand manages its foreign affairs, disasters relief and defence.

In late July 2026, Russia's domestic intelligence agency, the Federal Security Bureau (FSB) arrested a 55-year old Russian man in Khabarovsk, alleging that the man used foreign email services and messaging apps to provide information relating to Russian national security to the NZSIS and its Five Eyes partners. The FSB and Russian Ambassador to New Zealand Stanislav Krans confirmed that Russian authorities were investigating the man for violating Article 275 (high treason) of the Russian Criminal Code. The NZSIS declined to comment on what "may or may not be an operational matter". Senior New Zealand officials including Prime Minister Christopher Luxon, Foreign Minister Winston Peters and Minister responsible for the NZSIS Chris Penk declined to comment and referred media inquiries to the NZSIS.

== Russian communities in New Zealand ==
The earliest Russian immigrants settled in New Zealand around the 1870s. Currently, there are about 15,000 ethnic Russians living in New Zealand.

There is a Russian school in Central Auckland that runs on Saturdays for the Russian community. Children can start from 3 years old and learn Russian, Math, History, Karate and other subjects.

Local Russians can enjoy Russian cuisine in a specialized shop called Skazka.

The newspaper Nasha Gavan keeps Russian updated about local news.

A bilingual Russian-English periodical New Zealand Russian monthly was published from 1995 to 2003.

== Trade and economic relations ==
Foreign Affairs Minister Winston Peters said in 2016 he wants to revive trade negotiations with Russia. Peters told reporters that New Zealand should be trading more with Russia, which was the world's number two dairy importer and was set to become the world's number two beef importer. In 2016, Russia imported $24.6 million worth of New Zealand red meat, the majority of it beef livers ($9.5m), chilled beef ($1.9m), beef hearts ($1.6m) and frozen beef ($1.4m).

== Resident diplomatic missions ==
- New Zealand has an embassy in Moscow.
- Russia has an embassy in Wellington.

== Notes ==
- The Embassy of New Zealand in Moscow is accredited to Armenia, Belarus, Kazakhstan, Kyrgyzstan, Tajikistan, Turkmenistan and Uzbekistan.

== See also ==
- Foreign relations of New Zealand
- Foreign relations of Russia
- Russian New Zealanders
- List of Ambassadors of New Zealand to Russia
- Category:Ambassadors of New Zealand to Russia
- Category:Ambassadors of Russia to New Zealand
- Pavlova
