= Frances Lysnar =

New Zealand traveller and writer (1864–1925)

Frances Brewer Lysnar (1864–1925) was a New Zealand traveller and writer and the first New Zealand woman to be made a Fellow of the Royal Geographical Society in 1913.

== Biography ==
Lysnar was born in 1864 in Auckland the eldest daughter of William Dean Lysnar and Frances (Fanny) Sarah Lysnar (née Brewer). She was known as 'Gypsy'. In 1872 the family moved to the Gisborne area where her father was a teacher and school headmaster at Manutūkē and later of a Māori school at Omahu in Hawke's Bay. Her brother was the politician Douglas Lysnar.

Fanny Lysnar suffered from a heart condition and in 1889 Lysnar accompanied her mother on a trip to England for treatment. From 1899 she travelled widely visiting the United Kingdom, Australia, the United States, Hawaii and the Pacific Islands. She became involved in missionary work and in the 1890s was lady superintendent in a medical missionary organisation in Melbourne. In the early 1900s she was secretary of the Women's Auxiliary of the Episcopal Church.

In 1913 the Royal Geographical Society started to readmit women as members after two decades of discussion; many of those women admitted were travellers or explorers. Lysnar was in London early in the year and was admitted in April 1913 becoming the first woman in New Zealand to be made a Fellow on the grounds of her extensive travel although she had not published anything at that time. Her book on Māori culture and customs and early New Zealand settler history New Zealand: the dear old Maori land was published in 1915 and republished in 1924.

In 1915 Lysnar travelled to India to the Mukti Mission for child widows and other outcast women and children set up by social reformer Pandita Ramabai. She did not return to New Zealand until 1918. During the war she travelled to France and to the United Kingdom where she assisted the war effort by working in the New Zealand Expeditionary Force convalescent camp at Hornchurch. After her time in India she continued to support the Mukti Mission by giving lectures in many places including California, Agra, the United Kingdom, Australia and New Zealand.

Lysnar died in Melbourne in 1925 while on a fundraising visit for the Mission.
