= Douglas Lysnar =

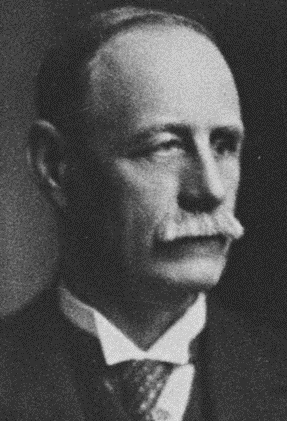
William Douglas Lysnar in 1928

William Douglas Lysnar (30 April 1867 – 12 October 1942), known as Douglas Lysnar, was a New Zealand politician of the Reform Party.

== Early life ==
He was born in Onehunga, Auckland, New Zealand on 30 April 1867. He was educated by his father, who was a school teacher. The family settled in Gisborne in 1879. His sister was Frances Lysnar who became the first woman in New Zealand to be a Fellow of the Royal Geographical Society.

== Political career ==
=== Local body politics ===
From 1908 to 1911, he was Mayor of Gisborne.

=== Member of Parliament ===
New Zealand Parliament
Years	Term	Electorate	Party
1919–1922	20th	Gisborne	Reform
1922–1925	21st	Gisborne	Reform
1925–1928	22nd	Gisborne	Reform
1928–1930	23rd	Gisborne	Reform
1930–1931	Changed allegiance to:		Independent

He represented the Gisborne electorate from 1919 to 1931, when he was defeated.

In the 1928 contest Lysnar stood as an independent supporter of the Reform Party and was successful. During 1930, he stopped supporting the Reform Party and became fully independent. At the following election in 1931 he ran as an independent, but was not returned, beaten by Labour's David Coleman.

In his 1919 campaign, he employed Albert Davy as organiser. Davy went on to be an effective organiser for the Reform Party, though disagreeing over policies.

Douglas Lynsar was a brother of Frederick J. Lynsar the Liberal candidate in the Bay of Plenty 1920 by-election, who lost to the Reform candidate.

In 1935, Lysnar was awarded the King George V Silver Jubilee Medal.

== Life in Gisborne ==
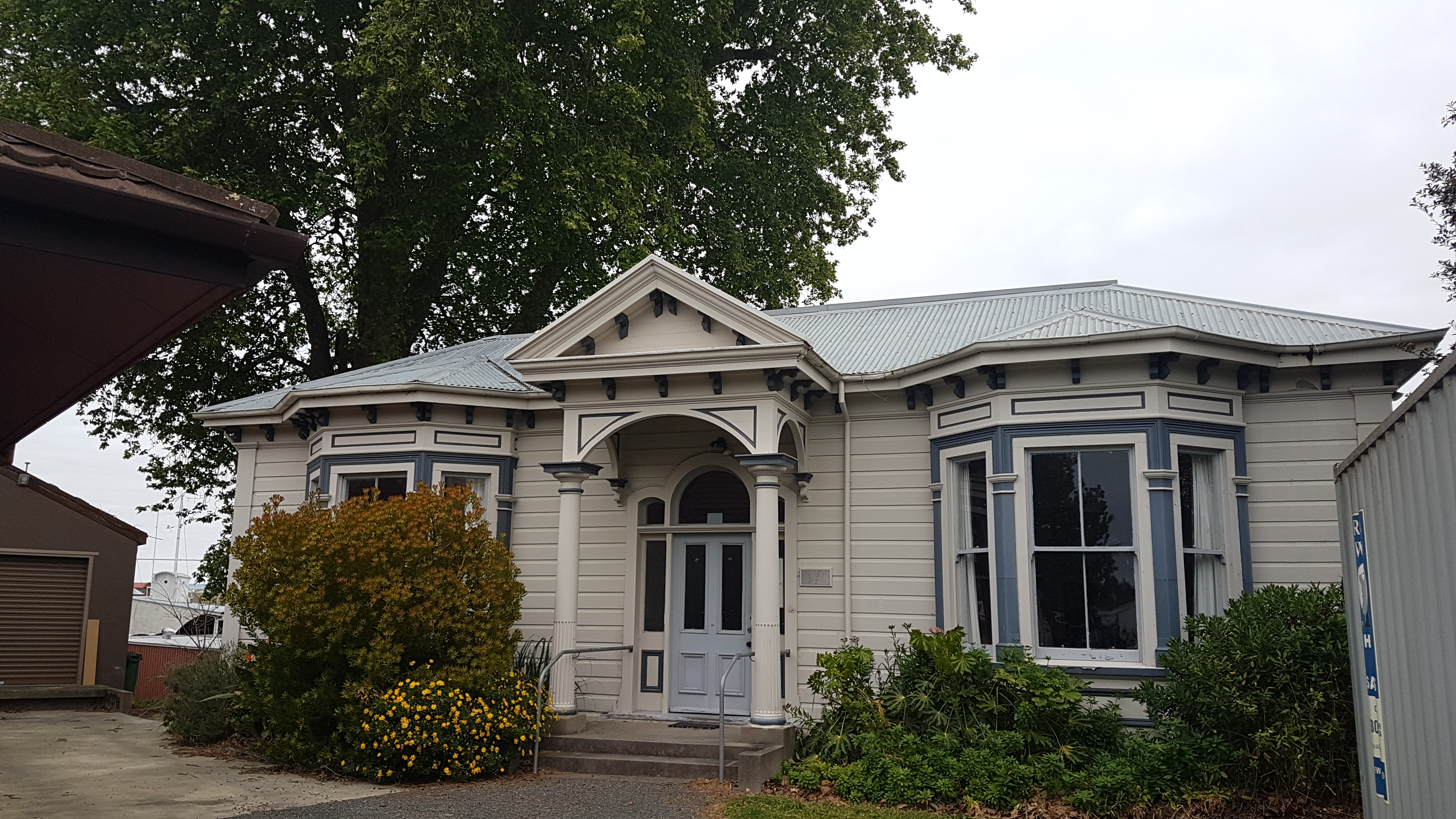
Kelvin Rise

The accountant James Charles Dunlop had a house built in 1886 that became known as Kelvin Rise. Dunlop got into difficulties and sold the house and associated land to Lysnar in 1898, who had it extended in 1900 and a ballroom and tower added in 1919. The house was "a hub of social activity in Gisborne", with various dignitaries entertained there over the years. Lysnar died on 12 October 1942 in Gisborne, and was buried at Makaraka Cemetery. According to his will, Kelvin Rise was to become a museum. Lysnar's daughter transferred the land to the council in 1954 for it to become a park and sold the house to the city for a nominal amount. Kelvin Rise opened as a museum and art gallery in 1955. The 1919 additions were split off in 1975 and moved to the city's marina and the remaining house relocated on the land to make room for a new museum building known as Tairāwhiti Museum.
