= Charles Boswell =

New Zealand politician

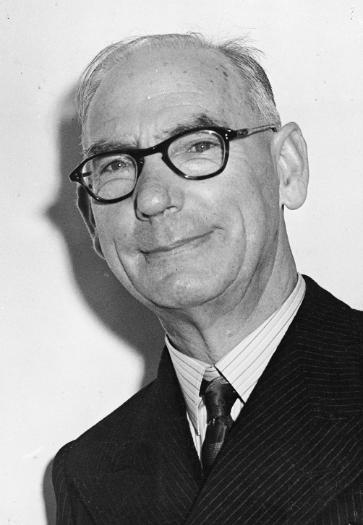

Member of the New Zealand Parliament for Bay of Islands
- In office 15 October 1938 – 25 September 1943
- Preceded by: Harold Rushworth
- Succeeded by: Sid Smith

Personal details
- Born: Charles Wallace Boswell; 5 August 1886 Coromandel, New Zealand
- Died: 17 June 1956 (aged 69) Auckland, New Zealand
- Party: Labour
- Spouse: Jean Smith (m. 1912)
- Children: 1
- Education: University of Auckland

Charles Wallace Boswell (5 August 1886 – 17 June 1956) was a New Zealand politician of the Labour Party.

== Biography ==
=== Early life and career ===
Boswell was the son of a pioneer family and was born in the Coromandel. He went to school at Driving Creek and played senior grade rugby and cricket in his youth. He attended University of Auckland and graduated with a Master of Arts. He married Emma Adelaide Beatrice (Jean) Smith on 16 January 1912 with whom he had one son.

He then spent many years as a teacher before becoming the headmaster of Kawakawa District High School. He was also an active trade unionist and was an executive member of the New Zealand Educational Institute.

=== Political career ===
New Zealand Parliament
Years	Term	Electorate	Party
1938–1943	26th	Bay of Islands	Labour

He joined the Labour Party and became an organiser. He founded branches in Thames and Kawakawa and was elected chairman of the Bay of Islands electorate committee. In 1939 he was elected a member of the executive of the Labour Party.

He represented the Bay of Islands electorate from 1938 to 1943, when he was defeated by National's Sid Smith.

=== Diplomatic career ===
He was then appointed by Peter Fraser as the (first and only) Minister in charge of the Moscow Embassy in the USSR from 1944 to 1950. He declined to report to some clerk in External Affairs, writing instead personal letters to the Prime Minister (which secretly Fraser rather enjoyed). His appointment (and that of Jim Barclay) attracted criticism as political appointments, as did his ordering of seven suits when clothing was rationed. But this was eclipsed by the "great furniture scandal" of items to be shipped from New Zealand to Moscow (via Tehran and Central Asia) for the new Legation, including 40 armchairs, 10 couches and a billiard table plus palm stands. The order dreamed up by the Public Works Department and which could have seated almost the entire House of Representatives was cancelled by Fraser.

=== Later life and death ===
When he returned from Moscow he wrote frequently of his experiences and impressions there and was critical of the Soviet way of life.

Boswell died in Auckland on 17 June 1956, aged 69, following a long illness. He was survived by his wife and son.

== Notes ==
New Zealand Parliament
Preceded by Harold Rushworth	Member of Parliament for Bay of Islands; 1938–1943	Succeeded by Sid Smith
Diplomatic posts
New title	Minister to the Soviet Union; 1944–1950	Vacant Post recreated in 1974 Title next held by Brian Lendrum
