= Liberal Reform Party (New Zealand) =

- Leader: Cliff Emeny
- Founded: 14 June 1970
- Dissolved: c. 1976
- Ideology: Classical Liberalism
- Political position: Centre-right
- Slogan: The wings of freedom, the scales of justice

The Liberal Reform Party was a rural based political party in New Zealand. It was the successor to the Country Party that contested the 1969 election.

== History ==
The party was launched as a revival of the decades earlier Country Party by the New Zealand Free Enterprise Movement in 1968 feeling that voters needed a genuine free enterprise choice in elections as, in their view, New Zealand was caught between monopoly business interests and overly empowered trade unions. It changed its name to Liberal Reform in 1970. The party criticised the then Finance Minister Robert Muldoon as a "socialist dictator" and campaigned for the abolition of taxation.

The Liberal Reform Party main goals were individual freedom, self reliance and maximised free enterprise. In addition it had other policy platforms it campaigned on:

1. To create a written constitution
2. Reducing government spending to control inflation
3. To hold a referendum on the issue of compulsory unionism
4. Establishing a petition system to allow electors to challenge legislation between elections
5. The abolition of payroll tax, death duties and gift duties
6. Incentivising students to attend technical institutes rather than universities

The party supported sporting links with apartheid South Africa.

The party planned to run 40 candidates at the 1972 election, but stood only 16. It performed poorly, winning only 0.29% of the vote with all candidates losing their deposits.

Ahead of the 1975 election, party leader Cliff Emeny announced the party would not stand any candidates due to the recent reduction of the voting age and a government plan to greatly increase the number of seats.
