= John William Williams =

New Zealand politician (1827–1904)

Member of Parliament for Mongonui and Bay of Islands
- In office 1873–1879
- Preceded by: John McLeod
- Succeeded by: John Lundon

Personal details
- Born: 6 April 1827 Paihia, Bay of Islands, New Zealand
- Died: 27 April 1904 (aged 77) Napier, New Zealand
- Party: Independent
- Spouse: Sarah Busby
- Children: 11
- Parents: Henry Williams (father); Marianne Coldham (mother)
- Relatives: Agnes Williams (daughter); Kenneth Williams (son); Heathcote Williams (son)

John William Williams (6 April 1827 – 27 April 1904) was a 19th-century Member of Parliament from Northland, New Zealand.

Williams was born in Paihia on 6 April 1827. He was one of the sons of Marianne Williams and the pioneering New Zealand missionary Archdeacon Henry Williams.

Williams was elected to represent the Bay of Islands electorate in the Auckland Provincial Council from 23 Jan 1863 to 13 Sep 1865. He represented the Mongonui and Bay of Islands electorate in the House of Representatives from 1873 to 1879, when he was defeated.

He married Sarah Busby (1835–1913), daughter of James Busby. They had 11 children including Agnes Williams, the politician Kenneth Williams, and the lawyer and cricket administrator Heathcote Williams.

He died at his residence in Napier's Cameron Road on 27 April 1904.

New Zealand Parliament
Years	Term	Electorate	Party
1873–1875	5th	Mongonui and Bay of Islands	Independent
1876–1879	6th	Mongonui and Bay of Islands	Independent

New Zealand Parliament
Preceded by John McLeod	Member of Parliament for Mongonui and Bay of Islands; 1873–1879	Succeeded by John Lundon
