= John Larkindale =

New Zealand public servant and diplomat

John Larkindale QSO

New Zealand Ambassador to the Russian Federation
- In office 1996–1999
- Preceded by: Richard Woods
- Succeeded by: Geoff Ward

New Zealand High Commissioner to Australia
- In office 2006–2011
- Preceded by: Kate Lackey
- Succeeded by: Martyn Dunne

Personal details
- Born: John Peter Larkindale; 1946 (age 79–80) Wellington, New Zealand
- Scientific career
- Education: McGill University
- Thesis: Spectroscopic and theoretical studies of charge-transfer complexes (1971)
- Doctoral advisor: David J. Simkin

John Peter Larkindale QSO (born 1946) is a New Zealand former public servant and diplomat, whose overseas postings including ambassador to the Russian Federation and high commissioner to Australia.

== Biography ==
Larkindale was born in Wellington in 1946, to Robert and Liesel, Jewish migrants from Germany. Larkindale was educated at Wellington College. He then studied chemistry at Victoria University of Wellington, graduating BSc and then MSc(Hons). His 1968 master's thesis, supervised by Alan Freeman, was titled Some intercalation compounds of boron nitride. Larkindale was awarded an 1851 Exhibition Scholarship, and he went on to complete a PhD at McGill University in Canada in 1971. His doctoral thesis, supervised by David J. Simkin, was titled Spectroscopic and theoretical studies of charge-transfer complexes.

Larkindale joined the staff of the Ministry of Foreign Affairs in 1972, and had postings to New Zealand's embassies in Vienna and Washington. He then served as the director of Pacific aid, based in Wellington and, later, Tokelau official secretary. Subsequently, he was the deputy head of mission in Beijing and then London. In 1994, he was appointed executive director of the Commonwealth Heads of Government (CHOGM) task force, responsible for organising the CHOGM summit held in Auckland the following year.

In the 1996 New Year Honours, Larkindale was appointed a Companion of the Queen's Service Order for public services.

Between 1996 and 1999, Larkindale was the New Zealand ambassador to the Russian Federation. Returning to Wellington, he was appointed deputy secretary of the Ministry of Foreign Affairs and Trade. Larkindale's final diplomatic appointment was as high commissioner to Australia, in which role he served from 2006 until his retirement in 2011.

Larkindale became a member of the board of the Institute of Public Administration New Zealand (IPANZ) in 2012, and in March 2013 he was elected president of IPANZ.
