= 1873 Mongonui and Bay of Islands by-election =

New Zealand by-election

The 1873 Mongonui and Bay of Islands by-election was held on 24 July 1873 in the Mongonui and Bay of Islands electorate in Northland during the 5th New Zealand Parliament after the sitting member, John McLeod, resigned. The by-election was won by John William Williams.

John Macfarlane, one of the other candidates, denied that he had paid McLeod £200 to resign.

== Results ==
1873 Mongonui and Bay of Islands by-election
Party	Candidate	Votes	%	±%
Independent	John William Williams	119	50.85	
Independent	John Lundon	85	36.32	
Independent	John Sangster Macfarlane	30	12.82	
Majority		34	14.53	
Turnout		234		
