= Oroua (electorate) =

Oroua was a parliamentary electorate in the Manawatū-Whanganui region of New Zealand from 1902 to 1938.

== Population centres ==
The Representation Act 1900 had increased the membership of the House of Representatives from general electorates 70 to 76, and this was implemented through the 1902 electoral redistribution. In 1902, changes to the country quota affected the three-member electorates in the four main centres. The tolerance between electorates was increased to ±1,250 so that the Representation Commissions (since 1896, there had been separate commissions for the North and South Islands) could take greater account of communities of interest. These changes proved very disruptive to existing boundaries, and six electorates were established for the first time, including Oroua, and two electorates that previously existed were re-established.

In the 1902 election, polling booths were in Feilding, Halcombe, Kimbolton, Ruahine, Pohangina, Ashhurst, and other places.

In the 1907 electoral redistribution, a major change that had to be allowed for was a reduction of the tolerance to ±750 to those electorates where the country quota applied. The North Island had once again a higher population growth than the South Island, and three seats were transferred from south to north. In the resulting boundary distribution, every existing electorate was affected, and some were abolished, including the Oroua electorate. These changes took effect with the 1908 election.

== History ==
The electorate was first created for the 1902 election. Frank Lethbridge won the 1902 election against Arthur Henry Tompkins. Lethbridge had since the 1896 election represented the Rangitikei electorate. When he retired in 1908, David Guthrie became the next representative. Guthrie joined the Reform Party when it formed in 1909 and held the Oroua electorate until he retired in 1925.

John Gordon Eliott of the Reform Party succeeded Guthrie in the 1925 election and represented Oroua for one parliamentary term, as he was defeated by John Cobbe of the United Party in the 1928 election. Cobbe became part of the National Party when the United and Reform Parties amalgamated in 1936. Cobbe held the electorate until it was abolished in 1938, and then continued to represent the Manawatu electorate.

=== Election results ===
The electorate was represented by four Members of Parliament:

Key

Conservative	Reform	United	National

Election	Winner
1902 election	Frank Lethbridge
1905 election	Frank Lethbridge
1908 election	David Guthrie
1911 election	David Guthrie
1914 election	David Guthrie
1919 election	David Guthrie
1922 election	David Guthrie
1925 election	John Gordon Eliott
1928 election	John Cobbe
1931 election	John Cobbe
1935 election	John Cobbe
(Electorate abolished 1938; see Manawatu)

== Election results ==
=== 1935 election ===
1935 general election: Oroua
Party	Candidate	Votes	%	±%
United	John Cobbe	4,716	53.87	
Labour	William Henry Oliver	2,383	27.22	
Democrat	Ernest Fair	1,620	18.50	
Majority		2,333	26.65	
Informal votes		35	0.39	
Turnout		8,754		

=== 1928 election ===
1928 general election: Oroua
Party	Candidate	Votes	%	±%
United	John Cobbe	4,411	54.52	
Reform	John Gordon Eliott	3,679	45.48	
Majority		732	9.05	
Informal votes		76	0.93	
Turnout		8,166	89.44	
Registered electors		9,130		
