= Lee Martin (politician) =

New Zealand politician

The Honourable Lee Martin
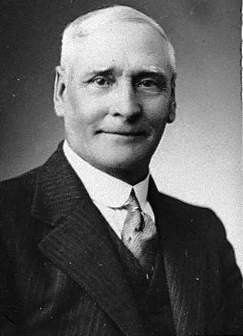

15th Minister of Agriculture
- In office 6 December 1935 – 21 January 1941
- Prime Minister: Michael Joseph Savage; Peter Fraser
- Preceded by: Charles Macmillan
- Succeeded by: Jim Barclay

Member of the New Zealand Parliament for Raglan
- In office 29 September 1927 – 2 December 1931
- Preceded by: Richard Bollard
- Succeeded by: Stewart Reid
- In office 27 November 1935 – 25 September 1943
- Preceded by: Stewart Reid
- Succeeded by: Robert Coulter

Personal details
- Born: 7 February 1870 Oamaru, New Zealand
- Died: 21 December 1950 (aged 80) Hamilton, New Zealand
- Party: Labour
- Spouse: Harriet Wilhelmina Warnes
- Relations: Iris Martin (daughter)
- Children: 6
- Occupation: Painter, farmer

William Lee Martin (7 February 1870 – 21 December 1950), known as Lee Martin, was a New Zealand politician of the Labour Party.

== Biography ==
=== Early life ===
Martin was born in Oamaru in 1870. He received his education at Waimate District High School and at Christchurch Normal School. After school, he was an officer for The Salvation Army for six years. Afterwards, he was a painter and joined the Labour movement in Wanganui in 1902, was Secretary of the Wanganui Painters’ Union (1909–1912) and, for 4 years, a member of the Wanganui Technical School Board. He became a dairy farmer at Matangi in the Waikato and had two years as president of the Waikato Farmers’ Union. He was in the Salvation Army and Methodist Church and served for many years on school committees, Tamahere Road Board, Matangi Glaxo Factory Suppliers' Committee and as a member of the Central Waikato Electric Power Board from its formation in 1920.

He was a committee member of the Workers' Educational Association (WEA) and member of the League of Nations Union co-operation committee.

=== Political career ===
New Zealand Parliament
Years	Term	Electorate	Party
1927–1928	22nd	Raglan	Labour
1928–1931	23rd	Raglan	Labour
1935–1938	25th	Raglan	Labour
1938–1943	26th	Raglan	Labour

He was unsuccessful when he stood for Hamilton in 1925, but in a 1927 by-election won Raglan, which was a big upset for the Reform Party. He held Raglan until 1931. He then lost it to Stewart Reid of Reform, but won the electorate back in the 1935 general election.

He was Minister of Agriculture from 1935 to 1941 in the First Labour Government, first under Savage and then under Fraser. In September 1939 when Cabinet was passing nearly 30 war regulations as laid down in the War Book, Lee Martin denied knowledge of one of his regulations. Fraser became tetchy until Nash leaned over and silently pointed to the minister's signature on the paper. While still a member of the Cabinet he retired as a minister in 1941 owing to ill-health. He subsequently retired from Parliament at the 1943 general election.

He was appointed to the Legislative Council on 31 January 1946, and served there until his death on 21 December 1950, only days before the Legislative Council was abolished (on 31 December). He was buried at Hamilton East Cemetery.

== Family ==
In 1894 Lee Martin married Harriet Wilhelmina Warnes, of Greymouth, at the Salvation Army Citadel, Dunedin, she also being a Salvation Army officer. They lived in Wellington and Wanganui before farming at Matangi from about 1912. They had three sons and three daughters, one of whom was nurse Iris Martin.

== Notes ==
Political offices
Preceded by Charles Macmillan	Minister of Agriculture; 1935–1941	Succeeded by Jim Barclay
New Zealand Parliament
Preceded by Richard Bollard	Member of Parliament for Raglan; 1927–1931; 1935–1943	Succeeded by Stewart Reid
Preceded by Stewart Reid	Member of Parliament for Raglan; 1927–1931; 1935–1943	Succeeded by Robert Coulter
