= Russian New Zealanders =

Russian New Zealanders Русские новозеландцы
Total population
- 7,713 (2018 census)

Regions with significant populations
- Auckland Canterbury Wellington

Languages
- New Zealand English, Russian

Religion
- Eastern Orthodoxy

Related ethnic groups
- Russian Australians

Russian New Zealanders (Russian: Русские новозеландцы) are New Zealand citizens who either born in Russia, or of Russian ancestry, which may include Russian immigrants 1870s and their descendants born in New Zealand.

== Notable Russian New Zealanders ==
- Alex Gilbert, adoption advocate
- Andrei Mikhailovich, professional boxer
- Anouska Hempel, film and television actress, hotelier, interior designer
- Beverley Dunlop, children's author
- Nicole Fujita, model and tarento
- Valentina Ivanov, tennis player
- Stanislav Chalaev, weightlifter
- Yulia Beredenko, singer
- Artem Sitak, tennis player
- Mikhail Koudinov, artistic gymnast
- Victor Zotov, botanist
- Taika Waititi, filmmaker, actor and comedian

== See also ==
- European New Zealanders
- Immigration to New Zealand
- Russian diaspora
- New Zealand–Russia relations
- Pavlova
