= List of ambassadors of New Zealand to the Soviet Union =

The Ambassador from New Zealand to the Soviet Union was New Zealand's foremost diplomatic representative in the Union of Soviet Socialist Republics, and in charge of New Zealand's diplomatic mission in the USSR.

The embassy was located in Moscow, the Soviet Union's capital city. New Zealand first posted a resident ambassador to the Soviet Union in 1974, and a resident Head of Mission in 1944.

== History ==
- On 13 April 1944 – diplomatic relations were established at the mission level.
- On 13 June 1950 – Mission of New Zealand in Moscow was closed. Protecting the interests of New Zealand passed to the Embassy of the United Kingdom in the Soviet Union.
- On 19 April 1973 – renewed activities of the mission of New Zealand in Moscow, the mission was converted to an embassy.
- When the Soviet Union collapsed, at the end of 1991, the diplomatic mission and staff to the Soviet Union transformed into one to the Russian Federation.

== List of heads of mission ==
=== Ministers to the Soviet Union ===
- Charles Boswell (1944–1950)

=== Ambassadors to the Soviet Union ===
- Brian Lendrum (1974–1977)
- Jim Weir (1977–1980)

=== Chargés d'Affaires in the Soviet Union ===
- Gerald McGhie (1980–1981)
- Frank Wilson (1981–1984)

=== Ambassadors to the Soviet Union ===
- Alison Stokes (1984–1988)
- John G. McArthur (1988–1990)
- Gerald McGhie (1990–1991)

== See also ==
- List of Ambassadors from New Zealand to Russia, for a list of chief diplomatic representatives in Moscow after 1991.
