= John Lundon =

New Zealand politician (1828–1899)

New Zealand Parliament
Years	Term	Electorate	Party
1879–1881	7th	Mongonui and Bay of Islands	Independent

John Lundon (1828 – 7 February 1899) was a 19th-century Member of Parliament from Northland, New Zealand.

Born in County Limerick, Ireland, he arrived in Auckland in 1843. He represented Raglan and Onehunga on the Auckland Provincial Council. He was a hotel-keeper in Auckland, and an entrepreneur in Auckland and Samoa.

He unsuccessfully contested the 1870 by-election for Mongonui and the 1873 by-election for Mongonui and Bay of Islands.

He represented the Mongonui and Bay of Islands electorate from 1879 to 1881, when he was defeated by Richard Hobbs standing in the Bay of Islands electorate. He contested the Bay of Islands electorate in the 1890 election and was beaten by Robert Houston.

New Zealand Parliament
Preceded by John William Williams	Member of Parliament for Mongonui and Bay of Islands; 1879–1881	Constituency abolished
