= John McLeod (New Zealand politician) =

New Zealand politician

Member of the New Zealand Parliament for Mongonui and Bay of Islands
- In office February 1871 – 1873
- Majority: 68 (21.38%)

Personal details
- Born: 1825
- Died: 18 September 1883 (aged 58) Auckland, New Zealand

New Zealand Parliament
Years	Term	Electorate	Party
1871–1873	5th	Mongonui and Bay of Islands	Independent

John McLeod (1825 – 18 September 1883) was a provincial and national politician in New Zealand. He was a member of the New Zealand Parliament for half a term from 1871 to 1873.

McLeod was born in 1825 and came with his parents from Sydney to the Bay of Islands in Northland, New Zealand, in 1839.

He was a member of the Auckland Provincial Council for eight years, representing the Northern District from 1865 to 1869, then the Bay of Islands from 1870 to 1873. He was elected to Parliament for the Mongonui and Bay of Islands electorate in the 1871 general election. He resigned from Parliament in 1873, to go to Nova Scotia as a Wellington provincial immigration officer. His resignation led to the 1873 Mongonui and Bay of Islands by-election, which was won by John William Williams.

McLeod died in Auckland on 18 September 1883, aged 58.

New Zealand Parliament
New constituency	Member of Parliament for Mongonui and Bay of Islands; 1871–1873	Succeeded by John William Williams
