= Country Party (New Zealand) =

Defunct New Zealand political party

New Zealand Country Party
- Leader: Harold Rushworth
- Founded: 1922; 103 years ago
- Dissolved: 1938; 87 years ago
- Split from: Reform Party
- Succeeded by: Social Credit Party
- Ideology: Agrarianism; Social credit
- Political position: Centre
- Colours: Green

The Country Party of New Zealand was a political party which appealed to rural voters. It was represented in Parliament from 1928 to 1938. Its policies were a mixture of rural advocacy and social credit theory.

== History ==
The Country Party had its origins in the Auckland Farmers' Union, a branch of the New Zealand Farmers' Union which covered the old Auckland Province. Members of the branch increasingly came to believe that the Reform Party, which traditionally enjoyed much support in rural areas, was now putting the interests of farmers behind those of businesses in the city. The Auckland branch was also strongly influenced by the social credit theory of monetary reform, promoted by C. H. Douglas. Many farmers believed that the country's financial system did not treat them fairly and that they were being exploited by big-city bankers and moneylenders.

The Auckland branch grew increasingly frustrated with the Farmers' Union leadership, which did not support having an independent rural party. Eventually, members of the Auckland branch established the Country Party without the Union's backing. In 1928, the branch broke away from the Union altogether and gave its full backing to the Country Party.

In the 1925 elections, the Country Party fielded five candidates but won only 0.3% of the vote. In the 1928 elections it won the Bay of Islands seat. In Parliament, the Country Party tended to align itself with the growing Labour Party, primarily because both parties were distrustful of the financial and banking industries.

In the 1931 elections, the Country Party increased its share of the vote to 2.3%. In the 1935 elections, the party's share of the vote dropped slightly, but it won two seats. Arthur Sexton was elected in the Franklin electorate.

In the 1938 elections, the Country Party lost both its seats, as Labour decided to contest them. Rushworth had retired, partly because of Labour's intervention, and Sexton was defeated by the National Party. The party won only 0.23% of the vote and disappeared soon afterwards. Most rural voters who had supported it turned to the National Party, which incorporated the Reform Party. Later, however, the Social Credit Party would gain a certain amount of success in rural areas using much the same formula, and some see the Country Party as a forerunner to the more long-lived Social Credit.

== Country Party, 1969 ==
The Country Party was revived for the 1969 election by Clifford Stanley Emeny of New Plymouth (1920–2000), a World War II air force veteran. The party put forward candidates in 15 seats, and they attracted 6,715 votes. Emeny stood in Stratford where he got 1130 votes, the largest vote for the party; and in Egmont, New Plymouth, Tauranga and Waimarino. The other seats contested were Ashburton, Hamilton West, Otago, Pahiatua, Raglan, Rangitikei, Rodney, Waikato, Waitomo and Wallace.

The Country Party had changed its name to the Liberal Reform Party in 1970. In the 1972 election, Emeny stood as a Liberal Reform candidate.

== Electoral results ==
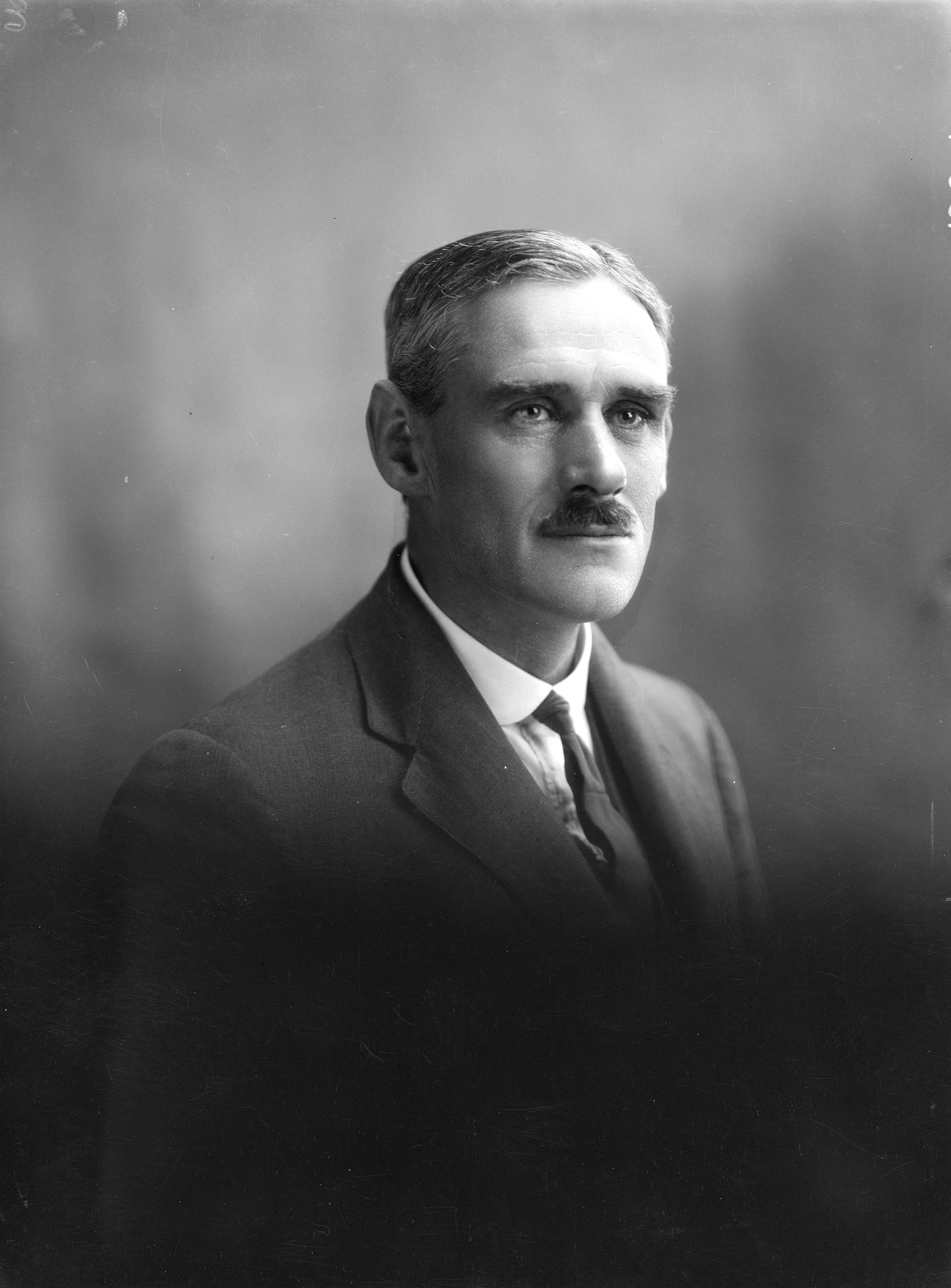
Harold Rushworth, party leader and MP, 1928-38.

Election	Candidates	# of seats won	Total votes	% of popular vote
1925	5	0 / 80	2,398	0.35%
1928	5	1 / 80	11,990	1.59%
1931	6	1 / 80	16,710	2.34%
1935	5	2 / 80	9,468	1.67%
1938	5	0 / 80	2,199	0.23%
1969	15	0 / 84	6,715	0.08%

=== Electorate results ===
==== 1925 general election ====
Electorate	Candidate	Votes	%
Bay of Islands	Hugh Sweeny	1,424	19.0%
Raglan	Robert Duxfield	222	3.1%
Rotorua	Frank Colbeck	204	2.8%
Thames	Alexander Ross	409	5.4%
Waikato	F. C. S. Lawson	139	2.0%

==== 1928 general election ====
Electorate	Candidate	Votes	%
Bay of Islands	Harold Rushworth	3,820	47.8%
Franklin	Harry Mellsop	3,821	49.2%
Rotorua	S. H. Judd	624	7.5%
Tauranga	Frank Colbeck	1,758	23.0%
Waikato	P. Keegan	1,897	24.4%

==== 1931 general election ====
Electorate	Candidate	Votes	%
Bay of Islands	Harold Rushworth	4,970	56.9%
Franklin	Harry Mellsop	2,511	32.4%
Kaipara	Albert Robinson	2,924	36.9%
Rotorua	D. R. F. Campbell	1,411	15.0%
Tauranga	Frank Colbeck	1,803	24.2%
Waikato	Solomon Ziman	3.091	43.2%

==== 1935 general election ====
Electorate	Candidate	Votes	%
Bay of Islands	Harold Rushworth	6,004	59.4%
Franklin	Arthur Sexton	4,803	51.4%
Tauranga	Alexander Ross	2,243	21.8%
Waikato	Solomon Ziman	1,221	12.6%
Waitomo	J. H. Penniket	2,431	23.7%

==== 1938 general election ====
Electorate	Candidate	Votes	%
Eden	Albert Robinson	155	1.0%
Franklin	Arthur Sexton	1,564	14.8%
Kaipara	James Scott-Davidson	257	2.7%
Raglan	Albert James Gallichan	115	1.2%
Tauranga	H. C. Barker	78	0.7%

==== By-elections ====
By-election	Candidate	Votes	%
Raglan, 1927	Cornelius Augustus Magner	532	8.8%
Bay of Islands, 1929	Harold Rushworth	4,385	52.9%
Hauraki, 1931	Alexander Ross	513	6.3%
