= John Gordon Eliott =

New Zealand politician

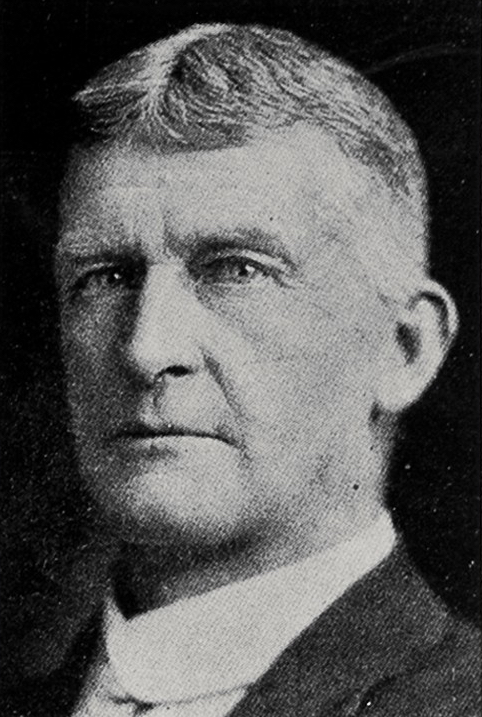
John Gordon Eliott

John Gordon Eliott (24 January 1872 – 16 May 1948) was a Reform Party Member of Parliament in New Zealand.

New Zealand Parliament
Years	Term	Electorate	Party
1925–1928	22nd	Oroua	Reform

He was elected to the Oroua electorate in the 1925 general election, but was defeated in 1928.

He had four children, one was also named John Gordon and served in World War I.
