= Hereworth School =

Independent school in New Zealand

Location
- Te Mata Road, Havelock North, Hawke's Bay; 39.6684°S 176.8906°E

Information
- Type: Independent Primary and Intermediate (Years 0 to 8)
- Motto: Non Nobis Solum (Not For Ourselves Alone)
- Established: 1927
- Ministry of Education Institution no.: 4108
- Headmaster: Matt Allen
- Enrolment: 332 (July 2026)
- Socio-economic decile: 10
- Website: hereworth.school.nz

Hereworth School is an independent school in Havelock North, New Zealand, which caters for boarding and day pupils. It was established in 1927 by the amalgamation of Heretaunga School (originally in Hastings) and Hurworth School (Wanganui). Until 2023 the school only admitted male pupils; the school now also admits female day pupils.

The school is founded on five main "cornerstones", which are Academic, Cultural, Christian Dimension, Boarding Life and Sport. The school has its own chapel and chapel choir in which the whole school attends services two times a week.

== Founding ==
Heretaunga School was founded in 1882 as a private boys' school in Hastings. In 1913, it moved to Havelock North.

Hereworth School was founded in 1927 by H. E. Sturge, with the merger of Heretaunga School and Hurworth School. Sturge was the headmaster until his death in 1935.

Hurworth School, previously known as Bathwick School (formally Wanganui Preparatory School), had been established in 1901 by William Edmund Atkinson (1860−1922), a member of a Unitarian family and a nephew of Sir Harry Atkinson. William Atkinson's wife Edith (née Watson) was a teacher and matron at the school.

== History ==
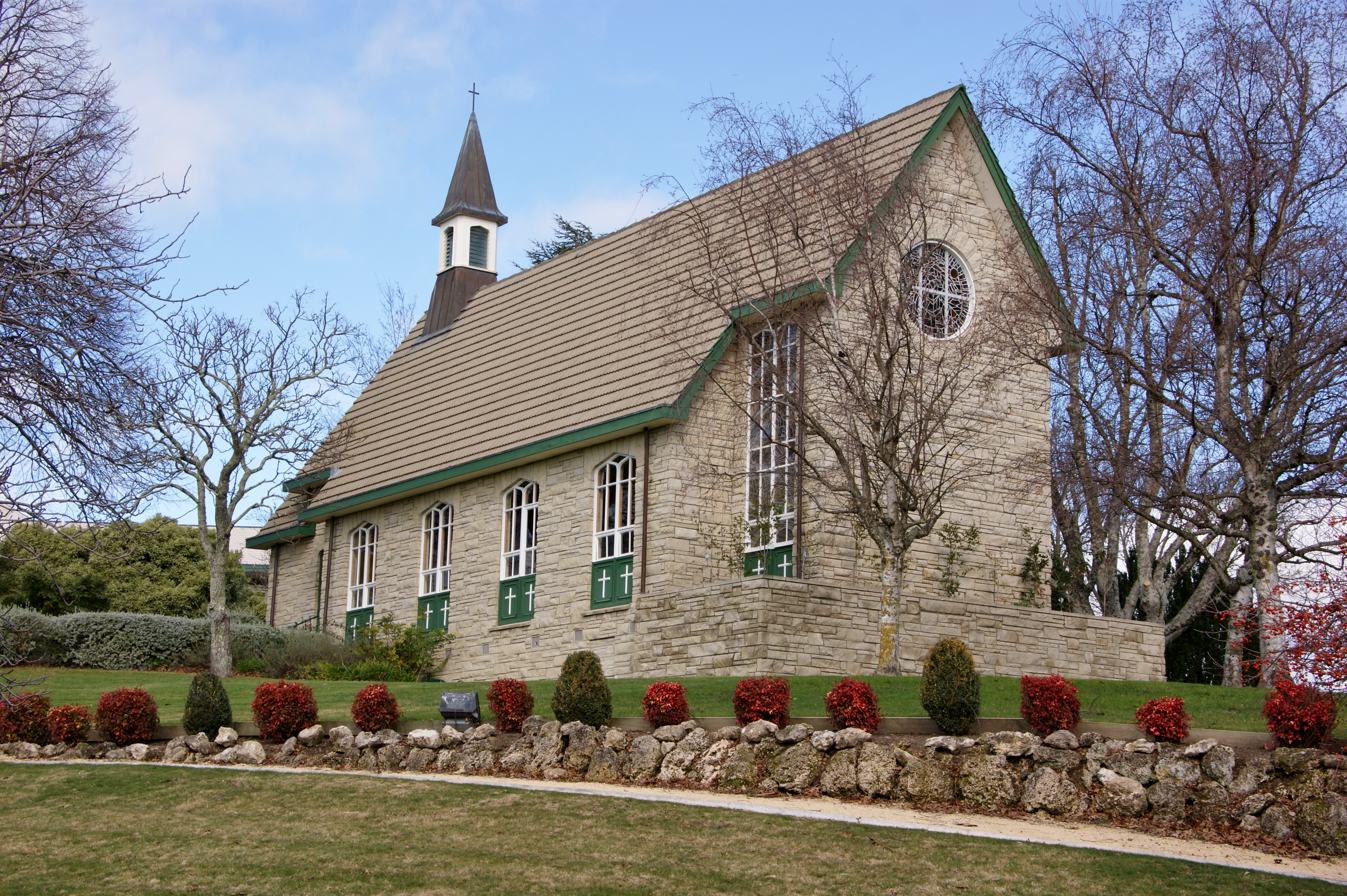
The chapel at Hereworth School

Hereworth was started in 1927 and has since then become a school that ranges from year 0 to year 8. The schools that it was born from, Hurworth and Heretaunga, were also private schools. Many new facilities have been added to Hereworth School and in 2008 the grounds won the 'Best Garden' award. As of 2007, students and staff have been able to use the modern technology block.

In January 2023, the school admitted its first female day pupils. The headmaster noted that the intention was to open a boarding house for girls in the future.

== Technology block ==
At the end of the first term in 2007, John Key opened the $2,900,000 Technology Block. In this building, there are six rooms. These are used for: Music and Drama, Hard Materials, Media Studies, Computing, Food Technology, and Soft Materials (Sewing etc.).

== Houses ==
The pupils of Hereworth each belong to one of four houses:

- Reeve House
- Elder House
- Grant House
- Rickard House

== Sport ==
One sport is compulsory in the winter and one in the summer. The winter sports on offer are:

- Hockey
- Rugby
- Soccer
- Netball

The summer sports on offer are:

- Tennis
- Softball
- Cricket
