= Agnes Williams =

New Zealand artist (1855-1940)

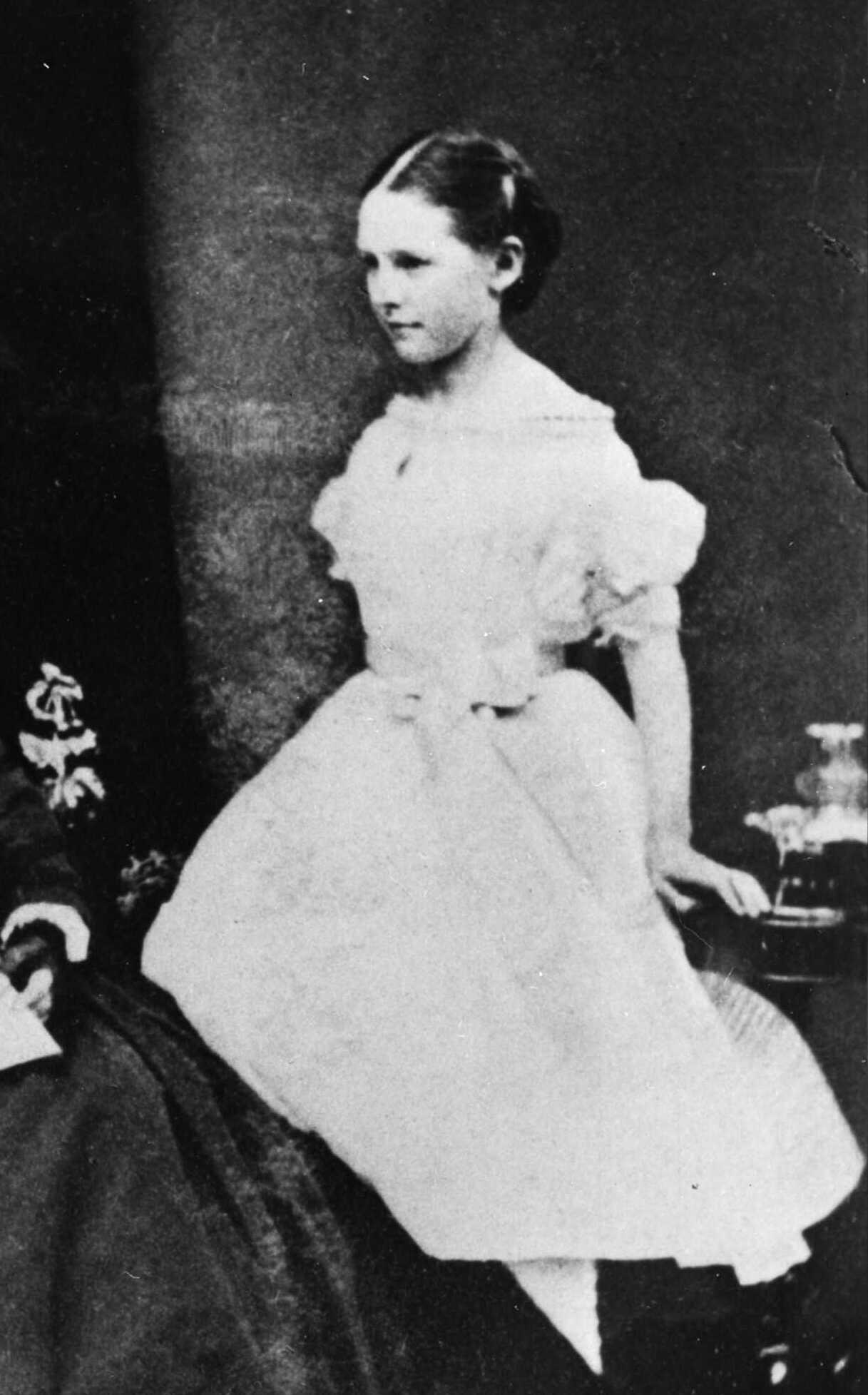
- Agnes Williams
- Born: 9 July 1855; Bay of Islands, New Zealand
- Died: December 1940 (aged 85)
- Resting place: Kaharau, near Ruatoria
- Spouse: Thomas Sydney Williams (m. 1882)
- Parents: John William Williams (father); Sarah Williams (née Busby) (mother)
- Relatives: Henry Williams (grandfather); James Busby (grandfather); Kenneth Williams (brother)

Agnes Lydia Williams (1855–1940) was a New Zealand artist and a member of the families of Henry Williams and James Busby.

== Biography ==
Agnes Lydia Williams was born in the Bay of Islands on 9 July 1855. She was the daughter of Sarah Williams (née Busby) and John William Williams, and granddaughter of Henry Williams and James Busby.

In 1882, Williams married Thomas Sydney Williams, her cousin, and son of Edward Marsh Williams. They lived in Kaharau, near Ruatoria. Together, they established the Kaharau Church. She is also recorded as being the medical advisor for the area.

In December 1940, she died as "probably the oldest surviving settler on the East Coast" and was buried alongside her husband in their Kaharau home's garden cemetery.

Several of her drawings, largely of landscapes in the Bay of Islands, are in the Auckland War Memorial Museum Tāmaki Paenga Hira, including Tapeka (Bay of Islands), Waitangi and Islands off Paihia & entrance to Kawakawa River, Waitangi. Her letters and other papers are also within the National Library's archive.
