= Richard Bollard =

New Zealand politician

The Honourable Richard Bollard
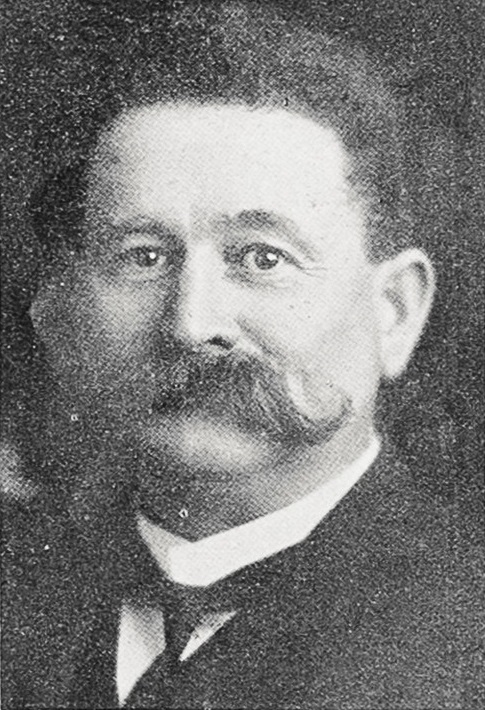

8th Minister of Internal Affairs
- In office 27 June 1923 – 25 August 1927
- Preceded by: William Downie Stewart Jr
- Succeeded by: Māui Pōmare

Member of the New Zealand Parliament for Raglan
- In office 14 December 1911 – 25 August 1925
- Preceded by: James Farmer (to 1870, when Raglan constituency was abolished)
- Succeeded by: Lee Martin

Personal details
- Born: 23 May 1863 Avondale, New Zealand
- Died: 25 September 1927 (aged 64) Wellington, New Zealand
- Party: Reform
- Spouse: Louisa Dakin (m.30 Dec 1881)
- Relations: Father: John Bollard MP
- Children: 6
- Occupation: Farmer

New Zealand Parliament
Years	Term	Electorate	Party
1911–1914	18th	Raglan	Reform
1914–1919	19th	Raglan	Reform
1919–1922	20th	Raglan	Reform
1922–1925	21st	Raglan	Reform
1925–1927	22nd	Raglan	Reform

Richard Francis Bollard (23 May 1863 – 25 August 1927) was a farmer and New Zealand politician of the Reform Party. He represented the Raglan electorate from 1911 to 1927, when he died. As Minister of Internal Affairs, he was a cabinet minister from 1923 to 1927 in the Reform Government.

He was reported making speeches and opening events and buildings; in 1912 farewelling the local publican, in 1914 opening Matangi post office, in 1915 opening the Winter Show of the Raglan A. and P. Association and opening Whatawhata post office. As Minister for Internal Affairs he opened Te Uku post office and Te Hutewai School in 1924, Raglan footbridge in 1926 and in 1924 was reported as making three calls one day and two the next, in between catching the train from Auckland to Wellington.

== Personal life ==
Bollard was the oldest of 14 children of John Bollard, also a Member of Parliament. He was educated at Whau School, which was later renamed Avondale Primary School. In his youth he worked on his father's farm. He married Louisa Dakin at St Jude's Church, Avondale, on 30 December 1881. They had 6 children, Mrs Wallace Hunter (Wellington), Mrs D. Bennett (Ratotonga), Miss Muriel Bollard (Wellington), Miss Madge Bollard (Wellington), Jack Bollard (Tauwhare), and Charles Bollard (Wellington). In 1884 he was chair of Avondale Cricket Club. His first employment was with Avondale Road Board, for which he became clerk in 1892, when it was chaired by his father. In 1899 he and his brother in law bought a sawmill at Taupiri, which they sold in 1908. He then farmed at Tauwhare, until moving to Wellington in 1923, when he was made a minister. In April 1926 he moved to the ministerial house at 123 Tinakori Rd, where he died on 25 August 1927, a few days after catching pneumonia. He was buried at Karori Cemetery.
