= Ian Hill (diplomat) =

New Zealand diplomat

His Excellency Ian Hill

New Zealand Ambassador to Russia
- In office April 2016 – January 2020

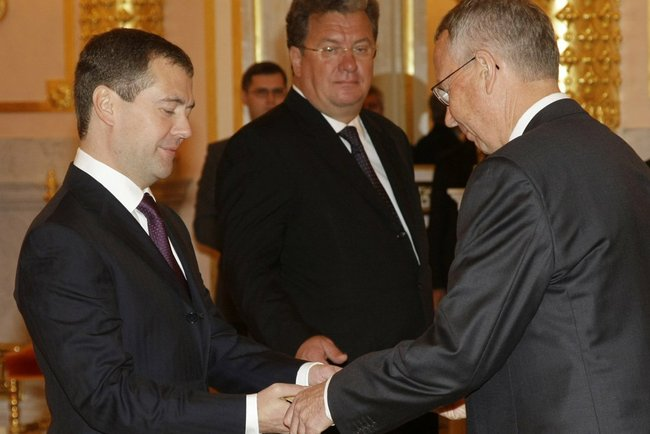
Hill presents his credentials to Dmitry Medvedev in October 2009.

Ian Alexander Hill was a New Zealand diplomat with the New Zealand Ministry of Foreign Affairs and Trade (MFAT). He was the New Zealand Ambassador to Russia, having previously served in that position from 2009 to 2012.

Hill is also accredited to Armenia, Belarus, Kazakhstan, Kyrgyzstan, Moldova, Tajikistan, Turkmenistan and Uzbekistan. Previous to his current appointment, Mr. Hill was the Divisional Manager- Europe in the New Zealand MFAT from 2012 to 2016. Hill also served as Deputy Chief of Mission at the New Zealand Embassy in Washington D.C. (2004-2009), and in earlier assignments as New Zealand's High Commissioner to the Kingdom of Tonga, and in New Zealand diplomatic missions in London and Fiji. Mr Hill was also the Prime Minister's Foreign Affairs Adviser in Wellington from 1993 to 1995.

Hill completed his master's degree in history at the University of Canterbury in 1979. His thesis was titled "The Twilight of the Augustan Repose: Workings of Hanoverian politics, 1754-1757."
