= John Edie (New Zealand politician) =

New Zealand politician

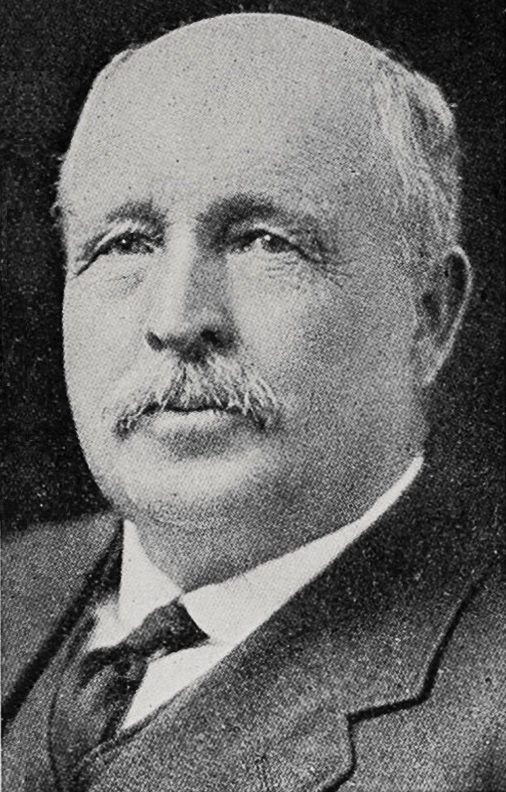

Member of the New Zealand Parliament for Bruce
- In office 14 April 1920 – 7 December 1922
- Preceded by: James Allen
- Succeeded by: Constituency abolished

Member of the New Zealand Parliament for Clutha
- In office 7 December 1922 – 4 November 1925
- Preceded by: Alexander Malcolm
- Succeeded by: Fred Waite

Personal details
- Born: 1856 Newcastle, New South Wales
- Died: 7 June 1928 (aged 71–72) Lawrence, New Zealand
- Party: Liberal
- Occupation: Engineer

John Edie (1856 – 7 June 1928) was a Liberal Party Member of Parliament in the Otago region of New Zealand. He was a surveyor and an engineer, and also spent time as a farmer. He was Mayor of Lawrence.

== Early life ==
Edie was born in Newcastle, New South Wales in 1856. He came to New Zealand as a child and attended school in Waitahuna near Lawrence. He joined the survey department in 1873 and surveyed the Catlins River Branch railway line, but construction did not start until 1879. In 1876, at age 20, he became assistant surveyor to the Government.

He joined the Tuapeka County Council in 1885 as an engineer and remained in that position until 1919, when he resigned to stand in the 1919 election.

== Political career ==
New Zealand Parliament
Years	Term	Electorate	Party
1920–1922	20th	Bruce	Liberal
1922–1925	21st	Clutha	Liberal

In the 1896 election, Edie contested the Clutha electorate. Before the election, he was criticised for standing for the Liberal Party, thus claiming to represent the working man, yet underpaying staff at his mine. He was soundly beaten by the conservative incumbent, James Thomson.

Edie contested the Bruce electorate in the 1919 election as a Liberal against the incumbent, Reform's James Allen. Edie was beaten by the small margin of 126 votes (2.15%). After Allen's resignation in March 1920, Edie won the Bruce electorate in a 1920 by-election. At the time of the election, he was Mayor of Lawrence.

In the 1922 general election he won the Clutha electorate, but lost Clutha in 1925 to the Reform candidate Fred Waite.

== Later life and death ==
Edie was for a time captain of the Tuapeka Rifles. He was into mining, especially gold mining, and had an interest in a mine at Island Block (a locality on State Highway 8 between Beaumont and Ettrick). He shared an interest in a farm of 900 acres (360 ha) in Tuapeka West with two sons.

Edie died on 7 June 1928 at Lawrence after having been bed-ridden with heart problems for six months.

His son, Herbert Kerr Edie, unsuccessfully contested the 1935 and 1938 elections in the Clutha electorate as a Labour Party candidate against James Roy.

== Notes ==
New Zealand Parliament
Preceded by James Allen	Member of Parliament for Bruce; 1920–1922	Constituency abolished
Preceded by Alexander Malcolm	Member of Parliament for Clutha; 1922–1925	Succeeded by Fred Waite
