= 1892 Bruce by-election =

New Zealand by-election

- 4 May 1892
- Turnout: 1,623 (75.06%)
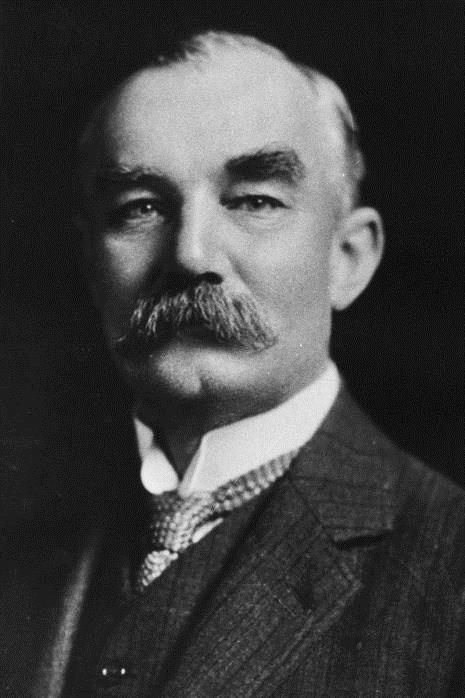

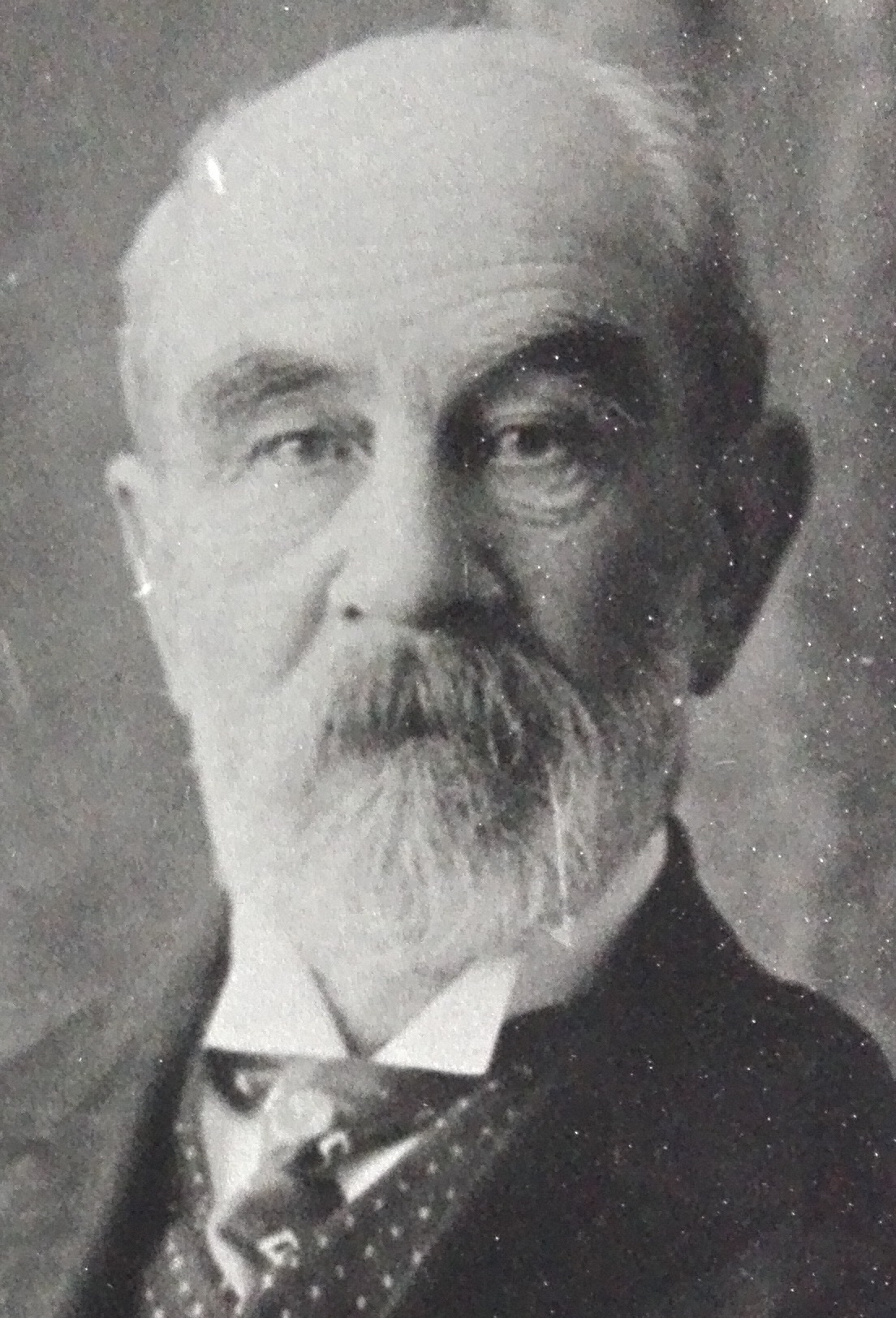
Candidate	James Allen	Alfred Lee Smith
Party	Conservative	Liberal
Popular vote	1,085	538
Percentage	66.85	33.14
MP before election
James William Thomson
Conservative
Elected MP
James Allen
Conservative

The Bruce by-election, 1892 was a by-election held on 4 May 1892 during the 11th New Zealand Parliament in the rural lower South Island electorate of Bruce.

== Background ==
The by-election was triggered after the resignation of sitting Member James William Thomson. The election was a two-way contest and was won by James Allen, previously the Member for Dunedin East.

== Results ==
The following table gives the election results:

1892 Bruce by-election
Party	Candidate	Votes	%	±%
Conservative	James Allen	1,085	66.85	
Liberal	Alfred Lee Smith	538	33.14	
Majority		547	33.70	
Turnout		1,623	75.06	
Registered electors		2,162		

Allen held the electorate until his own resignation in 1920 to become New Zealand's High Commissioner to the United Kingdom, which triggered another by-election.
