= Official History of New Zealand's Effort in the Great War =

New Zealand four-volume history series

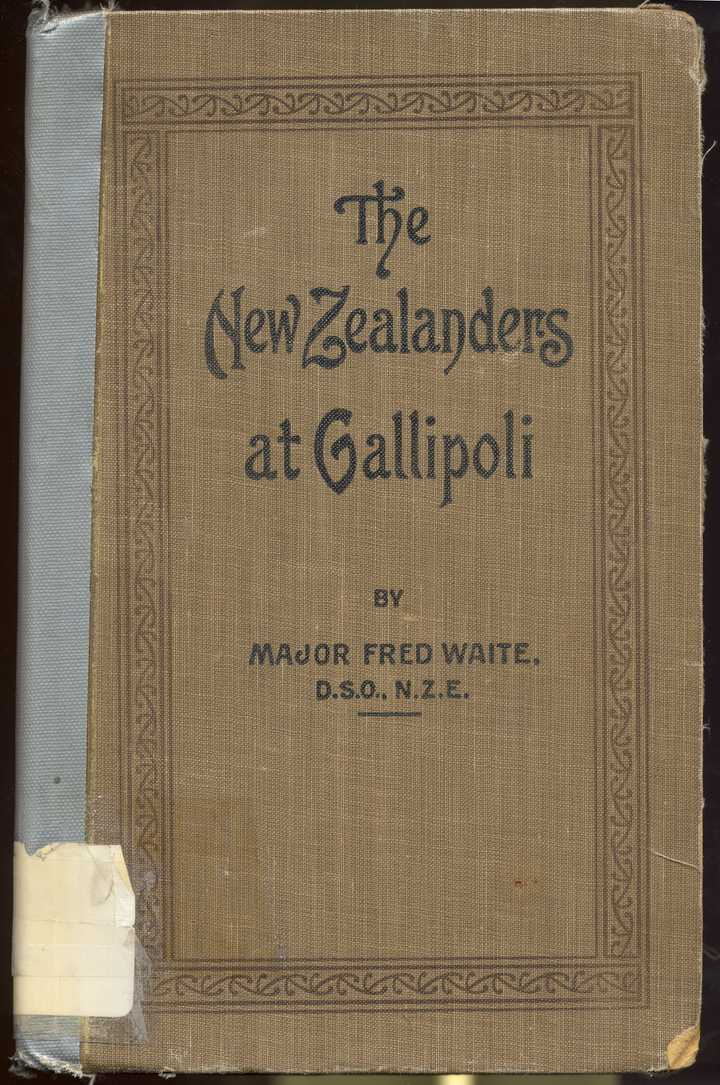
- Cover of volume I covering Gallipoli
- Editor: Fred Waite
- Author: divers hands
- Language: English
- Subject: Military history of New Zealand in the First World War
- Genre: Military history
- Publisher: Whitcombe and Tombs
- Publication date: 1919–23
- Publication place: New Zealand
- Followed by: Official History of New Zealand in the Second World War 1939–45

The Official History of New Zealand's Effort in the Great War is a four-volume 'Popular History' series which covered the New Zealand involvement in the First World War. Aimed at presenting the efforts of the New Zealand Military Forces during the war to the general public, the series was published during the period 1919 to 1923 under the stewardship of Fred Waite. Although the primary source of information on the New Zealand military contribution to the First World War for many years, it was recognised as an insufficient tribute to New Zealand soldiers who served during the conflict.

== Background ==
As early as 1915, it was recognised by the New Zealand Government that an official history would be produced to document the contributions of the New Zealand Expeditionary Force (NZEF) to the First World War. The official war correspondent, Malcolm Ross, was tasked with collecting the historical material that would be required. Ross, a trained journalist who had reported on the seizure of Samoa earlier in the war, had been on Gallipoli alongside Charles Bean, the Australian official war correspondent, and would also observe the New Zealand Division during the fighting on the Western Front.

After the war, when serious consideration was being given to the production of the official history, Lieutenant General Alexander Godley, the commander of the NZEF, believed that Ross would be the best person to produce the history. Ross also had political support in the form of his friend William Massey, the prime minister of New Zealand. However, Major General Alfred Robin, the commandant of the New Zealand Military Forces, held firm views of what should be communicated by an official history. He dictated an educational approach, considering the target audience to be students of military history. Journalistic and writing skills were second to the ability to understand and communicate military tactics and strategy, the lessons of which were to be imparted at the direction of the Imperial General Staff at the War Office. Hence, rather than Ross, Lieutenant Colonel Hugh Stewart, an academic of the Canterbury University College who had commanded an infantry battalion in the New Zealand Division during the war, was favoured by Robin to write the official history.

It was recognised that an accessible 'Popular History', aimed at a more general readership would be appropriate alongside the official history. Endorsed by the Minister of Defence James Allen, the Government approved the writing of this 'Popular History'. The Government's decision to produce a 'Popular History' was formally announced in June 1918.

== Preparation ==
Even though a 'Popular History' may have been seen as more suitable for Ross than the official history, he continued to be overlooked. Instead, Major Fred Waite was selected by Allen to oversee the production of the 'Popular History' series. In response to a request by the New Zealand Military Forces' Base Records in Wellington for historical records, Waite, who had served in the war with the NZEF, had produced a summary of the New Zealand involvement in the Gallipoli Campaign. It was this which brought him to Allen's attention.

Originally envisaged as one volume, ultimately four books were written for the 'Popular History', one each for the campaigns in Gallipoli, the Western Front and the Middle East, with a fourth volume on the smaller campaigns, contributions of the New Zealand Naval Forces and organisational aspects of the NZEF.

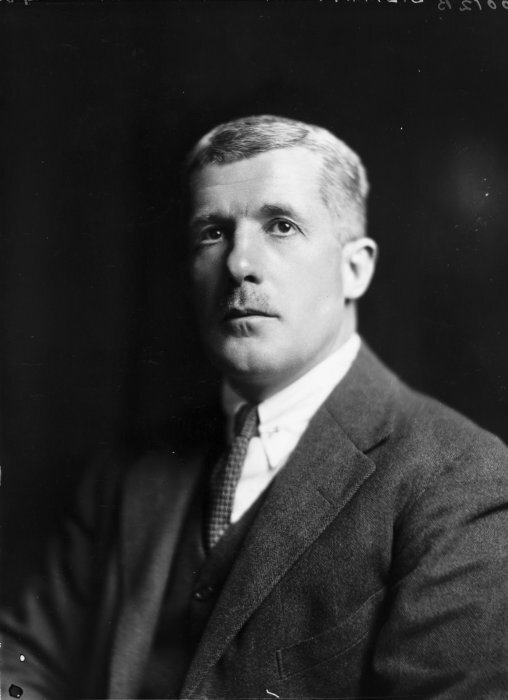
Hugh Stewart, the author of the second volume of the 'Popular History' series

As well as co-ordinating the publication of the four volumes of the 'Popular History', Waite wrote the first volume, an account of the NZEF campaign in Gallipoli, Waite having served there with the New Zealand Engineers. He commenced writing in late 1918 and his book was published in 1919. It included a preface by Allen which introduced the 'Popular History' series as an alternative to the official history and retailed for six shillings.

Stewart, who had originally been considered to write the official history, was selected to write the history of the New Zealand Division, which served on the Western Front. Although reluctant to accept his commission, he began work in January 1919 and by that August had completed his first draft. His work, designated as the second volume of the 'Popular History', was published in 1922. At the time of its release, it was favourably reviewed in the Christchurch newspaper, The Press, particularly in respect to Waite's work.

A draft manuscript detailing the NZEF operations in the Middle East had been prepared by Major A. H. Wilkie, who had served with the Wellington Mounted Rifles in the Sinai and Palestine Campaigns but the draft was deemed unacceptable and Lieutenant Colonel C. Guy Powles revised it into a more accessible form. This was published in 1922, also to favourable reviews.

Lieutenant H.T.B. Drew was the editor of the fourth volume, which covered the smaller campaigns in which New Zealand personnel were involved. There were chapters on the seizure of Samoa, the work of the New Zealand Naval Forces' HMS Philomel and the brief Senussi Campaign. There were also chapters on the New Zealand Dental Corps, Veterinary Corps, the work of New Zealand medical services, bases, finance and soldier education. His work completed in seven months, Drew also proposed a volume of New Zealand's general war effort but this suggestion was not taken up by the Government.

== Volumes ==
- The New Zealanders at Gallipoli – Major Fred Waite (1919)
- The New Zealand Division 1916–1919: A Popular History Based on Official Records – Col. H. Stewart (1921)
- The New Zealanders in Sinai and Palestine – Lieut.-Colonel. C. Guy Powles (1922)
- War Effort of New Zealand: A Popular History of (a) Minor Campaigns in which New Zealanders took part; (b) Services not fully dealt with in the Campaign Volumes; (c) The Work at the Bases – Lieut. H. T. B. Drew (Editor) (1923)

The volumes were published by Whitcombe and Tombs. Despite being a 'Popular History', each volume was subtitled as the "Official History of New Zealand's Effort in the Great War".

== Reception ==
As the intended official history was not written, the 'Popular History' series remained the main source of information on the New Zealand contribution to the First World War for several years. Stewart's work, despite text which is described as "inaccessible and turgid" by recent historians, was for 75 years the main reference for the exploits of the New Zealand Division in the First World War as was Powles' work on the fighting in Sinai and Palestine. As early as the 1940s, when thoughts were turning to the official history of New Zealand's military in the Second World War, it was recognised that the 'Popular History' was an inadequate account of and tribute to the men who had served in the First World War.

An error in the first volume of the series led to a long-running under-estimate of the number of New Zealanders who fought in the Gallipoli Campaign. In his introduction to The New Zealanders at Gallipoli, Sir Ian Hamilton stated that 8,556 New Zealanders had served at Gallipoli. While this figure did not appear in the body of the book, which did not provide an alternative, it was frequently repeated by historians until the 1980s. A 2005 book by Richard Stowers included an estimate that the actual figure was 13,977. In 2013, David Green determined that Hamilton had calculated his figure from a mistaken interpretation of tables in The New Zealanders at Gallipoli. Research by New Zealand Government agencies published in 2016, found that the number of New Zealanders landed at Gallipoli was approximately 16,000.
