= Alfred Lee Smith =

The Honourable Alfred Lee Smith
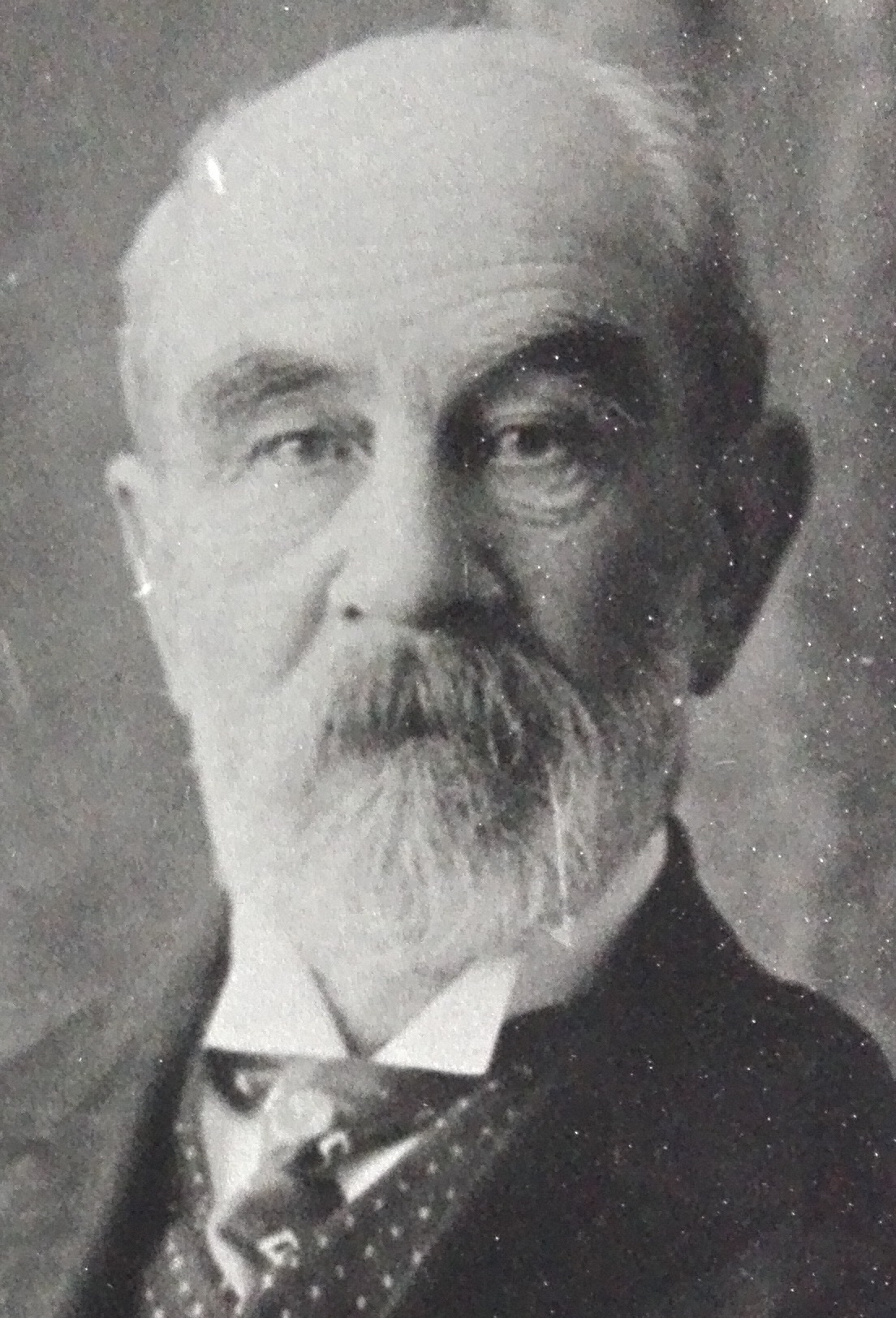

Member of the New Zealand Legislative Council
- In office 18 June 1898 – 18 June 1905

Personal details
- Born: 1838 Yorkshire, England
- Died: 2 May 1917 (aged 78–79) Andersons Bay, New Zealand
- Party: Liberal
- Spouse: Elizabeth Sharpe
- Occupation: Businessman

Alfred Lee Smith (1838 – 2 May 1917) was a Yorkshire-born businessman from Dunedin, New Zealand. He was a member of the member of the New Zealand Legislative Council for one term from 1898 to 1905.

== Early life ==
Lee Smith was born in Yorkshire in 1838. He received a private education, and was afterwards engaged at the London Stock Exchange. He came to New Zealand in 1868 and landed in Wellington.

== Professional career ==
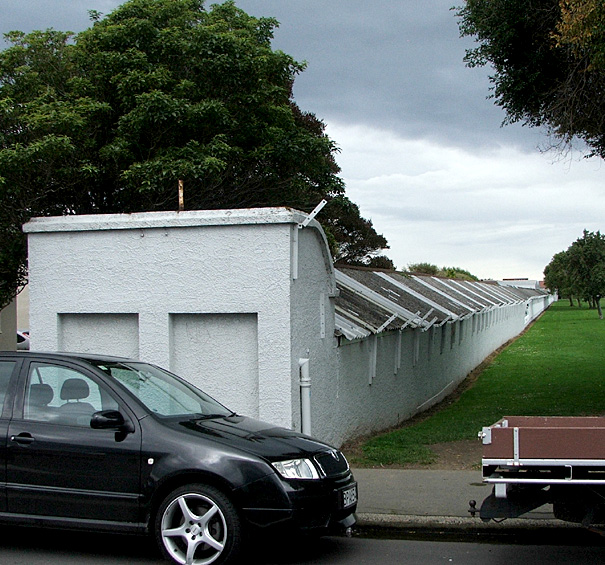
Donaghy's Rope Walk, a Category I heritage building in South Dunedin once owned by Lee Smith and Royse

In Christchurch, Lee Smith had a brickworks. When he moved to Dunedin, he had a brickworks in Kensington. He then bought an interest in the firm Royse, Stead and Smith, grain and flour merchants.

In 1881, he and William Royse bought Donaghy's Rope And Twine Company of its founder, John Donaghy, and Lee Smith became the company's chairman. The company still exists today as Donaghys. Donaghy's Rope Walk in South Dunedin is the only rope walk left in New Zealand, and is registered as a Category I heritage building due to its unique architectural form: the building is only 4 metres (13 ft) wide, but 289 metres (948 ft) long.

Lee Smith then gained an interest in the Green Island Roller Mills and became the company's chairman. He was chairman of the Mutual Grain Agency, and from 1903 to 1915, he was a director and board member of the Union Steam Ship Company. He was one of the directors of the New Zealand and South Seas Exhibition that was held in Dunedin in 1889–90.

== Political career ==
Lee Smith entered public life when he stood for the newly-formed Dunedin Ratepayers' Association in the Leith Ward for Dunedin City Council in September 1886. It was his first election ever and he had an unexpectedly large majority. He retired by rotation after three years and did not stand for re-election.

He stood in the 1890 election in the three-member City of Dunedin electorate and of the six candidates, he came last. When James William Thomson resigned from the Bruce electorate in 1892, he stood in the resulting by-election but was beaten by James Allen. Lee Smith was a man of principal and the Otago Daily Times commented in his obituary that he would have struggled in the House of Representatives to adhere to the party line, and that he was much better suited to the Legislative Council, where no adherence to party politics was required, but each issue could be discussed by him on its merits.

In June and July 1894, Lee Smith was the sole New Zealand delegate at the Colonial Conference in Ottawa, Ontario, Canada.

Lee Smith was appointed by the Liberal Government as a member of the Legislative Council from 18 June 1898 to 18 June 1905 when his term ended. It is believed that Lee Smith fell out with Joseph Ward over a private issue and that he did not get reappointed in 1905 for that reason. At the time, though, there was a discussion whether the Legislative Council should be elected at large, and apparently the government informed the two members whose term expired on 18 June 1905 (Jeremiah Twomey was the other member) that they would not be reappointed until the controversy had been resolved.

== Family ==
Lee Smith was married to Elizabeth Sharpe from Hull in Yorkshire. They lived in the Dunedin suburb of Green Island when he was appointed to the Legislative Council, but they later moved to Andersons Bay. He died on 2 May 1917 at his home in Andersons Bay and was buried at Green Island Cemetery next to his second son, Frank Lee Smith, who had died in August 1898. He was survived by his wife, who died in 1934, and his first son.
