= 1920 Bruce by-election =

New Zealand by-election

- 14 April 1920
- Turnout: 4,734 (63.92%)
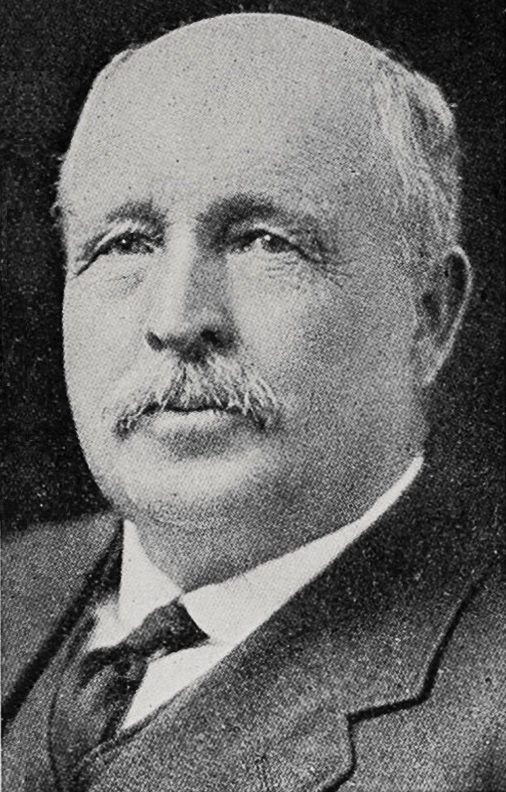

Candidate	John Edie	James Begg
Party	Liberal	Reform
Popular vote	2,421	2,297
Percentage	51.14	48.52
MP before election
James Allen
Reform
Elected MP
John Edie
Liberal

The Bruce by-election of 1920 was a by-election held on 14 April 1920 during the 20th New Zealand Parliament in the rural lower South Island electorate of the Bruce.

== Background ==
The contest was triggered due to the resignation from Parliament of James Allen, who took up the position of New Zealand's High Commissioner to the United Kingdom. The Liberal Party's chosen candidate was John Edie. He had contested the Bruce electorate in the 1919 election against James Allen and was beaten by the mere margin of 126 votes (only 2.15%).

== Results ==
The following table gives the election results:

1920 Bruce by-election
Party	Candidate	Votes	%	±%
Liberal	John Edie	2,421	51.14	+2.22
Reform	James Begg	2,297	48.52	
Informal votes		16	0.33	−0.87
Majority		124	2.61	
Turnout		4,734	63.92	−16.28
Registered electors		7,406		

== Aftermath ==
The Bruce electorate was abolished for the 1922 general election. Edie won the Clutha electorate, holding it until 1925.
