= George Stead =

Grain merchant, racehorse owner and breeder, businessman

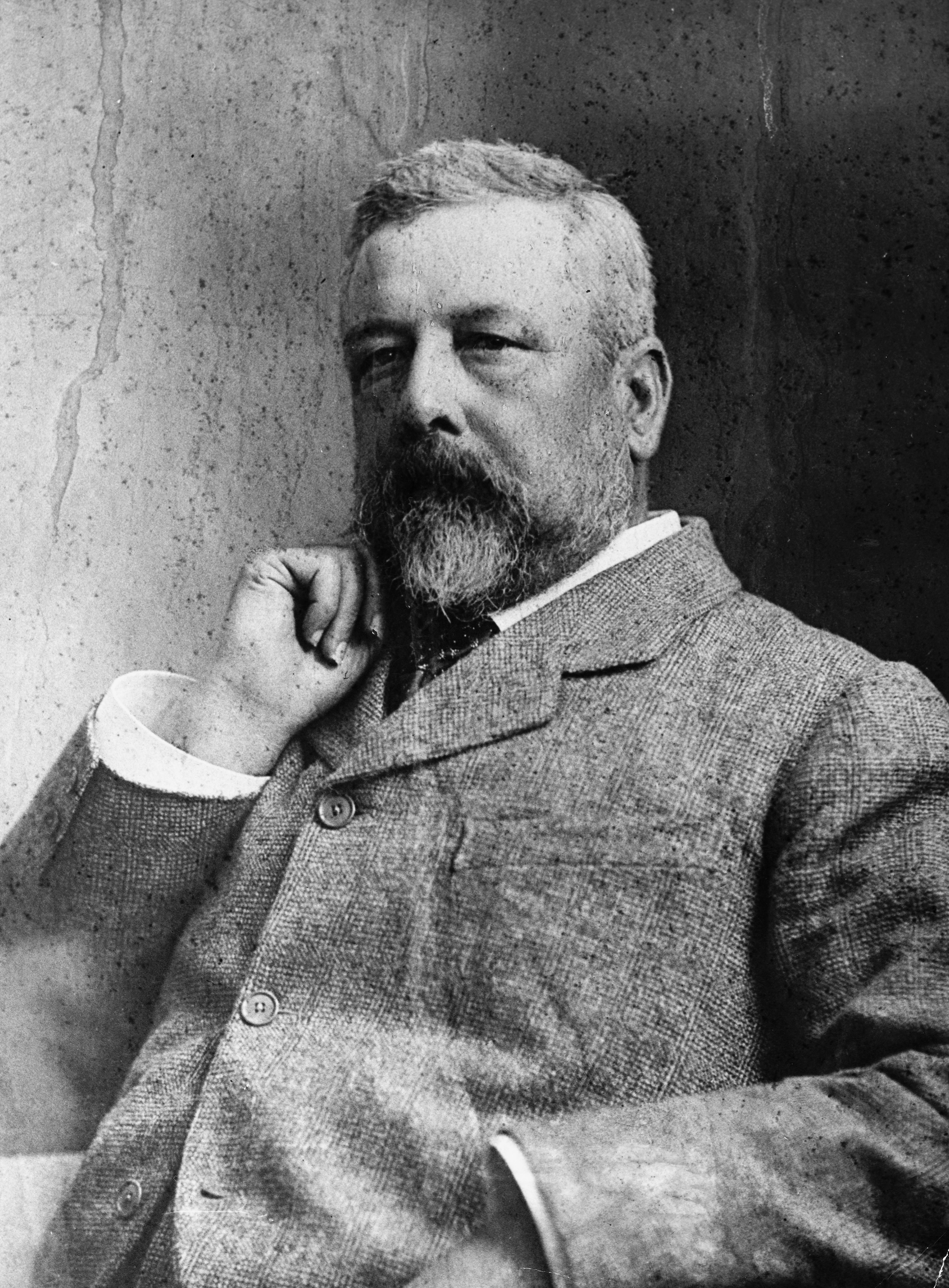
George Stead in ca 1901

George Gatonby Stead (17 August 1841 – 29 April 1908) was a notable New Zealand grain merchant, racehorse owner and breeder, and businessman.

== Early life ==
Stead was born in 1841 in London, England to George Stead and Mary Gatonby. In 1849 the family emigrated to South Africa, where he completed his studies at St. Andrew's College, Grahamstown. He returned to London in 1865, and the following year left for New Zealand, on the Talbot.

== Business career ==
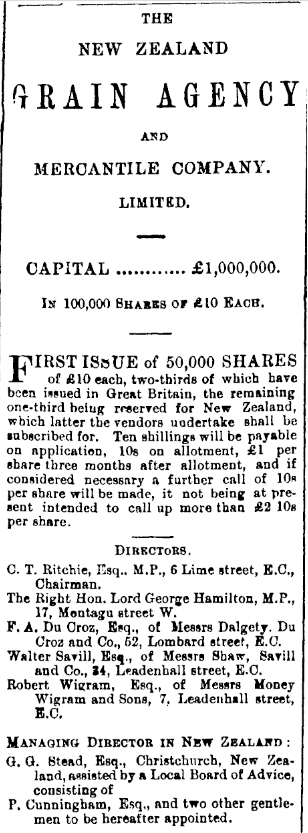
NZ Grain Agency & Mercantile Co. – Southland Times 1 Feb 1882

Upon his arrival in Christchurch Stead was employed by the Union Bank of Australia, at the first permanent bank branch in Christchurch, managed by Joseph Palmer. By 1871 Stead had left the bank and partnered with William Royse, to form Royse, Stead & Co. In the early 1870s New Zealand was entering a boom period, largely brought about by public borrowing for investment in immigration, land development, and transport links, such as railways and roads. Private individuals and companies were also raising funds offshore.

Royse, Stead & Co. were well placed to benefit from the boom. Royse was an experienced grain merchant and shipping agent, with Australian connections through his uncle Joseph Darwent. Stead, from his time with the bank, had five years' worth of contacts in Canterbury business and farming circles. Royse and Stead were able to capitalise on the rapid development of wheat cropping on the Canterbury Plains in the 1870s, and built up extensive interests as grain traders, shipping agents, brick makers, maltsters, and property developers, among other activities. Alfred Lee Smith from Dunedin also had a stake in Royse, Stead and Co for some time.

The boom ended in 1878 when the City Bank of Glasgow collapsed, which led to credit drying up on the London market. This reduced the funding available to New Zealand, and with many activities dependent on borrowing, and many landowners heavily indebted, the credit shortage hit hard, compounded by falling wool prices. Despite the wider downturn, the grain market held up, and in 1881 preparations were made for Royse, Stead & Co. to merge into a new entity and undertake a major capital raising, supposedly to allow Royse to retire. Royse sold out of Royse, Stead & Co., which then merged with the grain trading interests of Peter Cunningham, and in 1882 the resulting new company floated on the stock exchanges of Great Britain and New Zealand, as The New Zealand Grain Agency and Mercantile Company, with a capital of £1,000,000. Stead and Cunningham were the founding directors in New Zealand, and Mr. F. A. Du Croz, who had known Royse's uncle, the late Joseph Darwent, was one of the British directors.

The New Zealand Grain Agency and Mercantile Company survived for less than three years. It was bankrupt by 1884, due to poor grain harvests in 1882 and 1883, and the New Zealand financial downturn that had deepened, and turned into a long depression, lasting to the mid-1890s. Although the company was bust, Stead and Cunningham personally weathered the financial storm, and eventually repaid the New Zealand shareholders in full. Stead went on to catch the boom of the 1890s, and came out financially stronger than ever. During that closing decade of the nineteenth century, through to his death in 1908, he was the leading figure in Canterbury business circles.

Stead was a director of the Christchurch Gas, Coal, and Coke Company, Ltd., S. Manning and Co., Ltd., and the New Zealand Shipping Company. He was a proprietor of the Theatre Royal in Christchurch and was involved in the establishment of the Tai Tapu and Central Dairy Factories. He was deputy-chairman of the Fire and Marine Insurance Company, and after it was taken over by the Alliance Assurance Company of London, he became its deputy-chairman in New Zealand. In 1890 he purchased The Press, at that time in serious difficulties, and from 1891 he was chairman of its committee of directors. He is credited with turning around the newspaper and invigorating its management and journalism.

In 1897 Stead took a new partner into George G. Stead and Co; being Joseph George Fisher Palmer, who was the son of his original manager, Joseph Palmer of Union Bank of Australia.

== Horse racing and breeding ==
His main interest was race horses, and he was honorary secretary of the Canterbury Jockey Club from 1873 for over 30 years. Stead was the most successful racehorse owner of his time, with 181 wins, and he made an important contribution to New Zealand bloodlines by importing sires and brood mares from Australia and England. In 1877, he promoted the idea of having the Riccarton Racecourse Siding built to make the horse racing ground more accessible, and to increase turnover. The line opened in November 1877.

== Public life ==
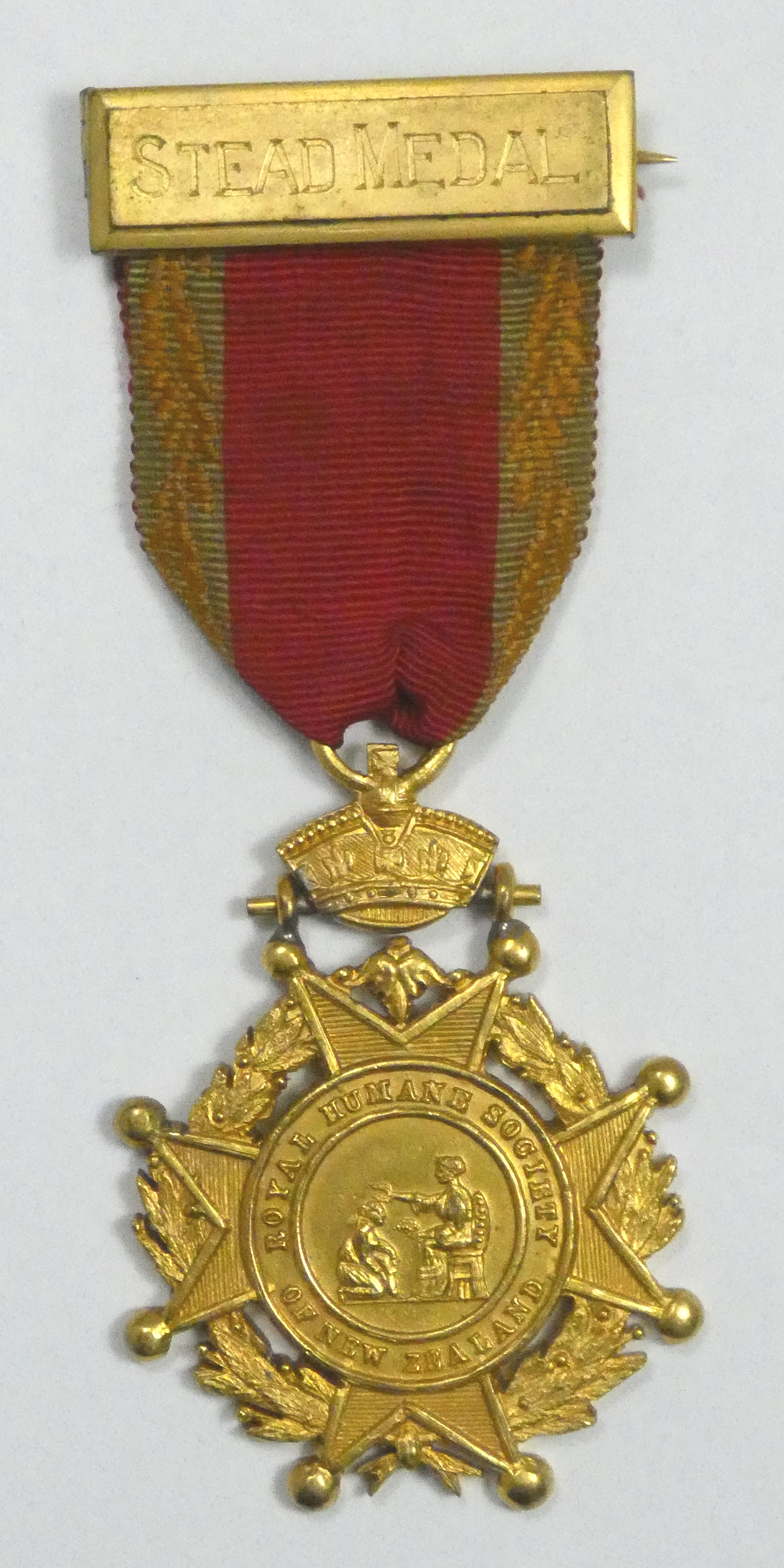
The Royal Humane Society of New Zealand's Stead Medal

Stead was very active in public life. He was the patron of The Canterbury Athletic and Cycling Club from its foundation in 1899, a member of the board of governors of Canterbury College, a committee member of Lincoln School of Agriculture, and vice-president of The Royal Humane Society of New Zealand. In 1898 he established a fund to sponsor the Society’s Stead Medal, in gold, "awarded only for very conspicuous acts of bravery", that was only awarded three times, in 1906, 1909 and 1913.

He launched and promoted the patriotic movement that raised the funds to provide and equip a troop of 110 mounted men, "The NZ Roughriders", for the South Africa war. They were members of the Third Contingent, the first privately funded troops of the war, who sailed from Lyttelton aboard the s.s. Knight Templar, in February, 1900.

He stood for Parliament in the Avon electorate in the 1890 election, however the working-class electorate rejected him because he had organised and supported the strikebreakers at Lyttelton Port during the national maritime strike earlier that year. Stead was defeated by the incumbent, Edwin Blake, and never stood for Parliament again.

In 1908 he was Chairman of the Blackball Coal Mining Company, owner of a large mine at Blackball on the West Coast. A three-month strike occurred over the rights to an eight-hour working day, and a 30-minute lunchbreak. Stead opposed the strike, which ended with victory to the miners, said to be due, in part, to Stead's death. However, a more probable explanation was the flooding and closure of the nearby Tyneside mine, which forced the company to concede to the strikers, so it could reopen the Blackball mine, and restore the supply of coal.

== Family life ==
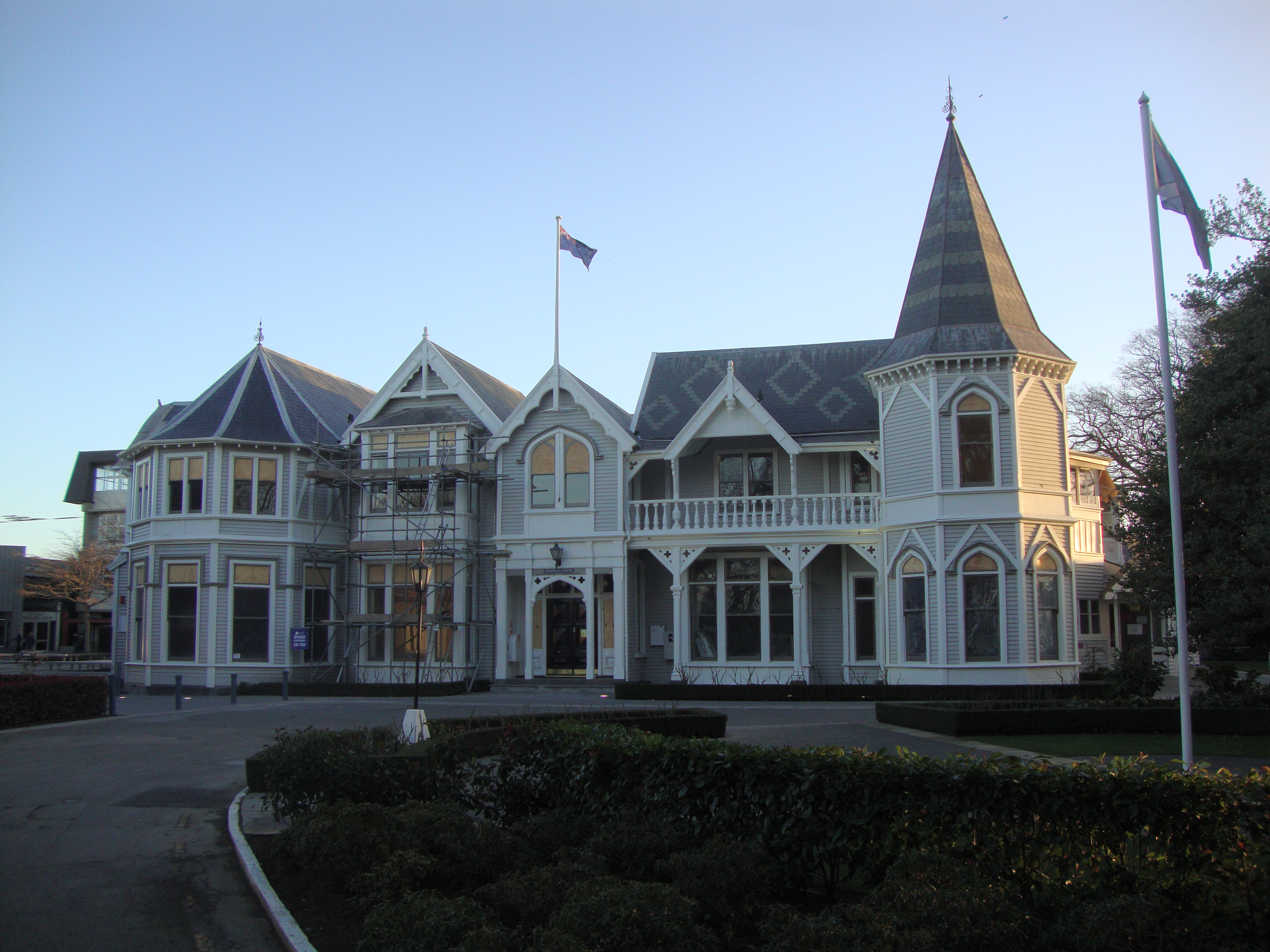
Strowan House in 2011

In 1876 Stead married Lucie Maria Wilkinson. They had three sons and a daughter. One of their sons was the ornithologist Edgar Stead.

The Stead family home from 1890 was Strowan, set in park-like grounds on Papanui Road. The property was sold by Stead's executors in 1918, to become St Andrew's College for boys.

Stead collapsed at the Riccarton Racecourse when he had an attack of Bright's disease. He died two days later, on 29 April 1908, at Strowan House. His wife lived at their house until 1918 and she died in 1920. Both were buried at Linwood Cemetery.
