= Peter McSkimming =

New Zealand politician

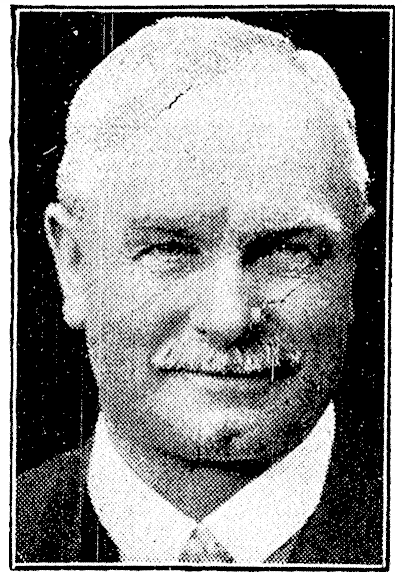
Peter McSkimming

Peter McNish McSkimming (1872–1941) was an independent member of parliament for the Clutha electorate in the South Island of New Zealand.

== Biography ==
New Zealand Parliament
Years	Term	Electorate	Party
1931–1935	24th	Clutha	Independent

Peter McSkimming was born on 9 March 1872 in Dreghorn, Ayrshire, Scotland, and emigrated from there with his parents Peter McSkimming and Catherine (née Pelling) alongside his three sisters. They left Scotland on 12 September 1878 on the Canterbury and arrived in Dunedin on 10 December of that year. Two more sisters were born in New Zealand. They initially settled in Lawrence before both father and son began work for John Nelson's clay pipe factory in Benhar, near Balclutha in 1881. McSkimming senior was a shrewd but humanitarian businessman, and bought the factory by the 1890s, turning it into a major manufacturer of ceramic sanitary products. The factory was renamed McSkimming Industries in 1917. When McSkimming senior died in 1923, McSkimming junior took over the factory. In 1941, the company was known as McSkimming and son.

McSkimming represented the Clutha electorate in the New Zealand House of Representatives as an independent from 1931 until his retirement in 1935. In 1935, he was awarded the King George V Silver Jubilee Medal.

McSkimming was chairman of the South Otago Freezing Co., Kaitangata Coal Co., Dominion Fertilizer Co., Bruce Woollen Co. and New Zealand Refrigerating Company

McSkimming married Agnes Jane Lowery (known as Jeannie) in 1904, and they had three sons and two daughters. Their sons remained involved in the family business, running it until it was taken over by Ceramco in 1980. Notable among their offspring was Robert Wilson "Brick" McSkimming (1916–1992), who was awarded a DFC for his work with the Royal New Zealand Air Force during World War II.

== Notes ==
New Zealand Parliament
Preceded by Fred Waite	Member of Parliament for Clutha; 1931–1935	Succeeded by James Roy
