= Darwent & Dalwood =

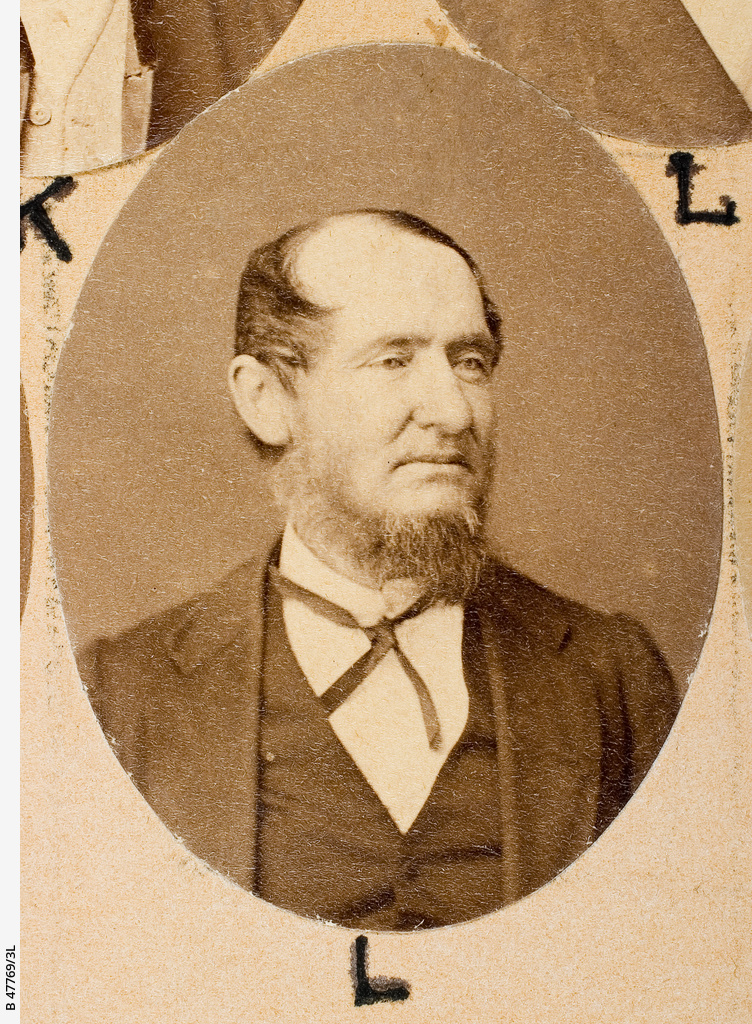
Joseph Darwent, taken 1872 by Henry Jones

Darwent & Dalwood was a partnership of Joseph Darwent and William Dalwood put together expressly to tender for work on the Overland Telegraph Line. They were contracted to build the northernmost section of the line.

== The partners ==
Accountant Joseph Darwent (c. 1824 – 20 October 1872) arrived in South Australia aboard Posthumous in June 1849 in the employ of the South Australian Railway Company, an English company touting for the contract to build a railway from Adelaide to the Port. This company amalgamated with others, to form the successful bidder, Adelaide City and Port Railway Company, of which Darwent was appointed secretary. However, by October 1851 the under-capitalised company had abandoned the project, and the Government revoked the agreement and took over construction. The first train ran on the line in 1856; the first Government-owned railway in the British Empire.

When his position at the Railway Company ended in 1851 Darwent joined the gold rush to Victoria and made a series of gold strikes in the Bendigo region that left him, "556 Pounds the richer". He returned to Adelaide and embarked on business as a shipping and stock agent with an office in Grenfell Street, as well as a wheat and flour merchant, managing for a while to corner the trade in those commodities between Adelaide and Britain and to the Americas. He was a founder of the South Australian coastal steamer trade between Port Adelaide, Wallaroo, Port Lincoln and Port Augusta, with ships Coorong, Aldinga, Omeo and Gothenburg on his books. Darwent's nephew William Royse (6 April 1838 - 10 August 1892), born in Sheffield, was in Adelaide by 1859, and in 1861 was in Dunedin, New Zealand, acting as shipping agent for Darwent's steamship Maid of the Yarra, capitalising on the burgeoning trans-Tasman trade resulting from the Otago gold rush.

Darwent married Eliza Atchison (c. 1829 – 12 March 1885) in 1852; their children included Frederick Arnold (1854), James Thornhill (1858), Frank Atchison (1859), Lucy Harriet (1861), Charles Beauchamp (1863).

Another nephew, metallurgist Joseph Darwent, jun. (1847 – 10 August 1926), born in Sheffield, married Winifred Teresa Kelly (c. 1850 – 7 January 1941) on 16 May 1869. He was a draughtsman on the telegraph line for Darwent & Dalwood. He found gold 151 miles (243 km) south of Port Darwin in 1871, but priority was disputed. He later had a property near Coonawarra, lived in Penola, where he was a member of the District Council for 35 years and chairman for 25.

William Trevett Dalwood (c. 1834 – 22 August 1909) arrived with his parents Caleb (c. 1810 – 25 September 1851) and Hannah Dalwood, née Trevett ( – 27 August 1878), a newborn brother Theophilus (died 1847) and sisters Sarah Ann (later Lethaby), Elizabeth Jane (later Baum), Achsah Mary Dalwood (married Ralph Drummond), in September 1840 aboard Lysander. Youngest son Thomas Caleb (died 1909) was a prolific portrait painter. Caleb was licensee of Park Gate Hotel, Goodwood; Hannah ran it for four years after his death.

His first employment was with a pair of oxen carting water, Adelaide not yet having the luxury of reticulated water. His business expanded to carting stone, for which there was a huge appetite, for the construction of buildings and for laying roads. He expanded his operations to quarrying and thence to mining. He was soon a director of half-a-dozen mining companies,

Dalwood married Emma Frearson on 6 September 1855. Her father was also a contractor, and in 1860 Dalwood's assistant. Their children included Frederic William, William, Augustus George, George Trevett Palmerston, Britannia Frances, Silva, Georgia Blanche, Olive Lavinia, Eva Beatrice and Constance Louise Gertrude; they had a home on Melbourne Street, North Adelaide.

== The contract ==
On 20 August 1870 SS Omeo left McLaren wharf, Port Adelaide with passengers W. A. Paqualin (supervisor), Joseph Darwent, jun., Stephen King, Charles Tym (another of Darwent's nephews), William Dalwood, and Government officers William McMinn (Overseer of Works), R. C. Burton (his assistant), J. L. Stapleton, and A. Hawley, and 75 laborers engaged by Darwent & Dalwood in steerage. Dalwood was present only as an observer, and was a passenger on the return voyage. Omeo also carried 80 draught horses, a dozen head of cattle (whether beef cattle or working bullocks was not mentioned), and provisions for the journey. In the hold were over 1,000 bundles (50) of galvanised iron telegraph wire, 3,000 insulators and other hardware.

Omeo arrived safely on 9 September, berthed at Port Darwin and was promptly unloaded. A telegraph pole was ceremoniously erected by a daughter of Capt. Bloomfield Douglas, the Government Resident. A month later, all was good news and optimism: 60 miles (97 km) of line had been erected, and work was progressing at 15 miles (24 km) per week, expecting completion in eight or nine months. Another 50 tons of wire and 3,528 insulators were despatched in February, with only the last 50 tons of wire to be shipped. In June it was anticipated the northern section would be completed ahead of time, and they could continue southward and do some of the central section.

It therefore came as a shock to people in Adelaide to learn that Overseer of Works (northern section) McMinn had taken the extreme action of cancelling Darwent & Dalwood's contract as from 3 May, and had sent all their workers back to Adelaide, on the basis of their falling so far behind that there was no prospect of completion by 1 January 1872.

They had in six months, despite the Territory's notorious wet season, erected poles to a distance of 225 miles (362 km) and strung wire for 129 miles (208 km). With the imminent dry season progress would have been many times greater. Against that however was the compounding problem of logistics over increasing distances, for which Darwent & Dalwood were probably insufficiently prepared without bringing in additional men and animals.

The sacking of the workers by McMinn was on the basis of an insurrection, denied by the men.

The Government, having determined to complete the line on time at any cost, despatched two teams, one to work south from the termination of Darwent & Dalwood's work, and the other north from the central section's termination. It was intended by Charles Todd to have a third team working simultaneously south from the Roper River, but that idea was scotched on the grounds of safety. Livestock despatched consisted of 500 bullocks and 168 horses, with wagons, harness and supplies to match. Things did not eventuate entirely as planned. Insufficient water was to be found for the bullocks and hundreds either perished of thirst or were too weak to work. In November 1871 the schooner Gulnare, which had been working as a supply vessel, struck a reef near Melville Island and had to be towed back to Darwin and abandoned. With the retirement of John Hart and reorganisation of the ministry, Charles Todd was empowered to establish a supply base on the Roper River, but it was not until May 1872 that the river had subsided sufficiently to be of any use.
The British Australian Telegraph Company completed the laying of the undersea cable from Singapore on 18 November 1871, and the Overland Telegraph Line was not completed until August 1872, but was substantially in use from May 1872 by the expedient of carrying messages by horse or camel across the uncompleted section.

In May 1875 William Dalwood brought his case for compensation before the Chief Justice and a special jury, arguing that his company had been sacked without just cause; that they could have completed the work by the deadline. His claim was denied on the grounds that he was precluded by the terms of the contract from disputing the judgment and determinations of the Overseer of Works. He was awarded £10,000 on the value of work done. (Cost to the government for their work was around £100,000 and took 18 months.)
