= Edgar Stead =

New Zealand horticulturalist, ornithologist, engineer and marksman

Edgar Fraser Stead (22 October 1881 – 7 February 1949) was a New Zealand ornithologist, engineer, horticulturist and marksman. He was born in Christchurch and educated there at Christ's College and Wanganui Collegiate School. He then studied electrical engineering at Canterbury College, followed by three years at Schenectady, New York, at the research laboratories of the General Electric Company.

Following the death of his father, George Gatonby Stead, in 1908, Stead returned to New Zealand and, in 1914, bought a property at Ilam, close to Christchurch, on 20 ha of land adjacent to the river Avon. He had inherited enough to not have to pursue a career in engineering and he devoted the rest of his life to ornithology, angling, hunting and sports shooting, as well as to growing and hybridising prize rhododendrons and azaleas on his property. His collection eventually came into the possession of the University of Canterbury, which maintains it as Ilam Gardens. He became an expert at all these pursuits and acquired an international reputation for his marksmanship, winning competitions at Monte Carlo and elsewhere. He frequently travelled to Britain where he acted as a rhododendron judge at the Chelsea Flower Show. In 1915 he married Irene Mary Phillips in Christchurch, with whom he had a son, Roland.

== Ornithology ==
Stead acquired a detailed knowledge of the birds of Canterbury, as well as of New Zealand's offshore islands through many field trips. He built up an important collection of skins and eggs which was bequeathed to the Canterbury Museum. He wrote many papers for the Transactions and Proceedings of the Royal Society of New Zealand and other journals, as well as a book, The Life Histories of New Zealand Birds, published in 1932. He named two new subspecies of fernbird and a new subspecies of bush wren from Stewart Island (Stead's bush wren, Xenicus longipes variabilis). His field studies and contributions to natural history and ornithology were recognised in 1948 by his election as a fellow of the Royal Society of New Zealand.

Stead died at his home in Ilam, survived by his wife and Roland. In 2011, Roland left $110,000 for the maintenance of the Ilam gardens.
