= Fred Waite (politician) =

New Zealand politician (1885–1952)

The Honourable Fred Waite CMG, DSO, OBE, VD
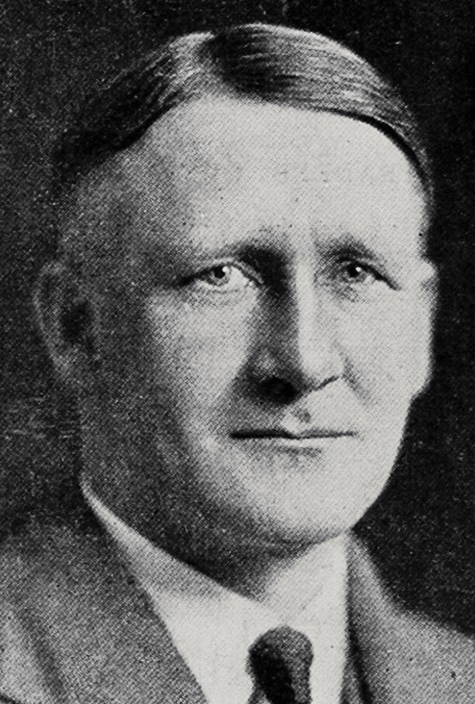
- Waite, c. 1928

Member of Parliament, Clutha
- In office 4 November 1925 – 12 November 1931
- Preceded by: John Edie
- Succeeded by: Peter McSkimming

Member of the New Zealand Legislative Council
- In office 22 June 1934 – 31 December 1951

Personal details
- Born: 21 August 1885 Dunedin, New Zealand
- Died: 29 August 1952 (aged 67) Balclutha, New Zealand

Military service
- Branch/service: New Zealand Military Forces
- Years of service: 1914–19; 1940–46
- Rank: Colonel
- Battles/wars: First World War; Gallipoli campaign; Western Front; Second World War
- Awards: Companion of the Order of St Michael and St George; Officer of the Order of the British Empire; Distinguished Service Order

Fred Waite, CMG, DSO, OBE, VD (21 August 1885 – 29 August 1952) was a New Zealand farmer, historian, politician, and soldier who served in both the First and Second World Wars.

Born in Dunedin, Waite was a farmer at the outbreak of the First World War. He joined the New Zealand Expeditionary Force (NZEF) and served in the Gallipoli Campaign, during which he received the Distinguished Service Order. He was evacuated from Gallipoli due to sickness and repatriated to New Zealand, where he saw out the war as an instructor in NZEF training camps. He wrote a history of New Zealand's military efforts during the Gallipoli Campaign that was published in 1919. He returned to his farm and soon became involved in politics, joining the Reform Party. In 1925 he was elected Member of Parliament for the Clutha electorate, serving two terms. He was appointed to the Legislative Council in 1934. During the Second World War, Waite was overseas commissioner for the National Patriotic Fund Board and was appointed an Officer of the Order of the British Empire for his services in this role. Two years later he was appointed a Companion of the Order of St Michael and St George. He died in 1952 at the age of 67.

== Early life ==
Waite was born in Dunedin on 21 August 1885, one of eight children of George Waite, a storekeeper, and his wife. After leaving Mornington School, he worked for the regional newspaper, the Otago Daily Times, and for the Otago Witness. He was a typesetter when he married Ada Taylor in 1912 but the following year took up farming near Balclutha. He was interested in the military and was a member of an engineers unit in the Volunteer Force, which was later re-organised into the Territorial Force (TF).

== First World War ==
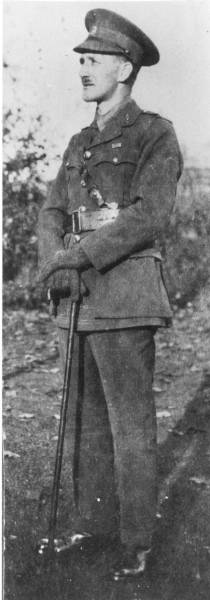
Waite during World War I

Following the outbreak of the First World War in the summer of 1914, Waite volunteered for the New Zealand Expeditionary Force (NZEF) that was being raised for service overseas. He also undertook to send dispatches from the front for his previous employer, the Otago Witness, but this work proved short-lived when he became a censor as part of his military duties. He was posted as a lieutenant in the New Zealand Engineers and sailed with the main body of the NZEF to the Middle East in October 1914.

Promoted to captain, Waite participated in the Gallipoli campaign. In early May 1915, he restored order amongst personnel of the Otago Infantry Battalion following a failed attack on Turkish positions. He was awarded the Distinguished Service Order, the citation reading:

For gallantry and devotion to duty in connection with the operations at the Dardanelles (Mediterranean Expeditionary Force). On the night of 2–3 May 1915 during the operations in the neighbourhood of Gape Tepe for gallantry and resource in rallying his men, and leading them forward at critical moments.

Later in the campaign Waite served as the adjutant of the New Zealand Engineers and was twice mentioned in dispatches. Evacuated to England with dysentery, he was repatriated to New Zealand in 1916. His service with the NZEF ceased and he returned to the TF in his pre-war rank of major. He took up an appointment as Chief Engineer Instructor of the NZEF training camps.

Shortly before the end of the war, Waite wrote a brief account of New Zealand's contributions to the Gallipoli Campaign. Authorities invited him to prepare a more substantial work and this resulted in The New Zealanders at Gallipoli, the first volume in a series of the Official History of New Zealand's Effort in the Great War, published in 1919. Two years later it was republished as a revised edition.

The figure of 8556 New Zealand soldiers who served at Gallipoli given by General Ian Hamilton in his forward to Waite’s demi-official 1919 history was always known to be too low; as Waite himself thought at the time. Between 16,000 (perhaps 17,000) served there, as shown in a 2019 study by New Zealand historians John Crawford and Matthew Buck.

Waite also worked on the production of the three other volumes in the series, which were published around the same time.

== Interwar period ==
After the war, Waite returned to his Balclutha property which he converted to dairy farming. He remained a member of the TF for several years and was a major in the Otago Mounted Rifles Regiment before being promoted to lieutenant colonel and becoming its commander from 1927 to 1930. For his prolonged service with the TF, he eventually received the Colonial Auxiliary Forces Officers' Decoration. In 1935 he was awarded the King George V Silver Jubilee Medal. Already involved in the dairying industry, he began to participate in the governance of the sector and set up the Co-Operative Dairy Company of Otago. He later joined the New Zealand Farmer's Union and was president of its Otago Branch.

New Zealand Parliament
Years	Term	Electorate	Party
1925–1928	22nd	Clutha	Reform
1928–1931	23rd	Clutha	Reform

As well as his work in the dairying sector, Waite soon became involved in local politics and joined the Reform Party. He first stood for election to the House of Representatives in 1925, when he defeated the incumbent in the Clutha electorate, John Edie of the Liberal Party, with ease. He was one of 13 new members in a House of 80 representatives. In the 1928 election, he was challenged by Joseph Stephens, who was an independent candidate describing himself as Liberal–Labour. Waite had a 523-vote margin, which represented 6.5% of the valid votes. In the 1931 election, Waite was defeated by Peter McSkimming, who stood as an independent, but had links to the United Party.

Prime Minister George Forbes had not made appointments to the Legislative Council since 1930, with the exception of James Parr in 1931, and membership dwindled during the years of the Great Depression. By 1934, the membership had reduced to 19, the lowest since 1860, with two members about to retire. In 1934, 14 new members were appointed by Forbes, including Waite. All appointments became effective on 22 June 1934, and Waite, at age 49, was the second youngest of the intake; only Vincent Ward was younger. Waite was reappointed twice, and served until the abolition of the Upper House in 1950.

When the National Party was formed in 1936 from the merger of Reform and the United Party, publicity was one of the major considerations. The party's provisional council established a sub-committee consisting of Henry Livingstone, Frederick Doidge, and Waite. This committee reported back in February 1937, recommending the establishment of a Dominion publicity committee, and a trustee company for the purpose of publishing a party newsletter. Party Publications Ltd was thus created, and Waite was the first editor of The National News. Initially, all financial members were to receive this monthly newsletter, aimed at being a counterpart to Labour's Standard. While The National News performed an important function during the party's formative years, the venture was expensive and following the 1938 election, it was changed to a quarterly schedule, before being discontinued in September 1939 just after the outbreak of the war.

The seven-member Dominion publicity committee, of which Waite was a member, engaged three advertising companies to jointly prepare for the 1938 election. Two of those companies, John Ilott and Charles Haines, remained joint agents for the National Party until 1973.

== Second World War ==
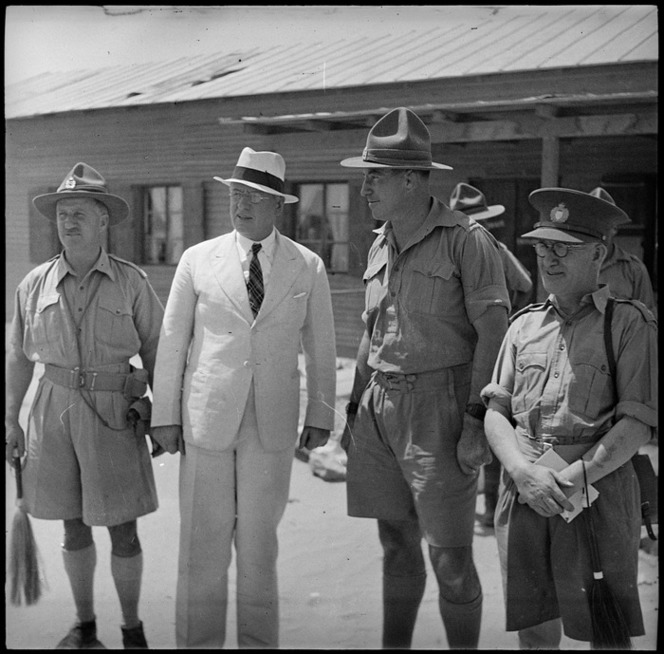
Lieutenant Colonel Waite (far right) with Prime Minister Peter Fraser (in white suit), visiting the Infantry Training Depot at Maadi Camp in Egypt, May 1941

When the Second World War began, Waite was still a lieutenant colonel in the TF. He was appointed overseas commissioner for the National Patriotic Fund Board. Based in Egypt, he worked to provide the soldiers of the Second New Zealand Expeditionary Force with special supplies and treats. His services in this capacity were recognised in 1944 with his appointment as an Officer of the Order of the British Empire. He finished the war a colonel, working in Europe on the repatriation of New Zealand personnel recently released from prisoner-of-war camps in Germany. In 1946, he travelled to Japan to inspect the infrastructure set up for J-Force, New Zealand's contribution to the British Commonwealth Occupation Force, following which he retired from the military. In the 1946 King's Birthday Honours, he was appointed a Companion of the Order of St Michael and St George.

== Later life ==
In his retirement, Waite wrote papers on archeology and history including one on Egyptian pottery. While in Cairo during the Second World War, he collected several historical antiquities on behalf of the Otago Museum. In 1951 Waite was granted the right to retain the title of "Honourable", having served more than 10 years as a member of the Legislative Council. In his later years, his health was poor and he died in Balclutha in 1952 at the age of 67. He was survived by his wife and a daughter.

== Notes ==
New Zealand Parliament
Preceded by John Edie	Member of Parliament for Clutha; 1925–1931	Succeeded by Peter McSkimming
