= Peter McSkimming (manufacturer) =

New Zealand grocer, goldminer, brick and pipe manufacturer (1847–1923)

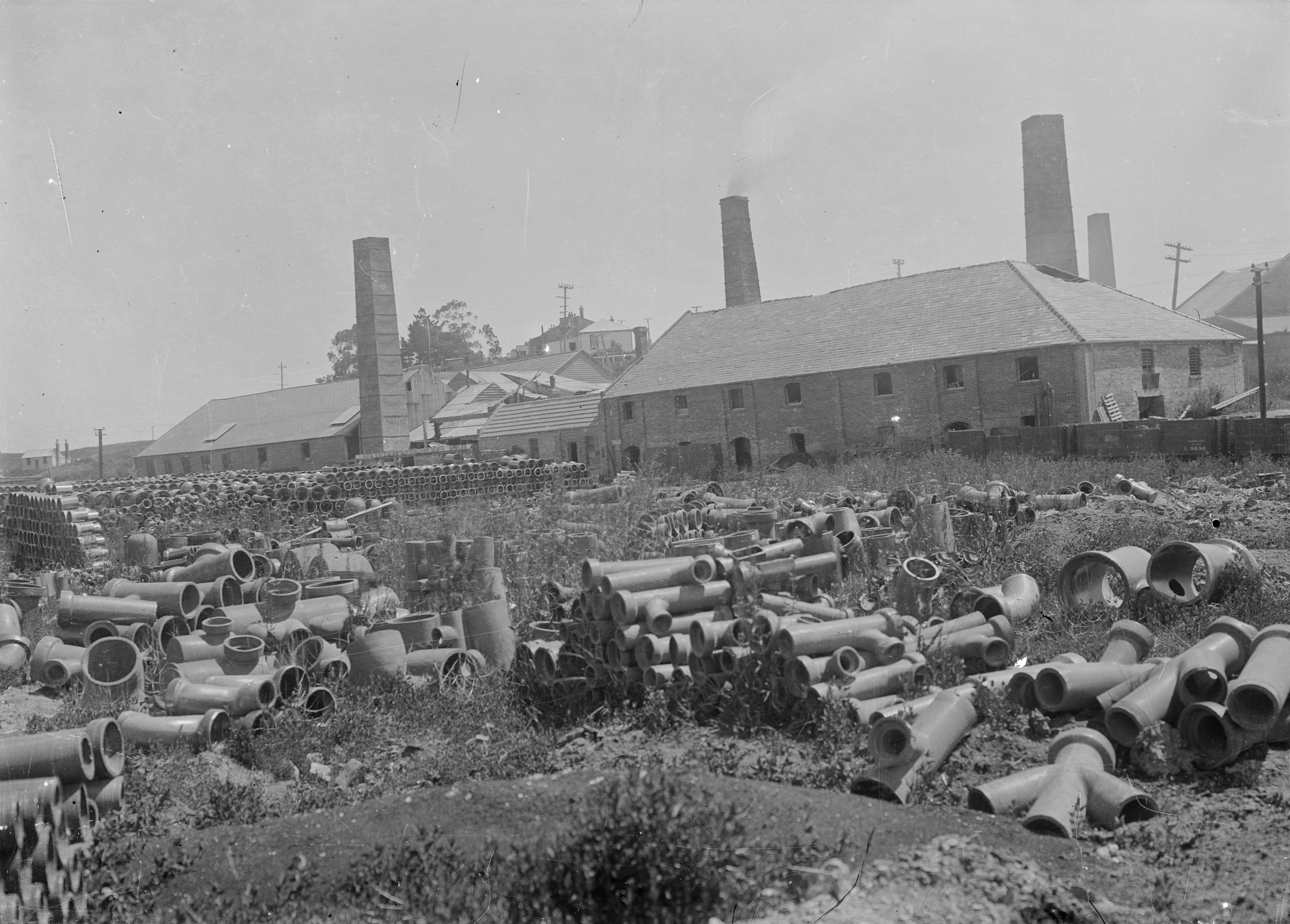
Ceramic pipes outside the McSkimming brickworks at Benhar in 1926

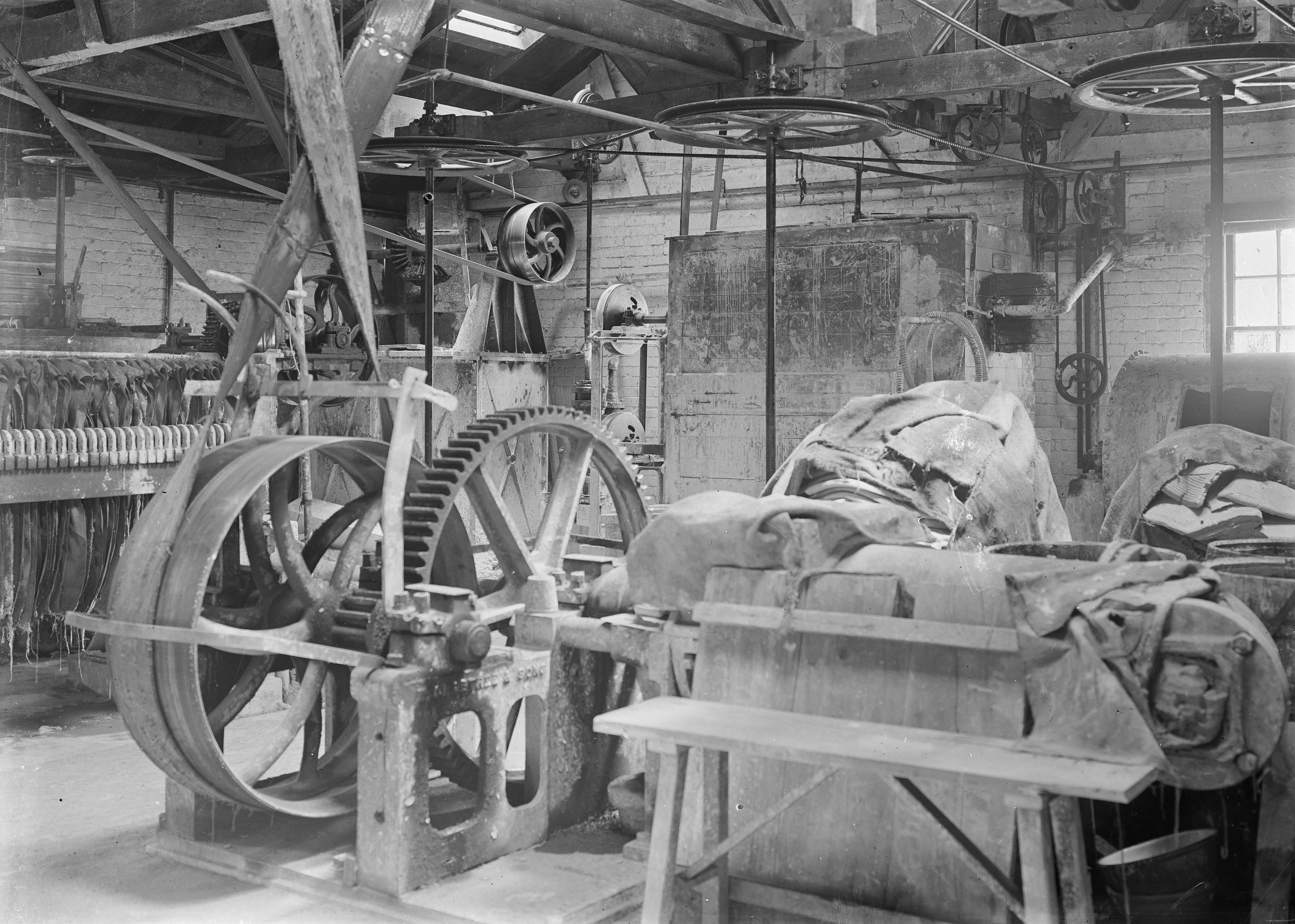
Interior view of the brickworks at Benhar

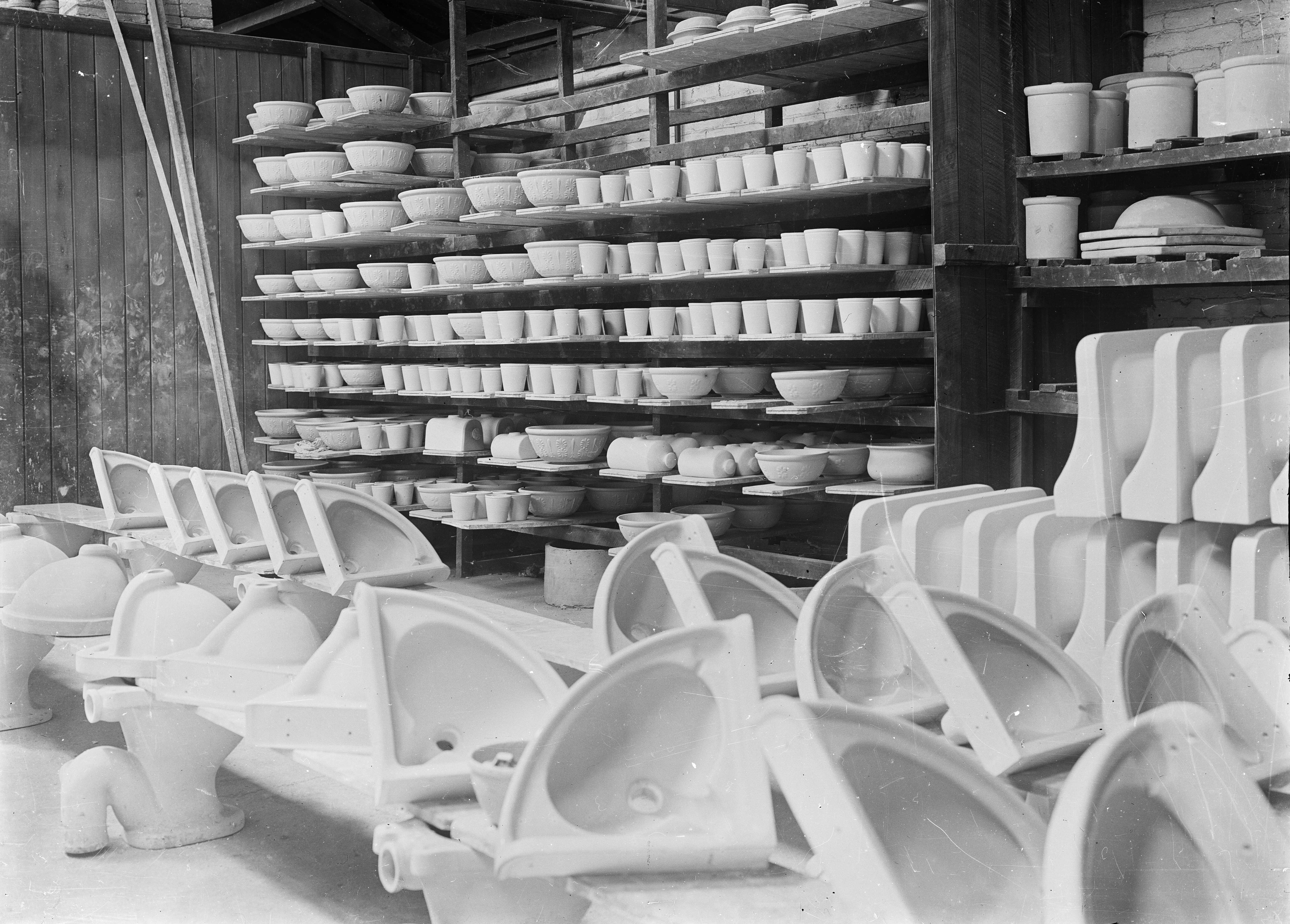
Interior view of the pottery works at Benhar

Peter McSkimming (1848 – 3 November 1923) was a Scottish-born manufacturer in New Zealand. He owned McSkimming and son, a pipe, sanitary ware, and glazed bricks manufacturer. After his death, his company became the leading manufacturer of earthenware pipes in the country.

McSkimming was born in Auchenheath, Lanarkshire, Scotland in 1848. In his early years, he lived in Lanarkshire and Ayrshire. He started work aged nine at tileworks. On 22 October 1869, he married Catherine Pelling. They left Scotland on 12 September 1878 on the Canterbury and arrived three months later, on 10 December, at Port Chalmers, New Zealand, the port that services Dunedin. At the time, they had three girls and one boy (also Peter McSkimming). They had two further girls in New Zealand.

The family lived for three years in Lawrence, where McSkimming was a grocer, and a year in Waitahuna, where he was a gold miner. After that, they lived in Stirling, with Peter McSkimmings senior and junior working at John Nelson's Benhar pipe works. They then leased the pipe works on a 20-year term before buying the factory in 1894. Through a transfer in shareholding, they later merged with another pipe manufacturer.

From early in his career McSkimming became interested in the development of sanitary ceramic products — such as washbasins, glazed bricks, and toilet bowls — and began making enamelled ceramics. To this end he sent his son-in-law, Parker McKinlay, to Britain to gain expertise in bathroomware manufacture in 1908.

McSkimming was known for his philanthropic work and as a generous employer, building houses for his staff and donating to local causes. He was also a religious man, refusing to use his kilns on Sundays and campaigning for prohibition.

McSkimming's wife died in 1914 and in the following year, he married Mary Davidson Barty. McSkimming senior died on 3 November 1923 at Benhar. The company was taken over by McSkimming junior and McKinlay, who was married to the family's eldest daughter, Helen. They developed the company to the leading manufacturer of earthenware pipes in New Zealand.
