= Charles Richards Allen =

New Zealand author (1885–1962)

Charles Richards Allen (3 May 1885 – 14 March 1962) was a New Zealand author. He was the son of politician and diplomat James Allen. Despite blindness, he published three novels set in England and three set in New Zealand, as well as assorted plays and poetry. He also edited a collection of short stories, Tales by New Zealanders.

Allen was born in London and came to Dunedin as a child. He was educated at Otago Boys' High School. He enrolled at the University of Cambridge, but dropped out due to his deteriorating eyesight. He subsequently trained for the clergy, and served as a deacon at All Saints' Church, Dunedin from 1909 to 1916. In 1916 he resigned from the church, having become totally blind, and turned to literary work. He wrote by dictation, or by typing and having his amanuensis polish the manuscript. His early work was set in England, where he had lived from 1919 to 1926. His later work was set in New Zealand (and specifically Dunedin), and was semi-autobiographical. In 1941 almost all copies of his final novel, The Young Pretender, were destroyed in London by a German bombing raid, and after that he focused on writing poetry and literary criticism. In 1950 he began publishing a literary magazine, "The Wooden Horse", but it failed in 1951 after eight issues.

In December 1949 he married Florence Stubbs in Dunedin.

== Works ==
- The Ship Beautiful (1925)
- Brown Smock (1926)
- Tarry, Knight (1927)
- A Poor Scholar: A Tale of Progress (1936)^{PAPERS PAST}
- The Hedge Sparrow (1937)
- The Young Pretender (1939)
- Tales by New Zealanders (ed) (1938)
- Local habitation (serial; incomplete)
