= William Royse =

New Zealander businessman

William Royse (6 April 1838 – 10 August 1892) was a Dunedin-based businessman active in New Zealand from 1861 until his death in 1892.

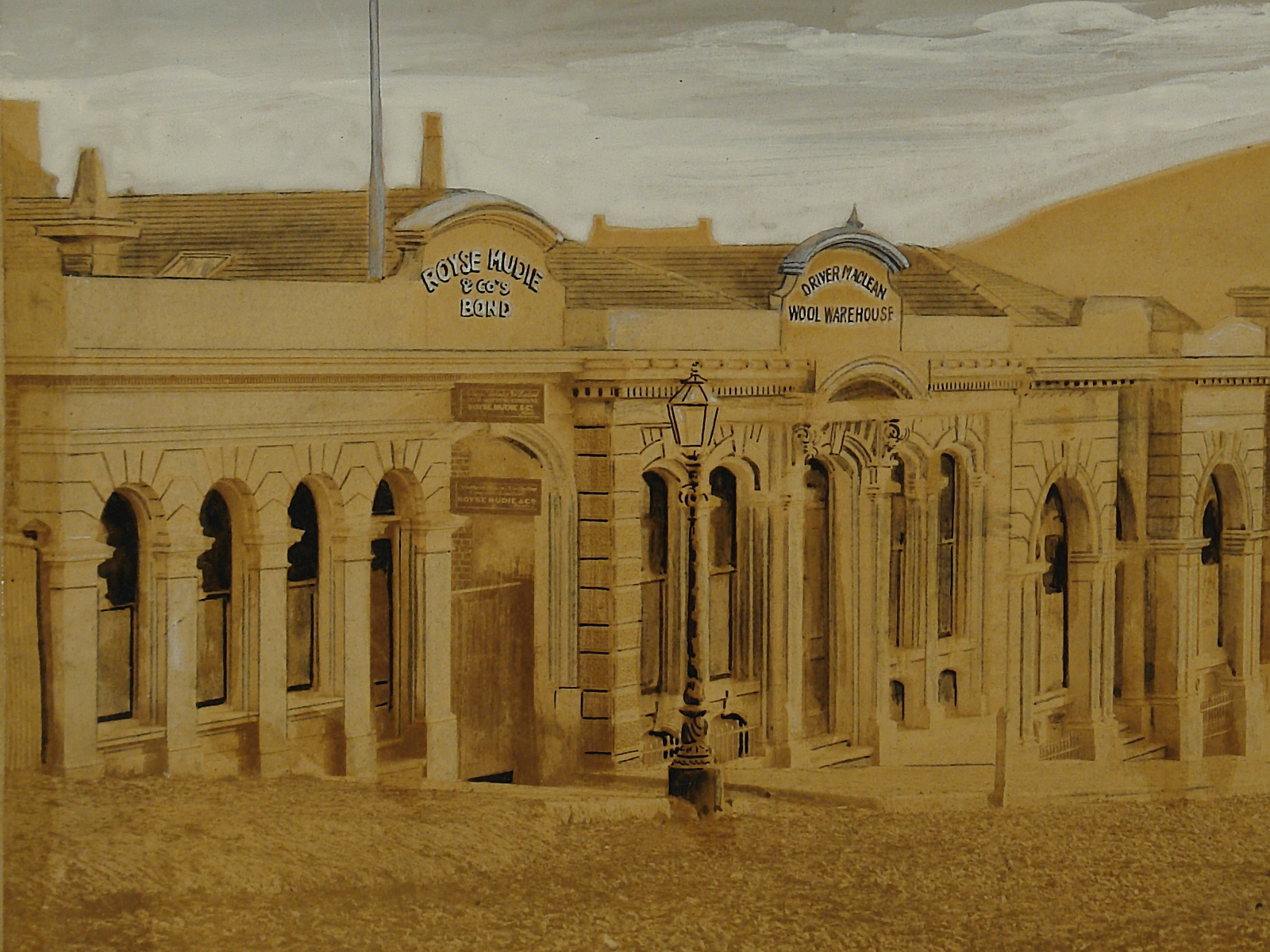
Royse Mudie & Co's Bond, High St, Dunedin, New Zealand circa 1865

== Early life ==
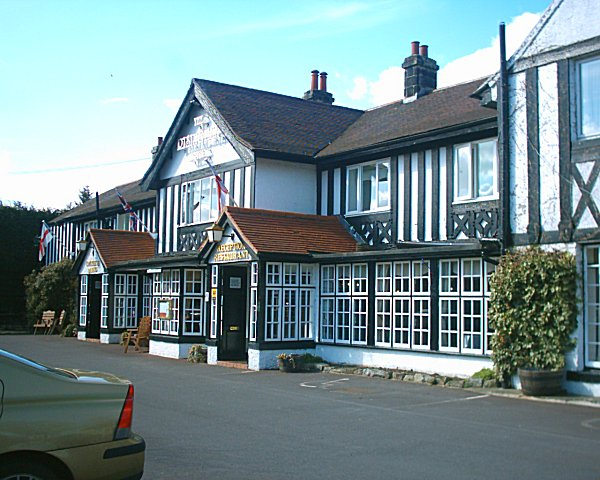
The Rising Sun, taken 14 April 2006

William Royse was born in Sheffield, England on 6 April 1838, to Isaac and Rachel Royse (née Darwent). Rachel's parents William and Sarah Darwent were the freeholders and victuallers of the Rising Sun Public House on Thornhill Moor in the Peak District, Derbyshire.

Royse went to school at Hall Cross Academy, Doncaster. In 1859, at age 21, he left for Australia to join his uncle, Joseph Darwent.

Darwent had gone to Australia in 1849 to become Secretary of the Adelaide City and Port Railway Company. When the undercapitalised Railway Company abandoned the city to port project Darwent headed to the Victorian gold diggings at Bendigo and made a series of large gold strikes that enabled him to establish a trading and shipping company based in Adelaide.

== Business career ==
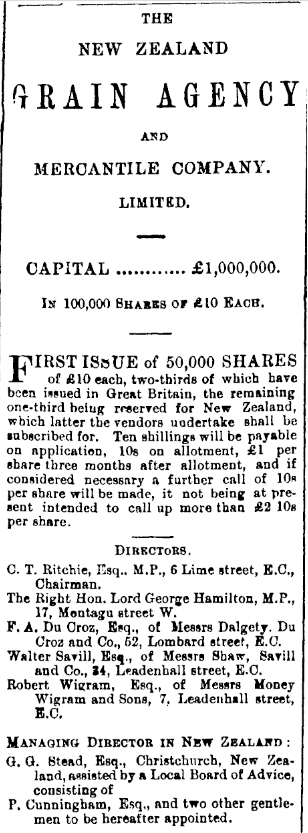
NZ Grain Agency & Mercantile Co. - Southland Times 1 Feb 1882

In 1861, as the Otago gold rush was getting underway, Royse went to Dunedin, New Zealand, as the shipping agent for Darwent's steamship Maid of the Yarra. The following year the partnership with his uncle was dissolved, and Royse formed Royse, Mudie & Co. with John Bell Mudie, trading in Dunedin as merchants, shipping and commission agents, and bonded warehousemen. They continued to represent ships connected with Darwent, notably Aldinga and Omeo, on the Adelaide, Melbourne, Otago route managed by McMeckan, Blackwood & Co.

In 1866, trading as Royse, Mudie and Miller, the business offered "Liberal Advances on every description of Stock and Station Securities", with an office in Oamaru, and agents representing it in London, Timaru, Christchurch, Hokitika and Melbourne. By 1868 Royse and Mudie were in financial difficulties. A large grain speculation venture they supplied had failed and later ended up in the Supreme Court, and on 25 November 1868, in Hokitika, William Royse filed notice of his inability to meet his creditors under the Bankruptcy Act.

However his bankruptcy was short-lived. On 15 December 1868, at Westland District Court, his last financial examination and application for discharge from bankruptcy was fixed for 5 January 1869, and Royse's lawyer applied for him to be excused, so he could depart for Adelaide. Royse sailed for South Australia on the Omeo on 22 December 1868. Prior to his departure, he was wished God speed at an evening at the Grand Hotel, attended by a number of the leading citizens of Hokitika, where the wines flowed in abundance. John Bell Mudie was declared bankrupt in the Supreme Court on 22 February 1869.

On 2 September 1869, at Holy Trinity Church in East Melbourne, William Royse married Catherine (Kate) McCrae (28 April 1842 – 24 April 1918). In 1871 he and Catherine arrived in Christchurch, New Zealand, and built a home, now named Dorset House, at 112 Park Terrace (now 1 Dorset St), opposite Hagley Park. The same year Royse entered into a partnership with George Gatonby Stead, forming Royse, Stead & Co. This business built up extensive interests as grain traders, shipping agents, brick makers, maltsters, and property developers, among other activities.

Royse also invested in sheep farming in Hawkes Bay in the North Island, where he owned 23,479 acres of Kereru Station, and established an award-winning merino stud with Mr John Anderson of Otago.

In 1881 Royse, Stead & Co. won a first prize at the Melbourne International Exhibition for twelve samples of cereals. They also exhibited at the New Zealand International Exhibition, 1882 in Christchurch, showing specimens of European flax and wheat, grown in Hawkes Bay.

In 1882 Royse sold out of Royse, Stead & Co to facilitate the formation of The New Zealand Grain Agency and Mercantile Company Limited, floated in Great Britain and New Zealand with a capital of £1,000,000. This business failed in 1884 due to drought and the long depression of the 1880s.

Royse, now based back in Dunedin, set about developing a large landholding for sheep farming in Southland on the Mataura River down to Toetoes Bay, consisting of four properties, Birchwood, Thornhill, Ocean View and Springfield, totaling 8,568 acres.

In Dunedin he owned the family home, Leith House, and the nearby Royse's mill and bakery. He also owned Donaghy's Rope with Alfred Lee Smith, and was a long-time director of the Standard Insurance Company. He died of heart failure in 1892, aged 54.

== Family ==
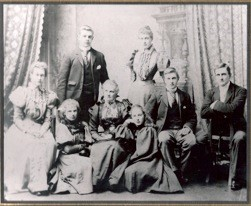
Catherine Royse (centre) with her children, Dunedin c.1896

William and Catherine had eight children – Elsie Frances, Kate, George Herbert, Mary Adelaide (died 1881, aged 5 years), William Graham, Reginald Thornhill, Nora Bell Eaton, and Olive Lee Darwent. The family's lives were much reported in the social columns of Dunedin's newspapers, and their circle of friends included William and Rachel Hodgkins, and their children Isabel and Frances Hodgkins. After William's death Catherine sold the remaining farms, and continued family life in Dunedin. She died in 1918 and was laid to rest in the family plot at Dunedin Northern Cemetery with William and Mary Adelaide.
