= Alexander Malcolm (politician) =

New Zealand politician (1864–1956)

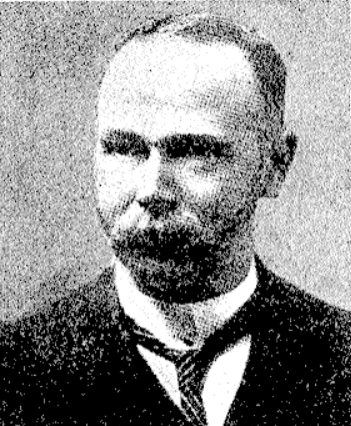
Malcolm in c. 1914

Alexander Scott Malcolm (1 July 1864 – 19 July 1956) was an independent conservative and then Reform Party Member of Parliament and advocate of prohibition in New Zealand.

== Private life ==
He was born in Mansfield, England and educated at Horton College, Tasmania and the University of Otago where he was Macandrew Scholar in Political Science. He was a teacher at Kelso School, and was secretary of the Clutha No-Licence League when after passing of the 1893 Act allowing local "no-licence" polls Clutha became the first "dry" district. He supported prohibition in Parliament, and the South Otago Hospital Board of which he was a foundation member and chairman from 1923 to 1926. The South Otago Hospital in Balclutha was opened in 1926, as was the South Otago High School.

== Member of Parliament ==
New Zealand Parliament
| Years | Term | Electorate | Party |
|---|---|---|---|
| 1905–1908 | 16th | Clutha | Independent |
| 1908–1909 | 17th | Clutha | Independent |
| 1909–1911 | Changed allegiance to: | | Reform |
| 1911–1914 | 18th | Clutha | Reform |
| 1914–1919 | 19th | Clutha | Reform |
| 1919–1922 | 20th | Clutha | Reform |

He was elected to the Clutha electorate in the 1905 general election, after being unsuccessful in 1899.

He was defeated in 1922. He was Chairman of Committees for three terms: 4 July 1913 to 20 November 1914, 7 July 1915 to 27 November 1919 and 15 July 1920 to 30 November 1922.

He was appointed to the Legislative Council on 16 June 1924 and served for one term until 15 June 1931, when his term ended.

== Later life ==
He married Flora Jack of Hokitika in 1893. He was an elder of the Balclutha Presbyterian Church. He died in Dunedin in 1956, aged 92.

== Notes ==
Political offices
| Preceded by Frederic Lang | Chairman of Committees of the House of Representatives; 1913–1922 | Succeeded by Alexander Young |
New Zealand Parliament
| Preceded by James William Thomson | Member of Parliament for Clutha; 1905–1922 | Succeeded by John Edie |
