= Clutha (electorate) =

Clutha was a New Zealand parliamentary electorate from 1866 to 1996.

== Population centres ==
In the 1865 electoral redistribution, the House of Representatives focussed its review of electorates to South Island electorates only, as the Otago gold rush had caused significant population growth, and a redistribution of the existing population. Fifteen additional South Island electorates were created, including Clutha, and the number of Members of Parliament was increased by 13 to 70.

This electorate covered South Otago and contained the settlements of Balclutha, Kaitangata, and Owaka. It was later enlarged to include much of the Bruce electorate, Including the town of Milton.

== History ==
The electorate was established in 1865 for the 1866 election. The first representative was James Macandrew, who had served on all previous parliaments. At the 1871 election, Macandrew successfully stood in the Port Chalmers, and Clutha was won by James Thomson. In the 1887 election, Thomson was defeated by Thomas Mackenzie. Mackenzie retired from Parliament at the end of the third term for Clutha in 1896.

The 1896 election was won by James Thomson, who thus started his second period of service. Thomson retired after three terms in 1905, and this was also the end of his political career.

- Alexander Malcolm 1905–22
- John Edie 1922–25
- Fred Waite 1925–31
- Peter McSkimming 1931–35

In the 1996 election, the first MMP election, the electorate was combined with the adjacent Wallace electorate into the Clutha-Southland electorate.

=== Members of Parliament ===
The electorate was represented by ten Members of Parliament:

Key

Independent Liberal Conservative Reform National

Election	Winner
1866 election	James Macandrew
1871 election	James Thomson
1876 election	James Thomson
1879 election	James Thomson
1881 election	James Thomson
1884 election	James Thomson
1887 election	Thomas Mackenzie
1890 election	Thomas Mackenzie
1893 election	Thomas Mackenzie
1896 election	James Thomson
1899 election	James Thomson
1902 election	James Thomson
1905 election	Alexander Malcolm
1908 election	Alexander Malcolm
1911 election	Alexander Malcolm
1914 election	Alexander Malcolm
1919 election	Alexander Malcolm
1922 election	John Edie
1925 election	Fred Waite
1928 election	Fred Waite
1931 election	Peter McSkimming
1935 election	James Roy (Note: James Roy was elected as an independent supporting the United–Reform Coalition in 1935, and in 1936 he joined the National Party.)
1938 election	James Roy
1943 election	James Roy
1946 election	James Roy
1949 election	James Roy
1951 election	James Roy
1954 election	James Roy
1958 election (Note: Vote was postponed to 18 January 1958 as the original Labour candidate, Bruce Waters, died on 29 November 1957, one day before the election.)	James Roy
1960 election	Peter Gordon
1963 election	Peter Gordon
1966 election	Peter Gordon
1969 election	Peter Gordon
1972 election	Peter Gordon
1975 election	Peter Gordon
1978 election	Robin Gray
1981 election	Robin Gray
1984 election	Robin Gray
1987 election	Robin Gray
1990 election	Robin Gray
1993 election	Robin Gray
(Electorate abolished in 1996; see Clutha-Southland)

== Election results ==
=== 1958 supplementary election ===
1958 supplementary election: Clutha
Party	Candidate	Votes	%	±%
National	James Roy	7,187	57.35	+9.09
Labour	Joseph Fahey	5,015	40.02	
Social Credit	Colin Aberdeen	328	2.61	−10.50
Majority		2,172	17.33	+7.69
Turnout		12,530	81.86	−21.01
Registered electors		15,306		

On 26 November 1957, Bruce Waters, the Labour candidate for Clutha was admitted to Balclutha Public Hospital after a car collision. As a result Waters was unable to engage in any further election campaigning. Due to this development the National and Social Credit candidates cancelled their remaining campaign meetings. Waters died on 29 November causing the election to be delayed. On December 4, after the general election, the outgoing Prime Minister (Keith Holyoake) and incoming Prime Minister (Walter Nash) agreed that the election for Clutha would be held on 18 January. In the intervening time between when the election was scheduled for and the reassigned date one candidate withdrew, Bill Caldwell, who had previously intended to stand as an independent National candidate. Labour selected Joseph Fahey, a farmer from Lawrence, as Waters' replacement to contest the seat on 20 December. When the election was finally held, National candidate James Roy won by a margin of 2,172 votes.

=== 1931 election ===
1931 general election: Clutha
Party	Candidate	Votes	%	±%
Independent	Peter McSkimming (Note: McSkimming was affiliated with the United Party.)	4,751	59.60	
Reform	Fred Waite	3,221	40.40	−12.82
Majority		1,530	19.19	+12.75
Informal votes		145	1.79	
Turnout		8,117	86.68	−2.82
Registered electors		9,364		

=== 1928 election ===
1928 general election: Clutha
Party	Candidate	Votes	%	±%
Reform	Fred Waite	4,318	53.22	+1.84
Liberal–Labour	Joseph Stephens	3,795	46.78	
Majority		523	6.45	−15.04
Turnout		8,175	89.50	+6.92
Registered electors		9,134		

=== 1925 election ===
1925 general election: Clutha
Party	Candidate	Votes	%	±%
Reform	Fred Waite	3,604	51.38	
Liberal	John Edie	2,097	29.90	
Labour	John W Fenton	1,313	18.72	
Majority		1,507	21.49	

=== 1899 election ===
1899 general election: Clutha
Party	Candidate	Votes	%	±%
Conservative	James William Thomson	1,809	48.55	
Liberal	Finlay McLeod	1,312	35.21	
Independent	Alexander Malcolm	605	16.24	
Majority		497	13.34	
Turnout		3,726	75.65	
Registered electors		4,925		

=== 1893 election ===
1893 general election: Clutha
Party	Candidate	Votes	%	±%
Independent	Thomas Mackenzie	1,971	63.38	
Liberal	James Brugh	1,139	36.62	
Majority		832	26.75	
Turnout		3,110	75.50	
Registered electors		4,119		
