= Divers hands =

Divers hands (or more rarely dyvers hands), is an archaic phrase used to refer to a project that has been contributed to by many people. Divers is a word of Latin origin (diversus) that is still commonly used in modern French language; it literally means "many and varied". This usage of the word Divers can be found in the Bible and other older texts, but it is not commonly used in modern English. The phrase is still used to refer to the authorship of plays, essay collections, and short story collections by multiple authors.

== Divers hands in the past ==
The oldest usage of the term to date online is William Strachey A True Reportory of the Wrack (1610) "Fowl there is great store, small birds, sparrows fat and plump like a bunting, bigger than ours, robins of divers colors green and yellow, ordinary and familiar in our cabins, and, other of less sort;"

There does not appear to be the use of 'divers hands' in the English bible itself, but often in scholarly works about the bible. There are several uses of the word 'divers', however. For example, in the King James version of the Bible, 2 Samuel 13:19 "And Tamar put ashes on her head, and rent her garment of divers colours that was on her, and laid her hand on her head, and went on crying."

The very rare alternative spelling 'dyvers hands' was historically used, for instance in the parish records of St John in Bedwardine, Worcestershire, England "that 'thro' dyvers hands it came to Mr. Thomas Hall of Henwyke, the father of John Hall."

== Divers hands and the Cthulhu Mythos ==
The most common modern-day usage of divers hands is found in the stories of the Cthulhu Mythos, created by H. P. Lovecraft and expanded by other authors. How the term originated and why it regularly came to be used to refer to Cthulhu Mythos stories is unknown. It was originated either by Lovecraft himself or by his protégé August Derleth, who first published many of Lovecraft's works.

Derleth's publishing company, Arkham House, was the first to codify this usage with their publication of The Shuttered House and Other Rooms (1959), and later The Dark Brotherhood and Other Pieces (1966). Each was bylined "H. P. Lovecraft and Divers Hands", and each included original stories and poems by H. P. Lovecraft as well as derivative works and essays by other notables, including Fritz Leiber and Jack L. Chalker.

The phrase can be found in reference to many of the original weird fiction writers, including not just Lovecraft but also Clark Ashton Smith. It has also been used in many modern collections, such as the Call of Cthulhu books.

== Divers hands today ==
The most common non-Chthulhu Mythos usage of the term 'divers hands' is "By (someone's real name) and Divers Hands", which tells people that the principal author wants to give credit to all the others who contributed. Example:

- Notes on League of Extraordinary Gentlemen hardcover edition, by Jess Nevins and divers hands This is deeply annotated study of all the eclectic literary references from the comic book.

The second most common usage of 'divers hands' is when you need to list name an author in an alphabetic list and when there isn't any author's name, use 'divers hands'.

- For instance, in the index for the magazine Baryon there are many entries for the author 'Divers Hands'
- In this SF Fiction Mags Index 'divers hands' is listed in Stories by Author - Section D

Otherwise, most of the usage seen for 'divers hands' is in literary criticism, for instance:

- From Happy Knack: "Depending on how the next volume pans out, the complete Life is going to be at least treble and possibly quadruple the size of your average biography of Auden, Eliot or Pound, and might even outdo the Bible, which was of course written by divers hands, over a 1500-year period, and may have been assisted in its composition by the Spirit of God Him or Herself."
- Essays by Divers Hands: Being the Transactions of the Royal Society of Literature New Series, XLIV
