= James Roy (politician) =

New Zealand politician (1893–1971)

James Roy MC*
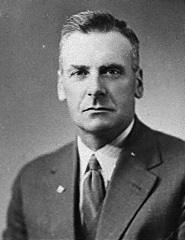

Member of the New Zealand Parliament for Clutha
- In office 27 November 1935 – 26 November 1960
- Preceded by: Peter McSkimming
- Succeeded by: Peter Gordon

Personal details
- Born: 3 March 1893 Wairuna, New Zealand
- Died: 26 May 1971 (aged 78) Dunedin, New Zealand
- Party: National
- Children: 2
- Profession: Farmer

James Alexander McLean Roy MC* (3 March 1893 – 26 May 1971) was a New Zealand politician of the National Party.

== Biography ==
=== Early life and career ===
He was born and educated in Wairuna near Clinton. He farmed on his father's farm in Wairuna, and his own farm in Cave, South Canterbury. In World War I he was a lieutenant and was awarded the Military Cross and bar, and his medals are on display at the National Army Museum in Waiouru. The citation for his MC reads as follows:

For conspicuous gallantry and devotion to duty. When the enemy attacked in force, the section occupied by this officer's platoon found a salient of advanced posts on which the brunt of the attack fell. He went from post to post, cheering and steadying the garrisons, and setting such a fine example that the enemy were completely held up by his platoon. When the enemy tried to push up to the posts through an old communication trench, he met them with bombers, and swept the open ground with a Lewis gun, inflicting a great number of casualties.

His second citation, for actions on 9 November 1918, reads:

For conspicuous gallantry and devotion to duty. Accompanied by one man, he raided the enemy’s trenches, and under cover of trench-mortar bombardment proceeded down an old sap towards a machine gun post. As soon as the bombardment lifted he rushed in and captured two of the enemy and brought them back to his lines. He twice went back, and captured two more prisoners and a machine gun. He showed splendid enterprise and daring.

He was a member of the Clinton Presbyterian Church, and Superintendent of the Sunday School there.

=== Political career ===
New Zealand Parliament
Years	Term	Electorate	Party
1935–1936	25th	Clutha	Independent
1936–1938	Changed allegiance to:		National
1938–1943	26th	Clutha	National
1943–1946	27th	Clutha	National
1946–1949	28th	Clutha	National
1949–1951	29th	Clutha	National
1951–1954	30th	Clutha	National
1954–1957	31st	Clutha	National
1958–1960	32nd	Clutha	National

At the 1935 election, he succeeded Peter McSkimming as an independent supporter of the Reform-United coalition in the Clutha electorate. In 1936, he joined the new National Party formed from a coalition of the Reform Party and the United Party plus three Independents (Roy, with James Hargest and William Polson). He held the Clutha electorate until 1960, when he retired.

In 1953, Roy was awarded the Queen Elizabeth II Coronation Medal.

=== Later life and death ===
Roy died in 1971. He was survived by his wife, daughter and son.

== Notes ==
New Zealand Parliament
Preceded by Peter McSkimming	Member of Parliament for Clutha; 1935–1960	Succeeded by Peter Gordon
