= Value of work done =

The value of work done (VOWD) is a project management technique for measuring and estimating the project cost at a point in time. It is mainly used in project environments of the Petroleum industry and is defined as the value of goods and services progressed, regardless of whether or not they have been paid for or received. The primary purpose of determining VOWD is to get an accurate and comprehensive as possible estimate of cost for a project at a point in time. This is used in overall project management including reporting and cost control.

== Introduction ==
Unlike the earned value, which measures the value of goods and services received as a percentage of the planned value, the VOWD is not measured against the plan, but against the committed cost. Committed costs can be derived from purchase orders, contracts, approved changes, change orders and other forms of commitments. From an earned value management point of view, the VOWD is comparable to the actual cost achieved rather than the earned value. VOWD represents the full value of the work that has been achieved, at a point in time, against the commercial criteria of the commitments for that work, regardless of payment or receipt.

The main methods of calculating VOWD are as follows:

=== VOWD for engineering, procurement and construction (EPC) services ===
VOWD of EPC (contract) services are measured in terms of actual physical progress based on the documentary evidence of the deliverable produced. The VOWD is determined by applying the percentage of physical progress achieved to the current committed value of the cost of that item, which is in general the contract or purchase order value, including any approved changes. For services specifically, incurred hours to a point in time can be used as a basis for progress, including hours recorded and those yet to be recorded for a specific point in time, as long as they were incurred to that point in time.

=== VOWD for tagged equipment ===
The VOWD for procuring tagged equipment is usually calculated based on a milestone deliverables basis as this type of equipment and its contractual milestones and VOWD are usually closely aligned.

Tagged equipment is any equipment that is one (or a few) of a kind specific to a project and type of equipment required for that project. It is not a commodity and specific for a particular task.

Examples of tagged equipment include; a pump, a motor, a drive, some electrical wire, a control cabinet, some specific instrumentation, a gauge, transformers. It is not bulk in nature.

Milestones examples may include; 10% on order execution, 20% on ________, 40% on __________, 10% on _________, 10% on ________________.

=== VOWD for procured regular bulk materials ===
The VOWD for procured bulk materials is usually calculated based on the quantities of materials delivered. The percent complete is calculated by dividing the quantity of material received at the site by the total quantity required for the project. The resulting percent is multiplied by the current agreed committed value of the material item to obtain the VOWD for that item.

Examples of regular bulk materials include;

–standard valves; such as small valves, with standard and published specifications, easily obtainable from alternative sources, comparable in nature, larger valves with the same characteristics also are regular bulk materials, more than one, a number in quantity, required for a number of applications and locations within/for a project

–standard pipe and tubing; same as above

–steel; same as above

If there are significant quantities with financial and commercial obligations for such items en route, prior to receipt of such goods, these quantities should be included in the VOWD percent complete calculation for regular bulk materials.

=== VOWD for procured non regular bulk materials ===
The VOWD for procured non regular bulk materials is usually calculated based on estimate of percent complete basis. The percent complete is calculated by dividing the quantity of material progressed at a point in time by the total quantity required for the project. The resulting percent is multiplied by the current agreed committed value of the material item to obtain the VOWD for that item. Adjustments, +/-, to the quantities should be made for other factors that affect the completion of the non regular bulk material.

Characteristics of non regular bulk materials are; higher or high quantity of materials, non routine, unusual, special order, non regular, special run, non standard in nature.

Examples of non regular bulk materials include; -Non regular valves - those that require unique or specialized specification, testing or manufacturing or similar, something that makes them non routine, high or higher volume in total quantity -Non regular pipes, tubes - those that require a special mill run, a large separate order of steel, special testing to meet specification or special manufacturing to meet project requirements, more than one in quantity, usually many -Steel - materials that require unique configuration, design, manufacturing and similar, much material, not simply one piece

Adjustments might include steel mill retooling upfront costs, specialized steps to manufacture, temper, role, test or certify the pipe going through the mill. There is value in these steps that needs to be incorporated into the VOWD determination. To get documentary evidence to support an estimate as to the value of these steps one might use the milestones as inputs, supplier reports, pictures, video, progress reports on KPI's, supplier surveillance, as well as interim costs of shipping, handling and transportation.

=== VOWD for procured major equipment ===
A. Weighted value basis One method for determining VOWD for major equipment is based on weighted values of items of equipment. At the outset of the project a list of equipment is prepared, and the weighted (%) value of each piece of equipment, with the sum of the weighted values of all items totaling 100%. When an item of equipment is received on site the percentage contribution of that equipment is added to the previous months weighted value of all other equipment to determine the total cumulative percentage value of equipment received on site. The VOWD of major equipment is calculated by multiplying the weighted percentage value of all equipment received at site by the total current approved contract value of the Major Equipment scope.

B. Percent Complete Basis When weighted values are not available or appropriate for determining VOWD, an alternative method would be percent complete basis.

The VOWD of major equipment is calculated by multiplying the weighted percentage value of all progress of the major equipment, at a point in time, by the total current approved contract value of the Major Equipment scope.

To get documentary evidence to support an estimate as to the value of these steps one might use the milestones as inputs, as well as supplier reports, pictures, video, progress reports on KPI's, supplier surveillance, as well as interim costs of shipping, handling and transportation. Key inputs into the equipment can also help determining progress, such as key quantities and steps and stages of construction.

Examples of major equipment include; an off shore platform, a vessel, a barge, a steam turbine generator, a large mine hopper, or similar.

=== VOWD for construction ===
For construction the physical percent complete of any element of the work is measured based on a physical measurement system (but not in terms of job-hours expended, as the measurement system needs to be fixed during the project duration).

Apply the same principles as in major equipment to determine the VOWD for construction.

Examples of construction include; a building, a manufacturing plant, a complex, multifaceted industrial equipment or facility.

=== What VOWD is not ===
VOWD is not solely based on goods and services receipts. VOWD is not solely based on cash and or invoice payments. VOWD is not simply a milestone based costing valuation. These components are referenced in determining VOWD, however VOWD is a more fulsome valuation determination of the full value of goods and services committed to and obligated to, at a point in time. Regardless of whether they have been paid for or have been completely received.
