= James Allen (New Zealand politician) =

New Zealand politician and diplomat (1855–1942)

The Honourable Sir James Allen GCMG KCB VD
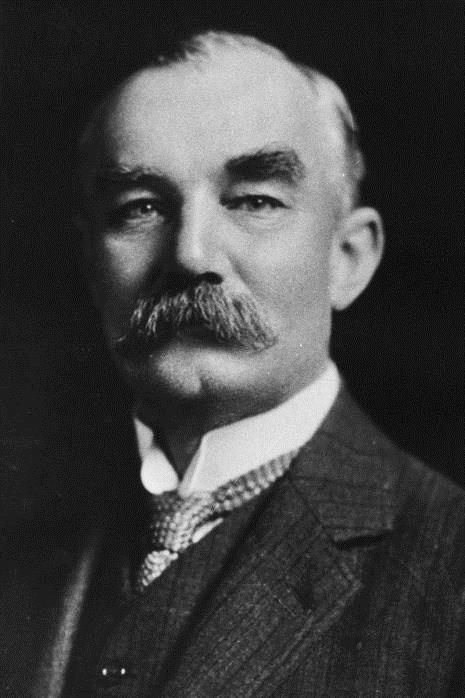

1st Minister of Foreign Affairs
- In office 24 November 1919 – 28 April 1920
- Prime Minister: William Massey
- Succeeded by: Ernest Lee

21st Minister of Finance
- In office 4 September 1919 – 28 April 1920
- Prime Minister: William Massey
- Preceded by: Sir Joseph Ward
- Succeeded by: William Massey
- In office 10 July 1912 – 12 August 1915
- Prime Minister: William Massey
- Preceded by: Arthur Myers
- Succeeded by: Sir Joseph Ward

13th Minister of Defence
- In office 10 July 1912 – 28 April 1920
- Prime Minister: William Massey
- Preceded by: Arthur Myers
- Succeeded by: Heaton Rhodes

Member of the New Zealand Parliament for Bruce
- In office 4 May 1892 – 14 April 1920
- Preceded by: James Thomson
- Succeeded by: John Edie

Personal details
- Born: 10 February 1855 Adelaide, Australia.
- Died: 28 July 1942 (aged 87) Dunedin New Zealand
- Party: Reform Party
- Relations: Charles Richards Allen
- Occupation: Politician

Sir James Allen GCMG KCB VD (10 February 1855 – 28 July 1942) was a prominent New Zealand politician and diplomat. He held a number of the most important political offices in the country, including Minister of Finance and Minister of Foreign Affairs. He was also New Zealand's Minister of Defence during World War I.

== Early life ==
Allen was born in Adelaide, Australia. Some time after his brother Charles was born (1856) and their before their mother's early death in 1861, the young family moved to Dunedin, New Zealand, where the family resided for several years. Shortly after his mother's death, Allen and his brother Charles were given into the care of an uncle in Shepton Mallet, Somerset, England. Allen's father died in 1865, leaving him an orphan.

Despite this rather turbulent beginning to his life, Allen made a good start. After first attending Clifton College in Bristol (having won a scholarship to do so), he gained admittance to St John's College at Cambridge University. He graduated with a BA in 1877. Allan married Mary Jane Hill Richards on 23 August 1877 at Evercreech, Summerset, UK. In 1878, Allen, Mary Jane, and Charles all returned to Dunedin, where he and his brother had inherited a significant amount of property from their father.

In Dunedin, Allen was highly successful, serving on the City Council and even playing for the Otago provincial rugby team. He left for England once again in 1883, studying at the Royal School of Mines for several years. When he returned to Dunedin, he established a presence in Otago's coal and gold mining industries.

== Early parliamentary career ==
New Zealand Parliament
Years	Term	Electorate	Party
1887–1890	10th	Dunedin East	Independent
1892–1893	11th	Bruce	Independent
1893–1896	12th	Bruce	Independent
1896–1899	13th	Bruce	Independent
1899–1902	14th	Bruce	Independent
1902–1905	15th	Bruce	Independent
1905–1908	16th	Bruce	Independent
1908–1909	17th	Bruce	Independent
1909–1911	Changed allegiance to:		Reform
1911–1914	18th	Bruce	Reform
1914–1919	19th	Bruce	Reform
1919–1920	20th	Bruce	Reform

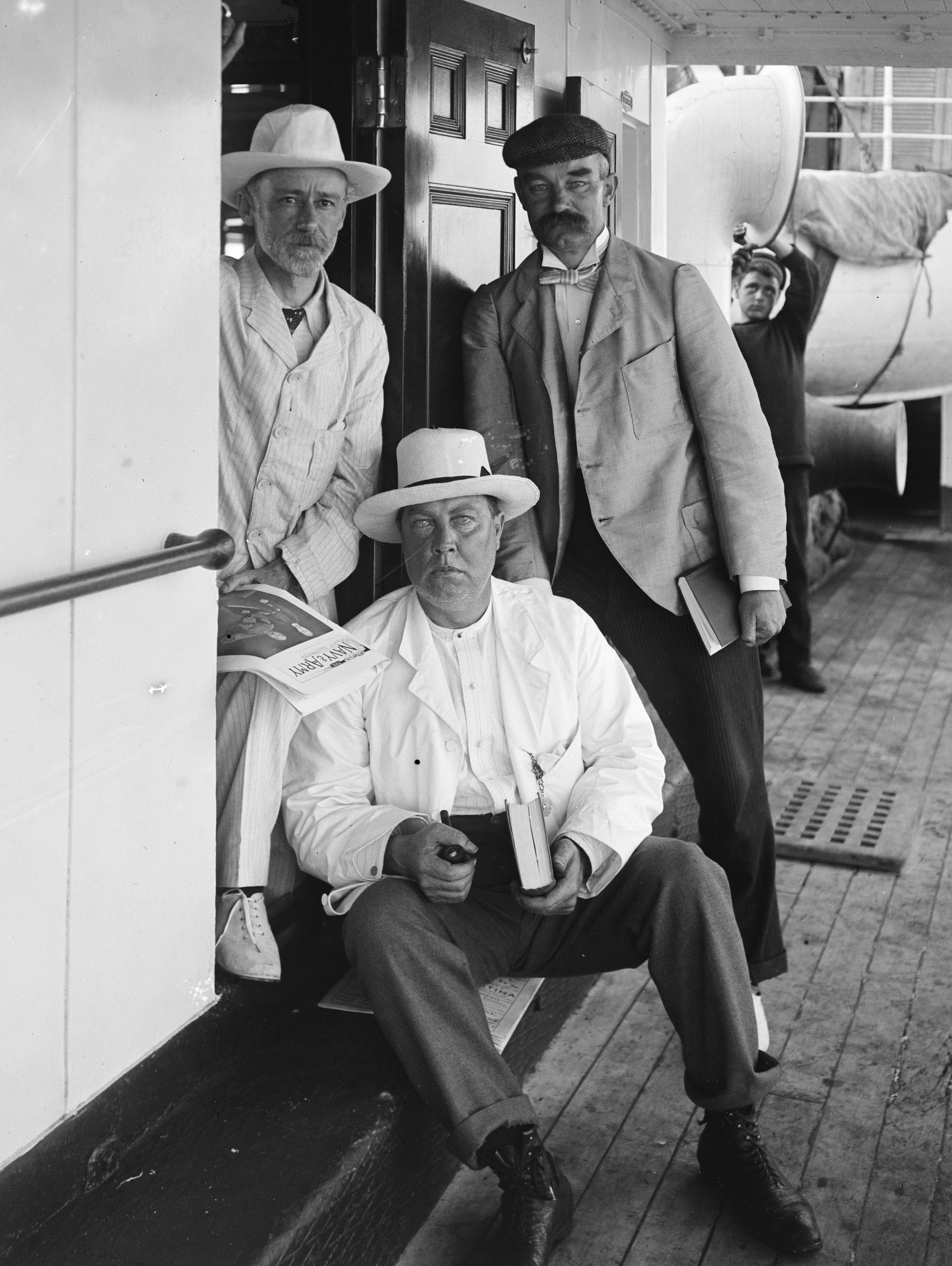
Walter Carncross, William Thomas Wood and Allen (right) during the Parliamentary Excursion to South Sea Islands, 1903

In 1887, Allen decided to enter national politics, standing in the Dunedin East seat as a conservative opponent to Robert Stout, the Premier. Few expected a first-time challenger to defeat the Premier, but amazingly, Allen did just that. Allen's own tenure as MP for Dunedin East was short, however, as he was himself voted out of office at the next (1890) election. In 1892, however, Allen returned to Parliament after winning a by-election in the rural Otago electorate of Bruce, which he held until he retired in 1920.

Gradually, Allen developed a reputation as a solid performer in Parliament. He lacked the skills at oratory of some of his contemporaries, and was often seen as humourless and uncharismatic. But he was nevertheless considered dependable, reasonable, and practical. He was sometimes cited as a possible leader for Parliament's conservative faction, but when the conservatives eventually came together to found the Reform Party, the more charismatic William Massey became leader instead.

== Ministerial career ==
When Reform won the 1911 election, Massey became Prime Minister and Allen was elevated to Cabinet. His primary responsibilities were finance, education, and defence in the Reform Government, and he was very active in all three portfolios. As Minister of Finance, he attempted (with only a limited degree of success) to curtail the spending of the outgoing Premier, Joseph Ward, believing strongly in the need to reduce New Zealand's overseas borrowing. As Minister of Education, he was responsible for legislation that guaranteed statutory funding for universities. As Minister of Defence, he encouraged New Zealand's development of naval and air capabilities independent of the United Kingdom, and worked to improve the quality of compulsory military training. He also reversed the previous government's policy of opposing close defence co-operation with Australia.

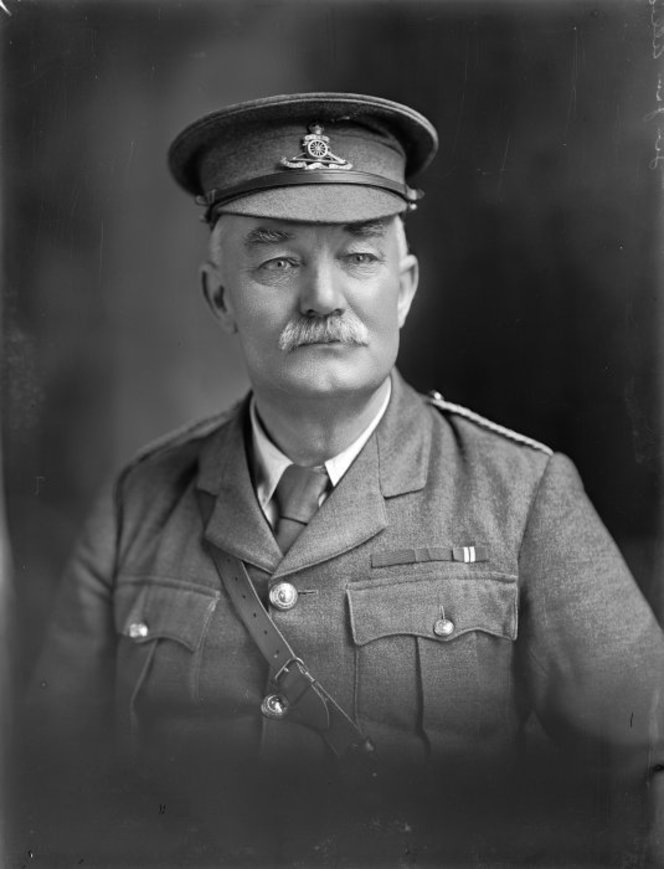
Allen in military attire during WWI.

In World War I, Allen was a major figure in New Zealand's war effort, playing a very significant organisational role. His reforms of the military training programme were widely credited with allowing a rapid deployment of New Zealand forces, including the forces which invaded and occupied Samoa (then a territory of Germany). In August 1915, a war-time coalition government was formed, and Allen lost his finance and education roles to members of the erstwhile Opposition, but he continued to play a significant role. Towards the end of the war, when both Massey (the Prime Minister) and Ward (the Leader of the Opposition) travelled overseas for meetings and conferences, Allen was Acting Prime Minister - in total, he spent nearly two years in this role. The stress of his many responsibilities during the war was considerable, and was only worsened when his son was killed in the ill-fated landing at Gallipoli. Allen was appointed an Officer of the Legion of Honour in February 1922 when he was High Commissioner in London.

== Subsequent activities ==
After the war, the coalition government collapsed, and James Allen once again became Minister of Finance. In October 1919, he was made the first Minister of External Affairs, a new ministerial portfolio that was created to administer New Zealand's newly acquired League of Nations Mandate Samoa. He took up these posts reluctantly, describing himself as weary of politics. In 1920, he resigned from Parliament to take up a position as New Zealand's High Commissioner to the United Kingdom. He also represented New Zealand at the League of Nations, taking a prominent part in the League's Permanent Mandates Commission.

After returning to New Zealand, Allen became active in a number of organisations. Reflecting his long-held interest in the Pacific Islands, which had been stimulated by a number of visits in the course of his political career, he was a prominent member of the Institute of Pacific Relations, whose New Zealand branch he chaired from its formation in 1926 until late 1937. He was active in All Saints' Church, Dunedin and also vice-president of the Bible-in-Schools League, reflecting a cause which he had controversially championed while Minister of Education.

On 1 June 1927, Allen was appointed to the Legislative Council, the (now-abolished) upper house of Parliament. The Legislative Council was considerably more sedate than the lower house, and Allen was not overly stressed by its activities. At the end of his first term in 1934, he was reappointed (until 1941).

Allen retired from public life in 1938, and died in Dunedin on 28 July 1942.

== Honours and awards ==
Allen was appointed a Knight Commander of the Order of the Bath in the 1917 New Year Honours, and a Knight Grand Cross of the Order of St Michael and St George in the 1926 New Year Honours. He was awarded the King George V Silver Jubilee Medal in 1935.

== Notes ==
New Zealand Parliament
Preceded by Robert Stout	Member of Parliament for Dunedin East; 1887–1890	Constituency abolished
Preceded by James William Thomson	Member of Parliament for Bruce; 1892–1920	Succeeded by John Edie
Political offices
Preceded by Josiah Hanan	Minister of Education; 1912–1915	Succeeded by Josiah Hanan
Preceded by Arthur Myers	Minister of Defence; 1912–1920	Succeeded by Heaton Rhodes
Preceded by Arthur Myers	Minister of Finance; 1912–1915 1919-1920	Succeeded by Sir Joseph Ward
Preceded by Sir Joseph Ward	Minister of Finance; 1912–1915 1919-1920	Succeeded by William Massey
New title	Minister of Foreign Affairs; 1919–1920	Succeeded by Ernest Lee
Diplomatic posts
Preceded by Thomas Mackenzie	High Commissioner of New Zealand to the United Kingdom; 1920–1926	Succeeded by James Parr
