= James William Thomson =

New Zealand politician

James William Thomson (1828 – 4 August 1907) was a 19th-century conservative Member of Parliament in New Zealand.

== Early life ==
Thomson was born in Auchterarder, Scotland, in 1828. He obtained his education at the University of Edinburgh, where he obtained an MA. He came to New Zealand in 1859 and settled in Balclutha.

== Political career ==
=== Provincial Council ===
He was elected onto the Otago Provincial Council for the Clutha electorate in October 1864. He remained on the Provincial Council until May 1873. For two days in May 1868, he was a member of the Otago Executive Council. He was a provincialist.

=== Member of Parliament ===
New Zealand Parliament
Years	Term	Electorate	Party
1871–1875	5th	Clutha	Independent
1876–1879	6th	Clutha	Independent
1879–1881	7th	Clutha	Independent
1881–1884	8th	Clutha	Independent
1884–1887	9th	Clutha	Independent
1890–1892	11th	Bruce	Independent
1896–1899	13th	Clutha	Independent
1899–1902	14th	Clutha	Independent
1902–1905	15th	Clutha	Independent

Thomson represented the Clutha electorate from 1871 to 1887 when he was defeated. He then represented Bruce from 1890 to 1892, when he resigned. He did not stand for election in the 1893 election. Finally he represented the Clutha electorate again from 1896 to 1905, when he retired.

=== Minister ===
Thomson was for three months in 1879 Minister of Lands in the Grey Ministry.

== Notes ==
New Zealand Parliament
Preceded by James Macandrew	Member of Parliament for Clutha; 1871–1887; 1896–1905	Succeeded by Thomas Mackenzie
Preceded by Thomas Mackenzie	Member of Parliament for Clutha; 1871–1887; 1896–1905	Succeeded by Alexander Malcolm
Preceded by Crawford Anderson	Member of Parliament for Bruce; 1890–1892	Succeeded by James Allen
