= Charles Broad =

Charles Broad may refer to:

- Charles Broad (British Army officer) (1882–1976), British Army general
- Charles Broad (magistrate) (1828–1879), New Zealand goldfields administrator and magistrate
- Charles Harrington Broad (1872–1959), New Zealand cricketer and school teacher
- Charles Broad (Canterbury cricketer) (1945–2019), New Zealand cricketer
- C. D. Broad (Charlie Dunbar Broad, 1887–1971), English epistemologist, philosopher and writer
