= Edward Broad =

Personal information
- Full name: Edward William Broad
- Born: 30 April 1875; Nelson, New Zealand
- Died: 17 April 1913 (aged 37); Marton, Manawatu, New Zealand
- Role: Wicket-keeper
- Relatives: Charles H Broad (brother); Charles Broad (uncle); Henry Bunny (grandfather)

Domestic team information
- Years: Team
- 1891/92: Nelson

Career statistics
Competition	First-class
Matches	1
Runs scored	13
Batting average	13.00
100s/50s	0/0
Top score	13
Catches/stumpings	4/0
- Source: Cricinfo, 17 February 2013

Edward William Broad (30 April 1875 – 17 April 1913) was a New Zealand cricketer. Broad's batting style is unknown, though it is known he played as a wicket-keeper. He was born at Nelson, New Zealand.

Broad was educated at Nelson College from 1886 to 1892. He made a single first-class appearance for Nelson against Wellington at Trafalgar Park in December 1891. Broad ended Nelson's first-innings of 106 all out unbeaten on 0, while in Wellington's first-innings of 128 all out he took three catches. In Nelson's second-innings of 111 all out, he scored 13 runs before he was dismissed by William Ogier. In Wellington's one wicket victory, he also claimed a single catch in their second-innings chase.

He was struck by a train while riding his motor cycle across a level crossing at Marton, Manawatu, on 16 April 1913, and died of his injuries at Marton the next day. He left a widow, four sons and a daughter.
