= Wairarapa (electorate) =

- Single-member general constituency for the New Zealand House of Representatives
- Interactive map of boundaries from the 2026 election
- Formation: 1859
- Region: Hawke's Bay, Manawatū-Whanganui and Wellington
- Character: Rural
- Term: 3 years

Member for Wairarapa
- TBD
- List MPs: Kieran McAnulty (Labour); Celia Wade-Brown (Green)
- Previous MP: Kieran McAnulty (Labour)
Party vote distribution

Wairarapa is a New Zealand parliamentary electorate. It was first created in 1858 (with the first election in 1859) and existed until 1881. It was recreated in 1887 and has since existed continuously. The current Wairarapa electorate MP is Mike Butterick, who based on preliminary results has been reconfirmed in the 2026 general election, but the result may change with the final vote count expected for 27 November.

== Population centres ==
The initial 24 New Zealand electorates were defined by Governor George Grey in March 1853, based on the New Zealand Constitution Act 1852 that had been passed by the British government. The Constitution Act also allowed the House of Representatives to establish new electorates, and this was first done in 1858, when four new electorates were formed by splitting existing electorates. Wairarapa was one of those four electorates, and it was established by splitting the Wairarapa and Hawke's Bay electorate, and incorporating areas that previously did not belong to any electorate. Settlements in the initial area were Featherston, Carterton, Eketāhuna, and Pahiatua. For the 1860 election, there were 266 voters registered.In the early years, the electorate was for a time represented by two members.

In the 1887 electoral redistribution, although the Representation Commission was required through the Representation Act 1887 to maintain existing electorates "as far as possible", rapid population growth in the North Island required the transfer of three seats from the South Island to the north. Ten new electorates were created, and one former electorate, Wairarapa, was recreated.

The electorate boundaries were last adjusted in the 2007 redistribution. No boundary adjustments were undertaken in the subsequent 2013/14 or 2019/20 redistributions.

Map of boundaries at the 2020 and 2023 general elections

During the 2019/20 boundary review done by the Electoral Commission, Kieran McAnulty, a List MP based in the electorate, and Central Hawke's Bay Mayor Alex Walker, proposed that the electorate be renamed to Wairarapa and Central Hawke's Bay in order to acknowledge the communities included in the electorate. Ultimately the commission decided against changing the name.

During the 2025 boundary review done by the Electoral Commission, the electorate would gain Ashhurst in the Manawatū-Whanganui region. The current electorate includes the following population centres (approximate population in brackets) from the Wairarapa area of the Wellington region, the Tararua District and part of Palmerston North City (part of the Manawatū-Whanganui region) and the Central Hawke's Bay District (part of the Hawke's Bay region):

- Masterton (22,600)
- Carterton (5,930)
- Featherston (2,870)
- Greytown (2,840)
- Martinborough (1,900)
- Dannevirke (5,640)
- Pahiatua (2,830)
- Woodville (1,680)
- Ashhurst (3,350)
- Waipukurau (4,750)
- Waipawa (2,430)

== History ==
The first election was held on 7 November 1859, and Charles Carter was the first representative until 1865, when he resigned. He was succeeded by Henry Bunny from 1865 to 1881. Since 1871, the electorate had two representatives, and the second one was John Chapman Andrew until he resigned in 1877, succeeded by George Beetham from 1877 to 1881.

From 1881 to 1887 Wairarapa was replaced by two electorates; Wairarapa North and Wairarapa South. From 1887, they were replaced by the Masterton and Wairarapa electorates.

Between 1899 and 1919 the Wairarapa electorate swung between Wally Buchanan the Conservative then Reform candidate and J. T. Marryat Hornsby the Liberal candidate, changing hands in 1902, 1905, 1908 and 1914. Buchanan's support was in the rural areas, and Hornsby's was in the small towns.

From 1919 to 1928 the electorate was represented by Alex McLeod for Reform. In 1928 he was defeated by Thomas William McDonald the United (Liberal) candidate, but in 1931 McLeod won the seat back.

Ben Roberts represented the electorate for the Labour Party from the 1935 election until 1946, when he retired. In the 1943 election, Roberts was unsuccessfully challenged by National's Jimmy Maher.

In the 1987 election, Reg Boorman won the initial count by one vote, but Wyatt Creech later challenged that result on the grounds that Boorman had violated new laws about election spending. Creech also challenged more than 200 votes (on various grounds). The Electoral Court upheld Creech's petition, and Creech won the seat in 1988 with a majority of 34 votes (9994 to 9960).

Creech held the Wairarapa electorate for four parliamentary terms. In December 1997, he became Deputy Leader of the National Party. That gave him number two on the National party list, and he did not contest an electorate in the 1999 election. The National Party stood Paul Henry in the election, but to the general surprise of political commentators, the typically right-leaning electorate was won by Labour's Georgina Beyer with a 3,033 vote majority to become the world's first transsexual member of parliament. At the 2002 election, Beyer was easily re-elected with an increased majority of 6,372 votes. Beyer stood in the 2005 election as a list-only candidate, and the Wairarapa electorate was won by John Hayes of the National Party.

Hayes held the electorate for three parliamentary terms and retired at the 2014 election, when he was succeeded by National's Alastair Scott. Scott retired at the 2020 election. The seat was won by Kieran McAnulty in a surprise Labour Party swing, with new National candidate Mike Butterick taking second place. Mike Butterick won the seat at the 2023 election and is the current Wairarapa MP. McAnulty returned to Parliament via the Labour Party list. In the 2026 general election, Butterick won the electorate based on preliminary results, but The New Zealand Herald considers this as one of five electorates where the result may change with the final vote count expected for 27 November. Kieran McAnulty of the Labour Party is a close second, trailing with 139 votes.

=== Members of Parliament ===
Key

Independent Conservative Liberal Reform United Labour National NZ First

==== Single-member electorate ====
Election	Winner
1859 election	Charles Carter
1860 election	Charles Carter
1865 by-election	Henry Bunny
1866 election	Henry Bunny

==== Multi-member electorate ====
Election	Winner	
1871 election	Henry Bunny	John Chapman Andrew
1876 election	Henry Bunny	John Chapman Andrew
1877 by-election	Henry Bunny	George Beetham
1879 election	Henry Bunny	George Beetham

==== Single-member electorate ====
Election	Winner
1887 election	Wally Buchanan
1890 election	Wally Buchanan
1893 election	Wally Buchanan
1896 election	Wally Buchanan
1899 election	J. T. Marryat Hornsby
1902 election	Wally Buchanan
1905 election	J. T. Marryat Hornsby
1908 election	Wally Buchanan
1911 election	Wally Buchanan
1914 election	J. T. Marryat Hornsby
1919 election	Alex McLeod
1922 election	Alex McLeod
1925 election	Alex McLeod
1928 election	Thomas McDonald
1931 election	Alex McLeod
1935 election	Ben Roberts
1938 election	Ben Roberts
1943 election	Ben Roberts
1946 election	Garnet Mackley
1949 election	Bert Cooksley
1951 election	Bert Cooksley
1954 election	Bert Cooksley
1957 election	Bert Cooksley
1960 election	Bert Cooksley
1963 election	Haddon Donald
1966 election	Haddon Donald
1969 election	Jack Williams
1972 election	Jack Williams
1975 election	Ben Couch
1978 election	Ben Couch
1981 election	Ben Couch
1984 election	Reg Boorman
1987 election	Reg Boorman
1988 (Note: The election of Reg Boorman was overturned by the Electoral Court on 12 July 1988)	Wyatt Creech
1990 election	Wyatt Creech
1993 election	Wyatt Creech
1996 election	Wyatt Creech
1999 election	Georgina Beyer
2002 election	Georgina Beyer
2005 election	John Hayes
2008 election	John Hayes
2011 election	John Hayes
2014 election	Alastair Scott
2017 election	Alastair Scott
2020 election	Kieran McAnulty
2023 election	Mike Butterick (provisional for 2026)
2026 election	Mike Butterick (provisional for 2026)

=== List MPs ===
Members of Parliament elected from party lists in elections where that person also unsuccessfully contested the Wairarapa electorate. Unless otherwise stated, all MPs terms began and ended at general elections.

Election	Winner
2002 election	Edwin Perry
2014 election	Ron Mark
2017 election	Ron Mark
2017 election	Kieran McAnulty
2023 election	Kieran McAnulty
2024 (Note: Entered Parliament following the resignation of Green Party MP Golriz Ghahraman on 16 January 2024)	Celia Wade-Brown
2026 election	Kieran McAnulty (provisional)

== Election results ==
=== 2026 election ===
The next election will be held on 7 November 2026. Candidates for Wairarapa are listed at Candidates in the 2026 New Zealand general election by electorate § Wairarapa. Official results will be available after 27 November 2026.

=== 2023 election ===
2023 general election: Wairarapa
Notes:	Blue background denotes the winner of the electorate vote. Pink background denotes a candidate elected from their party list. Yellow background denotes an electorate win by a list member, or other incumbent. A ✓ or ✗ denotes status of any incumbent, win or lose respectively.						
Party	Candidate	Votes	%	±%	Party votes	%	±%
National	Mike Butterick	20,313	46.11	+11.69	17,397	38.94	+9.86
Labour	✗ Kieran McAnulty	17,497	39.72	−9.23	12,223	27.36	−20.52
ACT	Simon Casey	1,907	4.32	+1.94	4,752	10.63	+1.50
Green	Celia Wade-Brown	1,832	4.15	+1.14	3,676	8.22	+3.08
NZ Loyal	Pete Arnott	1,737	3.94	+3.94	1,027	2.29	+2.29
Te Pāti Māori	Te Whakapono Waikare	517	1.17	+1.17	455	1.01	+0.74
Independent	Jared Gardner	247	0.56	+0.56			
NZ First					3,655	8.18	+4.77
Opportunities					708	1.58	+0.50
Legalise Cannabis					207	0.46	+0.10
NewZeal					156	0.30	+0.30
Freedoms NZ					93	0.21	+0.21
Animal Justice					81	0.18	+0.18
DemocracyNZ					72	0.16	+0.16
New Conservatives					58	0.13	−1.35
Women's Rights					47	0.11	+0.11
Leighton Baker Party					35	0.08	+0.08
Informal votes		457			199		
Total valid votes		44,507			44,873		
National gain from Labour	Majority	2,816	6.39				

=== 2020 election ===
2020 general election: Wairarapa
Notes:	Blue background denotes the winner of the electorate vote. Pink background denotes a candidate elected from their party list. Yellow background denotes an electorate win by a list member, or other incumbent. A ✓ or ✗ denotes status of any incumbent, win or lose respectively.						
Party	Candidate	Votes	%	±%	Party votes	%	±%
Labour	Kieran McAnulty	22,042	48.95	+14.75	21,673	47.88	+15.80
National	Mike Butterick	15,497	34.42	−6.69	13,165	29.08	−19.72
NZ First	Ron Mark	3,278	7.28	−12.16	1,545	3.41	−6.92
Green	Celia Wade-Brown	1,359	3.01	−1.21	2,329	5.14	+0.32
ACT	Roger Greenslade	1,076	2.38	+2.05	4,136	9.13	+8.73
New Conservative	Warren Butterworth	587	1.30	–	670	1.48	+1.27
Advance NZ	Nigel Anthony Gray	443	0.98	–	464	1.02	–
Independent	Aileen Haeata	109	0.24	–			
Opportunities					490	1.08	−0.95
Legalise Cannabis					167	0.36	−0.01
ONE					137	0.30	–
Māori Party					125	0.27	−0.25
Outdoors					50	0.11	+0.04
Vision NZ					12	0.02	–
Social Credit					9	0.02	+0.01
Sustainable NZ					9	0.02	–
TEA					5	0.01	–
Heartland					5	0.01	–
Informal votes		636			279		
Total valid votes		45,027			45,264		
Turnout		45,264					
Labour gain from National	Majority	6,545	14.53	+7.15			

=== 2017 election ===
2017 general election: Wairarapa
Notes:	Blue background denotes the winner of the electorate vote. Pink background denotes a candidate elected from their party list. Yellow background denotes an electorate win by a list member, or other incumbent. A ✓ or ✗ denotes status of any incumbent, win or lose respectively.						
Party	Candidate	Votes	%	±%	Party votes	%	±%
National	✓ Alastair Scott	16,514	41.40	−2.20	19,750	48.80	−3.51
Labour	Kieran McAnulty	13,642	34.20	+8.79	12,984	32.08	11.52
NZ First	Ron Mark	7,753	19.44	−3.76	4,180	10.33	−0.84
Green	John Hart	1,683	4.22	0.01	1,950	4.82	−3.53
Independent	James Harold	164	0.41	—			
ACT	Roger Greenslade	130	0.33	0.09	162	0.40	0.07
Opportunities					821	2.03	—
Māori Party					209	0.52	−0.05
Legalise Cannabis					150	0.37	−0.10
Conservative					86	0.21	−4.11
Ban 1080					81	0.20	−0.18
Outdoors					29	0.07	—
United Future					20	0.05	−0.11
People's Party					24	0.06	—
Democrats					8	0.01	0.00
Mana Party					8	0.02	−0.42 (Note: 2017 Mana Party swing is relative to the votes for Internet-Mana in 2014; it shared a party list with the Internet Party in the 2014 election)
Internet					6	0.01	−0.43 (Note: 2017 Internet Party swing is relative to the votes for Internet-Mana in 2014; it shared a party list with Mana Party in the 2014 election)
Informal votes		346			134		
Total valid votes		39,886			40,468		
Turnout		40,602					
National hold	Majority	2,872	7.20	−11.00			

=== 2014 election ===
2014 general election: Wairarapa
Notes:	Blue background denotes the winner of the electorate vote. Pink background denotes a candidate elected from their party list. Yellow background denotes an electorate win by a list member, or other incumbent. A ✓ or ✗ denotes status of any incumbent, win or lose respectively.						
Party	Candidate	Votes	%	±%	Party votes	%	±%
National	Alastair Scott	16,223	43.61	−9.05	19,634	52.32	+0.79
Labour	Kieran McAnulty	9,452	25.41	−6.23	7,712	20.55	−2.74
NZ First	Ron Mark	8,630	23.20	+23.20	4,393	11.17	+3.35
Green	John Hart	1,566	4.21	−4.20	3,134	8.35	−1.48
Conservative	Brent Reid	816	2.19	−2.16	1,622	4.32	+0.57
Māori Party	Ra Smith	181	0.49	+0.49	209	0.57	−0.05
ACT	Shane Atkinson	90	0.24	−0.80	124	0.33	−1.00
Legalise Cannabis					175	0.47	−0.10
Internet Mana					164	0.44	+0.23
Ban 1080					142	0.38	+0.38
United Future					59	0.16	−0.52
Civilian					22	0.06	+0.06
Independent Coalition					8	0.02	+0.02
Democrats					7	0.02	−0.02
Focus					4	0.01	+0.01
Informal votes		246			116		
Total valid votes		37,204			37,525		
National hold	Majority	6,771	18.20	−3.19			

=== 2011 election ===
2011 general election: Wairarapa
Notes:	Blue background denotes the winner of the electorate vote. Pink background denotes a candidate elected from their party list. Yellow background denotes an electorate win by a list member, or other incumbent. A ✓ or ✗ denotes status of any incumbent, win or lose respectively.						
Party	Candidate	Votes	%	±%	Party votes	%	±%
National	✓ John Hayes	17,881	52.65	+1.63	18,046	51.53	+2.87
Labour	Michael Bott	10,746	31.64	−0.77	8,161	23.30	−7.93
Green	Sea Rotmann	2,856	8.41	+3.24	3,442	9.83	+4.08
Conservative	Brent Reid	1,476	4.35	+4.35	1,314	3.75	+3.75
Libertarianz	Richard McGrath	652	1.92	+0.67	94	0.27	+0.10
ACT	Shane Atkinson	352	1.04	−0.95	467	1.33	−3.19
NZ First					2,738	7.82	+2.26
United Future					238	0.68	+0.004
Māori Party					218	0.62	−0.10
Legalise Cannabis					200	0.57	+0.24
Mana					75	0.21	+0.21
Alliance					14	0.04	−0.09
Democrats					14	0.04	+0.02
Informal votes		1,116			294		
Total valid votes		33,963			35,021		
National hold	Majority	7,135	21.01	+2.40			

Electorate (as at 26 November 2011): 46,425

=== 2008 election ===
2008 general election: Wairarapa
Notes:	Blue background denotes the winner of the electorate vote. Pink background denotes a candidate elected from their party list. Yellow background denotes an electorate win by a list member, or other incumbent. A ✓ or ✗ denotes status of any incumbent, win or lose respectively.						
Party	Candidate	Votes	%	±%	Party votes	%	±%
National	✓ John Hayes	18,524	51.02	+8.31	17,860	48.66	+3.54
Labour	Denise MacKenzie	11,766	32.41	−1.71	11,464	31.23	−4.83
NZ First	Edwin Perry	2,646	7.29	−9.28	2,040	5.56	−3.37
Green	Michael Woodcock	1,878	5.17	+1.61	2,109	5.75	+1.18
ACT	Shane Atkinson	721	1.99	+1.01	1,660	4.52	+3.38
Libertarianz	Richard McGrath	453	1.25	+1.25	61	0.17	+0.13
United Future	Graeme Reeves	219	0.60	−0.54	248	0.68	−1.33
Alliance	Amy Tubman	101	0.28	+0.28	47	0.13	+0.04
Bill and Ben					281	0.77	+0.77
Māori Party					266	0.72	+0.21
Progressive					251	0.68	−0.13
Kiwi					173	0.47	+0.47
Legalise Cannabis					122	0.33	+0.10
Family Party					80	0.22	+0.22
Workers Party					14	0.04	+0.04
Pacific					12	0.03	+0.03
Democrats					9	0.02	0.00
RAM					5	0.01	+0.01
RONZ					2	0.01	−0.01
Informal votes		298			131		
Total valid votes		36,308			36,704		
National hold	Majority	6,758	18.61	+10.02			

=== 2005 election ===
2005 general election: Wairarapa
Notes:	Blue background denotes the winner of the electorate vote. Pink background denotes a candidate elected from their party list. Yellow background denotes an electorate win by a list member, or other incumbent. A ✓ or ✗ denotes status of any incumbent, win or lose respectively.						
Party	Candidate	Votes	%	±%	Party votes	%	±%
National	John Hayes	13,681	42.71	+19.43	14,599	45.12	+20.39
Labour	Denise MacKenzie	10,929	34.12	−9.77	11,669	36.06	−2.16
NZ First	Edwin Perry	5,308	16.57	+11.55	2,889	8.93	−2.68
Green	Claire Bleakley	1,141	3.56	−0.78	1,478	4.57	−1.31
United Future	Graeme Reeves	364	1.14	−0.86	651	2.01	−3.58
ACT	Graeme Tulloch	314	0.98	−1.04	370	1.14	−4.56
Māori Party	Cissie Walker	293	0.91	+0.91	165	0.51	+0.51
Progressive					261	0.81	−0.79
Destiny					82	0.25	+0.25
Legalise Cannabis					76	0.23	−0.34
Christian Heritage					40	0.12	−2.75
Alliance					29	0.09	−0.91
Libertarianz					13	0.04	+0.04
Democrats					8	0.02	+0.02
Family Rights					6	0.02	+0.02
One NZ					6	0.02	−0.08
RONZ					6	0.02	+0.02
99 MP					5	0.02	+0.02
Direct Democracy					4	0.01	+0.01
Informal votes		243			124		
Total valid votes		32,030			32,357		
National gain from Labour	Majority	2,752	8.59	−12.01			

=== 2002 election ===
2002 general election: Wairarapa
Notes:	Blue background denotes the winner of the electorate vote. Pink background denotes a candidate elected from their party list. Yellow background denotes an electorate win by a list member, or other incumbent. A ✓ or ✗ denotes status of any incumbent, win or lose respectively.						
Party	Candidate	Votes	%	±%	Party votes	%	±%
Labour	✓ Georgina Beyer	13,572	43.89	−2.32	11,867	38.22	+1.91
National	Ian Buchanan	7,200	23.28	−13.61	7,678	24.73	−6.53
Christian Heritage	Merepeka Raukawa-Tait	5,852	18.92	+17.07	891	2.87	+0.13
NZ First	Edwin Perry	1,552	5.02	+2.52	3,605	11.61	+7.30
Green	Sarah Millington	861	2.78	+0.55	1,827	5.88	+1.28
ACT	Ian MacFarlane	625	2.02	−0.02	1,770	5.70	−1.48
United Future	Frank Owen	617	2.00	+1.39	1,735	5.59	+4.30
Progressive	Bill Henderson	223	0.72	–	498	1.60	–
Alliance	Gerald Tait	159	0.51	−7.02	311	1.00	−9.05
ORNZ					525	1.69	–
Legalise Cannabis					178	0.57	−0.58
One NZ					32	0.10	−0.06
Mana Māori					5	0.02	+0.01
NMP					3	0.01	Steady
Informal votes		264			121		
Total valid votes		30,925			31,046		
Labour hold	Majority	6,372	20.60	+11.28			

=== 1999 election ===
1999 general election: Wairarapa
Notes:	Blue background denotes the winner of the electorate vote. Pink background denotes a candidate elected from their party list. Yellow background denotes an electorate win by a list member, or other incumbent. A ✓ or ✗ denotes status of any incumbent, win or lose respectively.						
Party	Candidate	Votes	%	±%	Party votes	%	±%
Labour	Georgina Beyer	15,040	46.21	+32.12	11,897	36.31	+12.38
National	Paul Henry	12,006	36.89	−8.27	10,242	31.26	−1.55
Alliance	Cathy Casey	2,451	7.53	−13.14	3,294	10.05	−3.64
NZ First	Rob Harris	813	2.50	−11.57	1,413	4.31	−11.45
Green	Laurence Boomert	725	2.23	–	1,506	4.60	–
ACT	Paul Booth	663	2.04	−0.27	2,352	7.18	+0.74
Christian Heritage	Mike Lloyd	602	1.85	−0.38	898	2.74	−1.26
Christian Democrats	John Allen	197	0.61	–	273	0.83	–
Natural Law	Ian Douglas	47	0.14	−0.02	29	0.09	−0.19
Legalise Cannabis					378	1.15	−0.36
Libertarianz					185	0.56	+0.54
United NZ					152	0.46	−0.15
McGillicuddy Serious					59	0.18	−0.11
Animals First					43	0.13	Steady
One NZ					15	0.16	–
Republican					9	0.03	+0.03
Mauri Pacific					6	0.01	–
Mana Māori					4	0.01	−0.02
People's Choice Party					3	0.01	–
NMP					2	0.01	–
South Island					2	0.01	–
Informal votes		557			337		
Total valid votes		32,545			32,765		
Labour gain from National	Majority	3,033	9.32	−15.17			

=== 1996 election ===
1996 general election: Wairarapa
Notes:	Blue background denotes the winner of the electorate vote. Pink background denotes a candidate elected from their party list. Yellow background denotes an electorate win by a list member, or other incumbent. A ✓ or ✗ denotes status of any incumbent, win or lose respectively.						
Party	Candidate	Votes	%	±%	Party votes	%	±%
National	✓ Wyatt Creech	14,505	45.16		10,562	32.81	
Alliance	Dave MacPherson	6,638	20.67		4,409	13.69	
Labour	Lynette Stutz	4,525	14.09		7,704	23.93	
NZ First	George Groombridge	4,519	14.07		5,074	15.76	
ACT	Derek Daniell	742	2.31		2,072	6.44	
Christian Coalition	Mike Lloyd	717	2.23		1,287	4.00	
McGillicuddy Serious	Vince Terreni	236	0.74		95	0.29	
Progressive Green	Mathew Horrocks	160	0.50		105	0.33	
Natural Law	Bruce Brown	53	0.16		90	0.28	
World Socialist	Christopher Fackney	27	0.08				
Legalise Cannabis					486	1.51	
United NZ					198	0.61	
Animals First					43	0.13	
Superannuitants & Youth					18	0.06	
Conservatives					14	0.04	
Mana Māori					10	0.03	
Green Society					8	0.02	
Libertarianz					7	0.02	
Asia Pacific					4	0.01	
Ethnic Minority					4	0.01	
Advance NZ					3	0.01	
Te Tawharau					2	0.01	
Informal votes		185			112		
Total valid votes		32,122			32,195		
National hold	Majority	7,867	24.49				

=== 1993 election ===
1993 general election: Wairarapa
Party	Candidate	Votes	%	±%
National	Wyatt Creech	9,004	41.60	−11.53
Labour	Peter Teahan	6,775	31.30	
Alliance	Dave MacPherson	4,162	19.23	+10.97
NZ First	Jayne Routhan	1,051	4.85	
Christian Heritage	Mike Lloyd	597	2.75	
Natural Law	Ken Reinsfield	51	0.23	
Majority		2,229	10.30	−10.12
Turnout		21,640	86.68	+0.57
Registered electors		24,963		

=== 1990 election ===
1990 general election: Wairarapa
Party	Candidate	Votes	%	±%
National	Wyatt Creech	10,767	53.13	+4.43
Labour	Pauline Moran	6,626	32.69	
NewLabour	Dave MacPherson	1,674	8.26	
Christian Heritage	G Hounsell	651	3.21	
Social Credit	R Muir	236	1.16	
McGillicuddy Serious	S Neilsen	199	0.98	
Democrats	G J Shakes	112	0.55	−2.19
Majority		4,141	20.43	+20.27
Turnout		20,265	86.11	−6.08
Registered electors		23,532		

=== 1987 election ===
1987 general election: Wairarapa
Party	Candidate	Votes	%	±%
National	Wyatt Creech	9,994	48.70	
Labour	Reg Boorman	9,960	48.54	+6.35
Democrats	G J Shakes	564	2.74	
Majority		34	0.16	
Turnout		20,518	92.19	−2.32
Registered electors		22,256		

=== 1984 election ===
1984 general election: Wairarapa
Party	Candidate	Votes	%	±%
Labour	Reg Boorman	9,009	42.19	
National	Ben Couch	8,615	40.34	−3.54
NZ Party	Simon Bliss	2,908	13.61	
Social Credit	M C Jury	819	3.83	
Majority		394	1.84	
Turnout		21,351	94.51	+2.98
Registered electors		22,589		

=== 1981 election ===
1981 general election: Wairarapa
Party	Candidate	Votes	%	±%
National	Ben Couch	8,569	43.88	−1.45
Labour	Tom Gemmell	7,023	35.96	
Social Credit	Wally Cowl	3,936	20.15	+7.89
Majority		1,546	7.91	+3.68
Turnout		19,528	91.53	+13.07
Registered electors		21,333		

=== 1978 election ===
1978 general election: Wairarapa
Party	Candidate	Votes	%	±%
National	Ben Couch	8,968	45.33	−4.10
Labour	Allan Levett	8,131	41.10	
Social Credit	Wally Cowl	2,426	12.26	+6.03
Values	Chris Hackney	258	1.30	
Majority		837	4.23	−3.61
Turnout		19,783	78.46	−10.24
Registered electors		25,213		

=== 1975 election ===
1975 general election: Wairarapa
Party	Candidate	Votes	%	±%
National	Ben Couch	9,245	49.43	+5.17
Labour	Jack Williams	7,777	41.58	−9.20
Social Credit	Wally Cowl	1,167	6.23	
Values	Bill Ashdown	514	2.74	
Majority		1,468	7.84	
Turnout		18,703	88.70	−3.53
Registered electors		21,085		

=== 1972 election ===
1972 general election: Wairarapa
Party	Candidate	Votes	%	±%
Labour	Jack Williams	8,459	50.78	+2.75
National	Ben Couch	7,373	44.26	
Social Credit	Jack Morrow	698	4.19	
Liberal Reform	Timothy Carlton Bunny	94	0.56	
New Democratic	Harold Knox	32	0.19	
Majority		1,086	6.52	+3.71
Turnout		16,656	92.23	+0.28
Registered electors		18,058		

=== 1969 election ===
1969 general election: Wairarapa
Party	Candidate	Votes	%	±%
Labour	Jack Williams	7,981	48.03	+5.44
National	Haddon Donald	7,514	45.22	−0.83
Social Credit	Jack Morrow	1,121	6.74	
Majority		467	2.81	
Turnout		16,616	92.51	+1.77
Registered electors		17,961		

=== 1966 election ===
1966 general election: Wairarapa
Party	Candidate	Votes	%	±%
National	Haddon Donald	7,080	46.05	−1.75
Labour	Jack Williams	6,547	42.59	−1.83
Social Credit	Roly Marks	1,745	11.35	
Majority		533	3.46	+0.09
Turnout		15,372	90.74	−1.53
Registered electors		16,940		

=== 1963 election ===
1963 general election: Wairarapa
Party	Candidate	Votes	%	±%
National	Haddon Donald	7,100	47.80	
Labour	Jack Williams	6,599	44.42	
Social Credit	Robert Crawford	1,154	7.76	−1.81
Majority		501	3.37	
Turnout		14,853	92.27	−0.90
Registered electors		16,097		

=== 1960 election ===
1960 general election: Wairarapa
Party	Candidate	Votes	%	±%
National	Bert Cooksley	7,887	52.10	+3.90
Labour	Allan George Goldsmith	5,799	38.31	
Social Credit	Robert Crawford	1,450	9.57	
Majority		3,241	21.41	+14.25
Turnout		15,136	93.17	−1.43
Registered electors		16,244		

=== 1957 election ===
1957 general election: Wairarapa
Party	Candidate	Votes	%	±%
National	Bert Cooksley	7,121	48.20	−1.11
Labour	Bob Wilkie	6,063	41.04	+3.38
Social Credit	John Eric Feast	1,588	10.75	−2.26
Majority		1,058	7.16	−4.48
Turnout		14,772	94.60	+1.40
Registered electors		15,615		

=== 1954 election ===
1954 general election: Wairarapa
Party	Candidate	Votes	%	±%
National	Bert Cooksley	7,160	49.31	−7.80
Labour	Bob Wilkie	5,469	37.66	
Social Credit	John Eric Feast	1,890	13.01	
Majority		1,691	11.64	−2.59
Turnout		14,519	93.20	+0.98
Registered electors		15,578		

=== 1951 election ===
1951 General election: Wairarapa
Party	Candidate	Votes	%	±%
National	Bert Cooksley	8,155	57.11	+3.73
Labour	George Anders Hansen	6,123	42.88	−3.73
Majority		2,032	14.23	+7.47
Turnout		14,278	92.22	−3.45
Registered electors		15,482		

=== 1949 election ===
1949 general election: Wairarapa
Party	Candidate	Votes	%	±%
National	Bert Cooksley	7,596	53.38	
Labour	George Anders Hansen	6,633	46.61	−2.54
Majority		963	6.76	
Turnout		14,229	95.67	+1.11
Registered electors		14,872		

=== 1946 election ===
1946 general election: Wairarapa
Party	Candidate	Votes	%	±%
National	Garnet Mackley	7,095	50.84	
Labour	George Anders Hansen	6,860	49.15	
Majority		235	1.68	
Turnout		13,955	94.56	+3.25
Registered electors		14,757		

=== 1943 election ===
1943 general election: Wairarapa
Party	Candidate	Votes	%	±%
Labour	Ben Roberts	4,806	47.34	−3.67
National	Jimmy Maher	4,655	45.86	
Democratic Labour	Robert Crawford	424	4.17	
Independent	William Francis Smithson	120	1.18	
Informal votes		145	1.42	+0.98
Majority		151	1.48	−6.40
Turnout		10,150	91.31	−1.97
Registered electors		11,115		

=== 1938 election ===
1938 general election: Wairarapa
Party	Candidate	Votes	%	±%
Labour	Ben Roberts	5,293	53.71	+14.77
National	James Frederick Thompson	4,516	45.83	
Informal votes		44	0.44	−1.22
Majority		777	7.88	+7.54
Turnout		9,853	93.28	+4.57
Registered electors		10,562		

=== 1935 election ===
1935 general election: Wairarapa
Party	Candidate	Votes	%	±%
Labour	Ben Roberts	3,681	38.94	
United	John Wiltshire Card	3,648	38.59	
Democrat	Thomas William McDonald	2,033	21.50	−24.95
Independent	Hans Carl Thomsen	91	0.96	
Informal votes		157	1.66	−0.03
Majority		33	0.34	
Turnout		9,453	88.71	+5.38
Registered electors		10,655		

=== 1931 election ===
1931 general election: Wairarapa
Party	Candidate	Votes	%	±%
Reform	Alex McLeod	4,641	53.55	+6.74
United	Thomas William McDonald	4,025	46.45	−6.74
Majority		616	7.11	+0.74
Informal votes		149	1.69	+0.39
Turnout		8,815	83.33	−4.91
Registered electors		10,579		

=== 1928 election ===
1928 general election: Wairarapa
Party	Candidate	Votes	%	±%
United	Thomas William McDonald	4,726	53.18	
Reform	Alex McLeod	4,160	46.82	
Majority		566	6.37	
Informal votes		117	1.30	
Turnout		9,003	88.24	
Registered electors		10,203		

=== 1899 election ===
1899 general election: Wairarapa
Party	Candidate	Votes	%	±%
Liberal	J. T. Marryat Hornsby	1,974	51.17	
Conservative	Wally Buchanan	1,818	47.12	
Independent	Coleman Phillips	66	1.71	
Majority		156	4.04	
Turnout		3,858	82.54	
Registered electors		4,674		

=== 1893 election ===
1893 general election: Wairarapa
Party	Candidate	Votes	%	±%
Conservative	Wally Buchanan	1,806	50.89	±0
Liberal	George Augustus Fairbrother	1,116	31.45	
Liberal	Charles Pownall	627	17.67	
Majority		690	19.44	+3.26
Turnout		3,549	81.12	+9.41
Registered electors		4,375		

=== 1890 election ===
1890 general election: Wairarapa
Party	Candidate	Votes	%	±%
Conservative	Wally Buchanan	987	58.09	
Liberal	Henry Bunny	712	41.91	
Majority		275	16.18	
Turnout		1,699	71.71	
Registered electors		2,369		
