= Henry Bunny =

New Zealand politician

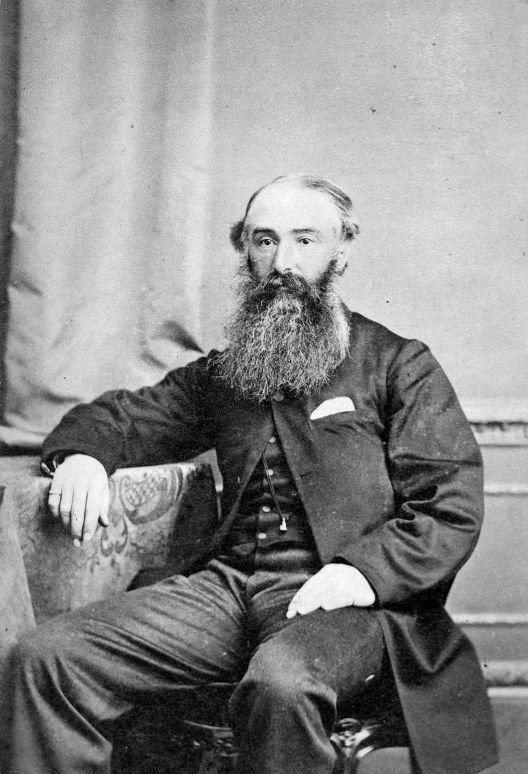

Member of the New Zealand Parliament for Wairarapa
- In office 29 July 1865 – 8 November 1881
- Preceded by: Charles Carter
- Succeeded by: in abeyance

Personal details
- Born: 7 October 1822 Newbury, Berkshire, England
- Died: 15 February 1891 (aged 68) Featherston, New Zealand
- Party: Independent
- Relations: Edmund Percy Bunny (son); Charles H. Broad (grandson); Edward Broad (grandson)
- Occupation: solicitor

Henry Bunny (7 October 1822 – 15 February 1891) was a 19th-century Member of Parliament in the Wairarapa, New Zealand.

Bunny was born in Newbury, Berkshire, and he was a partner in his father's firm of Newbury solicitors during his early life. Facing bankruptcy due to a failed property development scheme, he fled to New Zealand in 1853. He eventually applied to the New Zealand Bar, but he became its first member to be disbarred when it was discovered that his sponsor was his own brother-in-law. Bunny had a relatively successful political career from 1864 until 1881. He was then a failed candidate in four elections (1881, 1884, 1887, 1890), repeatedly defeated by his political rival Walter Clarke Buchanan. Bunny committed suicide on 15 February 1891, shooting himself through the heart with a revolver.

== Early life ==
Henry Bunny was born in 1822 in Newbury in Berkshire, the second son of Jere Bunny, solicitor, of that town and his wife, Clara, only surviving daughter of Samuel Slocock, banker, also of Newbury. He married Catherine Bunny (née Baker, born 24 June 1818 in Newbury) on 22 October 1844.

== Scandal in England ==
Bunny was a partner in his father's firm of Newbury solicitors. He was town clerk of Newbury between 1849 and 1853. He fled to New Zealand in 1853 and was declared a bankrupt after the scandalous collapse of a property development scheme at Donnington Square in Newbury. He was struck off by the Law Society in 1859.

== Career in New Zealand ==
New Zealand Parliament
Years	Term	Electorate	Party
1865–1865	3rd	Wairarapa	Independent
1866–1870	4th	Wairarapa	Independent
1871–1875	5th	Wairarapa	Independent
1876–1879	6th	Wairarapa	Independent
1879–1881	7th	Wairarapa	Independent

Bunny emigrated to New Zealand together with his wife and children, his sister and her husband, Rev. Arthur Baker, on the Duke of Portland, leaving Plymouth on 19 November 1853. He settled on a sheep station in the Wairarapa and built a house named Longwood after Napoleon's residence in exile on Saint Helena. Bunny applied to the New Zealand Bar, was admitted in 1858, but became the first member to be disbarred when it was discovered his sponsor, Rev. Arthur Baker, was his brother-in-law. Baker became involved in a later scandal and was branded 'the horse-whipped vicar'.

Bunny was on the Wellington Provincial Council, representing Wairarapa (1864–1865) and then Wairarapa West (1865–1876). He was on the Executive Council (1871–1873) and was Secretary-Treasurer and the Council's last Deputy-Superintendent in 1876. He was elected to represent the Wairarapa electorate in the New Zealand General Assembly from an 1865 by-election to 1881, when he was defeated for the new electorate of Wairarapa South by Walter Clarke Buchanan.

A resignation in the Thorndon electorate caused an 1884 by-election. At the nomination meeting, Thomas Dwan, Alfred Newman and Henry Bunny were proposed as candidates, with Dwan winning the show of hands. At the election on 14 May 1884, Newman, Bunny and Dwan received 636, 379 and 121 votes, respectively.

Bunny was defeated by Buchanan in the 1884 election in Wairarapa South, and in 1887 and 1890 in Wairarapa.

== Family, death and commemoration ==
Bunny's first wife died on 24 July 1864. She was buried at Bolton Street Cemetery in Wellington. On 30 January 1867 at Featherston, Bunny married Eliza "Bessie" Thorne, the daughter of Samuel Thorne from Chapeltown in Yorkshire, England.

On 3 October 1867 at St Mary's Cathedral in Wellington, Isabella Mary Bunny (1849–1932), his second daughter from his first marriage, married Lowther Broad (1840–1892). Broad had been goldfields warden at Queenstown, was resident magistrate in Arrowtown at the time of their wedding, and later a judge at the District Court in Nelson. Charles Broad (1828–1879) was Lowther Broad's elder brother. Charles Harrington Broad (1872–1959), a cricketer and school principal, was the son of Isabella and Lowther Broad.

In 1878 his daughter Eleanor Caroline (Nellie) Bunny (1860–1938) married runholder Edward Riddiford.

Bunny took his own life on 15 February 1891. He went to the Road Board office in his home town Featherston, asked for the key to the office and once he arrived there, shot himself through the heart with a revolver. He was buried at Featherston Cemetery. The village of Bunnythorpe is named after him. His second wife died at Opaki, a small village near Masterton, in 1915 aged 80. She was buried at Masterton Cemetery.

== Notes ==
New Zealand Parliament
Preceded by Charles Carter	Member of Parliament for Wairarapa; 1865–1881; Served alongside: John Chapman Andrew, George Beetham	In abeyance Title next held by Walter Clarke Buchanan
