= Wally Buchanan =

New Zealand politician

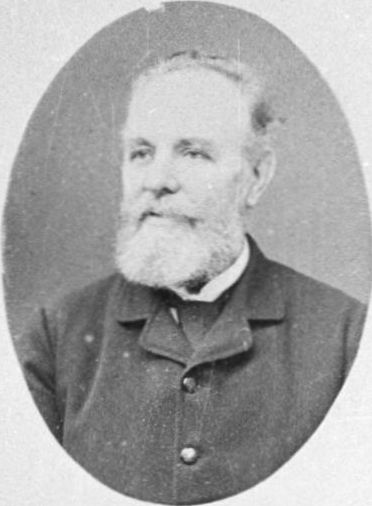
- Buchanan in 1882

Member of the New Zealand Legislative Council
- In office 23 June 1915 – 19 July 1924
- Appointed by: William Massey

Personal details
- Born: 20 June 1838 Kilmodan, Argyllshire, Scotland
- Died: 19 July 1924 (aged 86) Masterton, New Zealand
- Occupation: Politician, farmer

Sir Walter Clarke Buchanan (20 June 1838 – 19 July 1924), known as Wally, was a New Zealand politician who became a member of the Reform Party that formed in 1909. Despite never being appointed as a minister, he was an influential politician and a strong advocate for farming interests.

== Early life ==
Buchanan was born in 1838 in Kilmodan, Argyllshire, Scotland. He was the son of the farmer Donald McChananich and of his wife Janet Clarke. He was baptised under McChananich, the Gaelic version of Buchanan. He attended Greenock Academy, and moved to Australia at the age of 18, where he became a farmer. Around 1863 he moved to New Zealand.

== Political career ==
New Zealand Parliament
Years	Term	Electorate	Party
1881–1884	8th	Wairarapa South	Conservative
1884–1887	9th	Wairarapa South	Conservative
1887–1890	10th	Wairarapa	Conservative
1890–1893	11th	Wairarapa	Conservative
1893–1896	12th	Wairarapa	Conservative
1896–1899	13th	Wairarapa	Conservative
1902–1905	15th	Wairarapa	Conservative
1908–1909	17th	Wairarapa	Conservative
1909–1911	Changed allegiance to:		Reform
1911–1914	18th	Wairarapa	Reform

Buchanan entered politics in 1881, representing first Wairarapa South from 1881 to 1887, and then Wairarapa from 1887 to 1899, 1902 to 1905 and 1908 to 1914. He was in Parliament for much of the next 33 years, losing three elections.

In the four general elections between 1881 and 1890, he always beat Henry Bunny, who had represented the Wairarapa electorate continuously since an 1865 by-election.

He lost Wairarapa to J. T. Marryat Hornsby, the frequent Liberal Party candidate for the electorate, in 1899, won it back in 1902, lost it in 1905 and won it back in 1908. He finally lost the seat to Hornsby in 1914.

In the House, he was a staunch conservative voice, and a diehard opponent of the Liberal government of Richard Seddon. He shared William Massey's idea that the conservative opposition needed a more formalised political party in order to effectively challenge the Liberal Party. Buchanan used his personal wealth to fund the new Reform Party that was set up by Massey in 1909, continuing to provide it with money until his death.

Buchanan was knighted in 1913 and appointed to the Legislative Council in 1915, where he served until his death in 1924. Despite his long experience in politics, he was never appointed a Minister (partly because the Liberal Party was in power as from 1891 to 1914).

Buchanan, alongside another influential farmer politician Sir James Wilson, supported a wartime arrangement to sell New Zealand's entire 1916 wool clip supply to Britain to support the war effort during World War I. It was proposal offering the price from the 1913–14 season with a 45% advance, rather than the inflated wartime value, which the government and Buchanan argued was necessary for the war effort. The advance was later increased to 55% to be consistent with a price offered to farmers in Australia. Buchanan was appointed honorary colonel of the 17th (Ruahine) Regiment in 1916.

== Death ==
Buchanan died on 19 July 1924 of heart failure following a car crash. He had never married. He was buried at Clareville Cemetery, Carterton.

== Notes ==
New Zealand Parliament
New constituency	Member of Parliament for Wairarapa South; 1881–1887	Constituency abolished
In abeyance Title last held by Henry Bunny, George Beetham	Member of Parliament for Wairarapa; 1887–1899 1902–1905 1908–1914	Succeeded by J. T. Marryat Hornsby
Preceded by J. T. Marryat Hornsby	Member of Parliament for Wairarapa; 1887–1899 1902–1905 1908–1914	Succeeded by J. T. Marryat Hornsby
