= John Chapman Andrew =

New Zealand politician (1822–1907)

John Andrew
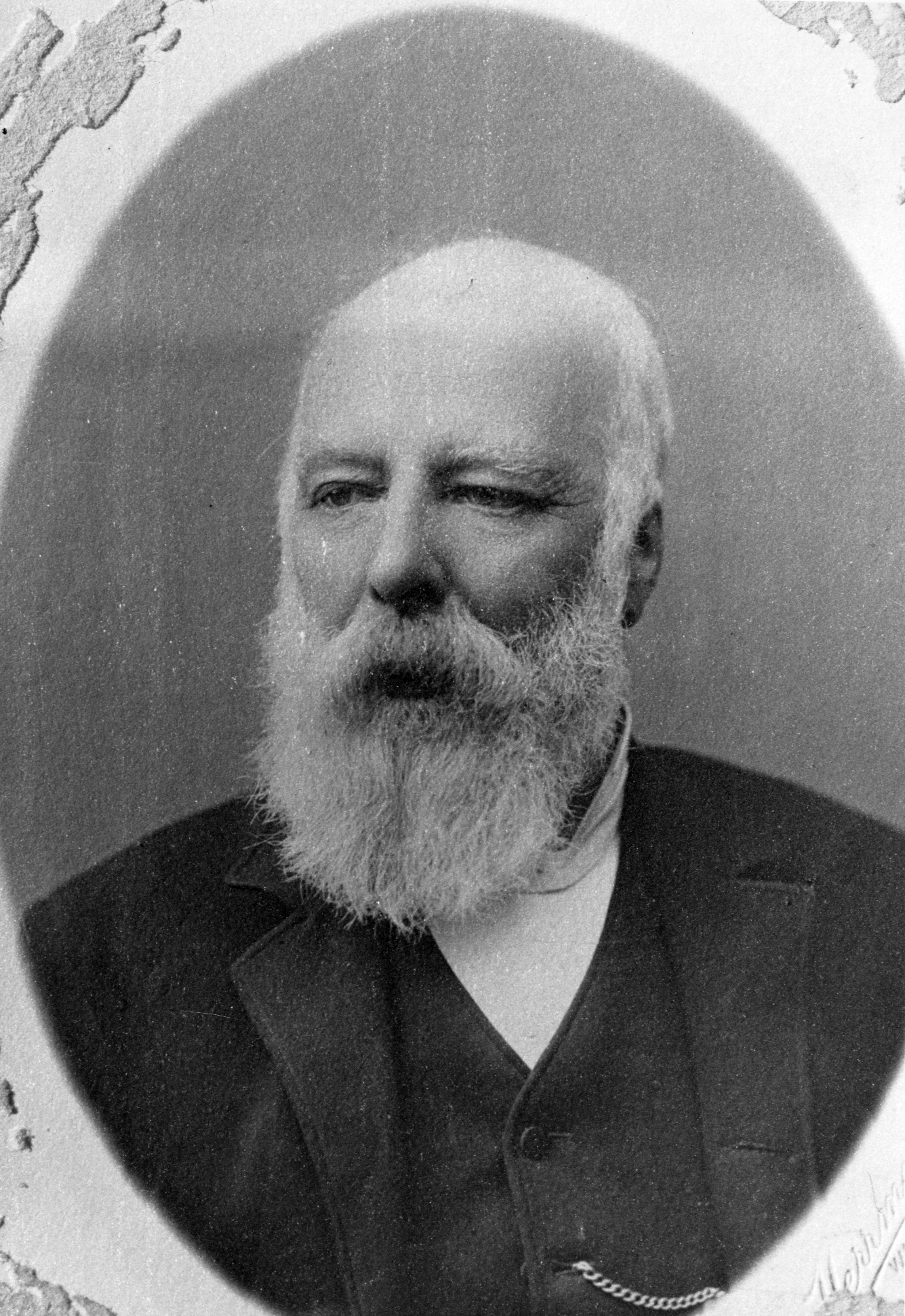
- Parson Andrew c. 1883

Member of the New Zealand Parliament for Wairarapa
- In office 1871–1875
- Preceded by: Henry Bunny
- Succeeded by: George Beetham

7th Headmaster of Nelson College
- In office 1876–1886
- Preceded by: Frank Churchill Simmons
- Succeeded by: William Justice Ford

Personal details
- Born: John Chapman Andrew; 9 March 1822 Whitby, Yorkshire, England
- Died: 7 December 1907 (aged 85) Otaki, New Zealand
- Resting place: Stoke, New Zealand; 41.3127°S 173.2347°E
- Spouses: Emma Fendall (m. 1855; died 1878) Emily Morgan (m. 1880)
- Relations: William Hudson (grandson); James Hudson (son-in-law)
- Children: Six (three sons, three daughters)

John Chapman Andrew (9 March 1822 – 7 December 1907) was a 19th-century Church of England priest, Oxford don, educationist, pastoralist and Member of Parliament in New Zealand.

Born a Yorkshireman, well-educated, he emigrated with his new wife, Emma, to New Zealand in 1856 aged 34 and they took full part in the development of the new colony's important institutions.

== Early life and family ==
Andrew was born at Whitby, Yorkshire, England. His parents were James Andrew, an Anglican clergyman, and Jane Chapman, of the Chapman banking family (grand daughter of John Chapman – Simpson, Chapman and Co.). He was educated at St Peter's School, York and obtained a scholarship to University College, Oxford and graduated BA and MA in 1844 and 1847, respectively.

Andrew was preceded at Oxford University by his elder brother William who won a fellowship at Worcester College and was followed by his younger brother James who distinguished himself in the classics. In later life James became a well known surgeon at St Bartholemew's and a noted medical author; he was subsequently elected a fellow of Wadham College.

In 1848, Andrew was ordained priest. He had become a fellow of Lincoln College, Oxford, and vicar of St Michael at the North Gate at the comparatively young age of mid 20s.

On 6 December 1855, Andrew married Emma Fendall, youngest daughter of Henry Fendall, vicar of Crambe. and of the Fendall banking family (grand daughter of William Fendall, Old Bank). The marriage broke the tradition of celibacy for Fellows of Lincoln College, so Andrew had to resign. The couple emigrated to New Zealand, arriving at Lyttelton on the Westminster on 7 June 1856. Other Fendalls went to New Zealand before them, and the Christchurch suburb of Fendalton is named after the original landholding of her brother Walpole.

== Member of Parliament ==
New Zealand Parliament
Years	Term	Electorate	Party
1871–1875	5th	Wairarapa	Independent
1876–1877	6th	Wairarapa	Independent

He was on the Wellington Provincial Council, representing the Wairarapa East electorate from 1867 to 1876. He represented the Wairarapa electorate from 1871 to 1877, when he resigned. As a parliamentarian he was a strong advocate of enfranchising the right for women to vote and active on educational issues.

== Educationalist ==
He was also an educationalist; an Anglican priest he was known as "Parson Andrew" in Nelson, New Zealand where he was head of Nelson College, and he was a supporter of the new University of New Zealand.

Andrew's role within the University of New Zealand was a supporter of its inception as a member of the house of representatives advocating a federal university structure for New Zealand. He was appointed to The University of New Zealand senate in 1874 and then appointed as Vice Chancellor of The University of New Zealand in 1885, he maintained the position of Vice Chancellor until 1903.

Andrew oversaw the founding and establishment of Victoria University College (now Victoria University of Wellington) as Victoria University's founding Vice Chancellor and was a vocal advocate for a University of New Zealand college being established in Wellington, as Wellington was the capital of New Zealand.

Andrew received three honorary degrees, one from the University of New Zealand, one from the University of Melbourne and one from the University of Sydney. He later returned to Oxford University and had his Robes returned as the policies on marriage of the Oxford Dons had changed and he had also been widely recognised as the Vice Chancellor of The University of New Zealand. He described his return and restoration of his Oxford robes as the most satisfying moment of his life.

== Ica Station ==
Andrew purchased a pastoral farming estate in the Wairarapa on the north bank of the Whareama river near Tīnui and Castlepoint which he built up until in 1889 he was taxed on 18,170 acres. The bales of wool it produced were shipped from Castlepoint to London with his initials as their identifying mark. As a scholar of ancient Greek literature and Oxford University lecturer in ancient Greek and named John (Ioannis) it was his habit to write his initials I.C.A. and Ica (eye-car) soon came to be the recognised name of his station.

New Zealand Parliament
Preceded by Henry Bunny	Member of Parliament for Wairarapa; 1871–1877; Served alongside: Henry Bunny	Succeeded by George Beetham
