= Longwood, Featherston =

Coordinates: 41.1387°S 175.3411°E

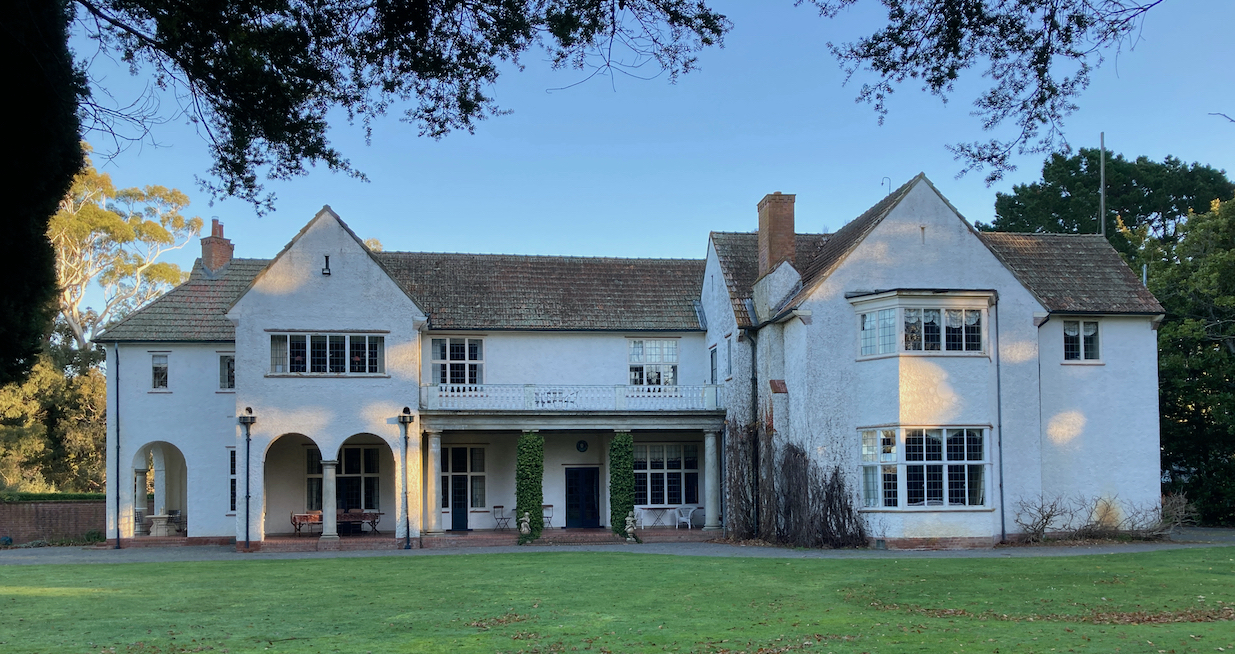
Longwood today

Longwood is an historic house south of Featherston, New Zealand, built for the Pharazyn family in 1906 and home to the Riddiford family for much of the 20th century. It replaced a c.1857 house built by Henry Bunny which he named after Longwood House, Napoleon's residence on Saint Helena. Designed by John Sydney Swan, Longwood is registered with Heritage New Zealand as a Category I heritage building and is one of New Zealand's largest country houses.

== Origins ==
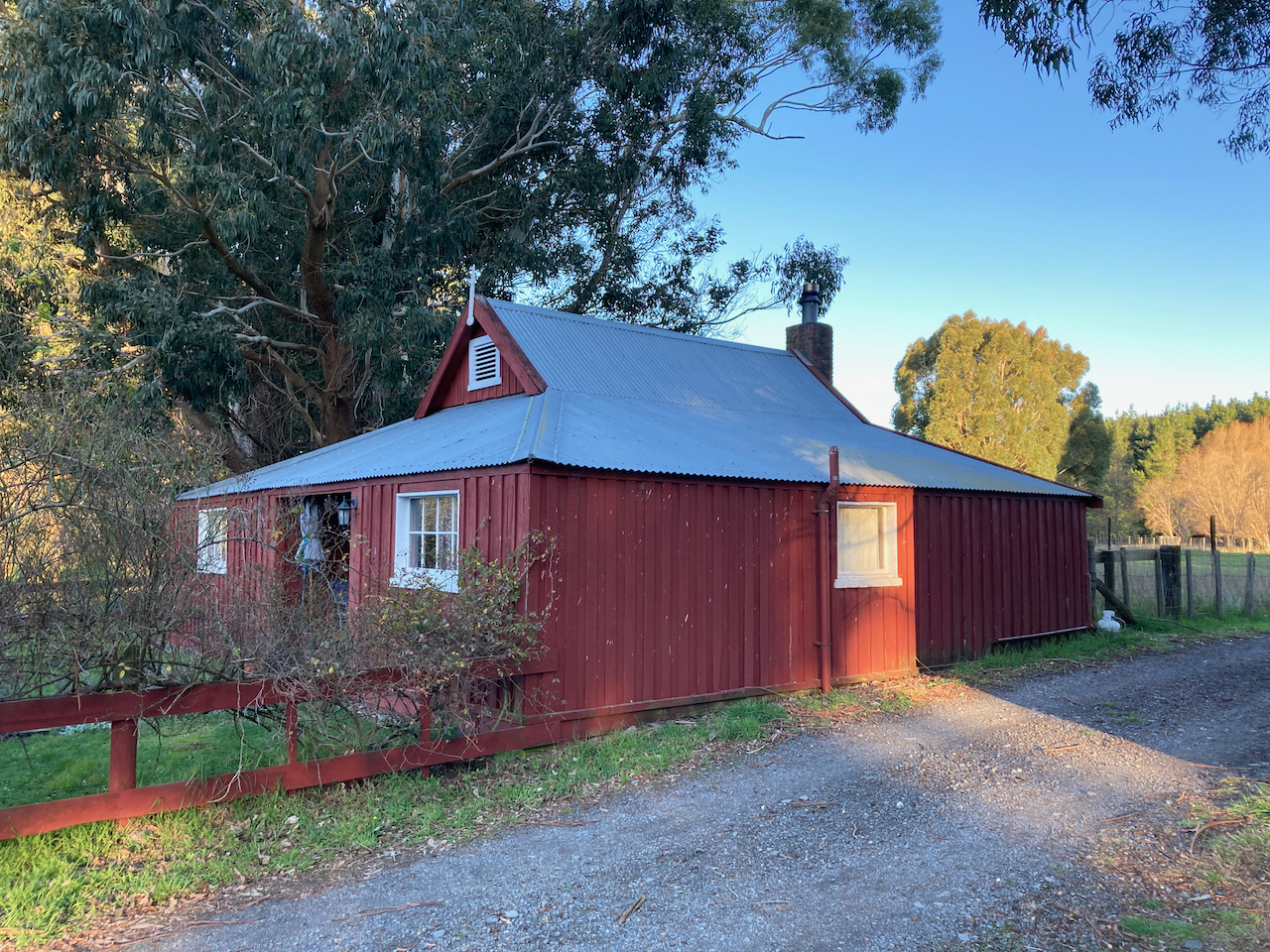
Farm worker housing built around 1857 on the grounds of Longwood

Longwood was established as a Wairarapa sheep station in 1857 by English solicitor Henry Bunny (1822–1891), who had come to New Zealand in 1853 fleeing bankruptcy and built up a law practice in Wellington. In 1853 the Crown had purchased the Owhango Block of land in South Wairarapa from Ngāti Kahungunu, and in 1856 established the settlement of Featherston, dividing the land into urban and (expensive) rural sections, one of which was purchased by Bunny.

Bunny built a typical two-storey colonial house with dormer windows in a shingled roof and a wide glazed verandah. He also laid out 8 acres of gardens planted with English specimen trees, but retained two tōtara trees now thought to be 700 years old. On the grounds he built stables, a cookhouse, granary, and cow shed. The house was named "Longwood" after Longwood House, Napoleon's place of exile on Saint Helena; Henry's brother General Arthur Bunny had visited Napoleon's grave and taken cuttings of the willows growing there. He sent them to Henry to plant on the grounds, where they still exist today.

Bunny sold Longwood in 1871 to early Wellington settler Charles Johnson Pharazyn. Pharazyn enlarged the house with a substantial two-storey wing, retaining the original modest house as servants' quarters. He committed suicide in 1903 by throwing himself into the Thames, and the house was passed on to his grandson Charles Buckland Pharazyn (1868–1938).

Longwood burnt down in 1905, but some of the outbuildings still survive. They include some of New Zealand's oldest extant farm buildings, and consist of a cowshed, granary, coachhouse and stables, derelict greenhouse, polo stables, and a cookhouse/workers accommodation building now known as the "Gamekeeper's Cottage".

== 1906 house ==
Charles Buckland Pharazyn rebuilt Longwood in 1906. The new house, designed by Wellington architect John Sydney Swan, was built of severe (and fire-resistant) brick in a Scottish-baronial style. In 1910, not long after the house had been completed, the Pharazyns moved to Sydney and leased it to the Governor of New Zealand and his wife; they sold Longwood and its 100 acres in 1911 to Daniel H.S. Riddiford (a grandson of Henry Bunny) and his wife Meta Riddiford. Daniel Riddiford used Longwood as a home base from which to run his other farm estates, which generated the family income.

Meta Riddiford was not impressed with Longwood's architecture: she wrote to her mother that "it is not a house that improves upon acquaintance. I really think Swan the architect must be a fool and a knave." In 1913 the Riddifords engaged the services of William Gray Young to renovate Longwood. The plan was interrupted by the Great War: Dan Riddiford joined the Grenadier Guards, and the family moved to Lyme Regis. Longwood was leased to the army as officer accommodation for the Featherston Military Camp nearby.

Longwood in the 1920s–1930s

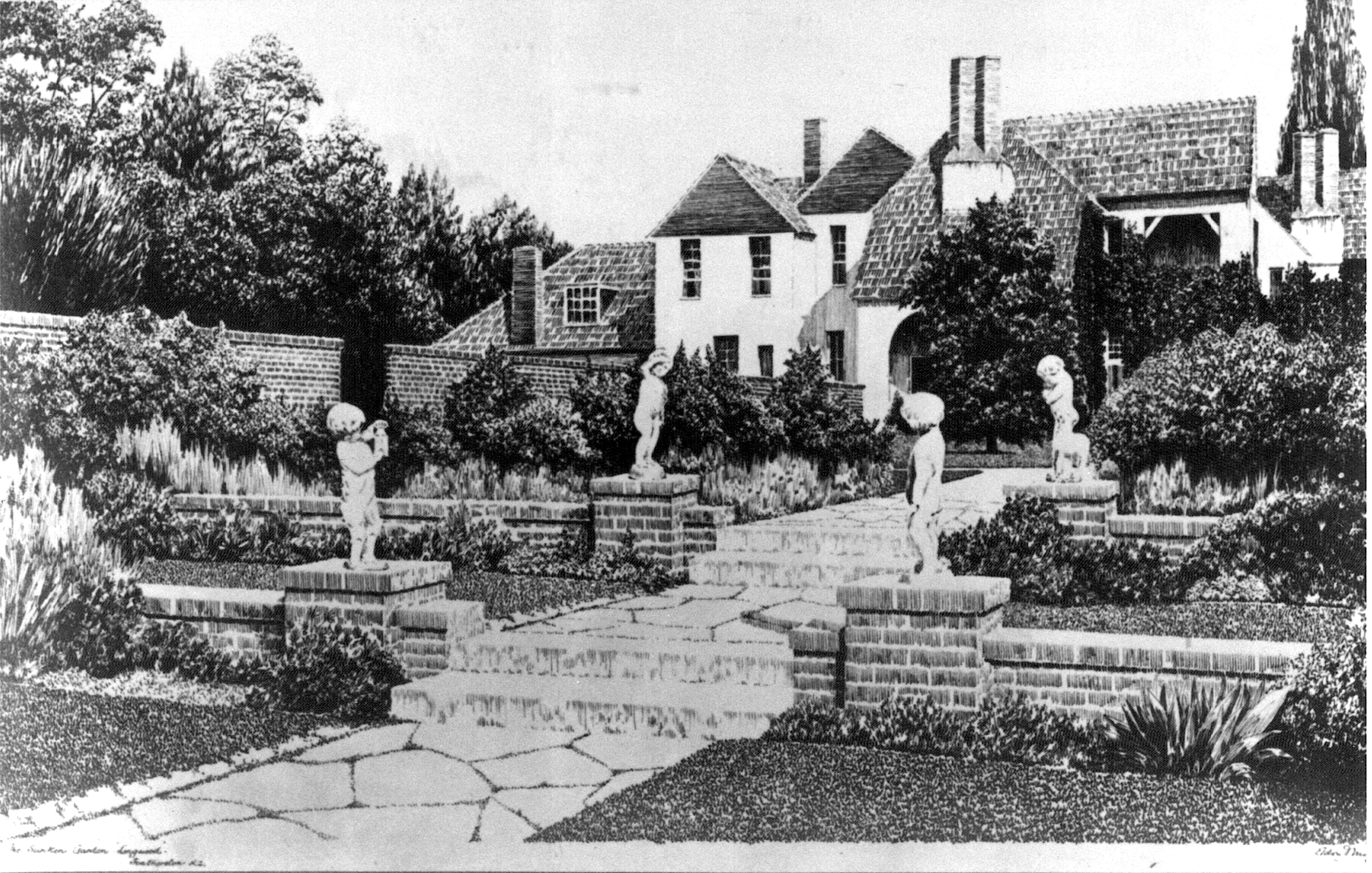
Sunken garden

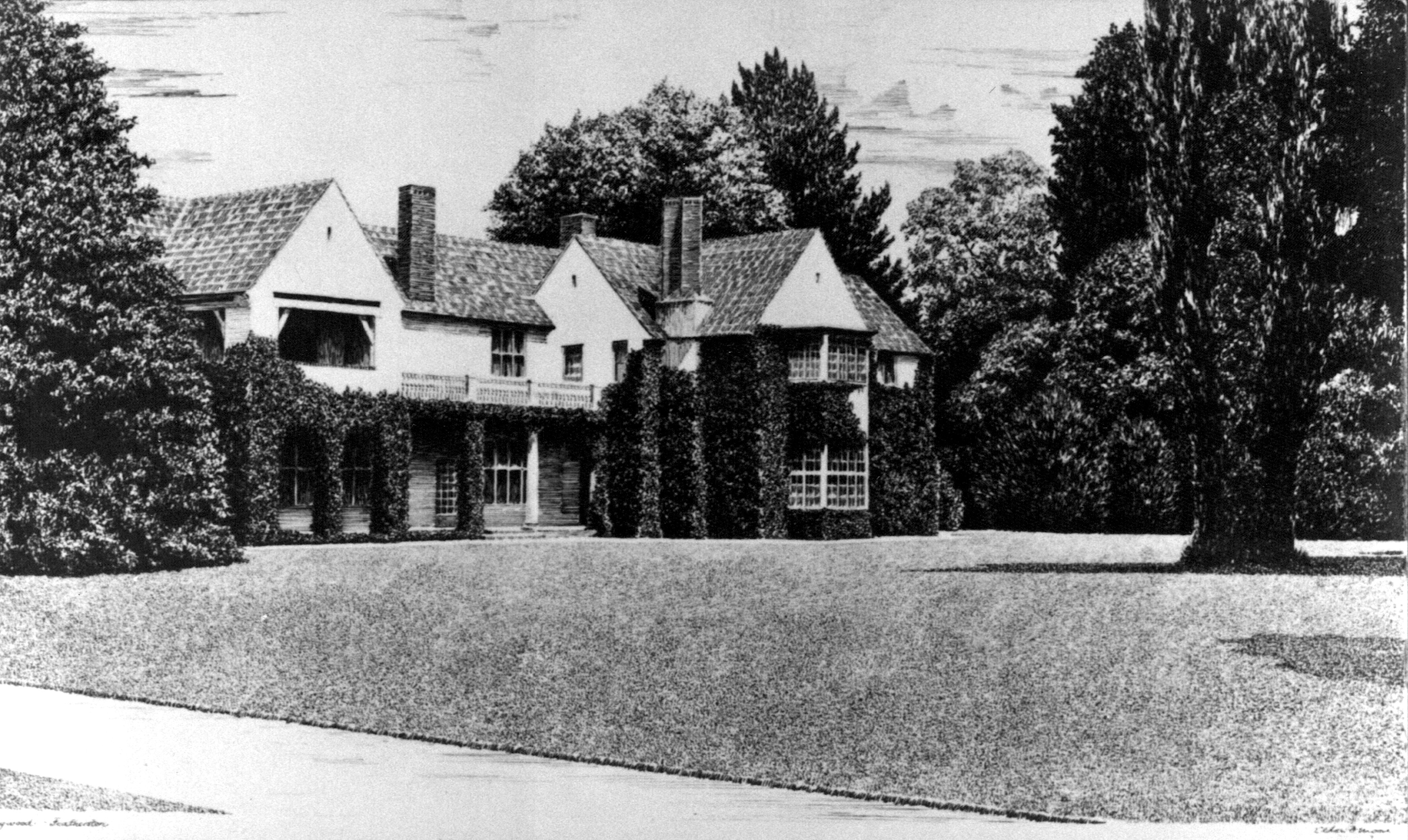
Front of house

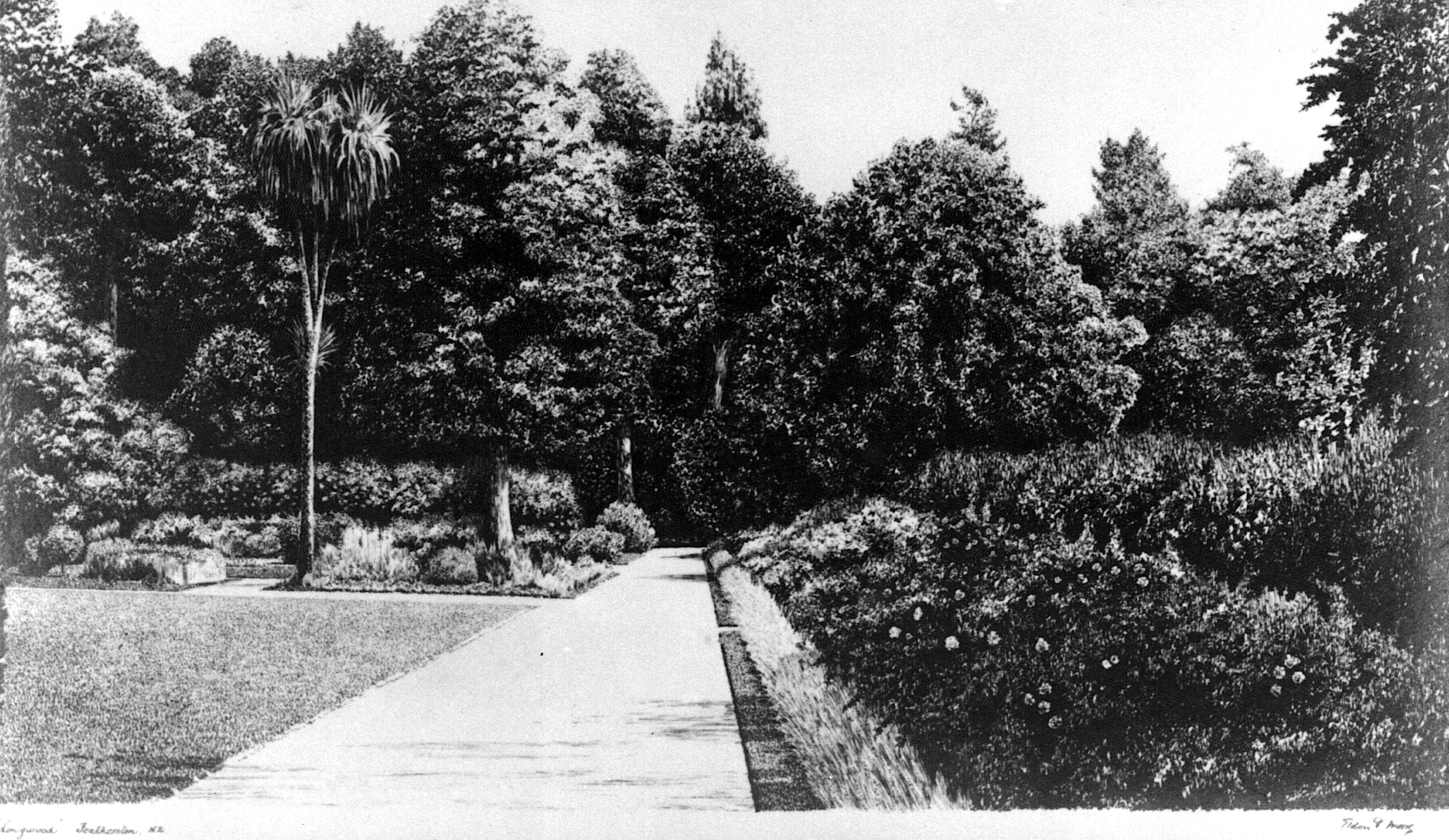
Walkway across front

By 1921 much of the house had been remodelled with a Lutyens-inspired exterior and neo-Georgian revival interior. This enlarged it to 14,000 square feet and gave it its present appearance: "a competent essay of English elegance". With over 40 rooms, including 16 bedrooms, the house was situated amongst large formal gardens and approached via a long driveway through a grove of mature trees. New polo stables and garaging for five cars was constructed behind the house in 1923: all the cars were Daimlers until the 1950s, Chryslers afterwards. The grounds contained formal flower gardens, a lily pond fed by a water race, and a sunken garden inspired by one at Hampton Court and decorated with statues representing the four seasons. A nearby greenhouse built in 1923 was heated by a boiler to grow table grapes, lettuces, and flowers over winter.

Longwood today

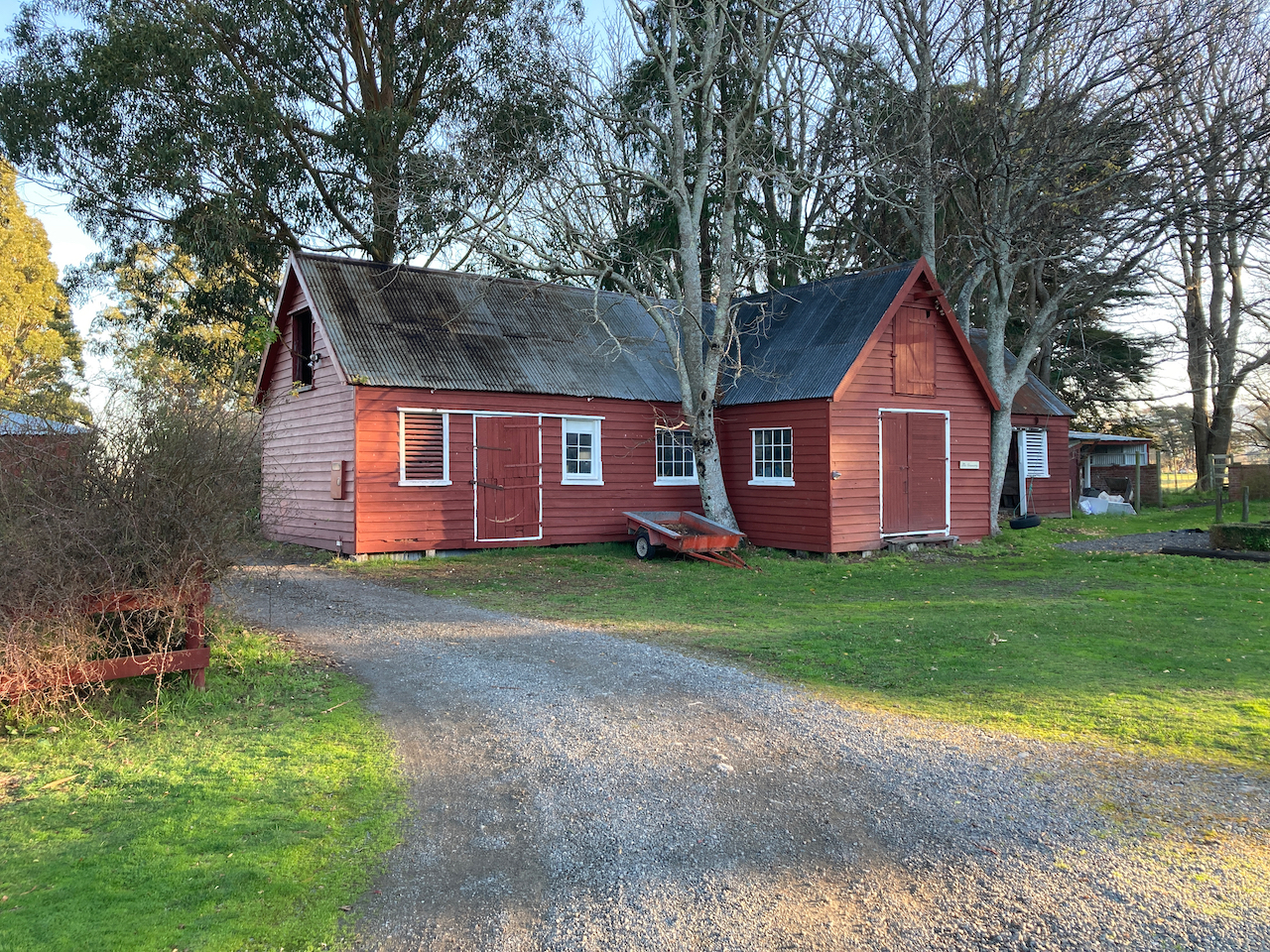
Granary (late 1850s)

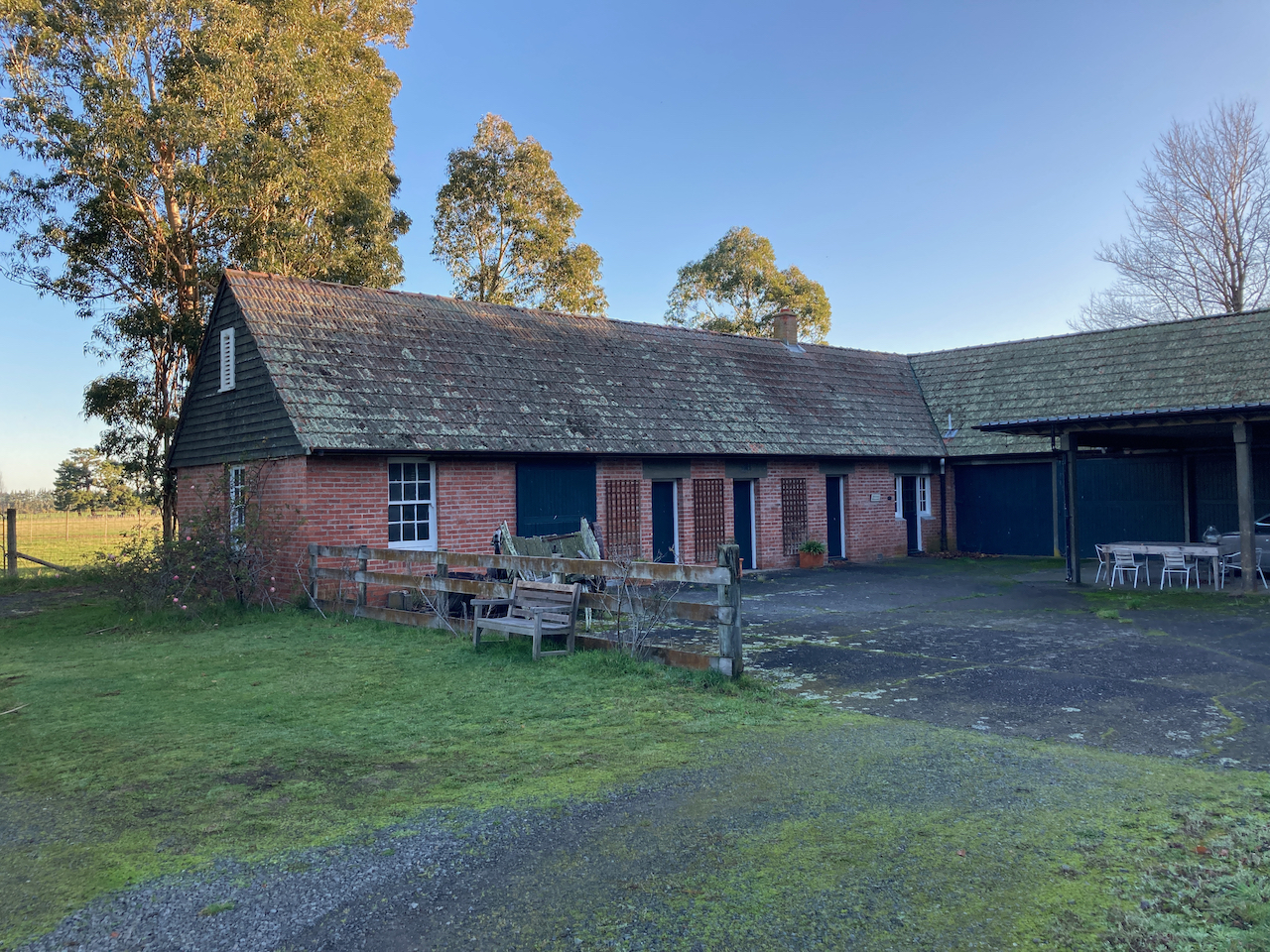
Polo stables and garage (1923)

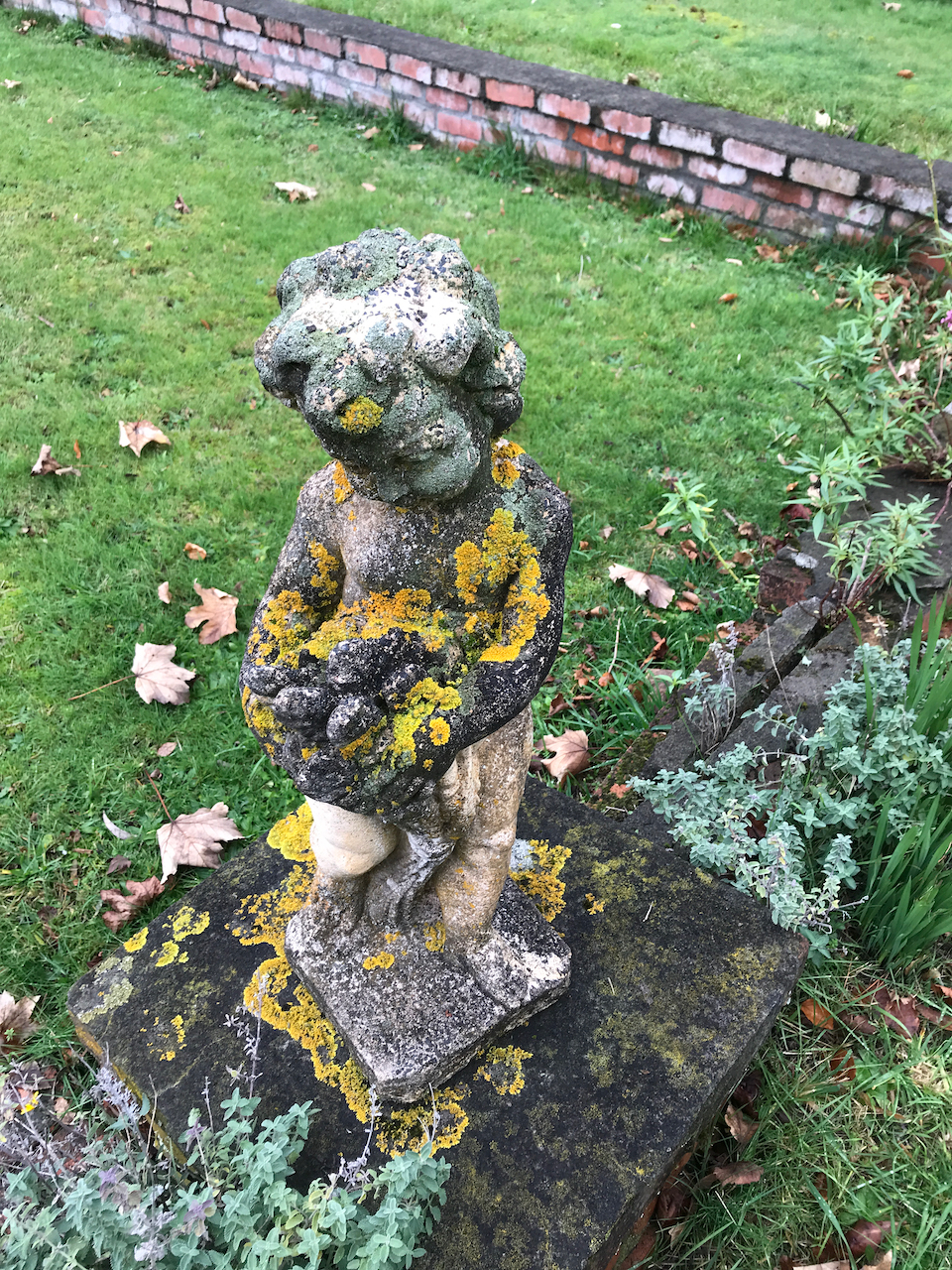
Statue of Summer holding a garland in the sunken garden

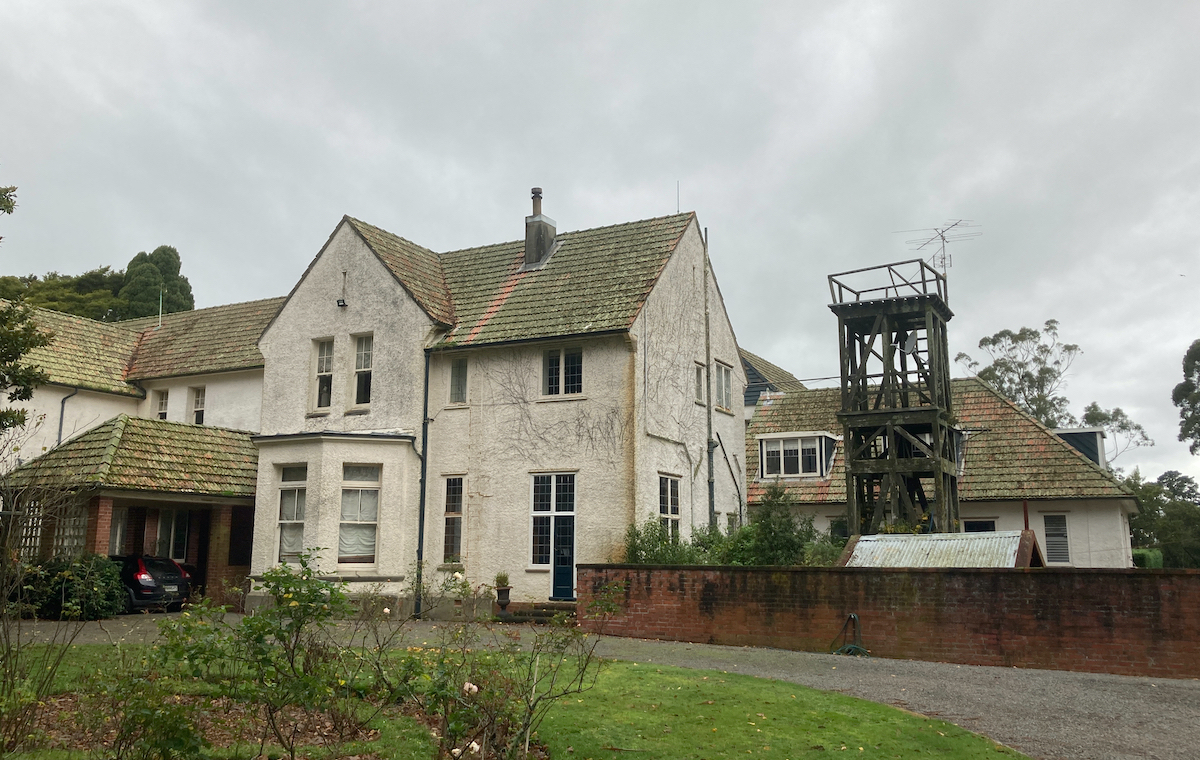
Rear of house with former machine-gun tower from Featherston WWII POW Camp

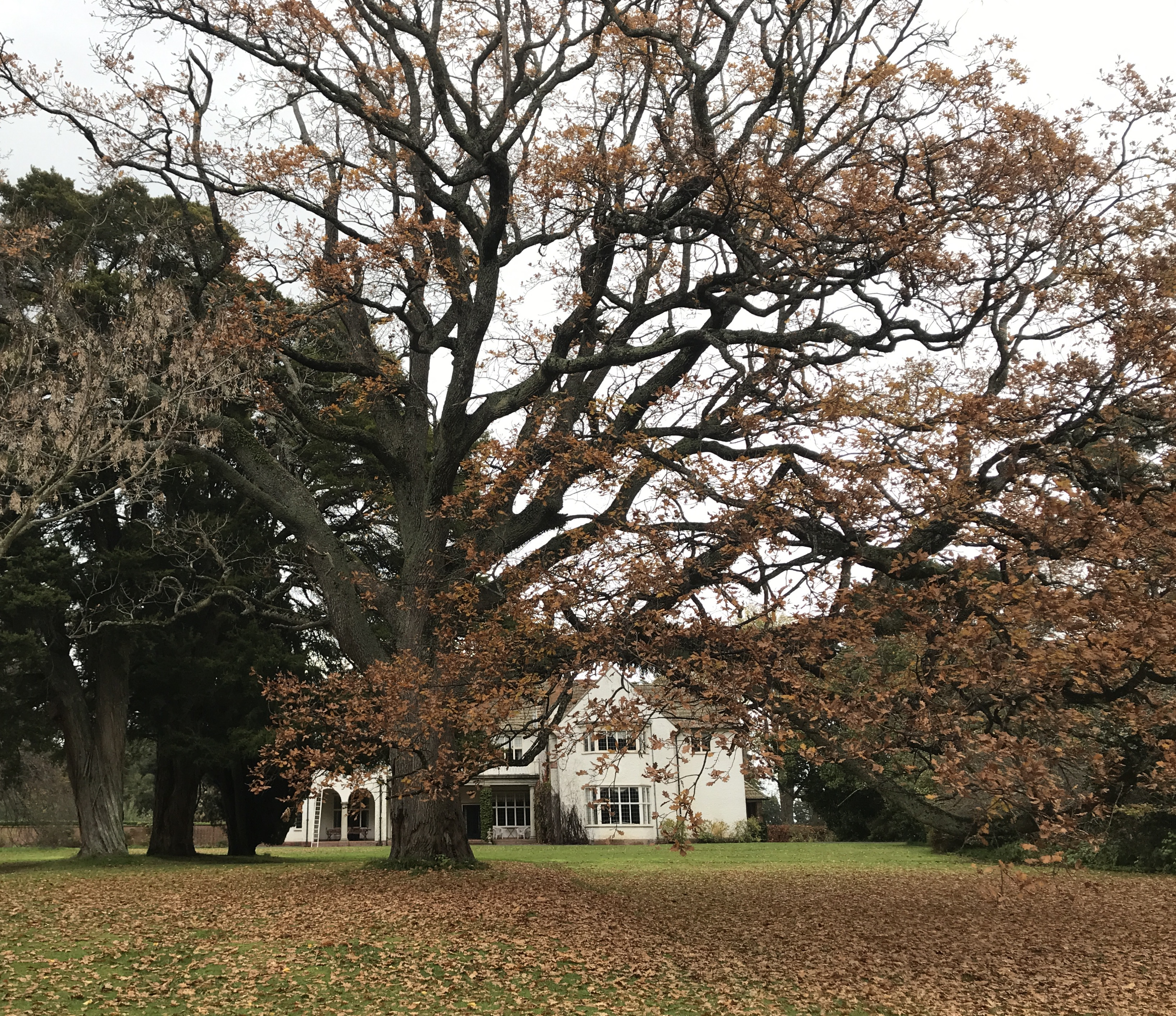
Original oak and tōtara plantings on the front lawn

As country gentry, the Riddifords hosted many high society and charity events and garden parties in the 1920s and 1930s. At one point the house had a staff of thirteen, including a nanny, butler, four gardeners, a governess, and maids. The house went into a decline after World War II, and the staff was reduced to six. Meta Riddiford died in 1963 and Dan in 1971, and the property went to their second son Tom, who moved in with his family in 1972. By the late 1980s the staff was reduced to a gardener and part-time cleaner, and the Riddifords sold it at auction in 1989 for $500,000 to the developer Roland Wallace Lamb.

The present owners, Garrick Emms and Marguerite Tait-Jamieson, purchased Longwood from Lamb in 1992 and run the property as a country lodge, maintaining and restoring the garden and outbuildings. On 11 May 2007 Longwood was gazetted as an Historic Place Category I on the list maintained by Heritage New Zealand.
