= James Hudson (explorer) =

New Zealand doctor and explorer (1854–1912)

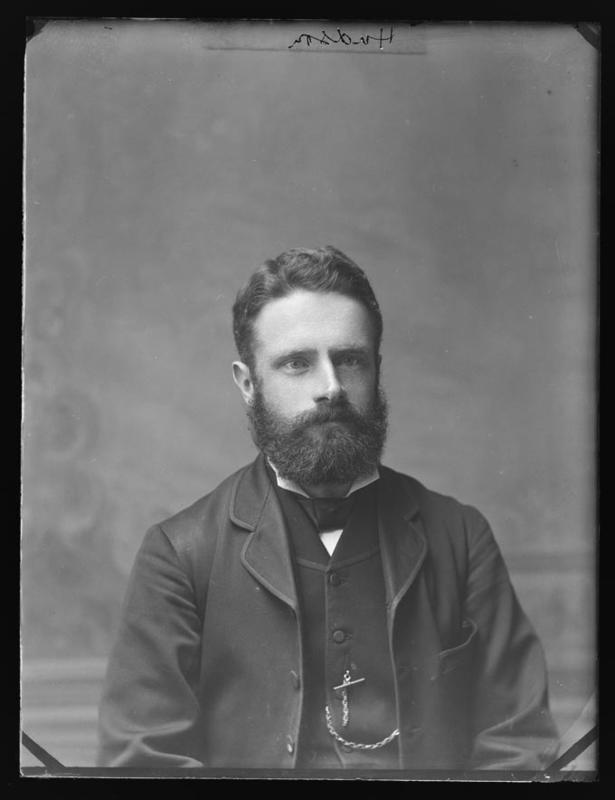
Dr Hudson. Nelson Provincial Museum, Tyree Studio Collection 18777: Relations / Sir William Hudson (Son)George V. Hudson (Brother)

James Hudson (13 October 1854 – 8 July 1912) was a New Zealand medical doctor and explorer.

Hudson was born in London, United Kingdom, and attended Devizes Grammar School. He became an apprentice to a doctor before completing his medical degree at the University of London in 1879.

After practising for two years in Kimberley, South Africa and serving as a surgeon during the Zulu war of 1879 he emigrated to New Zealand in 1880. He set up his medical practice in Nelson. He served on the Nelson City Council from 1901 resigning in 1905 when he was appointed district health officer for Nelson and Marlborough. He was medical officer to the Nelson and Stoke orphanages from 1902 to 1907.

In New Zealand lodges, or friendly societies, appointed doctors to provide medical services at reduced rates to members and their families. Hudson was dismissed by the lodge The Ancient Order of Foresters in 1896 because "he refused to reduced his rate below one pound per patient per annum". He was supported by the New Zealand Branch of the British Medical Association.

In 1907 Hudson retired to Tapawera but continued to practice medicine. He died in a car accident on the Spooner Range, south of Nelson on the road between Tapawera and Belgrove, on 8 July 1912 was buried in the churchyard at Stoke.

== Family ==
Hudson's father and siblings also emigrated to New Zealand in the 1880s. One of his brothers was the entomologist George Hudson.

He married Beatrix Jane Andrew, daughter of MP John Andrew, in Nelson in 1886. They had 11 children one of whom was engineer William Hudson. Another son, Athol, was killed at the Somme in World War I.
