= Alex McLeod (politician) =

New Zealand politician (1872–1938)

The Honourable Alex McLeod
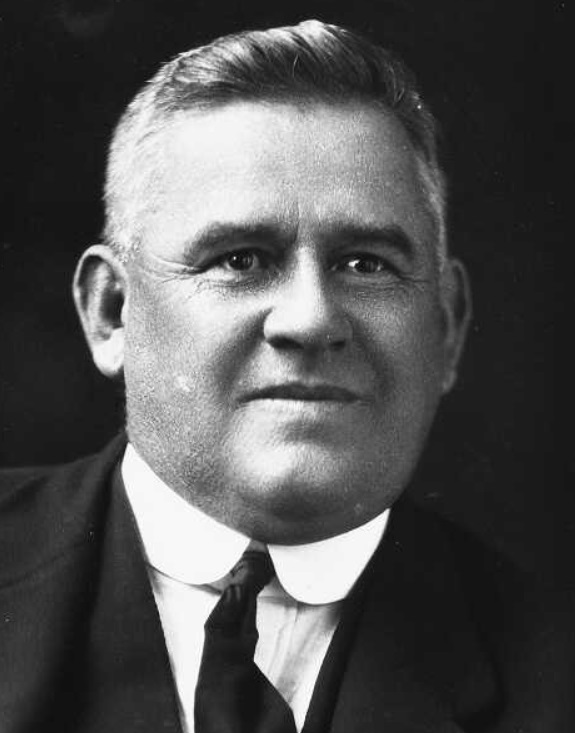
- McLeod in 1922

9th Minister of Industries and Commerce
- In office 24 May 1926 – 28 November 1928
- Prime Minister: Gordon Coates
- Preceded by: William Downie Stewart Jr
- Succeeded by: Alexander Young

26th Minister of Lands
- In office 25 June 1924 – 28 November 1928
- Prime Minister: William Massey; Francis Bell; Gordon Coates
- Preceded by: David Guthrie
- Succeeded by: Kenneth Williams

Member of the New Zealand Parliament for Wairarapa
- In office 2 December 1931 – 27 November 1935
- Preceded by: Thomas McDonald
- Succeeded by: Ben Roberts
- In office 17 December 1919 – 14 November 1928
- Preceded by: J. T. Marryat Hornsby
- Succeeded by: Thomas McDonald

Personal details
- Born: 13 July 1872 Wairarapa, New Zealand
- Died: 20 October 1938 (aged 66) Martinborough, New Zealand
- Party: Reform
- Profession: Farmer

Alexander Donald McLeod (13 July 1872 – 20 October 1938) was a Reform Party Member of Parliament in the Wairarapa region of New Zealand. He was Minister of Lands (1924–1928) and Industries and Commerce (1926–1928) in the Reform Government.

== Early life ==
McLeod was born in the Wairarapa in 1872. He was the third son of William McLeod, one of the pioneers of the district. He became an apprentice on his father's farm and afterwards ran his own sheep farm. He was elected onto the Featherston Road Board and, when it was formed in 1902, the Featherston County Council. He remained on the county council until 1919.

He had an adventurous streak in his youth and worked his way to travel to various countries around the world. This included a period in North America and while there took part in the Klondike Gold Rush.

== Member of Parliament ==
New Zealand Parliament
Years	Term	Electorate	Party
1919–1922	20th	Wairarapa	Reform
1922–1925	21st	Wairarapa	Reform
1925–1928	22nd	Wairarapa	Reform
1931–1935	24th	Wairarapa	Reform

McLeod won the Wairarapa electorate in the 1919 general election in a triangular contest, defeating the incumbent, J. T. Marryat Hornsby of the Liberal Party. He worked closely with Prime Minister William Massey while the latter was ill with cancer and was added to the cabinet as Minister of Lands in 1924. When Massey died in 1925 McLeod was one of several candidates named as a possible candidate to succeed Massey as party leader. During the caucus meeting which conducted the leadership ballot McLeod, having realised he had no realistic chance of winning, withdrew as a candidate. Ultimately Gordon Coates replaced Massey as leader. In a reshuffle in 1926 Coates additionally appointed McLeod as Minister of Industries and Commerce. McLeod promoted closer settlement of land and during his tenure in the lands portfolio there was a steady increase in the acreage of cultivated land. Critics of his thought the pace could have been increased. He also allotted public land to help with resettlement of World War I veterans. McLeod was the New Zealand government representative to Australia in May 1927 at the inauguration of the new Parliament House when the federal capital moved to Canberra. At the 1928 he was defeated by Thomas William McDonald of the United Party.

Just before the 1931 election, the United and Reform parties announced a coalition, following the collapse of an earlier coalition between United and Labour. Part of the agreement was that all sitting members who support the coalition would in turn receive the official endorsement as coalition candidate. This pragmatic decision caused trouble in those electorates where the voters were not satisfied with the incumbent's performance, for example in the Wairarapa and Otaki electorates. Local electorate committees were not supportive of McDonald and supported McLeod instead. Consequently, McLeod stood as a Coalition Independent or Independent Reform candidate in 1931 and won the election with a 7% margin of the votes. McLeod was a supporter of the coalition in the house.

Back in parliament he was critical of the creation of the new "anti-socialist" Democrat Party in 1934. He was particularly critical of the presence of big donor money being behind the party. He made a speech in parliament about it and, under parliamentary privilege, named wealthy businessman William Goodfellow as being the funder of the party. In 1935, McLeod was awarded the King George V Silver Jubilee Medal. He retired from politics in 1935.

== Later life ==
McLeod was a member of the Wellington Harbour Board (April 1919 – April 1921) and the Wairarapa member of the Wellington Hospital Board. He was a steward of the Wairarapa Racing Club.

McLeod died at his home at Martinborough on 20 October 1938, and was buried at Martinborough Cemetery. He was survived by his wife and children, his son Norman Murdoch McLeod having drowned while duck-shooting at Kahutara in 1936.

== Notes ==
New Zealand Parliament
Preceded by J. T. Marryat Hornsby	Member of Parliament for Wairarapa; 1919–1928 1931–1935	Succeeded by Thomas McDonald
Preceded by Thomas McDonald	Member of Parliament for Wairarapa; 1919–1928 1931–1935	Succeeded by Ben Roberts
Political offices
Preceded by William Downie Stewart Jr	Minister of Industries and Commerce; 1926–1928	Succeeded by Alexander Young
Preceded by David Guthrie	Minister of Lands; 1924–1928	Succeeded by Kenneth Williams
