= 1865 Wairarapa by-election =

New Zealand by-election

The 1865 Wairarapa by-election was a by-election held on 29 July in the Wairarapa electorate in the Wairarapa during the 6th New Zealand Parliament.

The by-election was caused by the resignation of the incumbent, Charles Carter, who had returned to England.

He was replaced by Henry Bunny.

== Results ==
The following table gives the election result:

1865 Wairarapa by-election
Party	Candidate	Votes	%	±%
Independent	Henry Bunny	105	55.56	
Independent	Edward Pearce	84	44.44	
Majority		21	11.11	
Turnout		189		
