= J. T. Marryat Hornsby =

New Zealand politician (1857–1921)

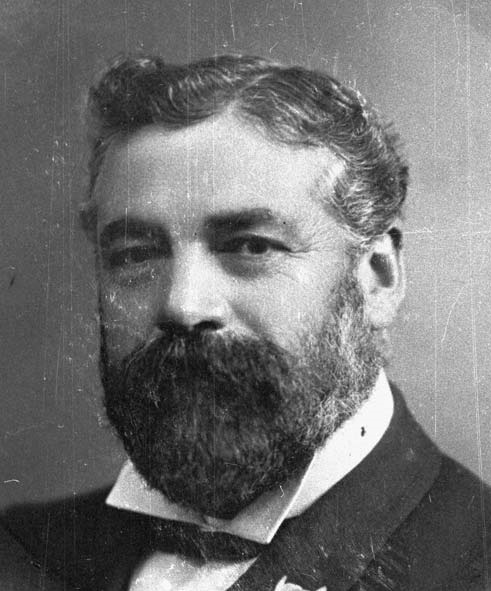

Member of the New Zealand Parliament for Wairarapa
- In office 10 December 1914 – 19 December 1919
- Preceded by: Wally Buchanan
- Succeeded by: Alex McLeod
- In office 6 December 1905 – 17 November 1908
- Preceded by: Wally Buchanan
- Succeeded by: Wally Buchanan
- In office 6 December 1899 – 25 November 1902
- Preceded by: Wally Buchanan
- Succeeded by: Wally Buchanan

Personal details
- Born: 13 March 1857 Hobart, Tasmania
- Died: 23 February 1921 (aged 63) Carterton, New Zealand
- Party: Liberal

John Thomas Marryat Hornsby (13 March 1857 – 23 February 1921), generally known as J. T. Marryat Hornsby, was a New Zealand politician of the Liberal Party from the Wairarapa. He was a newspaper editor and proprietor.

== Biography ==
=== Early life ===
Hornsby was born at Hobart, Tasmania in 1857. His family moved to Nelson in 1874 and when the other family members returned to Hobart, he remained in New Zealand.

=== Political career ===
New Zealand Parliament
Years	Term	Electorate	Party
1899–1902	14th	Wairarapa	Liberal
1905–1908	16th	Wairarapa	Liberal
1914–1919	19th	Wairarapa	Liberal

He was a Member of Parliament for the Wairarapa electorate in the 14th (1899–1902), 16th (1905–1908), and 19th (1914–1919) Parliaments.

He defeated Wally Buchanan (the Conservative sitting member from 1887) in 1899, but lost to him in 1902 and 1908. Buchanan was later the Reform Party candidate.

Hornsby was defeated in 1919 by Alex McLeod.

Hornsby died at Carterton in 1921.

== Notes ==
New Zealand Parliament
Preceded by Wally Buchanan	Member of Parliament for Wairarapa; 1899–1902; 1905–1908 1914–1919	Succeeded by Wally Buchanan
Preceded by Wally Buchanan	Member of Parliament for Wairarapa; 1899–1902; 1905–1908 1914–1919	Succeeded by Alex McLeod
