= William Hudson (engineer) =

New Zealand–Australian engineer (1896–1978)

Sir Bill Hudson KBE FRS
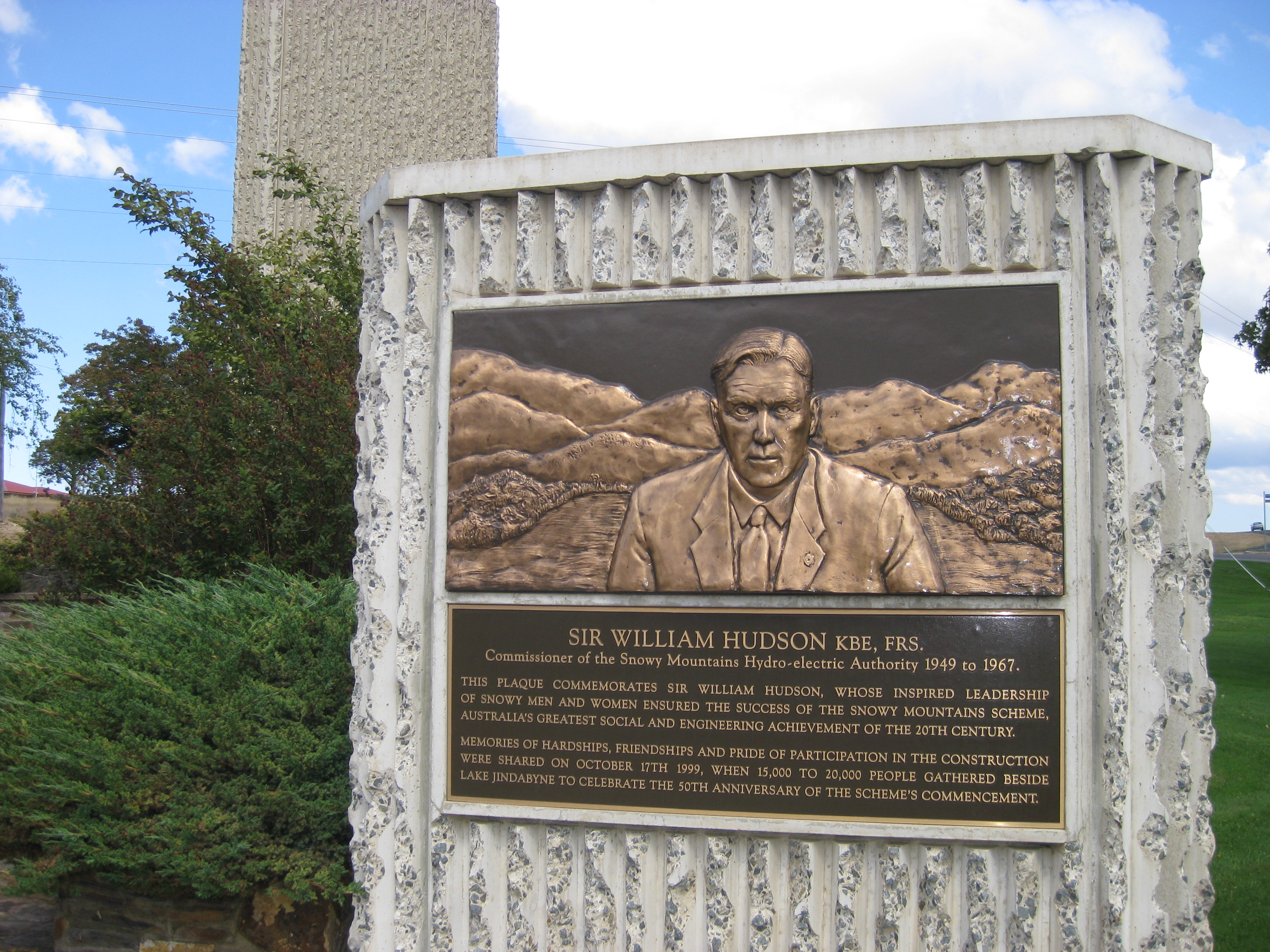
- Born: William Hudson; 27 April 1896; Nelson, New Zealand
- Died: 12 September 1978 (aged 82); Red Hill, Australian Capital Territory, Australia
- Known for: Snowy Mountains Scheme
- Awards: James Cook Medal (1966)
- Relatives: James Hudson (father); John Andrew (grandfather); Angus Taylor (grandson)

Sir William Hudson KBE FRS (27 April 1896 – 12 September 1978) was a New Zealand-born engineer who headed construction of the Snowy Mountains Scheme for hydroelectricity and irrigation in Australia from 1949 to 1967, when he reluctantly retired at 71. The scheme was completed in 1974, under budget and before time.

== Early life and family ==
Hudson was born in Nelson, New Zealand, the son of James Hudson and Beatrice Jane Andrew. His maternal grandfather was John Chapman Andrew and his maternal grandmother was Emma Fendall. He was educated at Nelson College from 1908 to 1914, the University of London and the University of Grenoble. During his time studying in London, he visited the site of an early attempt to put a tunnel under the river Severn, an endeavour undertaken by his ancestor William Fendall among others.

== Career ==
Hudson served with the British Army in France (for three years), worked for Armstrong Whitworth & Co, as assistant engineer on the Mangahao hydro-electric scheme, New Zealand (1922–1924), then as engineer-in-charge, Arapuni power station, New Zealand (1924–1927). He worked on further dams in New Zealand (1928–1930), was involved in Galloway hydro-electric scheme, Scotland (1931–1937), was resident engineer on the Woronora Dam, Sydney, Australia, and was chief construction engineer and engineer-in-chief at the Metropolitan Water, Sewerage and Drainage Board, Sydney.

In 1948, Hudson applied for the position of chairman of the Snowy Mountains Hydro-electricity Authority (SMHEA), which managed the Snowy Mountains Scheme. When the Cabinet met to consider the top three candidates, the minister responsible for the scheme, Nelson Lemmon, handed the Prime Minister Ben Chifley a note that simply read "Hudson, Hudson, Hudson!". He was appointed a Knight Commander of the Order of the British Empire (KBE) in the 1955 Queen's Birthday Honours, in recognition of his service as chairman of SMHEA. He was elected in March 1964 a Fellow of the Royal Society, and was awarded the James Cook Medal of the Royal Society of New South Wales in 1966.

Hudson retired in 1967 and was appointed president of the National Safety Council of Australia, and chairman of the Road Safety Council, New South Wales.
