= Charles Carter (New Zealand politician) =

New Zealand contractor, politician and philanthropist

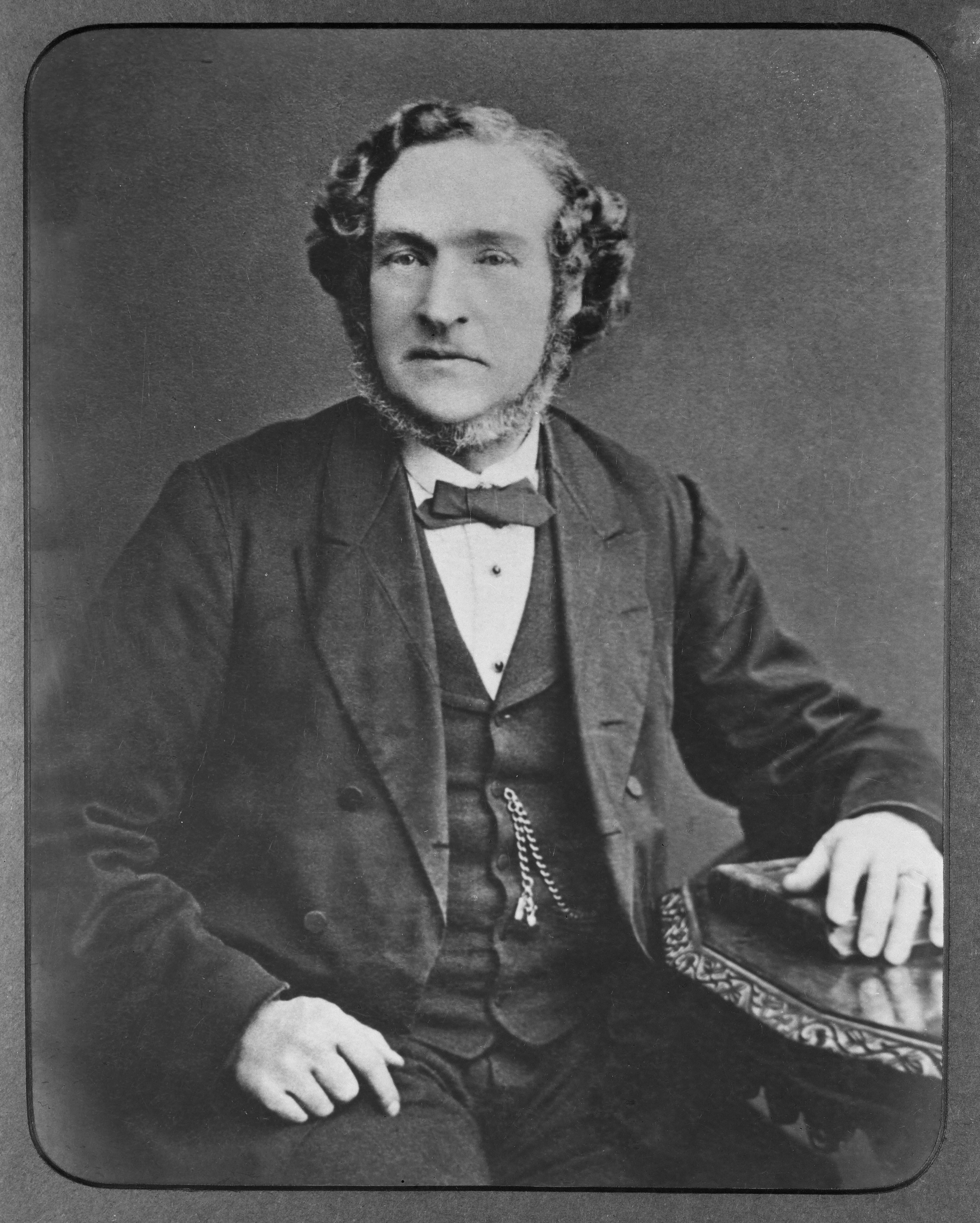
Charles Rooking Carter in ca 1872

Charles Rooking Carter (10 March 1822 – 22 July 1896) was a New Zealand contractor, politician, and philanthropist from England.

== Biography ==
New Zealand Parliament
Years	Term	Electorate	Party
1859–1860	2nd	Wairarapa	Independent
1860–1865	3rd	Wairarapa	Independent

Carter was born in Kendal, Westmorland, the son of a builder, John Carter. Carter lived in London from the age of 21 and through adult education classes at the Westminster Institution, broadened his knowledge and outlook. His studies led him to advocate emigration and, in particular, emigration to New Zealand, as one means of relieving distress. Following his marriage to Jane Robieson in 1850, he left for New Zealand with his wife. In Wellington he quickly made a position for himself as a resourceful and enterprising contractor, among the works which he completed being harbour reclamation, seawalls, and the Wellington Provincial Buildings (1857).

In 1853 he was elected to the committee of the Wairarapa Small Farms Association, an organisation responsible for the settlement of Greytown and Masterton. In 1867 his suggestion that the unsold lands should be used for educational purposes within the district led directly to the establishment of the Greytown and Masterton land trusts. Carter represented the Wairarapa in the Wellington Provincial Council from 1857 to 1864, and in the General Assembly (for Wairarapa) from 1859 to 1865. The settlement was named in his honour 'Carterville', these days called Carterton.

Carter's business success permitted his early return to England in 1863 for a four-year interval and again for most of the latter part of his life. Between 1857 and 1863, by a series of purchases of small holdings, he had formed the East Taratahi or Parkvale estates. While overseas he kept in touch with Carterton, and his direct assistance to the borough library made it, by the mid-1880s, probably the best in the country outside the main centres.

Carter died at Wellington on 22 July 1896, and was buried at Clareville Cemetery in Carterton. He bequeathed a significant book and pamphlet collection to The New Zealand Institute, and the residue of his estate went towards the erection of an astronomical observatory for Wellington – the Carter Observatory.

== Publications ==
- Victoria, the British "El Dorado" : Or: Melbourne in 1869 ; Shewing the ... (1870)

== Notes ==
New Zealand Parliament
New constituency	Member of Parliament for Wairarapa; 1859–1865	Succeeded by Henry Bunny
