= Charles Harrington Broad =

New Zealand cricketer

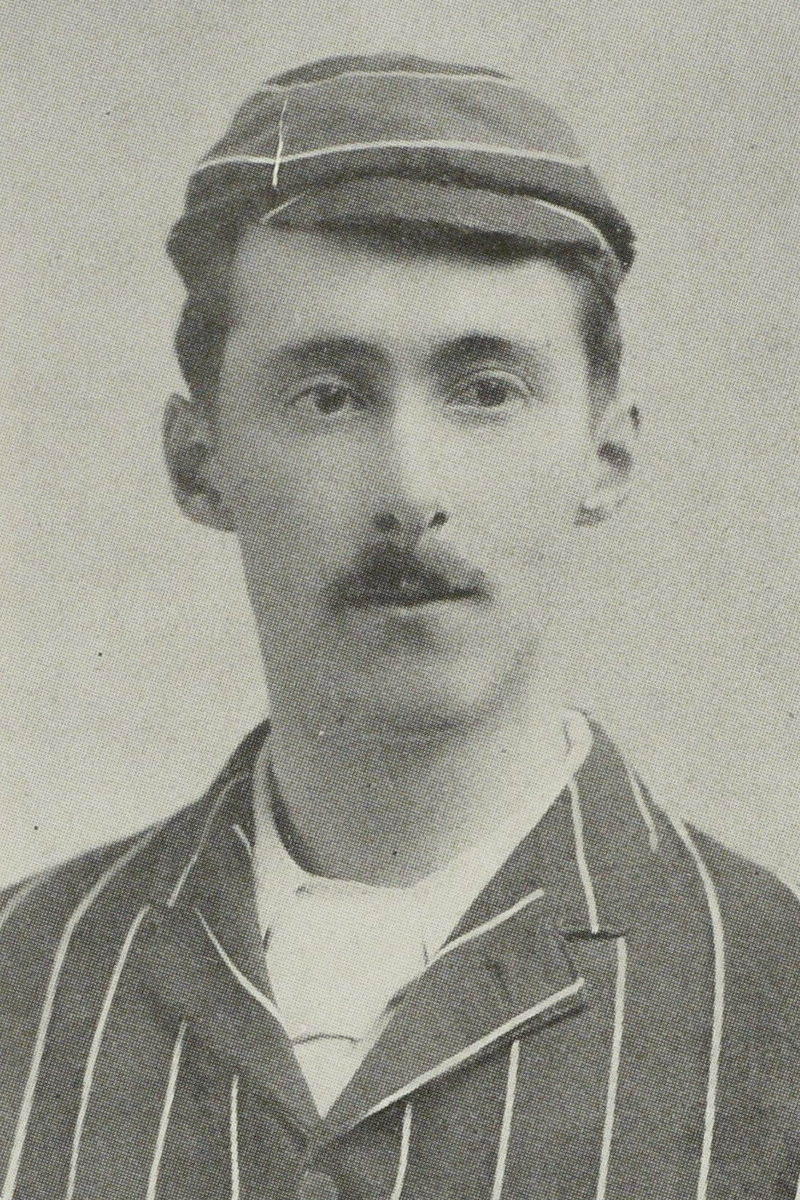

12th Headmaster of Nelson College
- In office 1922–1933
- Preceded by: Harry Lewis Fowler
- Succeeded by: Herbert Victor Searle

Personal details
- Born: 5 October 1872 Nelson, New Zealand
- Died: 7 September 1959 (aged 86) Nelson, New Zealand
- Spouse: Annie Maria Murray (m. 1905)
- Relations: Edward Broad (brother); Charles Broad (uncle); Henry Bunny (grandfather)
- Cricket career

Cricket information
- Batting: Right-handed

Domestic team information
- Years: Team
- 1888/89–1891/92: Nelson
- 1897/98–1899/00: Otago
- FC debut: 28 December 1888 Nelson v Wellington
- Last FC: 4 January 1900 Otago v Canterbury

Career statistics
| Competition | First-class |
|---|---|
| Matches | 8 |
| Runs scored | 151 |
| Batting average | 10.06 |
| 100s/50s | 0/1 |
| Top score | 60 |
| Balls bowled | 83 |
| Wickets | 2 |
| Bowling average | 32.00 |
| 5 wickets in innings | 0 |
| 10 wickets in match | 0 |
| Best bowling | 2/13 |
| Catches/stumpings | 4/– |
- Source: CricketArchive, 1 February 2016

Rugby union career
- Position(s): Fullback; Three-quarter; Five-eighth
Provincial / State sides
| Years | Team | Apps | (Points) |
| 1894–1895 | Nelson | 3 | (0) |

Charles Harrington Broad (5 October 1872 – 7 September 1959) was a New Zealand cricketer, rugby union player, and school teacher. He played eight first-class cricket matches for Nelson and Otago between 1888 and 1900, three representative games for the Nelson rugby team in 1894 and 1895, and was headmaster of Nelson College from 1922 to 1933.

== Early life and family ==
Broad was born at Nelson on 5 October 1872. His father was Lowther Broad, the Nelson resident magistrate and younger brother of Charles Broad, and his mother was Isabella Mary Broad (née Bunny), the daughter of Henry Bunny.

Broad was educated at Nelson College from 1884 to 1892. The latter years of that period were as an extramural student studying for a Bachelor of Arts, and he graduated from Auckland University College in 1893. Broad married Annie Maria Murray at Hokitika on 8 May 1905.

== Cricket ==
In all, Broad played eight first-class cricket matches.

=== Nelson ===
Broad made his first-class debut for Nelson, against Wellington at the Basin Reserve, in the 1888–89 season. Batting at number four in the first innings and number nine in the second, he made an inauspicious start to his first-class career, making a pair. He bowled seven overs for 26 runs, and did not take a wicket. Nelson lost the match by an innings and 190 runs.

His second and last first-class appearance for Nelson, also against Wellington, was in the 1891–92 season at Trafalgar Park. Opening the batting in the first innings, Broad made one run, and in the second innings, batting at three, he scored 12 runs. He did not bowl in Wellington's first innings, but in their second he took two wickets for 13 runs off 3.2 overs. Wellington won the match by one wicket. The wicketkeeper for Nelson in the match was Broad's younger brother, Edward.

In the 1894–95 season, Broad played for Nelson against the touring Fijian team. Opening the batting in each innings, he scored 17 and 80 runs, respectively. He took one wicket in each innings, bowling one over in the first and four in the second. Despite his efforts, Fiji won the two-day match by three wickets.

Broad made a final appearance for Nelson, playing against Lord Hawke's XI at Trafalgar Park in January 1903. He made 4 (stumped Taylor, bowled Hargreave) and 7 not out in Nelson's two turns at bat. The tourists won the match by an innings and 79 runs, despite the home team playing with 18 men.

For several years, Broad was the captain of the Nelson College cricket club.

=== Otago ===
Broad made six first-class appearances for Otago between 1898 and 1900: one in each of the 1897–98 and 1898–99 seasons; and four in the 1899–1900 season.

Against Canterbury at Lancaster Park in 1897–98, he scored 5 and 7 runs, respectively, in Otago's two innings, and bowled 1.3 overs without success in Canterbury's second innings.

The following season against Canterbury at Carisbrook, Broad made 12 and 17 runs batting at four, and was not called upon to bowl. He contributed in the field, taking two catches in Canterbury's first innings and one in their second. Later in the 1898–99 season, Broad played for Otago against the New Zealand team selected to tour Australia. In that two-day match at Carisbrook, with 13 players per side, he scored 11 runs in the first innings, and did not bat in the second.

In his final first-class season for Otago, 1899–1900, Broad scored a total of 98 runs, with a high-score of 60 batting at number seven against Hawke's Bay, at an average of 14.00. During the season, he bowled just 12 deliveries in first-class games, without taking a wicket.

During his time in Dunedin from 1897 to 1901, Broad belonged to the Carisbrook cricket club.

== Rugby union ==
Broad made three appearances for the Nelson provincial rugby union team between 1894 and 1895. In his first match, against South Canterbury at Trafalgar Park on 30 July 1894, Broad played at fullback. It was reported that "he had little to do, but was equal to every emergency" in Nelson's 8–0 victory. Broad played in the three-quarter line against the touring New South Wales team at Trafalgar Park later that season on 22 September, in a match that attracted 2000 spectators, the largest attendance seen in Nelson for a rugby match up to that time. The home team was defeated 4–13, and Broad's performance was described as being "below club form". The following season, Broad played at five-eighth against Auckland at Trafalgar Park on 2 September 1895. He missed his one attempted conversion as Nelson lost the match 3–9.

== Tennis ==
A member of the Otago tennis club, Broad was the Otago provincial tennis champion in 1901.

== Teaching career ==
In 1893 Broad was appointed junior master at Nelson College, with a salary of £50 per year plus board and residence. At Easter 1897 he took up a post as an assistant master at Otago Boys' High School. He returned to Nelson College as third master in 1901, and remained there for the rest of his teaching career. Following the retirement of Harry Lewis Fowler as headmaster of Nelson College after a 17-year tenure, Broad was appointed as his replacement, and was the first old boy of the school to be given the role.

Broad was headmaster of Nelson College for 11 years. In 1927 he visited the United Kingdom with his wife, and saw how secondary schools were organised there. When he returned to Nelson, he put into practice some of what he had observed, particularly the house system, which still continues. The latter years of Broad's tenure were dominated by the effects of the damaging 1929 Murchison earthquake. Three new boarding houses were planned: the new Rutherford and Barnicoat Houses were completed in 1931, and Fell House was temporarily located in nearby Fairfield House. Broad gained extra responsibilities in 1932 as the daytime operations of the Nelson Technical School were merged into Nelson College. He retired as headmaster at the end of 1933, having been at the school for all but five years since 1884.

Broad also served on the Nelson College Old Boys' Association. He was secretary from 1906 to 1912 and president between 1921 and 1928. He was involved in the purchase in 1927 of five acres (2.0 hectares) of land between Vanguard and Tipahi Streets for additional college playing fields, that were later named "Broad's" in his honour.

== Later life ==
Following his retirement, Broad continued to live in Nelson, and he died there on 7 September 1959. His wife, Annie Maria Broad, died on 26 April 1965.
