= Mayor of Featherston =

The mayor of Featherston officiated over the Featherston Borough of New Zealand, which was administered by the Featherston Borough Council. The office existed from 1917 until 1989, when Featherston Borough was amalgamated into the South Wairarapa District Council as part of the 1989 local government reforms.

== List of mayors ==
	Name	Term
1	John Wiltshire Card	1917–1947
2	F. White	1947–1950
3	T.G. Hardie	1950–1956
4	A.D. Johnston	1956–1959
(3)	T.G. Hardie	1959–1962
5	J.W. Johnson	1962–1968
6	David Flynn	1968–1974
7	William McKerrow	1974–1989
