= Charles Broad (magistrate) =

Charles Broad (23 September 1828 – 12 November 1879) was a New Zealand goldfields administrator and magistrate. He was born in London, England, on 23 September 1828. He was an uncle to Charles Harrington Broad.
