= List of New Zealand Liberal Party MPs =

The following is a list of members of the New Zealand Liberal Party who served in the New Zealand House of Representatives. The New Zealand Liberal Party was formalised in 1891 but had existed informally since the lead up to the 1890 general election. All members are listed up until the founding of the New Zealand National Party in 1936. From 1922 onwards the Liberal party received several cosmetic name changes; Progressive Liberal Labour Party (1922), "National" Party (1925) and finally United Party (1928). Only the final name change was successful. United MPs are included in this list.

Name	Portrait	First Elected / Joined Party	Electorates	Left Party / Parliament	Notes
John Ballance		1890*	Wanganui (1890–1893)	1893†	Prime Minister 1891–93
Edwin Blake		1890*	Avon (1890–1893)	1893	
Alfred Cadman		1890*	Thames (1890–1893); Auckland (1893); Waikato (1893–1896); Ohinemuri (1896–1899)	1899	
Tom Duncan		1890*	Oamaru (1890–1911)	1911	
Henry Fish		1890*	Dunedin (1890–1893)	1893	Left party
George Fisher		1890*	Wellington (1890–1893); Wellington (1896–1905)	1905†	
David Goldie		1890*	Newton (1890–1891)	1891	Resigned
Arthur Guinness		1890*	Grey (1890–1913)	1913†	
William Hall-Jones		1890*	Timaru (1890–1908)	1908	Prime Minister 1906
John Joyce		1890*	Akaroa (1890–1893); Lyttelton (1893–1899)	1899	
William Kelly		1890*	East Coast (1890–1893); Bay of Plenty (1893–1896)	1896	
John McKenzie		1890*	Waitaki (1890–1893); Waihemo (1893–1900)	1900	
Tame Parata		1890*	Southern Maori (1890–1911)	1911	
Westby Perceval		1890*	Chriustchurch (1890–1891)	1891	Resigned
Richard Reeves		1890*	Inangahua (1890–1893)	1893	Resigned
William Pember Reeves		1890*	Christchurch (1890–1896)	1896	Resigned
Richard Seddon		1890*	Westland (1890–1906)	1906†	Prime Minister 1893–1906
William Smith		1890*	Waipawa (1890–1893)	1893	
William Steward		1890*	Waimate (1890–1893); Waitaki (1893–1911)	1911	
William Walker		1890*	Ashburton (1890)	1890	
Joseph Ward		1890*	Awarua (1890–1919); Invercargill (1925–1930)	1930†	Prime Minister 1906–12 & 1928–30
Lindsay Buick		1890	Wairau (1890–1896)	1896	
Walter Carncross		1890	Taieri (1890–1902)	1902	
William Dawson		1890	Dunedin (1890–1893)	1893	
William Earnshaw		1890	Peninsula (1890–1893); Dunedin (1893–1896)	1896	Lib-Lab
Alexander Hogg		1890	Masterton (1890–1911)	1911	
Robert Houston		1890	Bay of Islands (1890–1908)	1908	
William Hutchison		1890	Dunedin (1890–1896)	1896	
James Kelly		1890	Invercargill (1890–1899)	1899	Lib-Lab
Kennedy Macdonald		1890	Wellington (1890–1893)	1893	
James Mackintosh		1890	Wallace (1890–1896)	1896	
Richard Meredith		1890	Ashley (1890–1902)	1902	
Charlie Mills		1890	Waimea (1890–1896); Wairau (1896–1908)	1908	
Jackson Palmer		1890	Waitemata (1890–1893); Ohinemuri (1899–1902)	1902	Independent Liberal
David Pinkerton		1890	Dunedin (1890–1896)	1896	
William Rees		1890	Auckland (1890–1893)	1893	
John Shera		1890	Auckland (1890–1893)	1893	
Edward Smith		1890	New Plymouth (1890–1896); Taranaki (1899–1907)	1907†	
William Tanner		1890	Heathcote (1890–1893); Avon (1893–1908)	1908	Lib-Lab
Thomas Thompson		1890	Auckland (1890–1893); Auckland (1895–1899)	1899	
Frank Lawry		1891	Parnell (1891–1911)	1911	
William Fraser		1891	Te Aroha (1891–1893)	1893	First elected in by-election
Ebenezer Sandford		1891	Christchurch (1891–1893)	1893	Lib-Lab, First elected in by-election
William McLean		1892	Wellington (1892–1893)	1893	First elected in by-election
Robert Stout		1893	Inangahua (1893); Wellington (1893–1896)	1896	Independent 1896–98
Archibald Willis		1893	Wanganui (1893–1896); Wanganui (1899–1905)	1905	First elected in by-election
James McGowan		1893	Thames (1893–1909)	1909	First elected in by-election
John McLachlan		1893	Ashburton (1893–1896); Ashburton (1899–1908)	1908	
William Crowther		1893	Auckland (1893–1896)	1896	Independent 1896–1900
Roderick McKenzie		1893	Buller (1893–1896); Moutueka (1896–1914)	1914	
Arthur Morrison		1893	Caversham (1893–1901)	1901†	
John A. Millar		1893	Chalmers (1893–1896); Dunedin (1896–1905); Dunedin Central (1905–1908); Dunedin West (1908–1914)	1914	
William Collins		1893	Christchurch (1893–1896); Christchurch (1899–1902)	1902	
William Montgomery		1893	Ellesmere (1893–1899)	1899	
Benjamin Harris		1893	Franklin (1893–1896)	1896	
Patrick O'Regan		1893	Inangahua (1893–1896); Buller (1896–1899)	1899	
David Buddo		1893	Kaiapoi (1893–1896); Kaiapoi (1899–1919); Kaiapoi (1922–1928)	1928	
Maurice O'Rorke		1893	Manakau (1893–1902)	1902	
Robert Thompson			Maresden (1893–1896)		Independent (1896–1902)
Robert McNab		1893	Matarua (1893–1896); Matarua (1898–1908); Hawke's Bay (1914–1917)	1917†	
Samuel Carnell		1893	Napier (1893–1896)	1896	
John Graham		1893	Nelson (1893–1911)	1911	
Frederick Pirani		1893	Palmerston (1893–1899)	1899	Independent (1899–1902)
William Maslin		1893	Rangitata (1893–1896)	1896	
Frederick Flatman		1893	Pareora (1893–1896); Geraldine (1896–1908)	1908	
John Stevens		1893	Rangitikei (1893–1896); Manawatu (1896–1902); Manawatu (1905–1908)	1908	
George Warren Russell		1893	Riccarton (1893–1896); Riccarton (1899–1902); Avon (1908–1919)	1919	Deputy leader (1917–1919)
Vincent Pyke		1893	Tuapeka (1893–1894)	1894†	
James Carroll		1893	Waiapu (1893–1908); Gisborne (1908–1919)	1919	
Charles Hall		1893	Waipawa (1893–1896); Waipawa (1899–1911)	1911	
Wi Pere		1893	Eastern Maori (1893–1905)	1905	
Hone Heke Ngapua		1893	Northern Maori (1893–1900); Northern Maori (1901–1909)	1909†	
William Larnach		1894	Tuapeka (1894–1898)	1898†	
James Holland		1896	Auckland (1893–1896)	1893	
Walter Symes		1896	Egmont (1896–1902); Patea (1902–1908)	1908	
Henry Field		1896	Otaki (1896–1899)	1899†	
John O'Meara		1896	Paihiatua (1896–1904)	1904†	
John Hutcheson		1896	Wellington (1896–1902)	1902	Lib-Lab
Edmund Allen		1896	Waikouaiti (1896–1902); Chalmers (1902–1908)	1908	
Michael Gilfedder		1896	Wallace (1896–1902)	1902	
Thomas Wilford		1896	Wellington Suburbs (1896–1897); Wellington Suburbs (1899–1902); Hutt (1902–1929)	1929	Leader of the Opposition (1920–1925)
Charles Wilson		1897	Wellington Suburbs (1897–1899)	1899	First elected in by-election
William Napier		1899	Auckland (1899–1902)	1902	
James Arnold		1899	Dunedin (1899–1905); Dunedin South (1905–1908); Dunedin Central (1908–1911)	1911	Lib-Lab
James Colvin		1899	Buller (1899–1919)	1919	
Harry Ell		1899	Christchurch (1899–1905); Christchurch South (1905–1919)	1919	New Liberal MP 1905
Alfred Barclay		1899	Dunedin (1899–1902); Dunedin North (1905–1908)	1908	
Josiah Hanan		1899	Invercargill (1899–1925)	1925	
George Laurenson		1899	Lyttelton (1899–1913)	1913†	New Liberal MP 1905
Alfred Fraser		1899	Napier (1899–1908)	1908	
James Bennet		1899	Tuapeka (1899–1908)	1908†	
J. T. Marryat Hornsby		1899	Wairarapa (1899–1902); Wairarapa (1905–1908); Wairarapa (1914–1919)	1914	
William Field		1900	Otaki (1900–1908)	1908	First elected in by-election, Reform MP 1909–11, 1914–1935
Joseph Witheford		1900	Auckland (1900–1905)	1905	First elected in by-election
Thomas Sidey		1901	Caversham (1901–1908); Dunedin South (1908–1928)	1928	First elected in by-election
Thomas Mackenzie		1902	Waikouaiti (1902–1908); Taieri (1908–1911); Egmont (1911–1912)	1912	Prime Minister 1912, previously independent, resigned
Alfred Kidd		1902	Auckland (1902–1905); Auckland Central (1905–1908)	1908	
Frederick Baume		1902	Auckland (1902–1905); Auckland East (1905–1910)	1910†	
William Barber		1902	Newtown (1902–1908)	1908	
Harry Bedford		1902	Dunedin (1902–1905)	1905	New Liberal MP 1905
William Thomas Jennings		1902	Egmont (1902–1908); Taumaranui (1908–1911); Taumaranui (1914–1919); Waitomo (1919–1922)	1922	Re-elected in by-election (1915)
Thomas Davey		1902	Christchurch (1902–1905); Christchurch East (1905–1914)	1914	
Tommy Taylor		1902	Christchurch (1902–1905)	1905	New Liberal MP 1905, Lib-Lab MP (Christchurch North) 1908–1911
Charles Major		1902	Hawera (1902–1908)	1908	
Andrew Rutherford		1902	Hurunui (1902–1908)	1908	
Edward Moss		1902	Ohinemuri (1902–1905)	1905	Independent Liberal
William Wood		1902	Palmerston North (1902–1908)	1908	
Arthur Remington		1902	Rangitikei (1902–1909)	1909†	
George Witty		1902	Riccarton (1902–1925)	1925	Independent Liberal (1922–25)
John Thomson		1902	Wallace (1902–1919); Wallace (1922–1925)	1925	
Bill Hawkins		1904	Pahiatua (1904–1905)	1905	First elected in by-election
Francis Fisher		1905	Wellington (1905)	1905	First elected in by-election, New Liberal MP (Wellington Central, 1905–08), Independent (1908–10), Reform MP (1910–14)
James Hogan		1905	Wanganui (1905–1911)	1911	Lib-Lab, Independent MP (Rangetiki) 1928–31
Charles Hayward Izard		1905	Wellington North (1905–1908)	1908	
Āpirana Ngata		1905	Eastern Maori (1905–1936)	1936	
Charles Poole		1905	Auckland West (1905–1911); Auckland West (1914–1919)	1919	
Alfred Dillon		1905	Hawke's Bay (1905–1911)	1911	
John Stallworthy		1905	Kaipara (1905–1911)	1911	
John Andrew MacPherson		1905	Mount Ida (1905–1908); Oamaru (1922–1925); Oamaru (1928–1935)	1935	
Hugh Poland		1905	Ohinemuri (1905–1925)	1925	Independent Liberal from 1919
Robert Beatson Ross		1905	Pahiatua (1905–1911)	1911	Lib-Lab
Henry Greenslade		1905	Waikato (1905–1911)	1911	
Charles Gray		1905	Christchurch North (1905–1908)	1908	Independent Liberal
Tom Seddon		1906	Westland (1906–1922); Westland (1925–1928)	1928	Son of previous MP, First elected in by-election
William Chapple		1908	Tuapeka (1908)	1908	First elected in by-election
Albert Glover		1908	Auckland Central (1908–1919)	1919	
Vernon Reed		1908	Bay of Islands (1908–1912)	1912	Reform MP 1912–22
William MacDonald		1908	Bay of Plenty (1908–1920)	1920†	Leader of the Opposition (1919–20)
Edward Henry Clark		1908	Chalmers (1908–1911)	1914	Independent Liberal
Thomas Buxton		1908	Geraldine (1908–11); Temuka (1911–14)	1914	
George Forbes		1908	Hurunui (1908–1936)	1936	Leader (1925–28), Prime Minister (1930–35)
Vigor Brown		1908	Napier (1908–1920)	1920	Reform MP (1920–22)
John Luke		1908	Wellington Suburbs (1908–1911)	1911	Reform MP (1918–1928)
Edmund Taylor		1909	Thames (1909–11)	1911	First elected in by-election
Te Rangi Hiroa		1909	Northern Maori (1909–14)	1914	First elected in by-election
Robbie Smith		1909	Rangiteki (1909–1911); Waimarino (1911–1922); Waimarino (1925–1928)	1928	First elected in by-election
Arthur Myers		1910	Auckland East (1910–21)	1921	First elected in by-election
Leonard Isitt		1911	Christchurch North (1911–25)	1925	First elected in by-election
William Dickie		1911	Selwyn (1911–1919)	1919	
Thomas Rhodes		1911	Thames (1911–1915)	1915	Reform MP 1915–28
Richard McCallum		1911	Wairau (1911–1922)	1922	
Taare Parata		1911	Southern Maori (1911–1918)	1918†	
Henry Thacker		1914	Christchurch East (1914–1922)	1922	
Robert Fletcher		1914	Wellington Central (1914–1918)	1918†	
John Anstey		1914	Waitaki (1914–1919)	1919	
Charles Talbot		1914	Temuka (1914–1919)	1919	
John Findlay		1917	Hawkes Bay (1917–1919)	1919	First elected in by-election
Robert Masters		1919	Stratford (1919–1925)	1925	
Sydney Smith		1919	Taranaki (1919–1925); New Plymouth (1928–36)	1936	Lib-Lab (1919–22)
James Horn		1919	Wakatipu (1919–1928)	1928	
George Mitchell		1919	Wellington South (1919–1922)	1922	Independent Liberal
John Edie		1920	Bruce (1920–1922); Clutha (1922–25)	1925	First elected in by-election
Philip De La Perrelle		1922	Awarua (1922–1925), (1928–35)	1935	
Gilbert McKay		1922	Hawkes Bay (1922–1925)	1925	
Alfred Murdoch		1922	Marsden (1922–1925), (1928–35)	1935	
Alfred Ransom		1922	Paihiatua (1922–1936)	1936	
James Corrigan		1922	Patea (1922–1925)	1925	
Frederick Lye			Waikato (1922–1925), (1928–35)		
James Donald		1928	Auckland East (1928–1931)	1931	
William Bodkin		1928	Otago Central (1928–1936)	1936	
William Taverner		1928	Dunedin South (1928–1931)	1931	
Arthur Stallworthy		1928	(–)	1935	Changed allegiance to Democrat 1935
John Fletcher		1928	Grey Lynn (1928–1930)	1930	Independent MP, 1930–31
Richard Hawke		1928	Kaiapoi (1928–1935)	1935	
David McDougall		1928	Matarua (1928–1933)	1933	Independent MP, 1933–38
George Black		1928	Motueka (1928–1931)	1931	Independent MP, 1931–32†
John Cobbe		1928	Oroua (1928–1936)	1936	
Harry Jenkins		1928	Parnell (1928–1930)	1930	Independent MP, 1930
George Munns		1928	Roskill (1928–1936)	1931	
Cecil Clinkard		1928	Rotorua (1928–1935)	1935	
Thomas McDonald		1928	Wairarapa (1928–1931)	1931	
Edward Healy		1928	Wairau (1928–1935)	1931	
Walter Broadfoot		1928	Waitomo (1928–1936)	1936	
Tuiti Makitanara		1928	Southern Maori (1928–1932)	1932†	
Vincent Ward		1930	Invercargill (1930–1931)	1931	First elected in by-election
Albert Jull		1930	Waipawa (1930–1935)	1935	First elected in by-election
Jeremiah Connolly		1931	Mid-Canterbury (1931–1935)	1935	Independent Liberal

== Notes ==
†:Died in office

== Sources ==
- Appendices to the Journals of the House of Representatives, H33 and/or E9, various years. E9's since 1994 are available here.
