= 14th New Zealand Parliament =

Term of the Parliament of New Zealand

14th Parliament of New Zealand
←	13th Parliament	15th Parliament	→
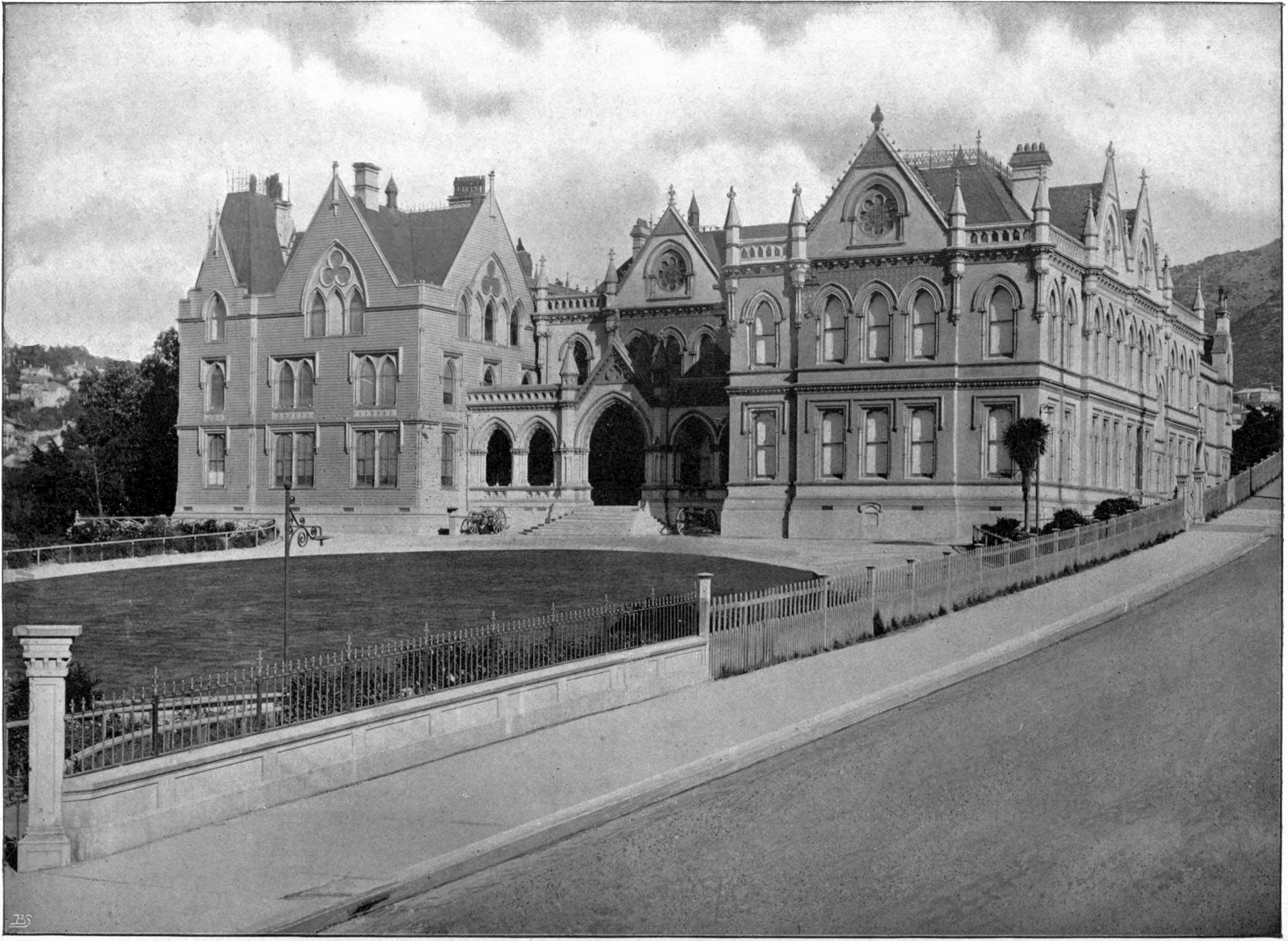

Overview
- Legislative body: New Zealand Parliament
- Term: 21 June 1900 – 3 October 1902
- Election: 1899 New Zealand general election
- Government: Liberal Government

House of Representatives
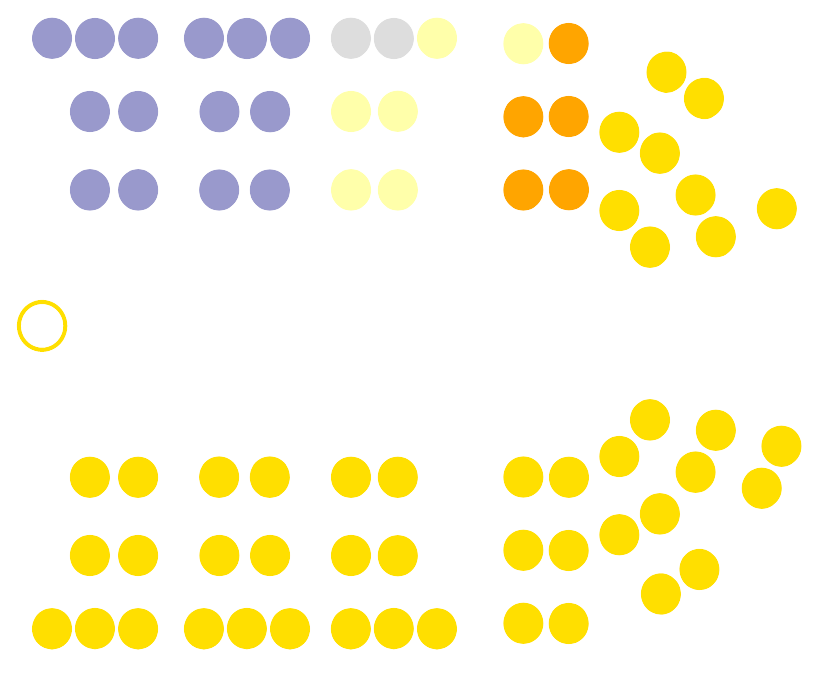
- Members: 74
- Speaker of the House: Maurice O'Rorke
- Premier: Richard Seddon
- Leader of the Opposition: William Russell

Legislative Council
- Members: 45 (at start); 42 (at end)
- Speaker of the Council: Henry Miller

Sovereign
- Monarch: HM Edward VII — HM Victoria until 22 January 1901
- Governor: HE Rt. Hon. The Earl of Ranfurly

The 14th New Zealand Parliament was a term of the New Zealand Parliament. It was elected at the 1899 general election in December of that year.

== 1899 general election ==
The 1899 general election was held on Wednesday, 6 December in the general electorates and on Tuesday, 19 December in the Māori electorates, respectively. The last electoral redistribution was undertaken in 1896 for the 1896 election, and the same electorates were used again. A total of 74 MPs were elected; 34 represented North Island electorates, 36 represented South Island electorates, and the remaining four represented Māori electorates. 373,744 voters were enrolled and the official turnout at the election was 77.6%.

== Sessions ==
The 14th Parliament sat for three sessions, and was prorogued on 5 November 1902.

Session	Opened	Adjourned
first	21 June 1900	21 October 1900
second	1 July 1901	8 November 1901
third	1 July 1902	3 October 1902

== Overview of seats ==
Affiliation	Members	
Affiliation	At 1899 election	At dissolution
Liberal	46	47
Liberal–Labour	5	5
Government total	51	52
Conservative	16	14
Independent Liberal	5	6
Independent	2	2
Opposition total	23	22
Total	74	74
Working government majority	28	30

== Ministries ==
The Liberal Government of New Zealand had taken office on 24 January 1891. The Seddon Ministry under Richard Seddon had taken office in 1893 during the term of the 11th Parliament. The Seddon Ministry remained in power for the whole term of this Parliament and held power until Seddon's death on 10 June 1906.

== Initial composition of the 14th Parliament ==
The table below show the results of the 1899 general election:

Key

Liberal Conservative Independent Liberal Liberal–Labour Independent

Electorate results for the 1899 New Zealand general election
Electorate	Incumbent	Winner	Majority	Runner up
General electorates
Ashburton	Edward George Wright	John McLachlan	802	Charles John Harper
Ashley	Richard Meredith		751	Thomas Caverhill
Auckland, City of	Thomas Thompson	William Joseph Napier	1,440	James Job Holland
Auckland, City of	James Job Holland	William Crowther	938	James Job Holland
Auckland, City of	William Crowther	George Fowlds	94	James Job Holland
Avon	William Tanner		148	Arthur Rhodes
Awarua	Joseph Ward		1,732	W. T. Murray
Bay of Islands	Robert Houston		67	Norman Alexander McLeod
Bay of Plenty	William Herries		132	David Lundon
Bruce	James Allen		364	Crawford Anderson
Buller	Patrick O'Regan	James Colvin	552	Patrick O'Regan
Caversham	Arthur Morrison		1,108	William Henry Warren
Christchurch, City of	Charles Lewis	William Whitehouse Collins	1,760	Tommy Taylor
Christchurch, City of	George Smith	Charles Lewis	418	Tommy Taylor
Christchurch, City of	Tommy Taylor	Harry Ell	221	Tommy Taylor
Clutha	James William Thomson		497	Finlay McLeod
Dunedin, City of	Alexander Sligo	John A. Millar	2,319	Scobie Mackenzie
Dunedin, City of	John A. Millar	James Arnold	1,564	Scobie Mackenzie
Dunedin, City of	Scobie Mackenzie	Alfred Richard Barclay	637	Scobie Mackenzie
Eden	John Bollard		4	Malcolm Niccol
Egmont	Walter Symes		268	William Monkhouse
Ellesmere	William Montgomery	Heaton Rhodes	104	William Montgomery
Franklin	William Massey		1,180	W Findlay Wilson
Geraldine	Frederick Flatman		1,556	Charles Nicholson McIntosh
Grey	Arthur Guinness		786	Michael Hannan
Hawera	Felix McGuire		55	Charles E. Major
Hawke's Bay	William Russell		Uncontested	
Invercargill	James Kelly	Josiah Hanan	4,640	James Kelly
Kaiapoi	Richard Moore	David Buddo	481	Richard Moore
Lyttelton	John Joyce	George Laurenson	1,813	William Jacques
Manawatu	John Stevens		148	Robert Bruce
Manukau	Maurice O'Rorke		1,031	John Edward Taylor
Marsden	Robert Thompson		1,314	George Alderton
Masterton	Alexander Hogg		1,191	Charles Cockburn-Hood
Mataura	Robert McNab		159	Irven Willis Raymond
Motueka	Roderick McKenzie		1,066	Walter Moffatt
Napier	Douglas Maclean	Alfred Fraser	38	Douglas Maclean
City of Nelson	John Graham		581	Richmond Hursthouse
Oamaru	Thomas Young Duncan		1,254	John Andrew MacPherson
Ohinemuri	Alfred Cadman	Jackson Palmer	295	Edward Moss
Otaki	Henry Field		305	Charles Morison
Pahiatua	John O'Meara		369	Harold Smith
Palmerston	Frederick Pirani		515	William Wood
Parnell	Frank Lawry		840	Hugh Campbell
Patea	George Hutchison		129	Arthur Remington
Rangitikei	Frank Lethbridge		532	James Jervis Bagnall
Riccarton	William Rolleston	George Russell	1	William Rolleston
Selwyn	Cathcart Wason	Charles Hardy	140	John Rennie
Taieri	Walter Carncross		460	Alexander Campbell Begg
Taranaki	Henry Brown	Edward Smith	127	Henry Brown
Thames	James McGowan		1,184	Henry Greenslade
Timaru	William Hall-Jones		2,275	James Stephen Keith (Note: Note that in many newspapers, Keith is labelled as belonging to the opposition)
Tuapeka	Charles Rawlins	James Bennet	386	Charles Rawlins
Waiapu	James Carroll		1,329	Cecil Fitzroy
Waihemo	John McKenzie		Uncontested	
Waikato	Frederic Lang		322	John Hosking
Waikouaiti	Edmund Allen		332	John White
Waipawa	George Hunter	Charles Hall	557	George Hunter
Wairarapa	Walter Clarke Buchanan	J. T. Marryat Hornsby	156	Walter Clarke Buchanan
Wairau	Charles Mills		1,373	Walter Clifford
Waitaki	William Steward		1,427	John Campbell
Waitemata	Richard Monk		450	Charles Newman
Wakatipu	William Fraser		169	James Kelly (Note: Not to be confused with James Whyte Kelly, who was defeated that election in the Invercargill electorate)
Wallace	Michael Gilfedder		219	Allen Carmichael
Wanganui	Gilbert Carson	Archibald Willis	709	Gilbert Carson
Wellington, City of	John Hutcheson		1,116	Kennedy Macdonald
Wellington, City of	Robert Stout	Arthur Atkinson	383	Kennedy Macdonald
Wellington, City of	George Fisher		122	Kennedy Macdonald
Suburbs of Wellington	Charles Wilson	Thomas Wilford	536	Alfred Newman
Westland	Richard Seddon		Uncontested	
Māori electorates (Note: Note that the affiliation of many Māori candidates is not known.)
Eastern Maori	Wi Pere		907	Mohi Te Ātahīkoia
Northern Maori	Hone Heke		1,086	Eparaima Te Mutu Kapa
Southern Maori	Tame Parata		168	Taituha Hape
Western Maori	Henare Kaihau		1,812	Tureiti Te Heuheu Tukino V

Table footnotes:

== By-elections during 14th Parliament ==
There were a number of changes during the term of the 14th Parliament.

Electorate and by-election		Date	Incumbent	Cause	Winner
Otaki	1900	6 January	Henry Augustus Field	Death	William Hughes Field
City of Auckland	1900	27 April	William Crowther	Death	Joseph Witheford
Waihemo	1900	18 July	John McKenzie	Resignation	Thomas Mackenzie
Northern Maori	1901	9 January	Hone Heke Ngapua	Bankruptcy	Hone Heke Ngapua
City of Christchurch	1901	18 July	Charles Lewis	Resignation	George Smith
Patea	July 1901	18 July	George Hutchison	Resignation	Frederick Haselden
Patea	November 1901	6 November	Frederick Haselden	Election voided on petition	Frederick Haselden
Caversham	1901	19 December	Arthur Morrison	Death	Thomas Sidey
