= Fowlds =

Fowlds is a surname. Notable people with the surname include:

- Derek Fowlds (1937–2020), British actor
- George Fowlds (1860–1934), New Zealand politician
