= George Fowlds =

New Zealand politician

The Honourable Sir George Fowlds CBE
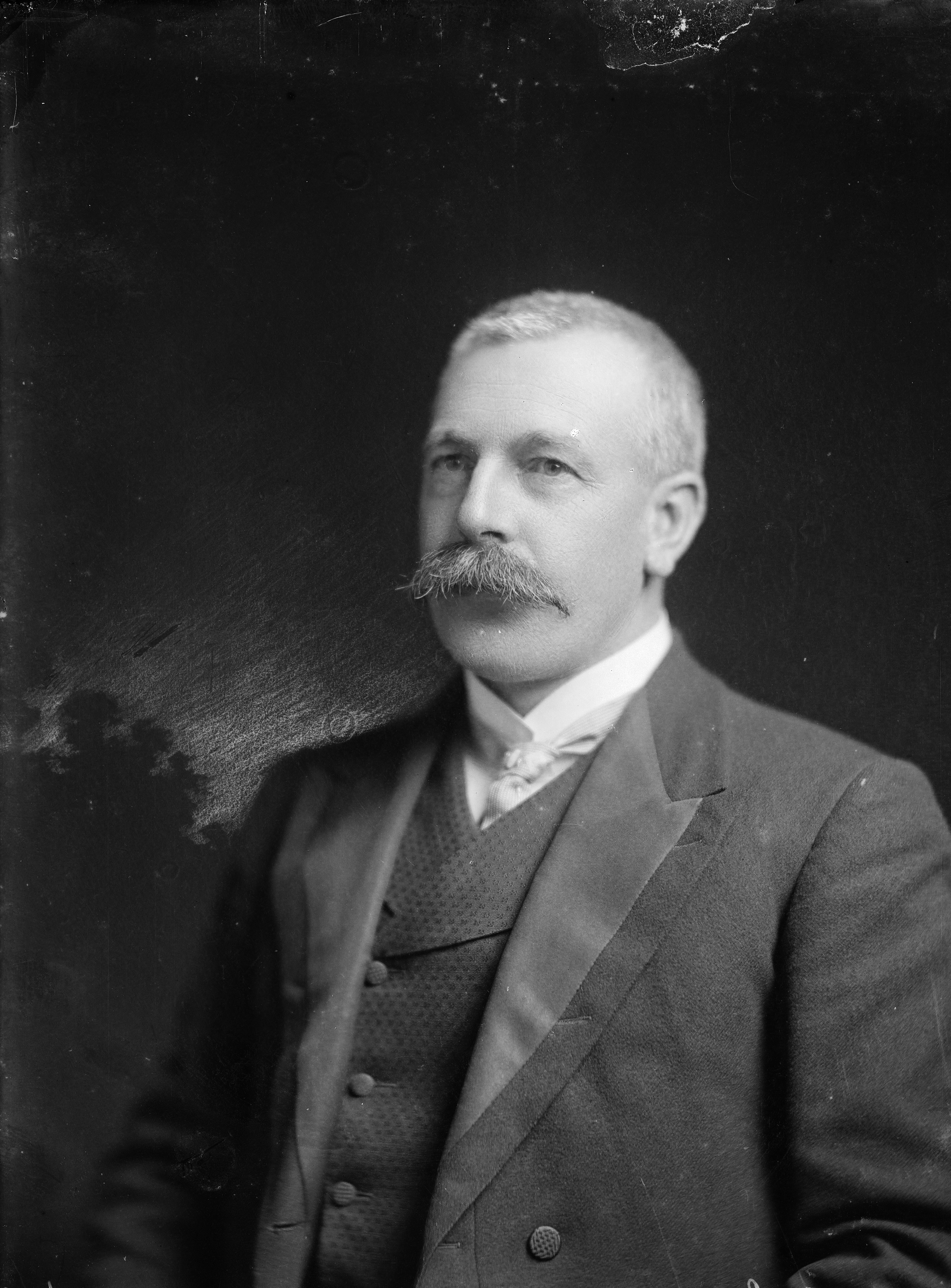

24th Minister of Customs
- In office 17 June 1909 – 4 September 1911
- Prime Minister: Sir Joseph Ward
- Preceded by: Alexander Hogg
- Succeeded by: Roderick McKenzie

19th Minister of Immigration
- In office 6 January 1909 – 4 September 1911
- Prime Minister: Sir Joseph Ward
- Preceded by: James McGowan
- Succeeded by: George Russell

13th Minister of Education
- In office 6 August 1906 – 4 September 1911
- Prime Minister: Sir Joseph Ward
- Preceded by: William Hall-Jones
- Succeeded by: Josiah Hanan

2nd Minister of Health
- In office 6 August 1906 – 6 January 1909
- Prime Minister: Sir Joseph Ward
- Preceded by: Sir Joseph Ward
- Succeeded by: David Buddo

Member of the New Zealand Parliament for Grey Lynn
- In office 25 November 1902 – 19 December 1911
- Preceded by: constituency established
- Succeeded by: John Payne

Member of the New Zealand Parliament for City of Auckland
- In office 6 December 1899 – 25 November 1902

Personal details
- Born: 15 September 1860 Fenwick, East Ayrshire, Scotland
- Died: 17 August 1934 (aged 73) Auckland, New Zealand
- Party: Liberal
- Other political affiliations: Labour; United Labour

Sir George Matthew Fowlds CBE (15 September 1860 – 17 August 1934) was a New Zealand politician of the Liberal Party.

== Biography ==
=== Early life and career ===
Fowlds was born in Fenwick, East Ayrshire, Scotland. His father, Matthew Fowlds, was a handloom weaver and was the last surviving member of the Fenwick Weavers' Society. He lived to be 101 years old. As a boy, George Fowlds weaved linen sheets. He attended Hairshaw School in Waterside. He did his apprenticeship at a clothier in Kilmarnock, and later worked in Glasgow, where he attended night classes at Anderson's College. After completing his studies in commerce he worked several jobs as a general labourer, fencer, carpenter and painter before deciding to leave Scotland.

Fowlds emigrated to Cape Colony in 1882 and lived in Cape Town, Beaufort West, and Bultfontein. In 1884, he married Mary Ann Fulton, who was also from Fenwick. In the following year, they moved to Auckland, New Zealand, as the South African climate was detrimental to his wife's health. He built up a business as a clothier in Victoria Street. In New Zealand he became involved in community affairs becoming a prominent Freemason, Rotarian, member of the Workers' Educational Association (WEA) and was chairman of the Congregational Union of New Zealand.

=== Member of Parliament ===
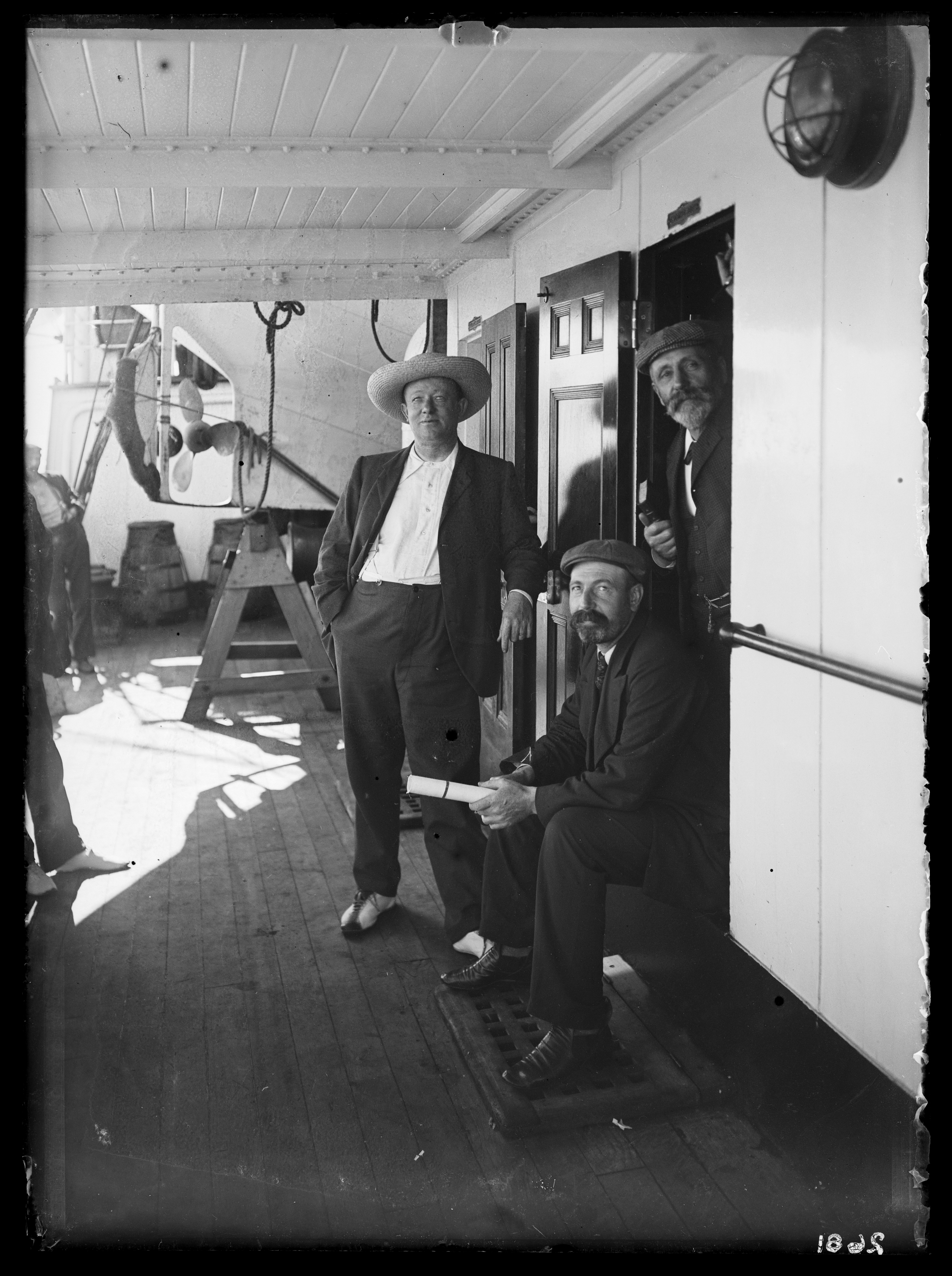
Edmund Allen, Fowlds and John O'Meara during the Parliamentary Excursion to South Sea Islands, 1903

New Zealand Parliament
Years	Term	Electorate	Party
1899–1902	14th	City of Auckland	Liberal
1902–1905	15th	Grey Lynn	Liberal
1905–1908	16th	Grey Lynn	Liberal
1908–1911	17th	Grey Lynn	Liberal

In the 1896 election, Fowlds stood in the three-member City of Auckland electorate and came seventh. Fowlds represented the City of Auckland electorate from 1899 to 1902, and then the Grey Lynn electorate from 1902 to 1911. In 1890, Fowlds moved his family to Mount Albert, to a large country house known as Greystone Knowe.

He was a firm believer in a single tax and was by extension the president of the New Zealand Land Values League, a Georgist group dedicated to implementing a land value tax. In 1905 Fowlds decided to return to Scotland for his father's 100th birthday. He decided he needed a New Zealand passport when his ship was about to leave, though they were not then usually required for overseas travel; an inconvenience to the department, and to the Governor who then personally signed each New Zealand passport.

Though critical of some of the policies of Premier Richard Seddon, Fowlds did not support the New Liberal Party in 1905. He was "in favour of the referendum and an elective Executive". He immediately earned a reputation as a left-wing among Liberals and was kept out of the cabinet by Seddon, who though he would have made a good minister but for his belief in the single tax.

Seddon's successor, Sir Joseph Ward, appointed Fowlds to the cabinet on condition he hold in abeyance some of his more radical views. He was appointed Minister of Education and Minister of Public Health in 1906 before dropping the health portfolio in 1909 when he was instead designated Minister of Customs and Minister of Immigration.

=== Independent Liberal ===
He resigned from Cabinet in September 1911 over the single tax issue. He stayed in Parliament so he could remain a private member until there was "a truly democratic party in a position to form a government". His resignation from the ministry was seen as a contributing factor to the fall of the Liberal government in 1912. In 1911, Fowlds introduced the Proportional Representation And Effective Voting Bill (86–1). However, this bill failed to be passed into law.

Fowlds stood as an Independent Liberal Labour candidate for Grey Lynn in the 1911 election. He then became involved in the task of creating a moderate Labour Party in New Zealand and was a high-profile attendee of the Labour Unity Conferences. He joined the United Labour Party (ULP) and was chairman of the Auckland ULP from 1912 to 1913. At the next election in 1914 he contested Grey Lynn again as the ULP candidate. But, in 1919, he was again a Liberal. After his third consecutive defeat he withdrew from politics and devoted himself to education governance.

=== Later life and death ===
Fowlds then became president of Auckland University College. He was the first chairman of Massey Agricultural College from 1927 to 1934.

He died on 17 August 1934 at Auckland and was survived by his wife.

== Awards and legacy ==
Fowlds was made a Commander of the Order of the British Empire in 1919, and appointed a Knight Bachelor, for public services, in the 1928 King's Birthday Honours.

The personal papers of Sir George Fowlds are housed in Special Collections at the University of Auckland Library. The extensive collection covers political, personal, business and social matters and includes letters, newspaper clippings, speech drafts, articles, sermons, accounts books, photographs and cartoons.

Fowlds Park was named after him in 1933.

One of his sons, William Forrest Fowlds, was a member of the Auckland City Council from 1941 to 1947.

== Notes ==
New Zealand Parliament
Preceded by James Job Holland; William Crowther; Thomas Thompson	Member of Parliament for City of Auckland; 1899–1902; Served alongside: William Napier, William Crowther, Joseph Witheford	Succeeded by Frederick Baume; Joseph Witheford; Alfred Kidd
New constituency	Member of Parliament for Grey Lynn; 1902–1911	Succeeded by John Payne
Political offices
Preceded by Sir Joseph Ward	Minister of Health; 1906–1909	Succeeded by David Buddo
Preceded by William Hall-Jones	Minister of Education; 1906–1911	Succeeded by Josiah Hanan
Preceded by James McGowan	Minister of Immigration; 1909–1911	Succeeded by George Russell
Preceded by Alexander Hogg	Minister of Customs; 1909–1911	Succeeded by Roderick McKenzie
