= Gilfedder =

Gilfedder is a surname. Notable people with the surname include:

- Laurie Gilfedder (1935–2019), British rugby union and rugby league footballer
- Michael Gilfedder (1866–1948), New Zealand politician
