= William Crowther =

William Crowther may refer to:

- William Crowther (Australian politician) (1817–1885)
- William Crowther (New Zealand politician) (1834–1900)
- William Crowther (programmer) (born 1936), American computer programmer
