= Alfred Kidd =

New Zealand politician (1851–1917)

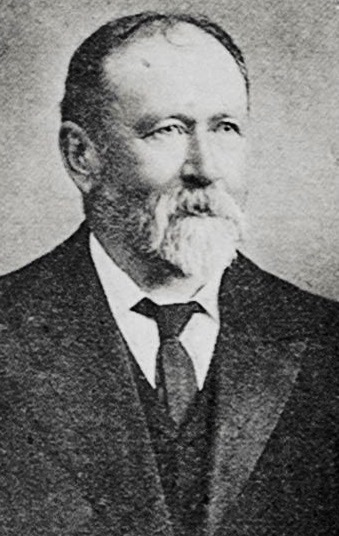

Member of the New Zealand Parliament for Auckland Central
- In office 6 December 1905 – 17 November 1908
- Preceded by: new constituency
- Succeeded by: Albert Glover

Member of the New Zealand Parliament for City of Auckland
- In office 25 November 1902 – 6 December 1905
- Preceded by: George Fowlds
- Succeeded by: constituency abolished

18th Mayor of Auckland City
- In office 25 July 1901 – 13 May 1903
- Preceded by: John Logan Campbell
- Succeeded by: Edwin Mitchelson

Personal details
- Born: 20 May 1849 Hounslow, Middlesex, England
- Died: 24 August 1917 (aged 68) Auckland, New Zealand
- Party: Liberal
- Spouse(s): Christine Whisker (m.1871); Ethel Anne Bridgeman (m.1907)

Alfred Kidd (1851 – 24 August 1917) was a New Zealand politician of the Liberal Party. He was the 18th Mayor of Auckland.

== Early life ==
Born at Hounslow, Middlesex, England, Alfred Kidd had arrived in New Zealand in January 1866 on the ship Ballarat, at sixteen years old, and worked in Māngere on farms for three years. On the opening of the Thames Goldfields, he moved there and "has seen it develop from a canvas town—there being only one wooden house then (Sheehan's)—to its present proportions." He was one of the first arrivals and he began to prospect immediately. For seven years he worked in most of the principal mines and before leaving he was an amalgamator at the Kuranui Battery. He left to take the position of steward and providore for the steamers of the Waikato Steam Navigation Company. He did this for three years and married Christine Whisker. With the opening of the railways taking the passenger traffic from the river, Kidd came to Auckland and entered into the hotel keeping business. On his arrival he took over the licence of the old Provincial Hotel in Prince's Street and the Anchor Hotel. He held the license for the Commercial Hotel, (the oldest licensed house, it is claimed, in New Zealand—dating from 1841), now de Bretts, on the corner of High Street and Shortland Streets from 1882 until 1903.

== Political career ==
New Zealand Parliament
Years	Term	Electorate	Party
1902–1905	15th	City of Auckland	Liberal
1905–1908	16th	Auckland Central	Liberal

Alfred Kidd started his political career by being a Parnell Borough councillor. On the Auckland City Council, he was chairman of the Streets Committee, a member of the Library Committee and chairman of the Finance Committee. He was acting mayor during the term of David Goldie, as Mr Goldie was often ill. Then Logan Campbell made it a condition of his accepting the mayoralty that Alfred Kidd be acting mayor again. There are several press reports of the time saying it was scandalous that Kidd was not made mayor during the visit of the Duke and Duchess of York as he had effectively done all the work under the previous mayoralty of Goldie, one of the reports pointing out that a factor in the decision was that he would not be able to entertain the Duke at the Northern Club as he was not a member. Kidd was elected mayor in his own right for three years in 1902. He worked tirelessly to create the new electric tramways, new sewerage and roads. He followed very popular movements, promoting workers rights and opening up Māori land, and was then pressured to go into parliament, suggesting that he was the only man who could control the Prime Minister Richard Seddon.

At the time of purchasing the land at 74 & 76 Gillies Avenue, Kidd was one of the oldest sitting members of the Auckland City Council, having been first elected in 1885. He had resigned in 1888, when his projects for developing 159 acres at Ellerslie in the southern part of Remuera, fell victim to a property crash and he filed for bankruptcy. However he paid his creditors in full and the bankruptcy was annulled then, after a brief period, he was re-elected, and held his seat until he became MP for Auckland in 1905. From 1902 to 1905, he was one of the three Members of Parliament representing the multi-member City of Auckland electorate. For the 1905 general election these multi-member electorates were split up, and he won the Auckland Central electorate, for which he became the sole Member of Parliament. He held the seat until 1908, and was Chief Whip – Seddon and Ward Governments. He ensured that the new Auckland Post Office was built, now the site of Britomart station and introduced several bills, including an important gambling bill that restricted gambling to racecourses.

In the 1908 general election, he was challenged by Albert Glover and came a distant second to him. Both were from the Liberal Party, which was not unusual at that time.

== Notes ==
Political offices
Preceded by John Logan Campbell	Mayor of Auckland City; 1901–1903	Succeeded by Edwin Mitchelson
New Zealand Parliament
Preceded by William Napier; Joseph Witheford; George Fowlds	Member of Parliament for City of Auckland; 1902–1905; Served alongside: Frederick Baume, Joseph Witheford	Constituency abolished
Vacant Constituency abolished in 1890 Title last held by George Grey	Member of Parliament for Auckland Central; 1905–1908	Succeeded by Albert Glover
Party political offices
Preceded by Frederick Flatman	Senior Whip of the Liberal Party; 1906–1908	Succeeded by George Laurenson
