= 1899 New Zealand general election =

- 6 (general) & 19 December (Māori) 1899

All 74 seats in the New Zealand House of Representatives 38 seats were needed for a majority
- Turnout: 77.6%
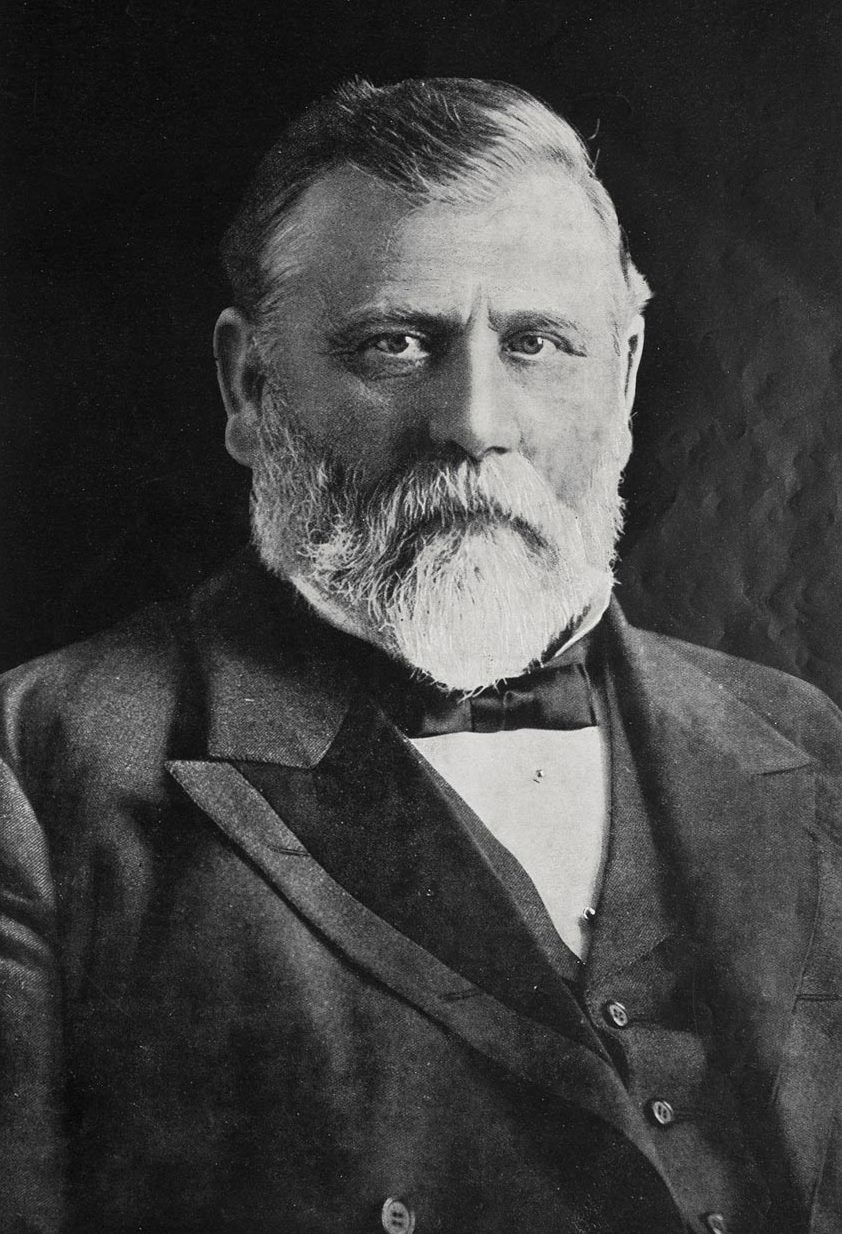

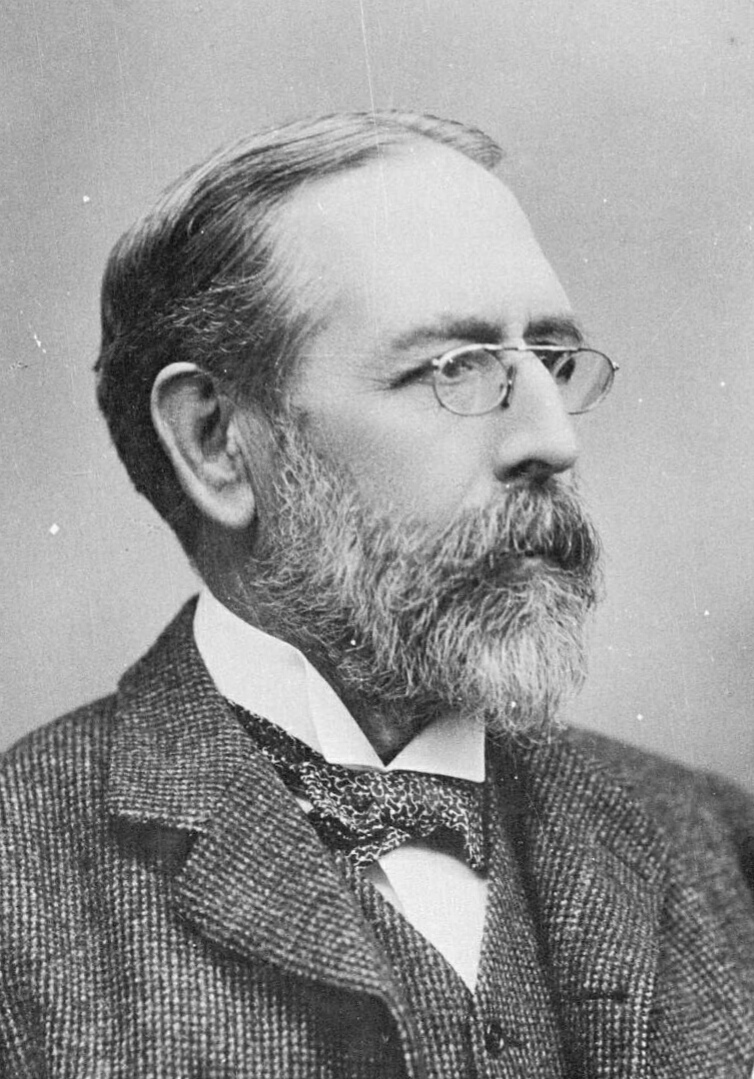
	First party	Second party
Leader	Richard Seddon	William Russell
Party	Liberal	Conservative
Leader since	28 April 1893	26 June 1894
Leader's seat	Westland	Hawkes Bay
Last election	39 seats, 54.8%	26 seats, 34.0%
Seats won	49	19
Seat change	▲10	▼7
Popular vote	204,331	141,758
Percentage	52.7%	36.7%
Swing	▼2.1%	▲2.7%
- Results of the election.
Premier before election
Richard Seddon
Liberal
Subsequent Premier
Richard Seddon
Liberal

The 1899 New Zealand general election was held on 6 and 19 December in the European and Māori electorates, respectively, to elect 74 MPs to the 14th session of the New Zealand Parliament. The election was again won by the Liberal Party, and Richard Seddon remained Prime Minister.

== 1896 electoral redistribution ==
The last electoral redistribution was undertaken in 1896 for the 1896 election, and the same electorates were used again. 34 seats were located in the North Island, 36 were in the South Island, and the remaining four were Māori electorates. Since the 1890 electoral redistribution, the four main centres had electorates with three seats each.

== The election ==
The 1899 election was held on Wednesday, 6 December in the general electorates, and on Tuesday, 19 December in the Māori electorates to elect a total of 74 MPs to the 14th Parliament. A total number of 373,744 (77.6%) voters turned out to vote. In three electorates there was only one candidate, and they were thus returned unopposed. Two of those were Liberal candidates: Richard Seddon in the Westland electorate, and John McKenzie in the Waihemo electorate. The third was an opposition representative, William Russell, who stood in the Hawke's Bay electorate.

Two candidates died during the election campaign. A third, Henry Augustus Field, died two days after having been re-elected in the Otaki electorate.

== Results ==
=== Party totals ===
The following table gives party strengths and vote distribution according to Wilson (1985), who records Maori representatives as Independents prior to the 1905 election.

Election results
Party	Candidates	Total votes	Percentage	Seats won	Change
Liberal	86	204,331	52.71	49	+10
Conservative	69	141,758	36.67	19	-7
Independent	43	41,540	10.72	6	-3

=== Votes summary ===
Popular Vote
Liberal	52.71%
Conservative	36.67%
Independents	10.72%

Parliament seats
Liberal	66.22%
Conservative	25.67%
Independents	8.11%

=== Electorate results ===
Seventy-four MPs were elected across sixty-two single-member, and four three-member electorates. The table below show the results of the 1899 general election:

Key

Liberal Conservative Independent Liberal Liberal–Labour Independent

Electorate results for the 1899 New Zealand general election
Electorate	Incumbent	Winner	Majority	Runner up
General electorates
Ashburton	Edward George Wright	John McLachlan	802	Charles John Harper
Ashley	Richard Meredith		751	Thomas Caverhill
Auckland, City of	Thomas Thompson	William Joseph Napier	1,440	James Job Holland
Auckland, City of	James Job Holland	William Crowther	938	James Job Holland
Auckland, City of	William Crowther	George Fowlds	94	James Job Holland
Avon	William Tanner		148	Arthur Rhodes
Awarua	Joseph Ward		1,732	W. T. Murray
Bay of Islands	Robert Houston		67	Norman Alexander McLeod
Bay of Plenty	William Herries		132	David Lundon
Bruce	James Allen		364	Crawford Anderson
Buller	Patrick O'Regan	James Colvin	552	Patrick O'Regan
Caversham	Arthur Morrison		1,108	William Henry Warren
Christchurch, City of	Charles Lewis	William Collins	1,760	Tommy Taylor
Christchurch, City of	George Smith	Charles Lewis	418	Tommy Taylor
Christchurch, City of	Tommy Taylor	Harry Ell	221	Tommy Taylor
Clutha	James William Thomson		497	Finlay McLeod
Dunedin, City of	Alexander Sligo	John A. Millar	2,319	Scobie Mackenzie
Dunedin, City of	John A. Millar	James Arnold	1,564	Scobie Mackenzie
Dunedin, City of	Scobie Mackenzie	Alfred Richard Barclay	637	Scobie Mackenzie
Eden	John Bollard		4	Malcolm Niccol
Egmont	Walter Symes		268	William Monkhouse
Ellesmere	William Montgomery	Heaton Rhodes	104	William Montgomery
Franklin	William Massey		1,180	W. Findlay Wilson
Geraldine	Frederick Flatman		1,556	Charles Nicholson McIntosh
Grey	Arthur Guinness		786	Michael Hannan
Hawera	Felix McGuire		55	Charles E. Major
Hawke's Bay	William Russell		Uncontested	
Invercargill	James Kelly	Josiah Hanan	4,640	James Kelly
Kaiapoi	Richard Moore	David Buddo	481	Richard Moore
Lyttelton	John Joyce	George Laurenson	1,813	William Jacques
Manawatu	Jack Stevens		148	Robert Bruce
Manukau	Maurice O'Rorke		1,031	John Edward Taylor
Marsden	Robert Thompson		1,314	George Alderton
Masterton	Alexander Hogg		1,191	Charles Cockburn-Hood
Mataura	Robert McNab		159	Irven Willis Raymond
Motueka	Roderick McKenzie		1,066	Walter Moffatt
Napier	Douglas Maclean	Alfred Fraser	38	Douglas Maclean
City of Nelson	John Graham		581	Richmond Hursthouse
Oamaru	Tom Duncan		1,254	Jack MacPherson
Ohinemuri	Alfred Cadman	Jackson Palmer	295	Edward Moss
Otaki	Henry Field		305	Charles Morison
Pahiatua	John O'Meara		369	Harold Smith
Palmerston	Frederick Pirani (Note: Pirani was endorsed as a candidate by the opposition mid-campaign)		515	William Wood
Parnell	Frank Lawry		840	Hugh Campbell
Patea	George Hutchison		129	Arthur Remington
Rangitikei	Frank Lethbridge		532	James Jervis Bagnall
Riccarton	William Rolleston	George Russell	1	William Rolleston
Selwyn	Cathcart Wason	Charles Hardy	140	John Rennie
Taieri	Walter Carncross		460	Alexander Campbell Begg
Taranaki	Henry Brown	Edward Smith	127	Henry Brown
Thames	James McGowan		1,184	Henry Greenslade
Timaru	William Hall-Jones		2,275	James Stephen Keith (Note: Note that in many newspapers, Keith is labelled as belonging to the opposition)
Tuapeka	Charles Rawlins	James Bennet	386	Charles Rawlins
Waiapu	James Carroll		1,329	Cecil Fitzroy
Waihemo	John McKenzie		Uncontested	
Waikato	Frederic Lang		322	John Hosking
Waikouaiti	Edmund Allen		332	John White
Waipawa	George Hunter	Charles Hall	557	George Hunter
Wairarapa	Wally Buchanan	J. T. Marryat Hornsby	156	Wally Buchanan
Wairau	Charlie Mills		1,373	Walter Clifford
Waitaki	William Steward		1,427	John Campbell
Waitemata	Richard Monk		450	Charles Newman
Wakatipu	William Fraser		169	James Kelly (Note: Not to be confused with James Whyte Kelly, who was defeated that election in the Invercargill electorate)
Wallace	Michael Gilfedder		219	Allen Carmichael
Wanganui	Gilbert Carson	Archibald Willis	709	Gilbert Carson
Wellington, City of	John Hutcheson		1,116	Kennedy Macdonald
Wellington, City of	Robert Stout	Arthur Atkinson	383	Kennedy Macdonald
Wellington, City of	George Fisher		122	Kennedy Macdonald
Suburbs of Wellington	Charles Wilson	Thomas Wilford	536	Alfred Newman
Westland	Richard Seddon		Uncontested	
Māori electorates (Note: Note that the affiliation of many Māori candidates is not known.)
Eastern Maori	Wi Pere		907	Mohi Te Ātahīkoia
Northern Maori	Hone Heke		1,086	Eparaima Te Mutu Kapa
Southern Maori	Tame Parata		168	Taituha Hape
Western Maori	Henare Kaihau		1,812	Tureiti Te Heuheu Tukino V

Table footnotes:
