= John O'Meara (politician) =

New Zealand politician

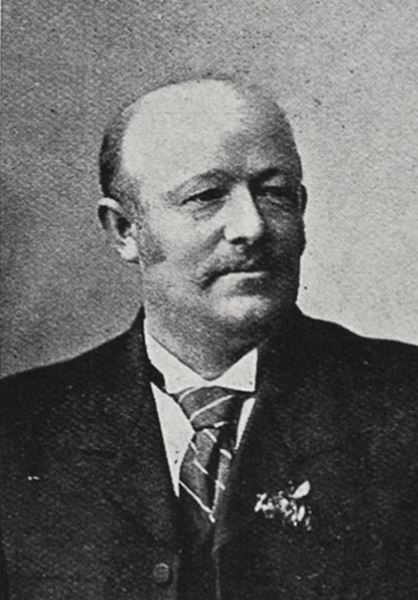

Member of the New Zealand Parliament for Pahiatua
- In office 4 December 1896 – 3 July 1904
- Preceded by: seat created
- Succeeded by: Bill Hawkins

Personal details
- Born: 1856 Australia
- Died: 3 July 1904 (aged 47–48) Woodville, New Zealand
- Party: Liberal

John O'Meara (1856 – 3 July 1904) was a Liberal Party Member of Parliament in New Zealand.

== Private life ==
O'Meara was born in Australia in 1856. He came to New Zealand with his family in 1868, and joined the Post and Telegraph Department in 1871. After that, he was in business in Queenstown in Otago. His sister married Albert Eichardt, the owner of Eichardt's Hotel. Soon after the November 1893 election, he moved to Woodville in the Manawatū-Whanganui region. He became an auctioneer by trade.

== Political career ==
New Zealand Parliament
Years	Term	Electorate	Party
1896–1899	13th	Pahiatua	Liberal
1899–1902	14th	Pahiatua	Liberal
1902–1904	15th	Pahiatua	Liberal

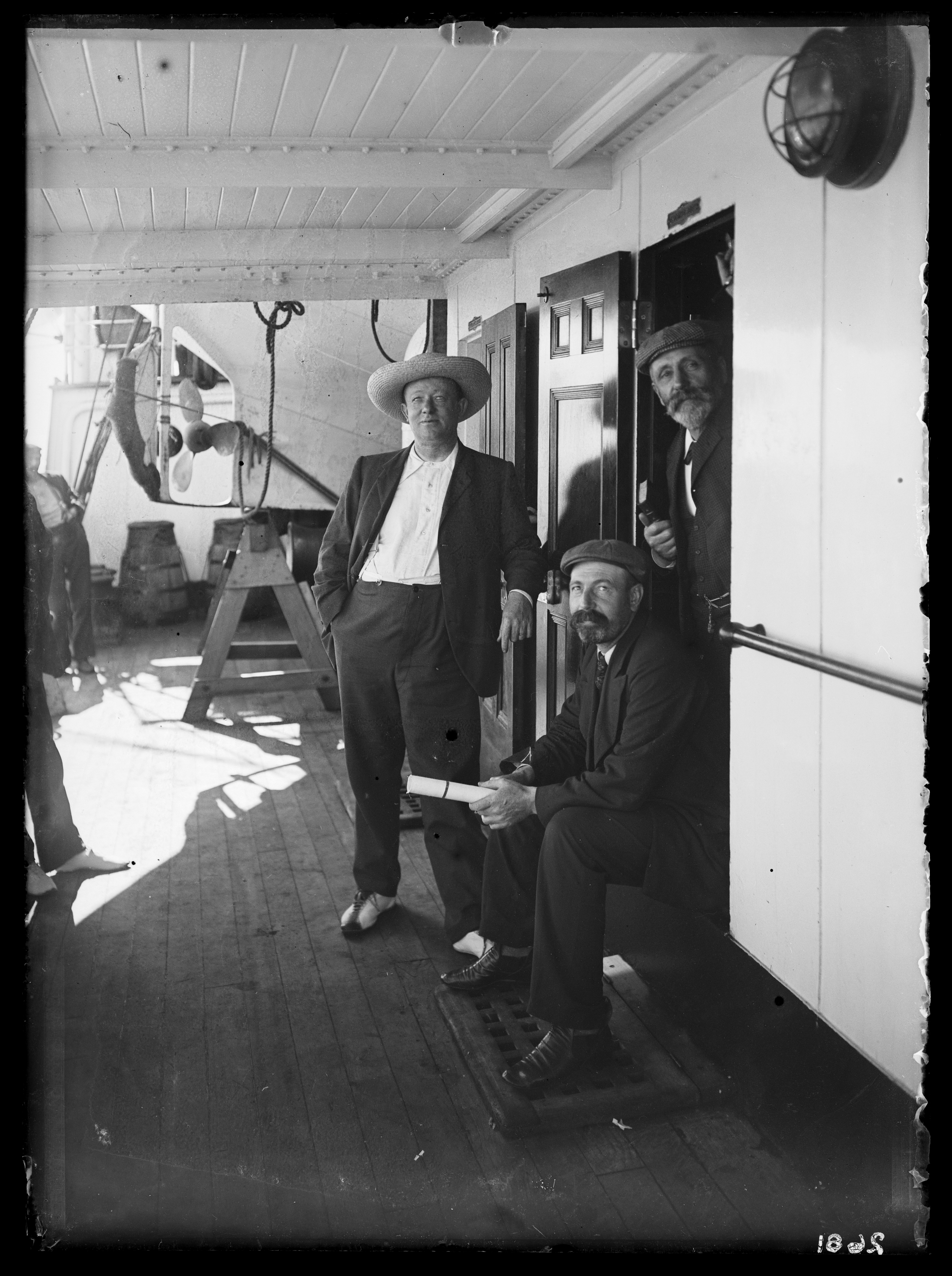
Edmund Allen, George Fowlds and O'Meara during the Parliamentary Excursion to South Sea Islands, 1903

O'Meara was chairman of the Lake County Council for some time, and a member of the Queenstown Borough Council. When Thomas Fergus retired from the Wakatipu electorate prior to the 1893 election, O'Meara was one of three candidates for the position; William Fraser won the election, and O'Meara came a distant second but ahead of William Larnach.

He was still relatively unknown in the Pahiatua electorate when he stood in the 1896 general election, and to the surprise of many, he defeated Robert Manisty and William Wilson McCardle. O'Meara held the Pahiatua electorate until his sudden death in 1904. In 1903 he was elected as the Liberal Party's senior whip in which role he was to serve until his death.

== Death ==
O'Meara died unexpectedly on 3 July 1904. Returning home from a bike ride, he had just passed his housekeeper when she heard him crash onto the gravel driveway; he was dead before a doctor arrived 15 minutes later. An autopsy found that an artery carrying blood to his brain was blocked. He was survived by his wife and eight children.

== Notes ==
New Zealand Parliament
New constituency	Member of Parliament for Pahiatua; 1896–1904	Succeeded by Bill Hawkins
Party political offices
Preceded by Walter Carncross	Senior Whip of the Liberal Party; 1903–1904	Succeeded by Frederick Flatman
