= Frederick Baume =

New Zealand lawyer and politician

Frederick Baume KC
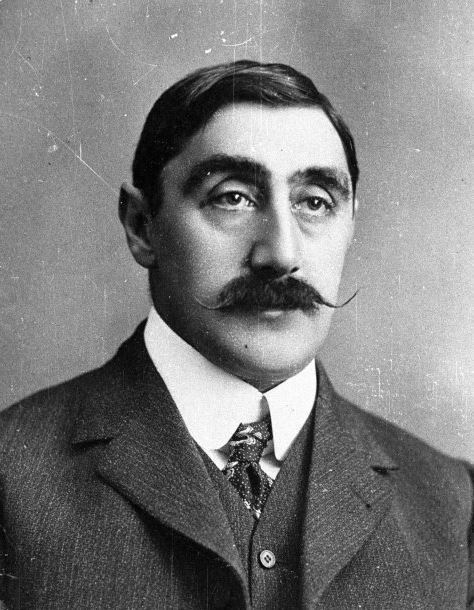

Member of the New Zealand Parliament for Auckland East
- In office 6 December 1905 – 14 May 1910
- Preceded by: new constituency
- Succeeded by: Arthur Myers

Member of the New Zealand Parliament for City of Auckland
- In office 25 November 1902 – 6 December 1905
- Preceded by: William Napier
- Succeeded by: constituency abolished

Personal details
- Born: 13 June 1862 Dunedin, New Zealand
- Died: 14 May 1910 (aged 47) Bad Nauheim, Germany
- Party: Liberal
- Spouse: Rosetta Baume
- Relations: Eric Baume (son); Arthur Myers (cousin)
- Children: 4
- Education: Otago University; Auckland University
- Profession: Lawyer

Frederick Ehrenfried Baume KC (13 June 1862 – 14 May 1910) was a New Zealand lawyer and politician of the Liberal Party.

== Biography ==
=== Early life ===
Baume was born "Friedrich Baume" in Dunedin, New Zealand, in 1862. His parents were Joseph Baume and Emilie Ehrenfried, Joseph was a photographer by trade. Between 1877 and 1883, Baume pursued careers in both commerce and journalism before studying law. He was admitted to the bar in 1884 and graduated with a Bachelor of Law in 1891. In 1896 he established a legal practice with A. E. Whitaker, a son of Frederick Whitaker.

=== Political career ===
New Zealand Parliament
Years	Term	Electorate	Party
1902–1905	15th	City of Auckland	Liberal
1905–1908	16th	Auckland East	Liberal
1908–1910	17th	Auckland East	Liberal

Upon moving to Auckland, Baume became a prominent figure there and soon entered the political arena. He became a member of the Auckland City Council as well as the Auckland Harbour Board.

From 1902 to 1905 he was one of the three Members of Parliament representing the multi-member City of Auckland electorate.

Before 1905, he had been associated with the New Liberal Party group, which disappeared after 1905.

In 1905, the multi-member electorates were split up, and he won the newly created Auckland East electorate. Baume was later considered for membership of Joseph Ward's first cabinet in 1906, however he was passed over due to his connections with the liquor trade.

Baume's health began to deteriorate and in 1909 he suffered a serious heart attack where the premature announcement of his death was reported. His health was to never fully recover and resigned in 1910 citing ill-health but died in Bad Nauheim, Germany, before the resulting by-election was held. He was succeeded in the Auckland East electorate by his cousin Arthur Myers.

== Family ==
On 21 June 1899 Baume married Rosetta Lulah Leavy in San Francisco. She was a university graduate and had been one of the first female high school teachers in the United States. Later, Rosetta became the first woman candidate for Parliament in New Zealand, standing for the Liberal Party for the seat of Parnell in 1919. In 1921 she remarried to Edward William Kane, clerk of the New Zealand House of Representatives and died in Wellington on 22 February 1934. Frederick Baume and Rosetta had four sons: Frederick (Eric), Neville, Alan and Sidney. Eric Baume later became well known in Australia as a journalist, broadcaster and novelist. Their grandson Peter Baume was an Australian senator.

New Zealand Parliament
Preceded by William Napier; George Fowlds; Joseph Witheford	Member of Parliament for City of Auckland; 1902–1905; Served alongside: Joseph Witheford, Alfred Kidd	Constituency abolished
Vacant Constituency recreated after abolition in 1887 Title last held by George Grey	Member of Parliament for Auckland East; 1905–1910	Succeeded by Arthur Myers
