= Robert Houston (New Zealand politician) =

New Zealand politician

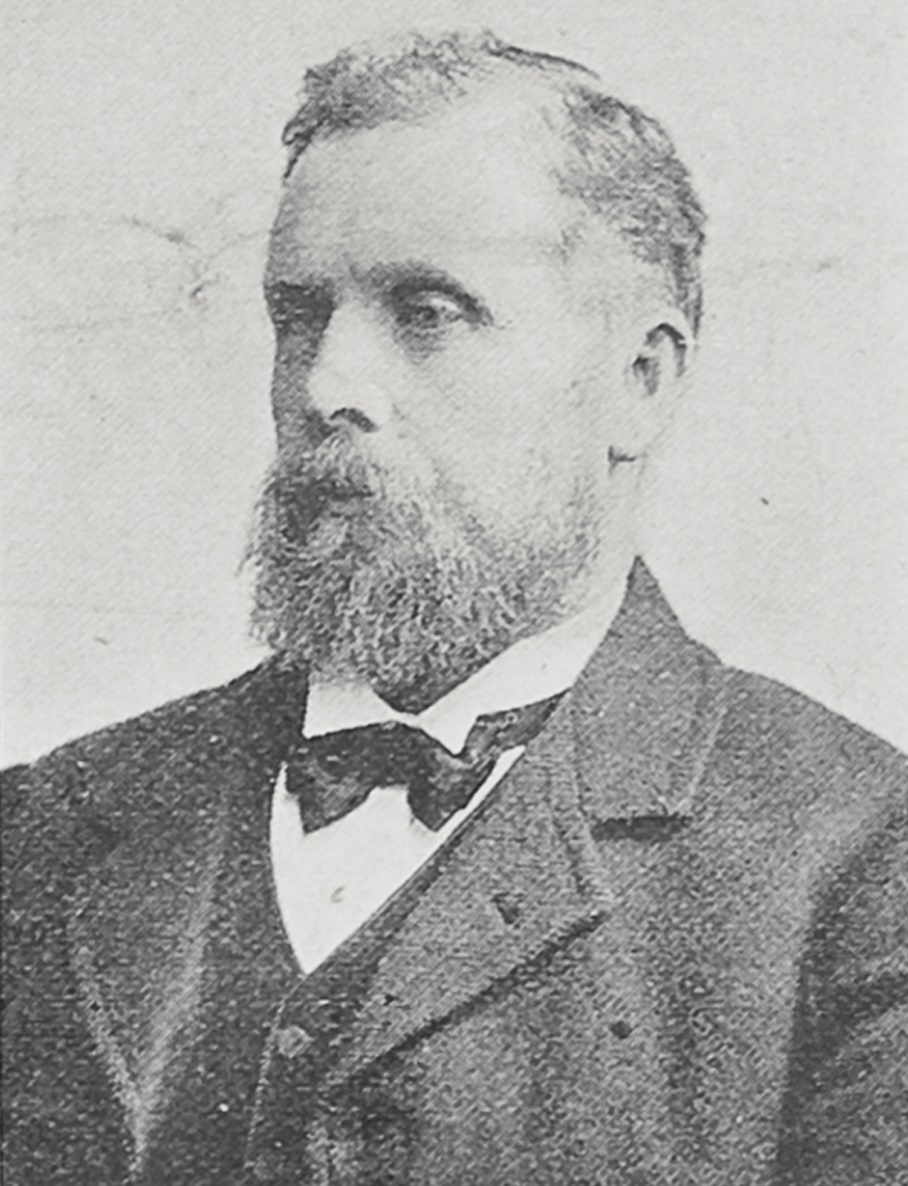

Member of the New Zealand Parliament for Bay of Islands
- In office 5 December 1890 – 17 November 1908
- Preceded by: Richard Hobbs
- Succeeded by: Vernon Reed

Personal details
- Born: 1842 County Down, Ireland
- Died: 27 September 1912 (aged 69–70) Mangonui, New Zealand
- Party: Liberal
- Spouse: Christina Stewart

Robert Morrow Houston (1842 – 27 September 1912) was a Liberal Party Member of Parliament in New Zealand.

== Early life ==
New Zealand Parliament
Years	Term	Electorate	Party
1890–1893	11th	Bay of Islands	Liberal
1893–1896	12th	Bay of Islands	Liberal
1896–1899	13th	Bay of Islands	Liberal
1899–1902	14th	Bay of Islands	Liberal
1902–1905	15th	Bay of Islands	Liberal
1905–1908	16th	Bay of Islands	Liberal

Houston was born in 1842 in County Down, Ireland. His father was Rev. T. Houston, DD. He received his education at Belfast Academy and Queen's College, Belfast. He emigrated to New Zealand on the Canterbury, arriving in Lyttelton on 10 January 1864. Later that year, he went to Auckland and then worked as a school teacher in Whangārei and Ōtara. After that, he became a storekeeper in Mangonui.

In 1870, he married Christina Robertson "Tina" Stewart of Auckland. Their son, Andrew Stewart Houston (born 1879), served in the Second Boer War. Another son, Harold Edward Houston (born 1885), died in action in France in 1916.

== Political career ==
He was chairman of the Mangonui Town Board, chaired the Oruaiti District Board, and for 24 years chaired the Mangonui County Council.

He was elected to the Bay of Islands electorate in the 1890 general election, and he represented the seat to 1908, when he retired. In the 1890 election, he contested the electorate against James Trounsen, John Lundon and Joseph Dargaville. Houston, Trounsen, Lundon, and Dargaville received 465, 454, 385 and 352 votes, respectively. He chaired the Native Affairs Committee for 15 years and stepped back from that role in 1906 for health reasons. Whilst he was a strong supporter of Richard Seddon, he was of the conservative end of the liberal spectrum and caused his party whips quite a bit of trouble over the years.

== Death ==
He died at Mangonui on 27 September 1912 aged 70 after a prolonged period of poor health. He was survived by his wife.

New Zealand Parliament
Preceded by Richard Hobbs	Member of Parliament for Bay of Islands; 1890–1908	Succeeded by Vernon Reed
