= Albert Glover =

New Zealand politician

Albert Glover MP
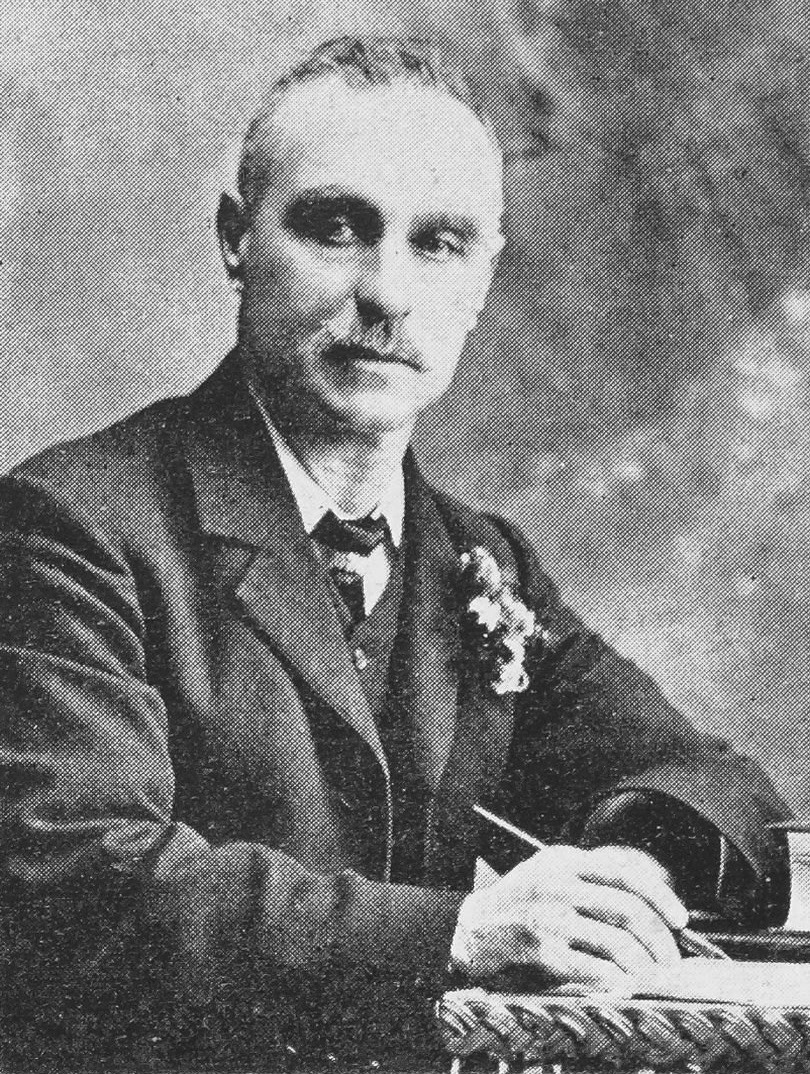

Member of the New Zealand Parliament for Auckland Central
- In office 2 December 1908 – 17 December 1919
- Preceded by: Alfred Kidd
- Succeeded by: Bill Parry

Personal details
- Born: c. 1849 Nottingham, England
- Died: 11 September 1941 Auckland, New Zealand
- Party: Liberal
- Spouse: Nancy Maguire
- Children: 5
- Profession: Import Merchant

Albert Edward Glover (c. 1849 – 11 September 1941) was a New Zealand politician of the Liberal Party.

== Biography ==
=== Early life and career ===
Glover was born in Nottingham, England, in about 1849. At age 13 he sailed with his parents to New Zealand and arrived in Auckland in 1862. Afterwards he spent several years working for his father in a hotel he owned in the Coromandel. He then became involved in mining and moved to Thames during the gold rush. Later, Glover returned to Coromandel after unsuccessfully prospecting for gold and then had a holiday in Rarotonga. Upon returning he set up business in Auckland importing fruit from the island and selling it on to local grocers. He would remain in the trade until his retirement from business in 1920.

=== Political career ===
New Zealand Parliament
Years	Term	Electorate	Party
1908–1911	17th	Auckland Central	Liberal
1911–1914	18th	Auckland Central	Liberal
1914–1919	19th	Auckland Central	Liberal

Glover became involved politically and joined the local branch of the Liberal-Labour Federation. In 1893 he was elected to the Auckland City Council where he would serve two separate spells totaling 16 years combined. In addition he was also a member of the Auckland Harbour Board, Hospital Board and Schools Committee.

Glover stood for Parliament in 1908 and was elected to represent the Auckland Central electorate. He ran against former Mayor of Auckland Alfred Kidd (the incumbent), both were from the Liberal Party, and it was not unusual at the time for there to be more than one Liberal candidate. Glover held the seat for three terms until 1919, when he was defeated by Labour candidate Bill Parry. Three years later he attempted to regain the Auckland Central seat for the Liberal Party, but was again beaten by Parry.

In 1929 he stood unsuccessfully for the Auckland City Council as an independent candidate.

=== Rugby league administrator ===
As the local MP, Glover chaired a meeting of 150 people on 20 July 1909 that formed the Auckland Rugby League. Glover was elected one of the ARL's first Vice-Presidents at the meeting.

=== Later life and death ===
Glover's wife Nancy died in 1934 aged 85. The Glovers had five children, three sons and two daughters. Glover died on 11 September 1941 aged 92. He was survived by all five of his children.

His son James Glover, then resident in Australia, enlisted in the Australian Imperial Force (AIF) eight times between 1915 and 1918 but was discharged for a raft of military offenses. In 1918 he was in the Rabaul Relief Force, but was discharged for drunkenness and using obscene language or creating a disturbance. Postwar he received two campaign medals, the British War Medal and the Victory Medal.

New Zealand Parliament
Preceded by Alfred Kidd	Member of Parliament for Auckland Central; 1908–1919	Succeeded by Bill Parry
