= John A. Millar =

New Zealand politician

The Honourable John A. Millar
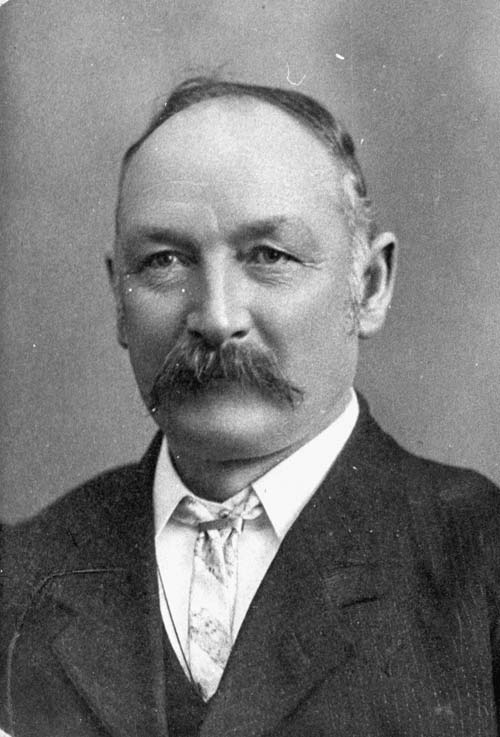
- Millar in c. 1910

4th Minister of Railways
- In office 24 May 1908 – 24 August 1912
- Prime Minister: Joseph Ward
- Preceded by: William Hall-Jones
- Succeeded by: Arthur Myers

Personal details
- Born: 8 July 1855 Jalandhar, India
- Died: 15 October 1915 (aged 60) Auckland, New Zealand
- Party: Liberal

John Andrew Millar (8 July 1855 – 15 October 1915) was a New Zealand politician of the Liberal Party from Otago.

== Early life ==
Born in Jalandhar, India, in 1855, he first came to New Zealand in 1870, but then embarked on a seafaring career. In 1881, he changed from international to coastal shipping. Although an officer, he was a member of the union. When he was elected the first full-time general secretary of the Federated Seamen's Union of New Zealand in 1887, he moved to Port Chalmers, as that is where the union's headquarters were.

== Political career ==
New Zealand Parliament
| Years | Term | Electorate | Party |
|---|---|---|---|
| 1893–1896 | 12th | Chalmers | Liberal–Labour |
| 1896–1899 | 13th | City of Dunedin | Liberal–Labour |
| 1899–1902 | 14th | City of Dunedin | Liberal–Labour |
| 1902–1905 | 15th | City of Dunedin | Liberal–Labour |
| 1905–1908 | 16th | Dunedin Central | Liberal |
| 1908–1911 | 17th | Dunedin West | Liberal |
| 1911–1914 | 18th | Dunedin West | Liberal |

He was a Member of Parliament for Chalmers in the 12th Parliament 1893–1896, for the City of Dunedin in the 13th, 14th and 15th Parliaments 1896–1905, for Dunedin Central in the 16th Parliament 1905–1908, and for Dunedin West in the 17th and 18th Parliaments 1908–1914.

He disagreed with some Liberal policies, but did not join the New Liberal Party group in 1905.

Millar was Chairman of Committees from 1903 to 1905. He was Minister of Customs (6 August 1906 – 6 January 1909), Minister of Labour (6 August 1906 – 6 January 1909; 17 June 1909 – 28 March 1912), Minister in Charge of Marine Department (6 August 1906 – 28 March 1912), and Minister of Railways (6 January 1909 – 28 March 1912) in the Ward Ministry.

In 1912 he was spoken of as a successor to Sir Joseph Ward as leader of the Liberal Party. But he did not stand in the ballot of 22 March when Thomas Mackenzie defeated George Laurenson (with 22 votes to 9) as he was not supported by Labour members of the caucus, although he had support from "arbitrationist" unions. So in July he appeared in the House to help turn out the Liberal government ... ill, pyjama-clad, consumed with the desire to destroy the government that he had not been permitted to lead.

He was appointed to the Legislative Council on 23 June 1915, but could only attend one meeting to be sworn in before his health failed him. He died in Auckland on 15 October 1915 and was buried in the Dunedin Northern Cemetery.

== Notes ==
Political offices
| Preceded by Arthur Guinness | Chairman of Committees of the House of Representatives; 1903–1905 | Succeeded by Roderick McKenzie |
| Preceded by Charles H. Mills | Minister of Customs; 1906–1909 | Succeeded by Alexander Hogg |
| Preceded by William Hall-Jones | Minister of Railways; 1908–1912 | Succeeded by Arthur Myers |
New Zealand Parliament
| Preceded by James Mills | Member of Parliament for Chalmers (Constituency renamed from Port Chalmers); 1893–1896 | Vacant Constituency abolished, recreated in 1902 Title next held by Edmund Allen |
| In abeyance Title last held by Frederick Fitchett | Member of Parliament for Dunedin Central; 1905–1908 | Succeeded by James Arnold |
