= 1900 City of Auckland by-election =

New Zealand by-election

- 27 April 1900
- Turnout: 11,000
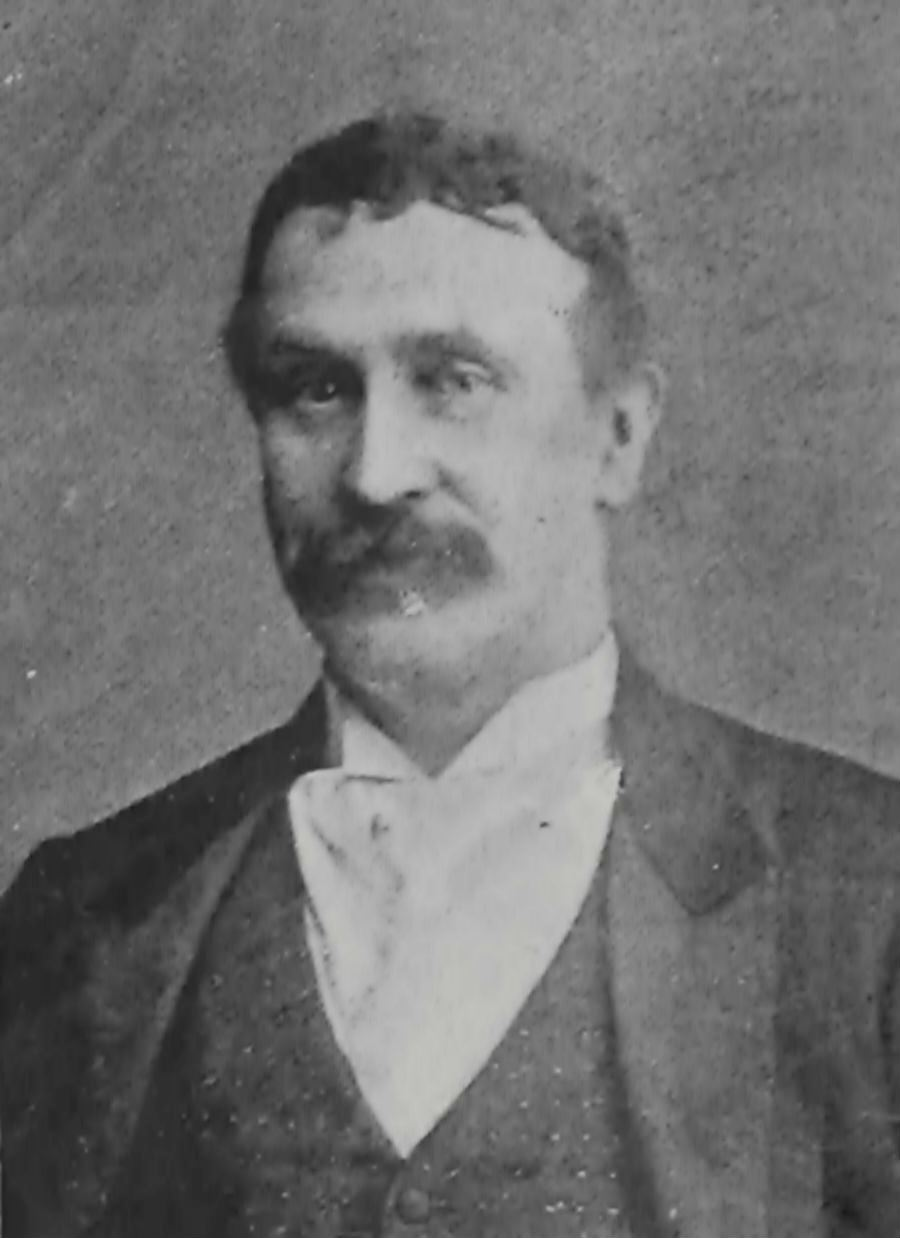

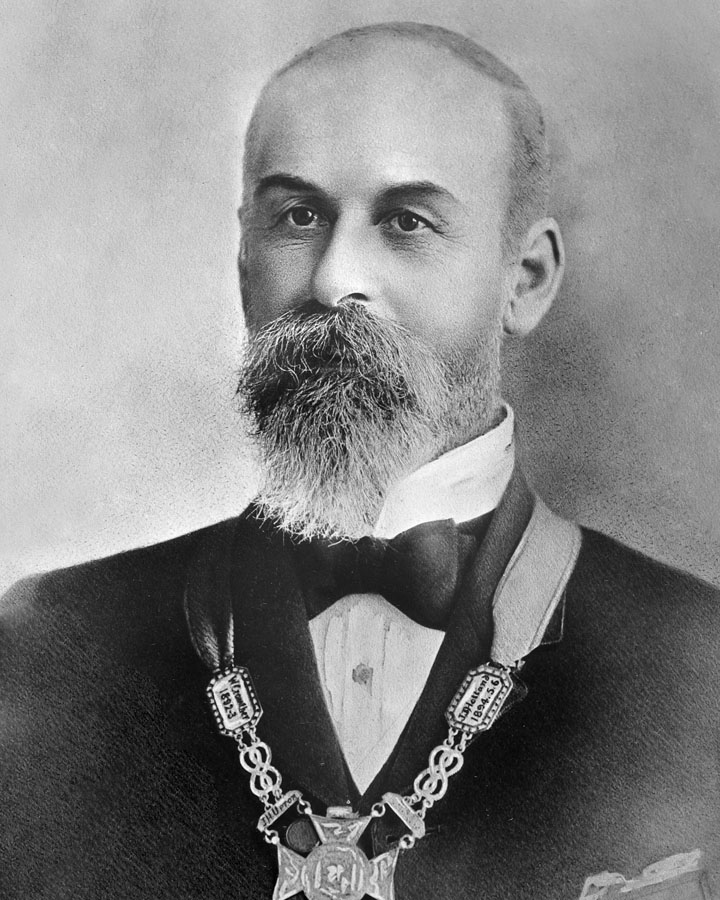
Candidate	Joseph Witheford	Richard Hobbs	James Job Holland
Party	Liberal	Conservative	Liberal
Popular vote	4,927	2,823	2,236
Percentage	44.79	25.66	20.32
Member before election
William Crowther
Independent
Elected Member
Joseph Witheford
Liberal

The City of Auckland by-election was a by-election in the New Zealand electorate of City of Auckland, an urban seat in the Auckland region, in the upper North Island.

== Summary ==
The by-election was held on 27 April 1900, and was precipitated by the death of sitting MP William Crowther. The seat was won by Liberal candidate Joseph Witheford who defeated four other candidates including Prime Minister Richard Seddon's personally endorsed candidate, the former Mayor of Auckland James Job Holland.

== Table of results ==
City of Auckland by-election, 1900
Party	Candidate	Votes	%	±%
Liberal	Joseph Witheford	4,927	44.79	
Conservative	Richard Hobbs	2,823	25.66	−10.39
Liberal	James Job Holland	2,236	20.32	−15.80
Conservative	William Richardson	991	9.00	
Labour	Leonard William Snellar Small	23	0.20	
Majority		2,104	19.12	
Turnout		11,000		

== Notes ==
- Scholefield, Guy (1950) [First published in 1913]. New Zealand Parliamentary Record, 1840–1949 (3rd ed.). Wellington: Govt. Printer.
