= William Joseph Napier =

New Zealand politician

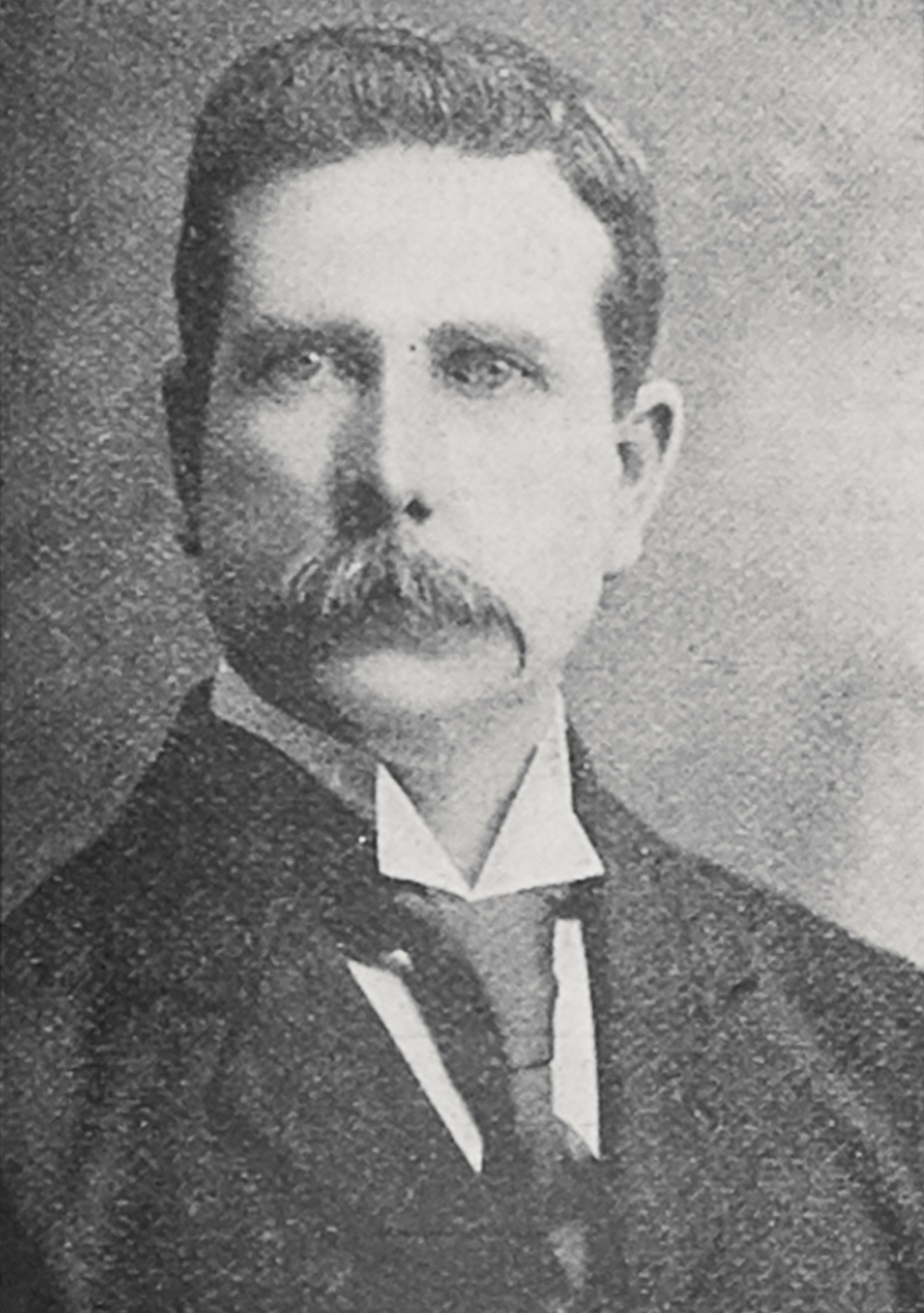

Member of the New Zealand Parliament for City of Auckland
- In office 1899–1902
- Preceded by: James Job Holland
- Succeeded by: Frederick Baume

Personal details
- Born: 1857 Ireland
- Died: 28 November 1925 (aged 67–68) Auckland, New Zealand
- Party: Liberal

William Joseph Napier (1857 – 28 November 1925) was a Liberal Party Member of Parliament for City Auckland (1899–1902) in New Zealand.

== Early life ==
Napier was born in Ireland and arrived in New Zealand when he was five years old. He was educated at St Peter's School, Auckland Grammar School and St John's College, Auckland.

== Lawyer ==
Napier was a lawyer. He was called to the bar in New Zealand in 1883, and in Fiji in 1886. In 1889 he became adviser to Mata'afa Iosefo, a ruler in Samoa. He was counsel to Sir George Grey until his death, and to Te Kooti and Rewi Maniapoto. He also acted for Malietoa Tanumafili I, another traditional ruler of Samoa, as well as the Government of Tonga.

== Politician ==
New Zealand Parliament
Years	Term	Electorate	Party
1899–1902	14th	City of Auckland	Liberal

Napier contested the 1890 election in the City of Auckland electorate. Of seven candidates, he came fifth. Napier was elected to the City of Auckland multi-member electorate in 1899, but was defeated in 1902. In 1901 he was chairman of the statutes revision committee. Napier was a member of the Auckland Harbour Board (1893–1907) and for a time chairman; a founder and president of the Navy League (1893–1907) and the Victoria League in New Zealand and captain for nine years of the Devonport coastguard artillery.

Napier contested the 1908 election in the Waitemata electorate, but was beaten by Leonard Phillips in the second ballot. He then contested the 1911 election in the same electorate and won the first ballot, but was again beaten by Phillips in the second ballot.

== Later life ==
Napier was elected a fellow of the North British Academy of Arts in 1910. Napier died at a private hospital in Auckland on 28 November 1925, and was survived by his wife and two sons. In 1914 he became the president of the Sunnyside Rugby League Football Club which played on the North Shore of Auckland before they merged with North Shore Albions in 1920. At the 1915 annual general meeting he did not seek re-election. The former New Zealand Prime Minister, Joseph Ward was appointed the club patron.

He is buried at Hillsborough Cemetery.

New Zealand Parliament
Preceded by James Job Holland	Member of Parliament for City of Auckland; 1899–1902; Served alongside: Joseph Witheford, William Crowther, George Fowlds	Frederick Baume
