= City of Auckland (electorate) =

City of Auckland was a New Zealand electorate formed for the election of 1853. It existed from 1853 to 1860, and from 1890 to 1905.

== Population centres ==
The City of Auckland electorate was one of the original electorates, and was used in the country's first election. It covered a territory roughly corresponding to the central business district of the city today, and was surrounded by another electorate called Auckland Suburbs. As the city was growing rapidly, however, the electorate did not last long – in the 1860 election, it was divided into Auckland East and Auckland West.

At the 1890 election, however, the total number of seats was reduced. This necessitated the re-creation of a seat to cover all of inner Auckland. This was accomplished by merging most of Auckland Central, Auckland West, Auckland North and Ponsonby, and taking a considerable amount of Parnell. In the 1893 election, the seat absorbed most of Newton electorate, but lost some of its southern territories to the remnants of Parnell. In 1902 election, Grey Lynn was split away into its own electorate. In the 1905 election, the remainder of the electorate was split in three, becoming Auckland Central, Auckland East, and Auckland West.

== History ==
The 1890 election was contested by seven candidates. John Shera, Thomas Thompson and William Lee Rees received 2006, 1860 and 1761 votes, respectively, and were elected. Adam Porter, William Joseph Napier, James Wallis and Harry Farnall received 1501, 1319, 748 and 262 votes, respectively, and were unsuccessful.

=== Members of Parliament ===
Key

Independent Liberal Conservative

Election	Winner(s)		
1853 election	Thomas Bartley	Loughlin O'Brien	James O'Neill
1854 by-election	William Brown	Loughlin O'Brien	James O'Neill
1855 election	Thomas Beckham	William Daldy	Logan Campbell
1858 by-election	Thomas Beckham	William Daldy	Thomas Forsaith
1860 by-election	Archibald Clark	William Daldy	Thomas Forsaith
(Electorate abolished 1861–1890 and split in two, see Auckland East and Auckland West; from 1887 to 1890 also Auckland Central)
1890 election	William Lee Rees	John Shera	Thomas Thompson
1893 by-election	Alfred Cadman	John Shera	Thomas Thompson
1893 election	Charles Button	William Crowther	George Grey
1895 by-election	Charles Button	William Crowther	Thomas Thompson
1896 election	James Job Holland	William Crowther	Thomas Thompson
1899 election	William Napier	William Crowther	George Fowlds
1900 by-election	William Napier	Joseph Witheford	George Fowlds
1902 election	Frederick Baume	Joseph Witheford	Alfred Kidd
(Electorate abolished 1905 and split in three, see Auckland Central, Auckland East, and Auckland West)

== Election results ==
=== 1902 election ===
1902 general election: Auckland
Party	Candidate	Votes	%	±%
Liberal	Joseph Witheford	7,854	58.73	
Liberal	Frederick Baume	7,540	56.38	
Liberal	Alfred Kidd	5,786	43.26	
Conservative	William Richardson	4,852	36.28	
Liberal	William Joseph Napier	4,271	31.93	−15.36
Labour	Arthur Rosser	3,504	26.20	−1.03
Independent Liberal	Robert French	3,055	22.84	+12.24
Independent	John Henry Hannan	2,016	15.07	
Labour	John Fawcus	966	7.22	
Conservative	Albert Penn Bradly	217	1.62	
Independent	H N Simson	58	0.43	
Majority		934	6.98	
Turnout		13,373	66.94	−3.37
Registered electors		19,976		

=== 1900 by-election ===
City of Auckland by-election, 1900
Party	Candidate	Votes	%	±%
Liberal	Joseph Witheford	4,927	44.79	
Conservative	Richard Hobbs	2,823	25.66	−10.39
Liberal	James Job Holland	2,236	20.32	−15.80
Conservative	William Richardson	991	9.00	
Labour	Leonard William Snellar Small	23	0.20	
Majority		2,104	19.12	
Turnout		11,000		

=== 1899 election ===
1899 general election: Auckland
Party	Candidate	Votes	%	±%
Liberal	William Joseph Napier	6,097	47.29	
Conservative	William Crowther	5,595	43.40	+17.72
Liberal	George Fowlds	4,751	36.85	−12.07
Liberal	James Job Holland	4,657	36.12	−15.19
Conservative	Richard Hobbs	4,647	36.05	
Liberal	Frederick Baume	3,792	29.41	
Liberal–Labour	Arthur Rosser	3,511	27.23	−10.87
Conservative	Samuel Vaile	2,456	19.05	
Liberal–Labour	James Regan	1,470	11.40	
Independent Liberal	Robert French	1,366	10.60	
Independent Liberal	Patrick Quinlan	334	2.59	
Majority		94	0.73	−10.09
Turnout		12,892	70.31	+9.56
Registered electors		18,336		

=== 1896 election ===
1896 general election: Auckland
Party	Candidate	Votes	%	±%
Liberal	Thomas Thompson	7,192	58.60	+19.85
Liberal	James Job Holland	6,298	51.32	
Conservative	William Crowther	6,004	48.92	+3.96
Liberal–Labour	Arthur Rosser	4,676	38.10	
Conservative	Charles Button	4,008	32.66	−8.68
Conservative	Edwin Mitchelson	3,620	29.50	
Liberal	George Fowlds	3,152	25.68	
Liberal–Labour	John Fawcus	906	7.38	
Liberal	John Shera	609	4.96	−2.82
Independent	Ernest Eugster	354	2.88	
Majority		1,328	10.82	
Turnout		12,273	60.75	+0.02
Registered electors		20,204		

=== 1895 by-election ===
1895 City of Auckland by-election
Party	Candidate	Votes	%	±%
Liberal	Thomas Thompson	5,528	60.99	
Conservative	Richard Monk	3,535	39.01	
Majority		1,993	21.99	
Turnout		9,063		

=== 1893 election ===
1893 general election: City of Auckland
Party	Candidate	Votes	%	±%
Independent	George Grey	6,379	62.57	
Liberal	William Crowther	4,584	44.96	
Conservative	Charles Button	4,214	41.34	
Conservative	Thomas Tudehope	4,146	40.67	
Liberal	Thomas Thompson	3,950	38.75	−20.23
Liberal	William Joseph Napier	3,531	34.64	−7.18
Independent Liberal	Edward Withy	2,393	23.47	
Liberal	John Shera	793	7.78	−55.85
Liberal	Samuel Vaile	502	4.92	
Liberal	Thomas Fernandez	92	0.90	
Majority		68	0.67	
Turnout		10,195	60.73	+14.30
Registered electors		16,788		

=== 1893 by-election ===
1893 City of Auckland by-election
Party	Candidate	Votes	%	±%
Liberal	Alfred Cadman	1,888	62.51	
Liberal	William Lee Rees	1,132	37.48	
Majority		751	24.86	
Turnout		3,020		

=== 1890 election ===
1890 general election: City of Auckland
Party	Candidate	Votes	%	±%
Liberal	John Shera	2,006	63.63	
Liberal	Thomas Thompson	1,860	58.98	
Liberal	William Lee Rees	1,761	55.86	
Independent	Adam Porter	1,501	47.61	
Liberal	William Joseph Napier	1,319	41.82	
Conservative	James Wallis	748	23.70	
Independent	Harry Farnall	262	8.31	
Majority		505	15.99	
Turnout		9,457	46.43	
Registered electors		6,788		

=== 1853 election ===
1853 general election: Auckland
Party	Candidate	Votes	%	±%
Independent	Loughlin O'Brien	415	84.46	
Independent	James O'Neill	391	79.58	
Independent	Thomas Bartley	269	54.75	
Independent	John Makepeace	257	52.31	
Independent	William Daldy	142	28.90	
Majority		12 (Note: Majority is difference between lowest winning poll (Bartley – 269) and highest losing poll (Makepeace – 257).)	2.44	
Turnout		491 (Note: As electors had three votes each, turnout is assumed to be the sum of votes divided by three.)	62.27	
Registered electors		789		

Table footnotes:
