= Alexander Hogg =

New Zealand politician

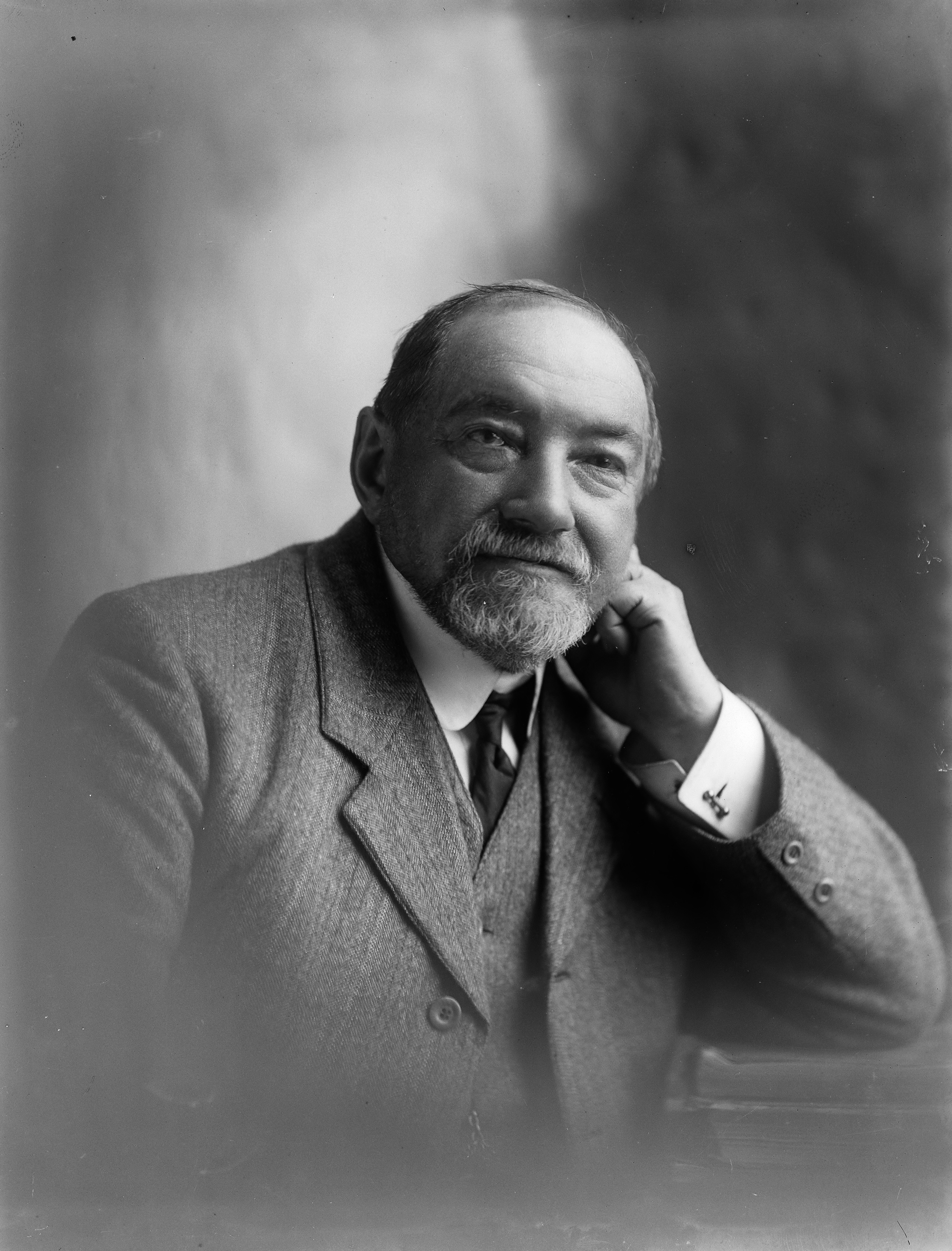
Alexander Wilson Hogg c. 1901

Alexander Wilson Hogg (9 February 1841 – 17 November 1920) was a member of parliament for Masterton, in the North Island of New Zealand.

== Member of Parliament ==
New Zealand Parliament
Years	Term	Electorate	Party
1890–1893	11th	Masterton	Liberal
1893–1896	12th	Masterton	Liberal
1896–1899	13th	Masterton	Liberal
1899–1902	14th	Masterton	Liberal
1902–1905	15th	Masterton	Liberal
1905–1908	16th	Masterton	Liberal
1908–1911	17th	Masterton	Liberal

Hogg contested the Masterton electorate in the 1887 election, but was beaten by George Beetham. He represented the Masterton electorate in the New Zealand House of Representatives for 21 years from 1890 to 1911.

From 1904 until 1905 he was the Liberal Party's junior whip.

=== New Liberal Party ===
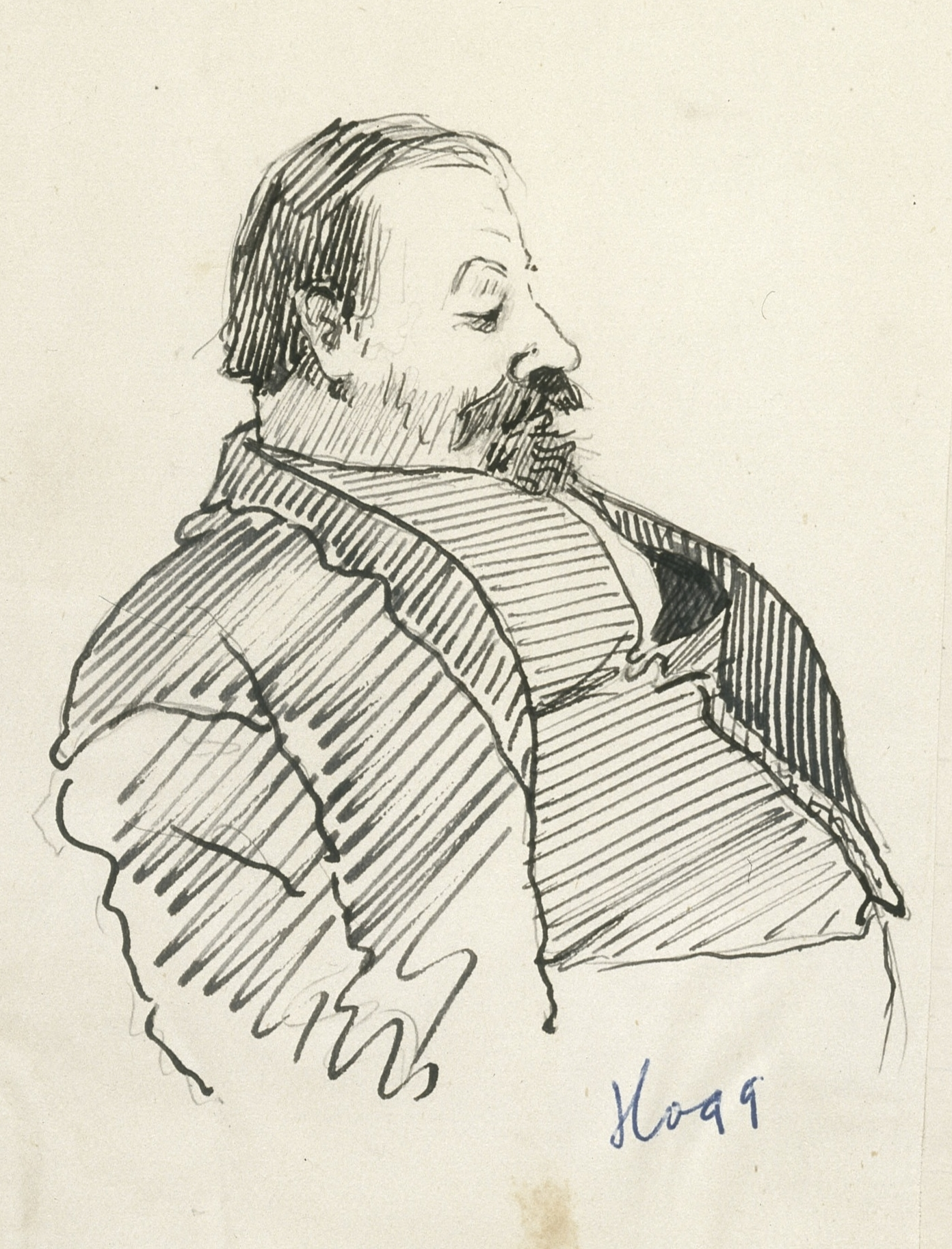
Alexander Wilson Hogg caricature, 1896

Hogg was associated with the New Liberal Party in 1905. Like most of the other New Liberals, Hogg wanted the establishment of a State bank, but he did not share their zeal for constitutional innovations, rejecting the idea of the referendum and claiming that the Elective Executive Bill should be put in the rubbish bin.

Hogg was made Minister of Labour, Customs, and Roads and Bridges in 1909. But he resigned from his portfolios in the same year because of general dissatisfaction with the Ward Government's policies.

Alexander Hogg sought election in 1911 as an Independent Labour candidate, and in 1912 became a member of the first New Zealand Labour Party. However, in the 1914 contest he stood as a Liberal in Masterton.

He was a newspaper editor/owner of the Wairarapa Star.

== Quotes ==
Alexander Hogg on politics in 1882:

Our system of general government is imperfect. The framework is already eroded and moth-eaten, loaded with parasites, suffering from a species of dry rot

Political offices
Preceded by John A. Millar	Minister of Customs; 1909	Succeeded by George Fowlds
New Zealand Parliament
Preceded by George Beetham	Member of Parliament for Masterton; 1890–1911	Succeeded by George Sykes
