= Frederick Flatman =

New Zealand politician

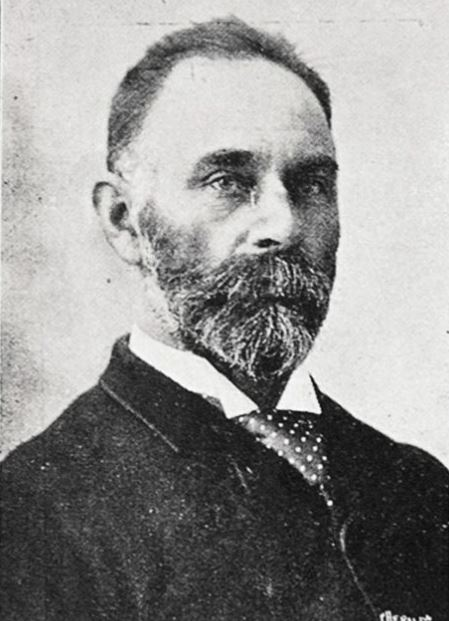

Member of the New Zealand Parliament for Geraldine
- In office 4 December 1896 – 17 November 1908
- Preceded by: Electorate in abeyance
- Succeeded by: Thomas Buxton

Member of the New Zealand Parliament for Pareora
- In office 28 November 1893 – 4 December 1896
- Preceded by: New electorate
- Succeeded by: Electorate abolished

Personal details
- Born: Frederick Robert Flatman; 1843 Suffolk, England
- Died: 21 September 1911 (aged 67–68) Woodbury near Geraldine

Frederick Robert Flatman (1843 – 21 September 1911) was a New Zealand Member of Parliament of the Liberal Party for the Pareora and Geraldine electorates.

== Early life ==
Flatman was born in Suffolk in 1843 and went to school in Oulton Broad. He came to Lyttelton on the Mary Ann in 1862 and went to South Canterbury. He was a successful businessman, and was storekeeper in Geraldine and Woodbury, and a sawmiller, before he concentrated on farming.

== Member of Parliament ==
New Zealand Parliament
Years	Term	Electorate	Party
1893–1896	12th	Pareora	Liberal
1896–1899	13th	Geraldine	Liberal
1899–1902	14th	Geraldine	Liberal
1902–1905	15th	Geraldine	Liberal
1905–1908	16th	Geraldine	Liberal

Flatman represented the Pareora and Geraldine electorates for fifteen years (1893–1908) in the New Zealand House of Representatives. He defeated Arthur Rhodes for the Pareora electorate in 1893 by 1594 to 1377 votes. From 1904 to 1906 Flatman served as the Liberal Party's senior whip. In 1908 he was defeated by William Nosworthy for the Ashburton electorate in the second ballot. Flatman represented the Pareora and Geraldine electorates for fifteen years (1893–1908) in the New Zealand House of Representatives. He defeated Arthur Rhodes for the Pareora electorate in 1893 by 1594 to 1377 votes. From 1904 to 1906 Flatman served as the Liberal Party's senior whip. In 1908 he was defeated by William Nosworthy for the Ashburton electorate in the second ballot.

Flatman represented the Pareora and Geraldine electorates for fifteen years (1893–1908) in the New Zealand House of Representatives. He defeated Arthur Rhodes for the Pareora electorate in 1893 by 1594 to 1377 votes. From 1904 to 1906 Flatman served as the Liberal Party's senior whip. In 1908 he was defeated by William Nosworthy for the Ashburton electorate in the second ballot.

The Lyttelton Times described Frederick Flatman as a member:

"not of the ornamental type, but plain, blunt, possessing strong convictions, straightforward manners and simple directness of speech. He also acquired in 3 years a surprising grasp and mastery of political questions. He was certainly the best of the South Island farmer members-perhaps the best in New Zealand. He was a fine man."

== Death ==
He died on 21 September 1911 at Woodbury near Geraldine.

== Sources ==
- Wilson, Jim (1985) [First ed. published 1913]. New Zealand Parliamentary Record, 1840–1984 (4th ed.). Wellington: V.R. Ward, Govt. Printer. OCLC 154283103.

New Zealand Parliament
New constituency	Member of Parliament for Pareora; 1893–1896	Constituency abolished
In abeyance Title last held by Arthur Rhodes	Member of Parliament for Geraldine; 1896–1908	Succeeded by Thomas Buxton
Party political offices
Preceded by John O'Meara	Senior Whip of the Liberal Party; 1904–1906	Succeeded by Alfred Kidd
