= Michael Gilfedder =

New Zealand politician

New Zealand Parliament
Years	Term	Electorate	Party
1896–1899	13th	Wallace	Liberal
1899–1902	14th	Wallace	Liberal

Michael Gilfedder (1866–1948) was a New Zealand politician of the Liberal Party.

He represented the Southland electorate of Wallace from 1896 to 1902, when he was defeated by John Charles Thomson, who is described by Wilson as also belonging to the Liberal Party.

In 1905, he stood unsuccessfully for the Wakatipu electorate. Gilfedder was also a judge of the Native Land Court from 1907 to 1933 when he retired.

== Notes ==
New Zealand Parliament
Preceded by James Mackintosh	Member of Parliament for Wallace; 1896–1902	Succeeded by John Charles Thomson
