= John Shera =

Liberal Party Member of Parliament in Auckland, New Zealand

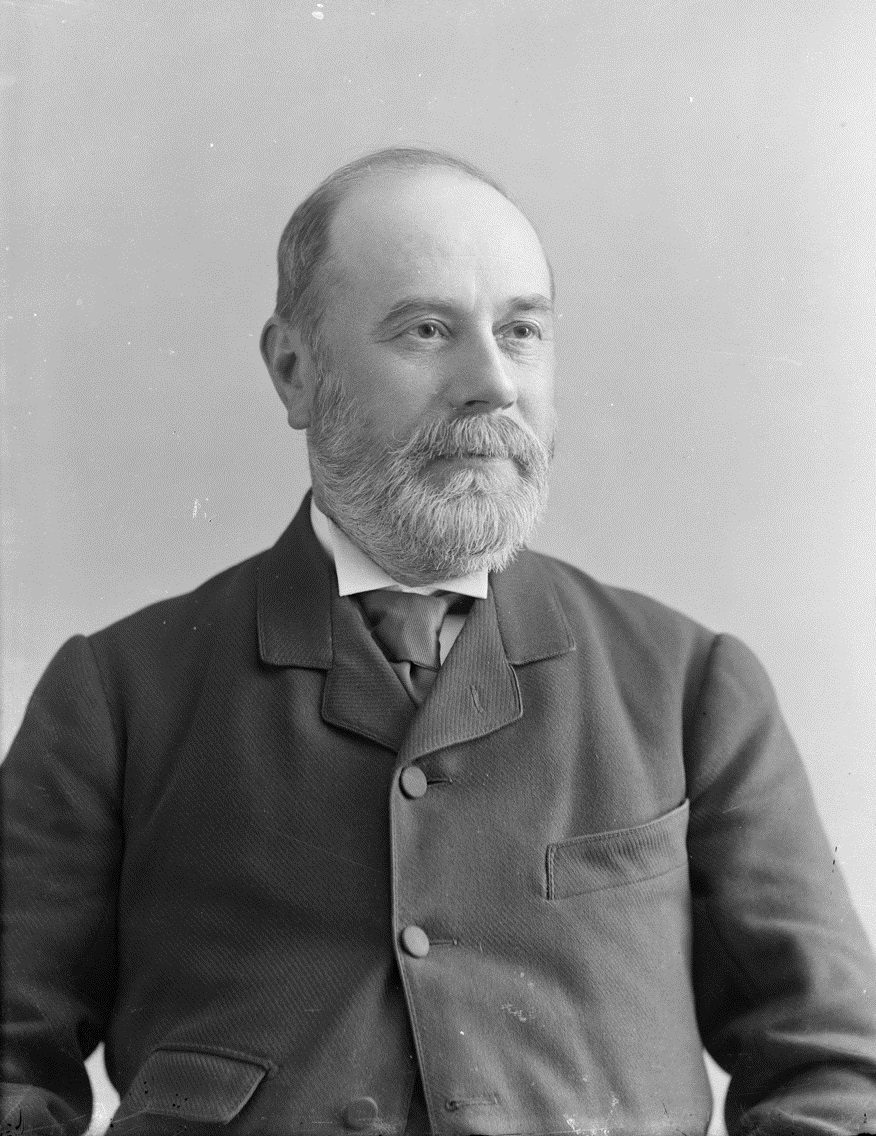

Member of the New Zealand Parliament for City of Auckland
- In office 1890–1893

Personal details
- Born: 1840 Ireland
- Died: 19 September 1906 (aged 65–66) Auckland, New Zealand
- Party: Liberal
- Spouse: Jemima Balneavis

John McEffer Shera (1840 – 19 September 1906) was a Liberal Party Member of Parliament in Auckland, New Zealand.

== Biography ==
=== Early life ===
Shera was born in Ireland in 1840. He sailed to Australia in 1867 before continuing on to New Zealand a year later. He landed in Auckland and found work as a share broker. He married a daughter of Henry Balneavis, Jemima Balneavis, at St. Paul's Church in April 1873. His wife was part-Māori and Shera ensured that Māori women were included in the electoral reform bill that granted women's suffrage.

=== Political career ===
New Zealand Parliament
Years	Term	Electorate	Party
1890–1893	11th	City of Auckland	Liberal

Shera represented the City of Auckland multi-member electorate from 1890 to 1893, when he was defeated. He had previously stood unsuccessfully in 1887 for the Auckland West electorate. He was a strong supporter of Sir George Grey.

He stood unsuccessfully in the 1902 election for the Parnell seat as an Independent Liberal.

=== Later life and death ===
Shera died on 19 September 1906 at his residence in Remuera, Auckland.
