= Joseph Witheford =

New Zealand politician

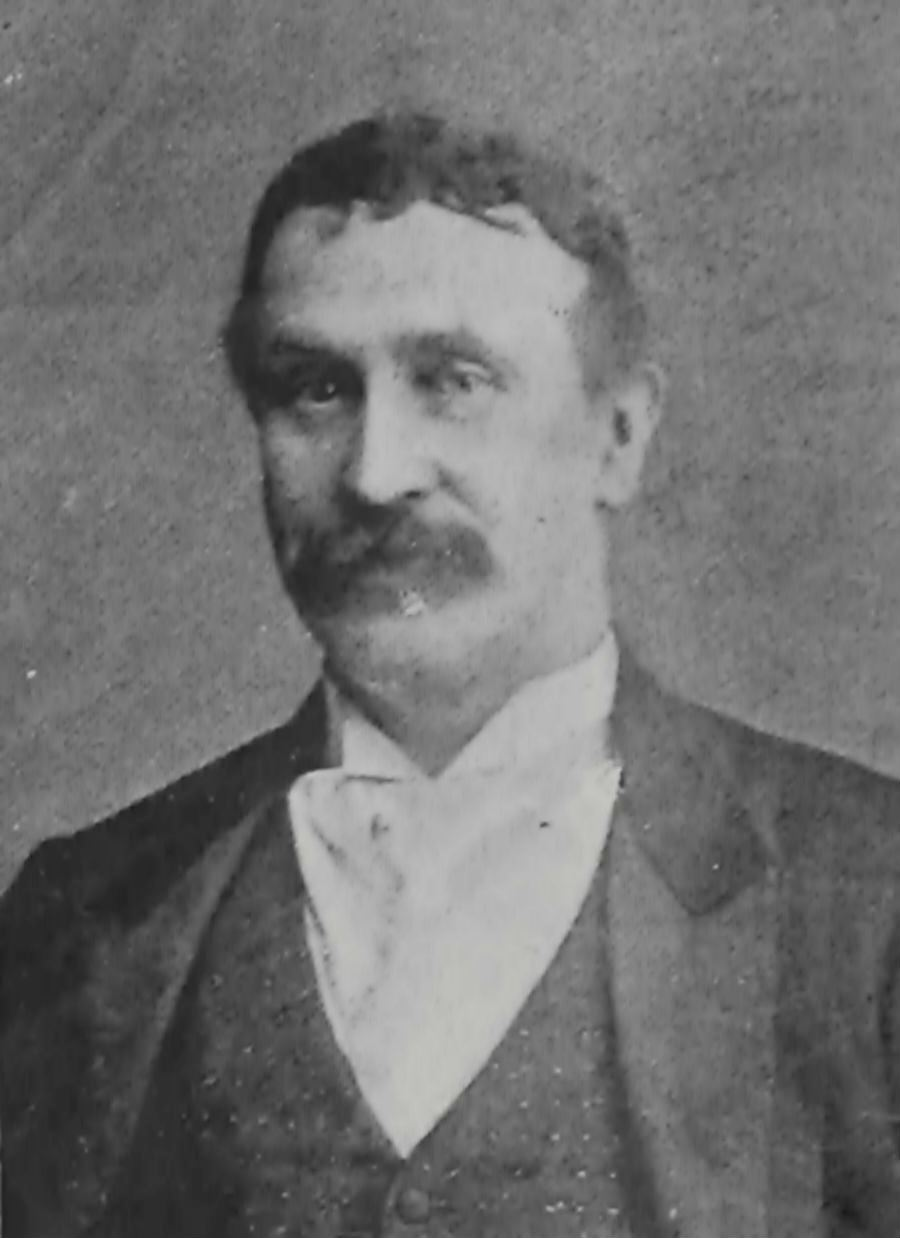

Member of the New Zealand Parliament for City of Auckland
- In office 1900–1905
- Preceded by: William Crowther
- Succeeded by: Constituency abolished

2nd Mayor of Birkenhead
- In office 1901–1905
- Preceded by: Charles Button
- Succeeded by: Albert Frederick Porter

Personal details
- Born: 1848 Bromsgrove, Worcestershire, England
- Died: 30 October 1931 (aged 83) Birkenhead, New Zealand
- Resting place: Pompallier Cemetery, Birkenhead
- Spouse: Emma Bartley

Joseph Howard Witheford (1848 – 30 October 1931) was a Liberal Party Member of Parliament in Auckland, New Zealand.

== Biography ==
He was born in Bromsgrove, Worcestershire, England, in 1848.

New Zealand Parliament
Years	Term	Electorate	Party
1900–1902	14th	City of Auckland	Liberal
1902–1905	15th	City of Auckland	Liberal

Witheford was elected to the City of Auckland electorate in a by-election on 27 April 1900, and held his electorate to 1905. In that year, the multi-member electorate was replaced by several single-member electorates, and Witheford retired from parliament.

Witheford served as mayor of Birkenhead from 1901 to 1905.

He died on 30 October 1931 and was buried in the Anglican section of Pompallier Cemetery, Birkenhead.

New Zealand Parliament
Preceded by William Crowther	Member of Parliament for City of Auckland; 1900–1905; Served alongside: William Napier, George Fowlds, Frederick Baume, Alfred Kidd	Constituency abolished
