= William Crowther (New Zealand politician) =

New Zealand politician

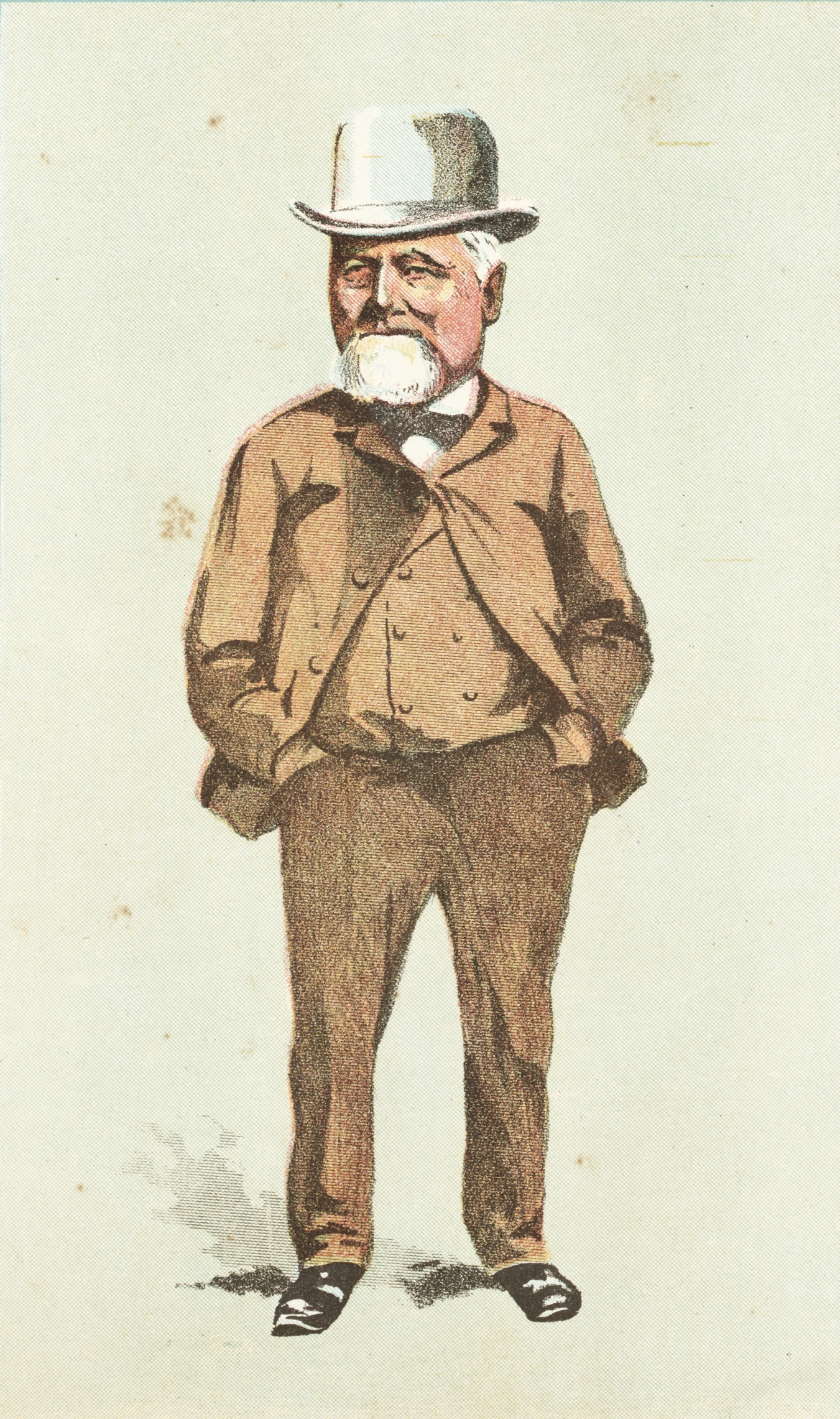
- A parliamentary sketch of "Hard to drive" William Crowther

17th Mayor of Auckland City
- In office 1891–1893
- Preceded by: John Upton
- Succeeded by: James Job Holland

12th MP for City of Auckland
- In office 1893–1900
- Preceded by: John Shera
- Succeeded by: Joseph Witheford

Personal details
- Born: 1830 Slaithwaite, West Riding of Yorkshire, England
- Died: March 1900 (aged 65–66) Auckland, New Zealand
- Party: New Zealand Liberal Party
- Other political affiliations: Independent
- Spouse: Georgina Stafford
- Occupation: Owner of livery stables; horse-drawn omnibus operator; politician
- Known for: Mayor of Auckland City

William Crowther (1834 – 15 March 1900) was a Mayor of Auckland and then Member of Parliament for Auckland, New Zealand.

Crowther was Mayor of Auckland from 1891 to 1893, after serving as a city councillor for sixteen years.

Crowther represented the City of Auckland multi-member electorate first as a Liberal Party then independent conservative from 1893 to 1900, when he died of stomach cancer, aged 66. The resulting by-election on 27 April 1900 was hotly contested, and won by Joseph Witheford.

== Businessman ==
William Crowther was born in Slaithwaite, West Riding of Yorkshire, in 1834. Aged nineteen, he migrated to Victoria, and was a successful contractor on the goldfields for ten years. He was then attracted to Otago by the Otago gold rush to the Dunstan, and brought with him a number of teams of horses and waggons. He later moved to Auckland and founded a horse-drawn omnibus service between Auckland and Remuera, based in the Victoria stables, Wellesley Street East, which he built.

== Politician ==
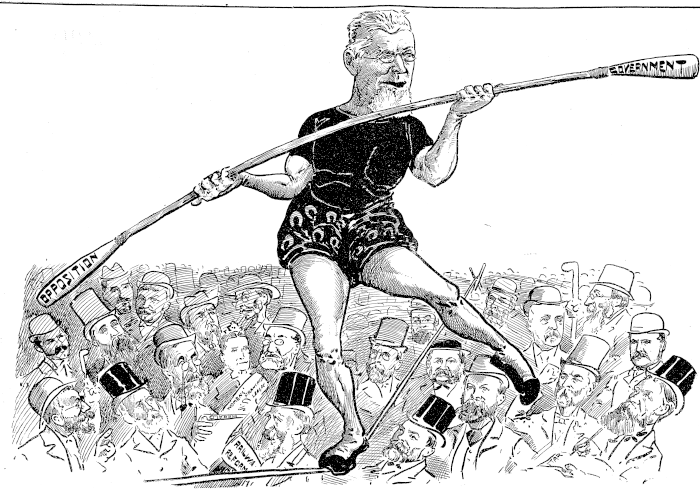
in which Mr Crowther, M.H.R., showed how cleverly he could balance himself on the almost invisible line dividing the conflicting parties (1895)

As well as serving on the city council and as Mayor of Auckland, Mr. Crowther was also a member of the governing body of Auckland College and Grammar school, the University College Council, the city schools' committee, the Charitable Aid Board, and Sailors' Home. For some years he was a member of the Harbour Board, and was chairman for a term.

Crowther changed his allegiance from the Liberal Party to Independent before the 1896 election.

New Zealand Parliament
| Years | Term | Electorate | Party |
|---|---|---|---|
| 1893–1896 | 12th | City of Auckland | Liberal |
| 1896–1899 | 13th | City of Auckland | Independent |
| 1899–1900 | 14th | City of Auckland | Independent |

== Death ==
Crowther died on 15 March 1900 and was buried at Purewa Cemetery in the Auckland suburb of Meadowbank.

== Notes ==
Political offices
| Preceded by John Upton | Mayor of Auckland City; 1891–1893 | Succeeded by James Job Holland |
New Zealand Parliament
| Preceded by John Shera | Member of Parliament for City of Auckland; 1893–1900; Served alongside: Charles Button, George Grey, James Job Holland, George Fowlds, Thomas Thompson | Succeeded by Joseph Witheford |
