= James Job Holland =

New Zealand politician

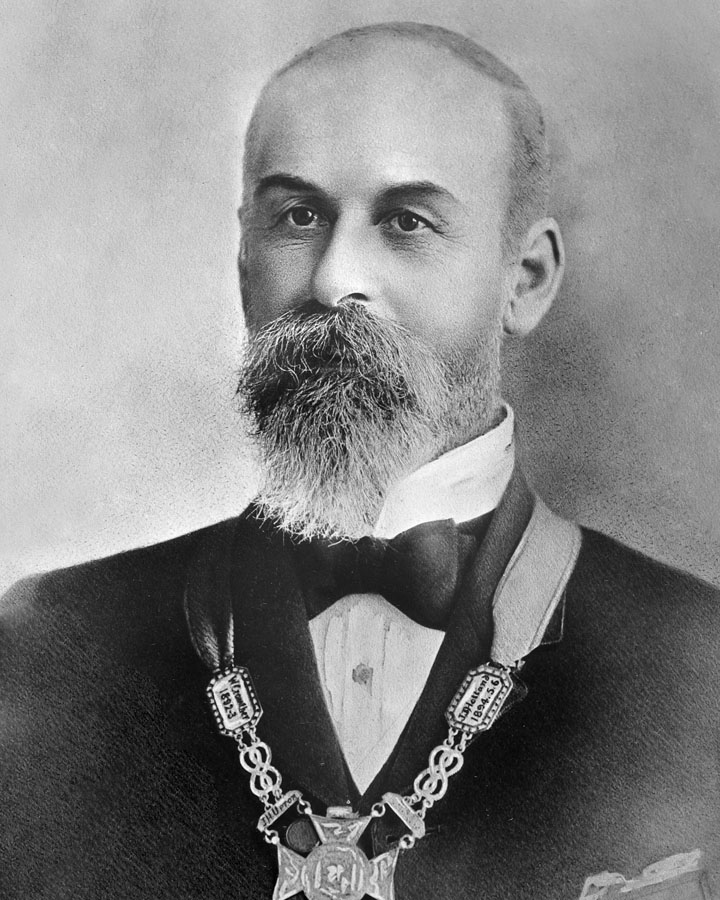

13th Mayor of Auckland City
- In office 20 December 1893 – 16 December 1896
- Preceded by: William Crowther
- Succeeded by: Abraham Boardman

Member of the New Zealand Parliament for City of Auckland
- In office 4 December 1896 – 6 December 1899
- Preceded by: Charles Button
- Succeeded by: William Joseph Napier

Personal details
- Born: 1841 Leicester, England
- Died: 31 August 1922 (aged 80–81) Auckland, New Zealand
- Party: Liberal
- Spouse: Agnes Melvin MacKenzie (m. 1864)

James Job Holland (1841 – 31 August 1922) was a Liberal Party Member of Parliament for the City of Auckland and mayor of the City of Auckland from 1893 to 1896.

== Biography ==
=== Early life ===
Born in Leicester, England, Holland trained as a builder under his father before emigrating to New Zealand in 1860, settling in Auckland in 1864 after spending time in the Otago gold fields and serving as a sergeant with the Militia in the Waikato during the New Zealand Wars. He established a building and contracting business, and was prominent in many civic and charitable bodies in Auckland. He was a member of Manchester Unity, an Oddfellow and a Freemason. In 1864, Holland married Agnes Melvin MacKenzie, daughter of Duncan MacKenzie, of Glasgow, and the couple went on to have three daughters and three sons. In 1900, Holland was president of the Auckland Builders and Contractors Union of Employers.

=== Political career ===
New Zealand Parliament
| Years | Term | Electorate | Party |
|---|---|---|---|
| 1896–1899 | 13th | City of Auckland | Liberal |

In 1886, Holland was elected as city councillor for the city's Eastern Ward. He also served two terms on the Auckland Harbour Board and was for some years a member of the Hospital Board. Later, in 1893 he was elected Mayor of Auckland City serving for three years.

He was elected to the City of Auckland multi-member electorate in 1896, but was defeated in 1899. He was also defeated in a 1900 by-election after the death of the sitting member William Crowther by Joseph Witheford, despite being endorsed by Seddon.

Upon defeat, Holland was subsequently appointed as a Government trustee to the Auckland Savings Bank. He also served as the chairman of the committee of St. John Ambulance Association.

=== Building career ===
Holland had a distinguished career as a builder and worked with architects such as Edward Mahoney and Edward Bartley. Some notable buildings he built are the Auckland Baptist Tabernacle, St Benedict's Church, Newton, and the Shakespeare Hotel.

=== Death ===
Holland died at his home in Auckland on 31 August 1922, and was buried at Purewa Cemetery.

== Notes ==
Political offices
| Preceded by William Crowther | Mayor of Auckland City; 1893–1896 | Succeeded by Abraham Boardman |
New Zealand Parliament
| Preceded by Charles Button | Member of Parliament for City of Auckland; 1896–1899; Served alongside: William Crowther, Thomas Thompson | Succeeded by William Joseph Napier |
