= Edmund Allen (politician) =

New Zealand politician (1844–1909)

The Honourable Edmund Giblett Allen
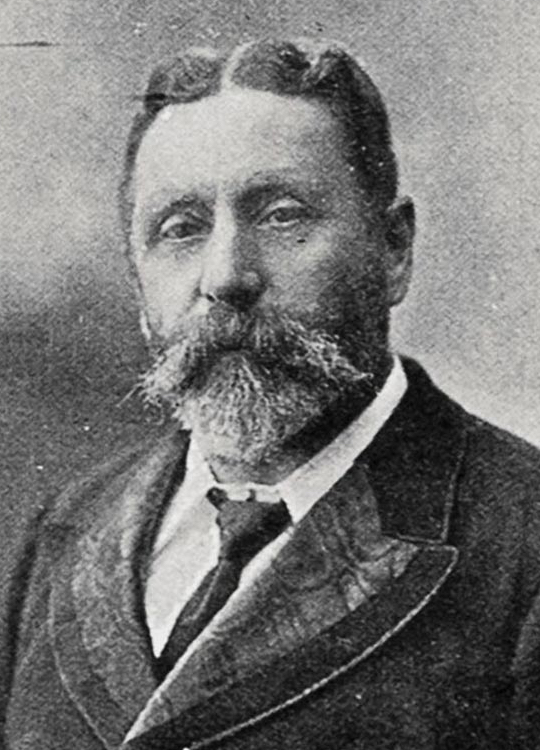

Member of the New Zealand Parliament for Waikouaiti
- In office 1896–1902
- Preceded by: James Green
- Succeeded by: Thomas Mackenzie

Member of the New Zealand Parliament for Chalmers
- In office 1902–1908
- Preceded by: John A. Millar
- Succeeded by: Edward Henry Clark

Personal details
- Born: 1844 United Kingdom
- Died: 1909 (aged 64–65) Port Chalmers, New Zealand
- Party: Liberal Party
- Occupation: Politician

Edmund Giblett Allen (1844–1909) was a Liberal Party Member of Parliament in New Zealand.

== Biography ==
New Zealand Parliament
Years	Term	Electorate	Party
1896–1899	13th	Waikouaiti	Liberal
1899–1902	14th	Waikouaiti	Liberal
1902–1905	15th	Chalmers	Liberal
1905–1908	16th	Chalmers	Liberal

He was elected to the Waikouaiti electorate in 1896, which he represented to 1902. In 1902 he was elected for the Chalmers electorate, which he represented until he was defeated in 1908. One newspaper described him as sensible and moderate.

His sister's wedding notice and his obituaries said he was from Somerset, but he was said to be a Lancashire lad when he entered Parliament. On 29 March 1844 an Edmund Allen was born in Salford. Another was baptised in the Shepton Mallett district, at Milton Clevedon, on 1 September 1844. He probably moved to Swansea, in Tasmania when he was ten and to Christchurch in 1863, where he was working as a contractor by 1871. He assisted with building the Hutt Valley Line in 1873, and then, in partnership with Samuel Kingstreet, built the Waipukurau to Takapau railway from 1874. They left Wellington in 1875 and moved to Port Chalmers, where they built the Main South Line section between Sawyer's Bay and Deborah Bay tunnel. Since the completion of that contract Mr Allen has owned a Port Chalmers quarry and farm near Dunback. He became a member of Port Chalmers Licensing Committee in 1882 and Mayor of Port Chalmers from 1884 to 1893, when he stood for Chalmers, but was defeated by John A. Millar. He was re-elected as mayor in 1895. In 1896 he was elected by a large majority for Waikouaiti. He was chairman of Otago Dock Trust, on Otago Harbour Board from 1888 and chairman of Port Chalmers District High School Committee.

== Personal life ==
He married Annie Reid on 21 October 1872. Annie died on 29 December 1907, aged 62. They had 3 sons and 2 daughters -

- Sydney Chalmers Allen (5 September 1877 - 10 June 1960), became a doctor in New Plymouth.
- Katie Annie was 3 years old, when she died on the same day Sydney was born.
- D. V. Allen, director of Zeehan School of Mines, Tasmania.
- H. K Allen, mining engineer, in South Africa.
- Ivy Ziele (born 1 March 1883) of Napier.

He had been in poor health for a year, when he died. He was buried at Port Chalmers Cemetery. Allen St, Northeast Valley, Dunedin was named after him. A plaque in Port Chalmers marks his part in opening the Otago Dock.

New Zealand Parliament
Vacant Constituency recreated after abolition in 1896 Title last held by John A. Millar	Member of Parliament for Chalmers; 1902–1908	Succeeded by Edward Clark
