= Gustave Tisch =

New Zealand mayor (1853–1911)

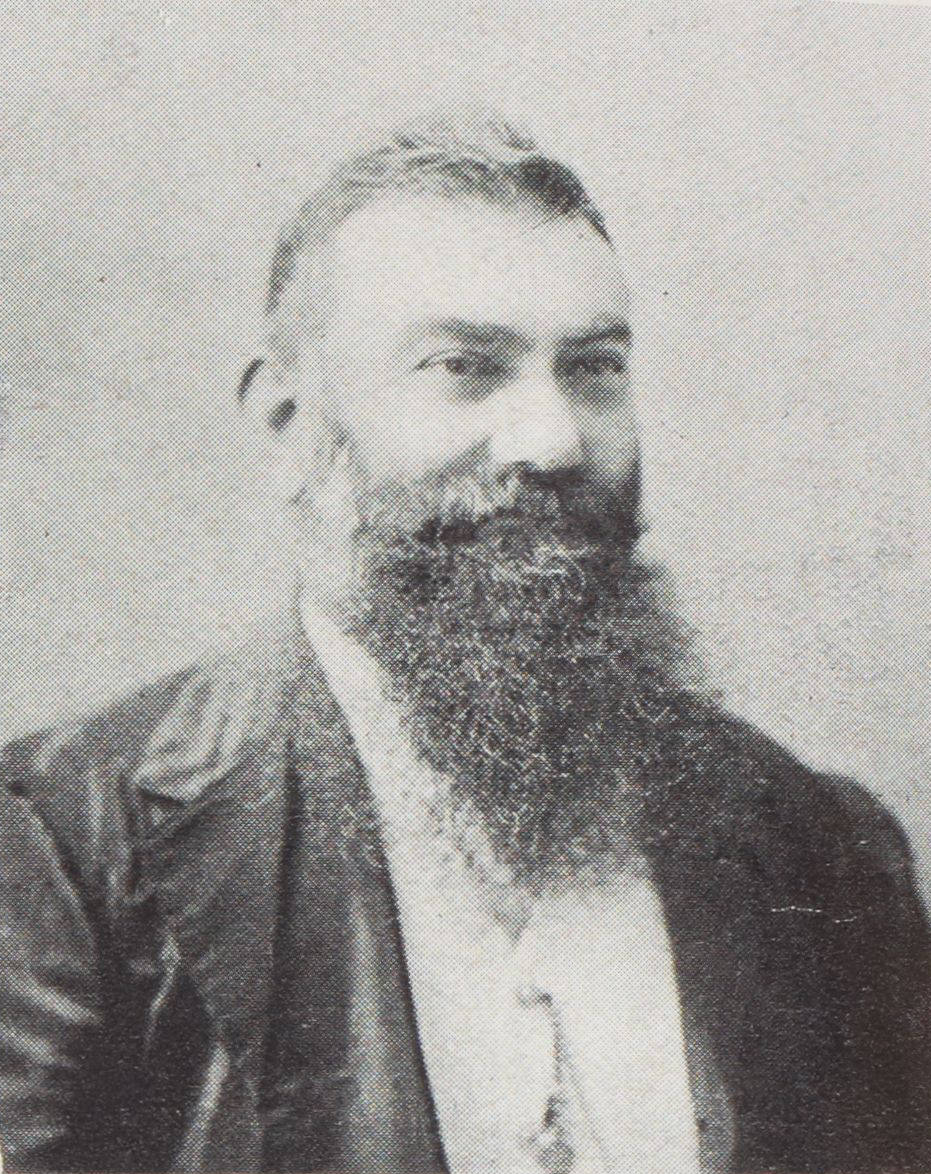
Tisch in c. 1911

Gustave Gardner Tisch (9 December 1853 – 10 August 1911) was a farmer, hotelkeeper, and the mayor of New Plymouth from 6 May 1908 until 10 August 1911, when he died in office.

== Early life ==
Tisch was born on 9 December 1853 in Christchurch to German parents. His father was Philip Tisch. He moved to Taranaki in 1878, moving from farming to running hotels in Stratford and Eltham, before taking over the Beach House Hotel in St Aubyn Street, New Plymouth, in 1882. He renamed it the Terminus and ran it for 14 years.

== Political career ==
Tisch became active in the community, with roles on the Education Board, New Plymouth Club, Seaside Improvement Society and Hospital board and he unsuccessfully stood for election to Parliament for the Taranaki electorate in the 1905 general election. One of five candidates, Tisch came fourth, beaten by the incumbent Liberal candidate Edward Smith, with Henry Okey and Charles Bellringer coming second and third, respectively.

He was elected mayor of New Plymouth Borough in 1908, replacing Edward Dockrill and continued to serve through 1909. Upon his re-election in 1910 he noted among his mayoral achievements the excellent state of the roads and the successful operation of electric lights in the town.

== Death ==
The popular mayor died on 10 August 1911 while still in office, casting a "gloom" over New Plymouth. His funeral was a large one with a procession including 49 vehicles following the hearse and a closure of many New Plymouth businesses and offices for part of the day.

== Legacy ==
After Tisch's death a memorial committee was formed – successfully raising over £100 for a "memorial avenue of trees and carriage drive", near the Kawaroa foreshore. It was named Tisch Avenue. At its opening in 1912, speakers talked about developing New Plymouth’s foreshore further and all the efforts Tisch had made to beautify the town.
