= 1907 Taranaki by-election =

New Zealand by-election

- 14 May 1907
- Turnout: 74.96%
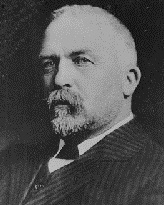

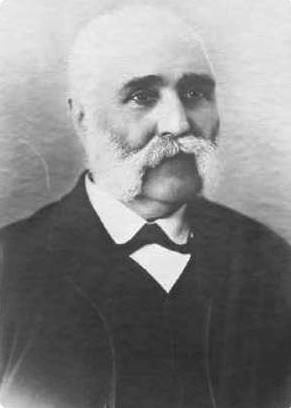

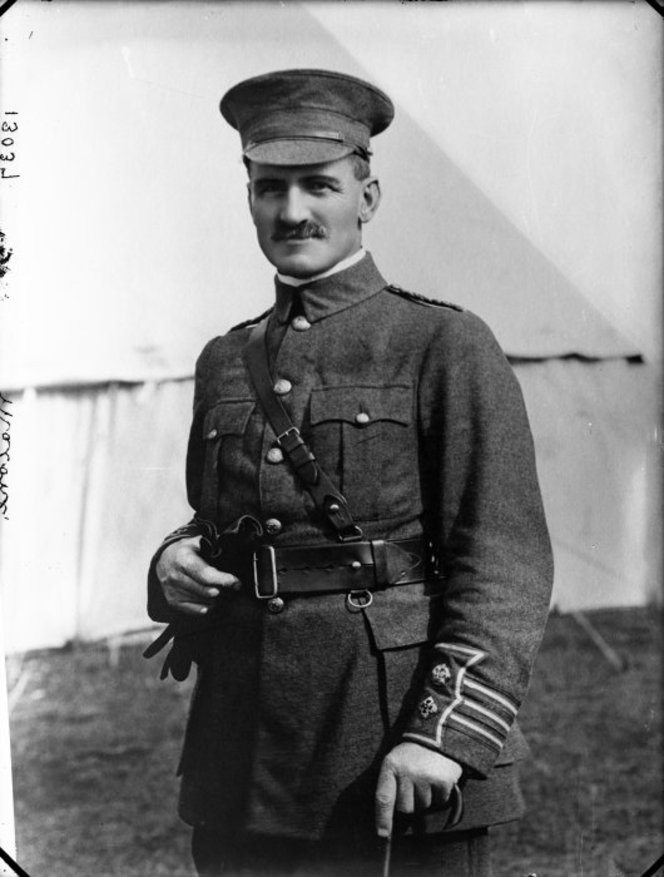
Candidate	Henry Okey	Edward Dockrill	William Malone
Party	Conservative	Liberal	Independent Liberal
Popular vote	1,991	1,627	1,010
Percentage	43.02	35.16	21.82
Member before election
Edward Smith
Liberal
Elected Member
Henry Okey
Conservative

The Taranaki by-election of 1907 was a by-election for the electorate of Taranaki held on 14 May 1907 during the 16th New Zealand Parliament.

== Background ==
The contest was triggered due to the death of incumbent MP Edward Smith. Three candidates stood; Henry Okey was the Conservative candidate, Edward Dockrill was the Liberal government endorsed candidate and William Malone an Independent Liberal Okey was the victor, resulting in the defeat of the Liberal Government's preferred candidate because of William Malone, a popular local "Independent Liberal" candidate splitting the government support vote. Because of the vote-splitting, the defeat of the Government candidate did not necessarily mean support for Opposition objection to the Land Bill then before Parliament.

== Results ==
The following table gives the election results:

1907 Taranaki by-election
Party	Candidate	Votes	%	±%
Conservative	Henry Okey	1,991	43.02	
Liberal	Edward Dockrill	1,627	35.16	
Independent Liberal	William Malone	1,010	21.82	
Majority		364	7.87	
Informal votes		23	0.50	
Turnout		4,651	74.96	
Registered electors		6,205		

Okey held the seat until his own death in 1918 which triggered the 1918 by-election which was won by Edward Smith's son Sydney. Okey was later to join the Reform Party upon its formation in February 1909. Malone was later notable during World War I, when he was killed in action leading his troops during the Gallipoli Campaign.
