= Dockrill =

Dockrill is a surname. Notable people with the surname include:

- Edward Dockrill (1838–1927), New Zealand politician
- Laura Dockrill (born 1986), English performance poet, author, illustrator and short story writer
- Michelle Dockrill (born 1959), politician from Nova Scotia, Canada
- Saki Dockrill (1952–2009), Japanese-British historian of modern international affairs
