= Henry Brown (New Zealand politician) =

New Zealand politician

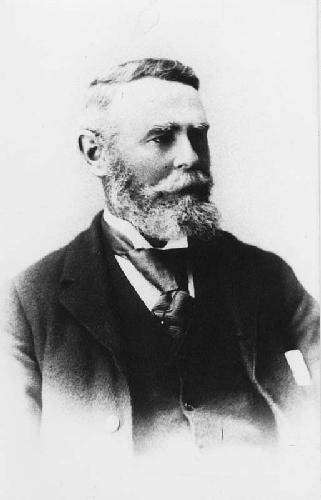
- Henry Brown (year unknown)

Member of the New Zealand Parliament for Taranaki
- In office 1896–1899
- Preceded by: In abeyance (last held by George Marchant)
- Succeeded by: Edward Smith

Personal details
- Born: 1842 Lincolnshire, England
- Died: 10 March 1921 (aged 78) Inglewood, New Zealand
- Party: Independent
- Spouse: Harriet Brown (née Brooking)

Henry Brown JP (1842 – 10 March 1921) was an independent conservative Member of Parliament in New Zealand. He was a prominent saw miller in the Taranaki Region.

== Early life ==
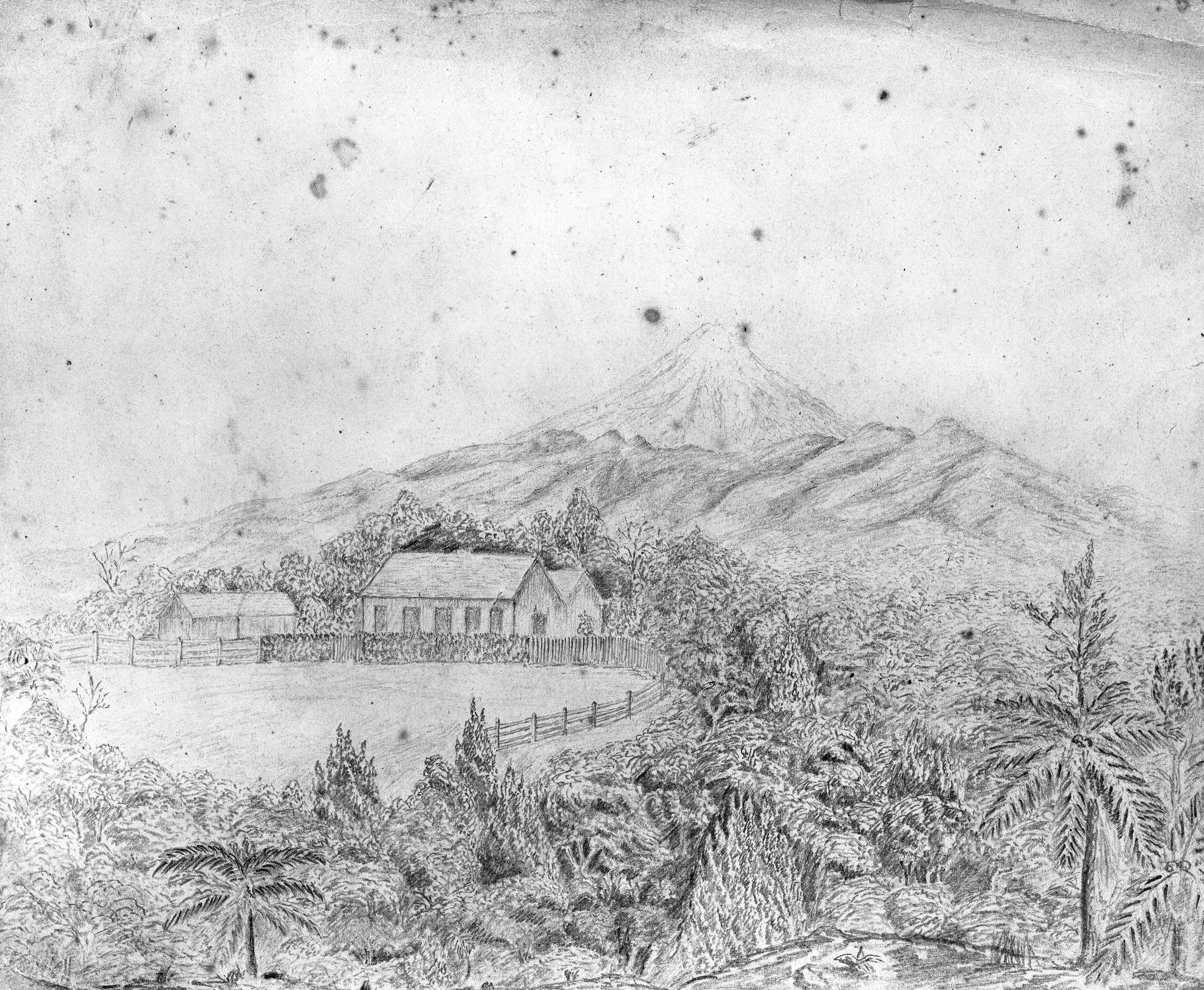
Brookwood, the home of the Rev. Henry Handley Brown, in Omata

Brown was born in 1842 in Lincolnshire, England. His parents were Sophia Brown and the Rev. Henry Handley Brown (1813–1893), who had been appointed to the Omata District by the Bishop Selwyn. In North Kesteven, the Reverend was Rector of Burton Pedwardine and Vicar of Howell, where his parishioners gave him £50 for land in the colony.

Henry Brown received his education in Neuwied, Germany and Lausanne, Switzerland. He arrived with his parents and siblings (Sophie, Francis 'Frank', Mary, Frances, Caroline, John, Thomas, and William) in New Plymouth on 4 March 1859 on the Eclipse and they settled in Omata. During the First Taranaki War, he served in the volunteers for about four years, and received the New Zealand Medal. When five settlers, including two boys, were either shot or tomahawked by Māori in the Omata district on 27 March 1860, the Browns were still in their house and felt safe, as church ministers were regarded as tapu or untouchable by the Māori. The events eventually led to the Battle of Waireka. The family relocated to Nelson, but the brothers Henry and Frank stayed behind to fight. They both fought at the Battle of Mahoetahi, where Frank was one of the two Pakeha settlers killed on 6 November 1860. Brown became an ensign in the Rifles in 1863, and in the militia became a lieutenant (1865) and then captain (1871).

In 1867, he married Harriet Brown (née Brooking), a daughter of John Brooking of New Plymouth, and they had one son and one daughter.

== Professional career ==
Brown was interested in the timber trade in the neighbourhood of New Plymouth for about ten years, and was one of the pioneers of Inglewood, where he established a timber mill in 1877, which became one of the largest mills in New Zealand. The main factory remained at Inglewood, but the head office was located in New Plymouth, where they also had a timber yard. Brown & Co was an important manufacturer of butter boxes used in the export of butter, and at the turn of the century they produced between 30,000 and 40,000 units annually.

== Political career ==
New Zealand Parliament
Years	Term	Electorate	Party
1896–1899	13th	Taranaki	Independent

For many years, Brown was chairman of the Inglewood Town Board, and he was a member of the Taranaki County Council (1876–1892).

In the 1896 election, he contested the newly established Taranaki electorate against the incumbent in the discontinued New Plymouth electorate, Edward Smith. Brown defeated Smith and served for one term until the 1899 election, when he was in turn defeated by Smith.

== Death ==
He died on 10 March 1921, aged 78, at his residence in Inglewood.

== Notes ==
New Zealand Parliament
In abeyance Title last held by George Marchant	Member of Parliament for Taranaki; 1896–1899	Succeeded by Edward Smith
