= William George Malone =

New Zealand military officer (1859–1915)

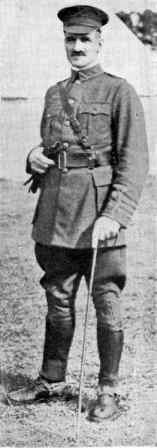
- Lieutenant Colonel William Malone
- Born: 24 January 1859; Kent, England
- Died: 8 August 1915 (aged 56); Chunuk Bair, Gallipoli, Ottoman Turkey
- Military career
- Allegiance: New Zealand
- Branch: New Zealand Military Forces
- Rank: Lieutenant colonel
- Commands: Wellington Infantry Battalion
- Conflicts: First World War; Gallipoli campaign; Battle of Chunuk Bair †
- Awards: Mentioned in Despatches (2)

Lieutenant Colonel William George Malone (24 January 1859 – 8 August 1915) was an officer in the New Zealand Expeditionary Force who served in the First World War. He commanded the Wellington Infantry Battalion during the Gallipoli Campaign, and was killed in action by friendly fire during the Battle of Chunuk Bair.

Born in England, Malone emigrated to New Zealand in 1880 and joined the New Zealand Armed Constabulary. After two years service in the Taranaki region, he worked at Ōpunake and later took up farming on land he bought with his brother near Stratford. He studied to become a lawyer and worked in New Plymouth in partnership with other lawyers but later set up his own practice in Stratford.

A volunteer in New Zealand's militia, he helped raise the Stratford Rifle Volunteers. When the militia was abolished and replaced with the Territorial Force, he was made commander of 11th Regiment (Taranaki Rifles). Following the outbreak of the First World War, he volunteered for service with the New Zealand Expeditionary Force and was appointed commander of the Wellington Infantry Battalion. He led the battalion through training in Egypt and during the Gallipoli Campaign until his death at Chunuk Bair in Gallipoli.

== Early life ==
William George Malone was born in Lewisham, then a village in Kent, England, the second of five children of Louisa and Thomas Malone. His father was a chemist who worked in London for the photography pioneer Henry Fox Talbot. Thomas Malone died in 1867 at the age of 44, which placed his family in reduced financial circumstances.

William Malone was initially educated at St. Joseph's College in Clapham, London before receiving further schooling at Marist boarding schools in both England and France, and becoming fluent in French. After completing his education in 1876, he became an office worker in London. His military career began with his enlistment with the City of Westminster Rifle Volunteers, and he also served for a time in the Royal Artillery Volunteers.

== Life in New Zealand ==
Malone immigrated to New Zealand in January 1880. His older brother, Austin, had previously moved to New Zealand and was serving in the New Zealand Armed Constabulary. A month after his arrival, Malone joined his brother in service with the Armed Constabulary. Both brothers were based at Ōpunake, in the Taranaki region. Malone took part in the storming of the village of Parihaka on 5 November 1881.

Malone left the Armed Constabulary after two years service and became involved in surfboats which unloaded cargo at Ōpunake. With his brother, who had left the Armed Constabulary in November 1880, he eventually bought a large block of bush country near Stratford and took up farming. Within a few years, his land had been converted into productive farmland. By this time, his mother and two sisters had also immigrated to New Zealand to join them in Stratford. He was also involved in the local military, the Stratford Rifles.

In 1886, Malone married Elinor Lucy (née Penn). The couple would eventually have five children, a daughter and four sons. As well as supporting his young family he found time to take an active role in the Stratford community. He was a member of the Hawera County Council as well as the Taranaki Hospital and Charitable Aid Board. From 1890, in addition to his farming, Malone also worked as a land agent. Later, he helped found the Stratford County Council and served as its first clerk and treasurer from 1891 to 1900.

Malone took up the study of law, becoming a solicitor in 1894 and a barrister five years later. In 1903, the same year that he and his family moved to New Plymouth, he formed a partnership dealing mostly with land transactions with James McVeagh and William Anderson. The partners would open several law offices around the Taranaki region.

On 18 June 1904, Malone suffered the loss of his wife Elinor in childbirth. Their baby son also died. The following year, Malone married Ida Katharine Withers, and would go on to have three more children. Ida had been a friend of Elinor's and had also tutored the Malone children.

Malone became politically active and unsuccessfully stood as an independent Liberal in a by-election for the Taranaki electorate in 1907; of the three candidates, he came last. The following year, Joseph Ward, the leader of the Liberal Party, invited Malone to be the party's candidate in the 1908 general election. He declined; Malone had views that in some respects were incompatible with those of the Liberal Party, and he instead stood as an independent. Although unsuccessful, he gained nearly 30% of the electorate vote. In both 1907 and 1908, he was defeated by the conservative politician Henry Okey, who was to hold the Taranaki electorate until his death in 1918.

In 1911, after selling his share of the law practice, Malone returned to Stratford. In November 1911, he started his own law firm and the following month took on another solicitor, Cyril Croker, as his clerk. With a reduced work load, Malone began focus on his other interests, which included the military. Malone participated in New Zealand's militia, the Volunteer Force. In 1900, he helped raise the Stratford Rifle Volunteers, one of many units formed in the enthusiasm for the military during the Second Boer War, with himself as its captain. When he moved to New Plymouth in 1903, he relinquished his command. As a result of a request by his Volunteer Force battalion commander, Malone was made adjutant of the 4th Battalion of the Wellington (Taranaki) Rifle Volunteers. In 1905 he was second-in-command and by 1910, and now a lieutenant-colonel, he was the commander of the battalion.

The following year, the Volunteer Force was abolished and replaced with the Territorial Force. Malone was placed in command of a new Territorial unit, the 11th Regiment (Taranaki Rifles). It was during this time that he introduced the use of the "lemon squeezer" hat to the Territorial Force. By having his troops push out its crown and indenting its sides, the hat mirrored the outline of Mount Taranaki, thereby providing a link for the regiment to its parent region, and, more practically, allowed rain to easily run off the hat. In later years, the lemon squeezer hat was formally adopted by the New Zealand Military Forces.

== First World War ==
Malone had been convinced for some time that war was on the horizon and prepared himself accordingly. He studied military history and practices intensively, and underwent a physical fitness and conditioning programme in preparation for military service. This reputedly included his sleeping on a military camp bed. Upon the outbreak of the First World War, he volunteered for service either in New Zealand or overseas. Well regarded by his superiors in the Territorial Force, he was made commander of the Wellington Infantry Battalion of the New Zealand Expeditionary Force (NZEF).

The battalion embarked from Wellington in October 1914 for Egypt, and upon arrival, was primarily engaged in training before it was deployed along the Suez Canal late in January 1915 to support Indian troops stationed to guard against a rumoured Turkish attack. Three weeks of sentry duty ensued for the battalion before it returned to Cairo.

=== Gallipoli ===
By this time, the New Zealand and Australian Division, under the command of Major General Alexander Godley, was being formed for operations in the Dardanelles, and the battalion was attached to the New Zealand Infantry Brigade, one of the two infantry brigades (the other was the Australian 4th brigade) that formed the bulk of the division. In April, the division, now part of the Australian and New Zealand Army Corps (ANZAC) embarked for Gallipoli. The Wellington Battalion was landed at Anzac Cove on the afternoon of 25 April, and made its way up to Plugge's Plateau.

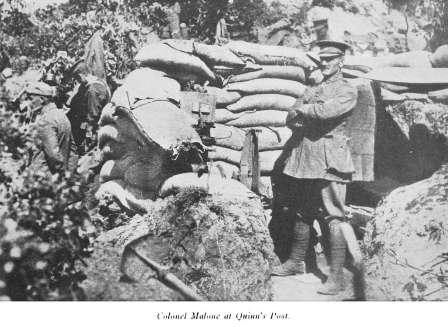
Colonel Malone at Quinn's Post, 1915

On 27 April, the battalion was called upon to reinforce positions held by the Australian 2nd Battalion along a feature that would later be known as Walker's Ridge. A Turkish counterattack had been launched, threatening the flank of the ANZAC position. By nightfall, Malone had established a new defensive line along the ridge although he was frustrated by the poor decisions by the commander of 2nd Battalion, Colonel George Braund. Malone believed Braund's actions had wasted the lives of his men. He consequently made a request to the acting commander of the New Zealand Infantry Brigade, Brigadier General Harold Walker that the Wellington Battalion take sole charge of the position, a request which was approved. In the following days, Malone worked his men hard to improve the defensive positions and ensure the stability of the Walker's Ridge positions.

In early May, the ANZAC positions had sufficiently stabilised such that the New Zealand Infantry Brigade was transferred to Cape Helles for operations there. Malone led his battalion during the Second Battle of Krithia, during which he came into conflict with his brigade commander, Colonel Francis Johnston, who had taken over command of the brigade from Walker. Johnston ordered a bayonet charge by the Wellington Battalion although Malone pointed out to Johnston the lack of flanking support for such a charge. Johnston was a British Army officer seconded to the NZEF, and in his private correspondence, Malone was beginning to express frustration at the inflexibility of such officers in the face of a fluid battlefield situation. Malone was later mentioned in despatches for his work at Cape Helles.

By late May, the brigade was back at ANZAC Cove and in reserve. On 1 June, the Wellington Battalion moved into the front lines, taking over Courtney's Post, previously held by the Australian 4th Brigade. Malone was post commander, and it was planned that he would stay in command at Courtney's Post while his battalion rotated with the Otago Infantry Battalion in eight-day spells. He immediately set about improving the position, which overlooked the Turkish lines. As well as rectifying the position's neglected field works, he established a squad of snipers and this proved instrumental in gaining ascendency over the Turks in no-man's land.

Malone had impressed his senior commanders with his efforts at Courtney's Post and on 9 June the Wellington Battalion was tasked with holding Quinn's Post, previously held by the Auckland and Canterbury Infantry Battalions, both of which were exhausted from offensive operations. Quinn's was a more exposed position than Courtney's and had been neglected defensively. With the Turkish trenches often only 10 metres (33 ft) away, Quinn's Post was a weak spot in the ANZAC lines. Malone immediately set about rectifying this. Terraces and dugouts were built and extensive sandbagging protecting the previously exposed areas of the position were erected. He implemented measures to dominate the no-man's land between the opposing forces at Quinn's, ordering construction of machine gun posts and loops to try and increase his men's ability to direct firepower onto the enemy. Although he placed high demands on his men, he was well respected for he also showed concern and interest in their welfare. His efforts at Quinn's Post did not go unrecognised. The commander of the ANZAC Corps, General William Birdwood complimented Malone on his work.

=== Battle of Chunuk Bair ===
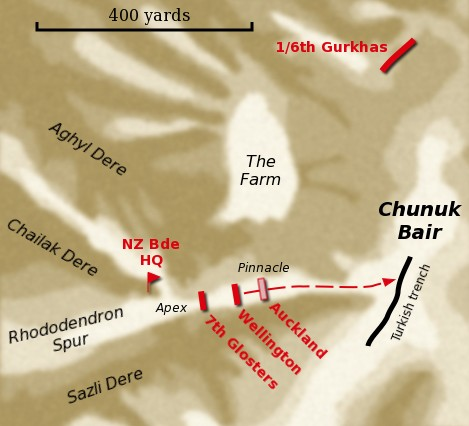
The plan for the assault on Chunuk Bair, 8 August

In August, plans were in place for the Allied forces to break out of the ANZAC foothold. Key to this was seizing the Sari Bair Range. On 7 August, the New Zealand Infantry Brigade commenced its assault on Chunuk Bair, the crest of the range, along what was known as Rhododendron Ridge. However, delays in getting the infantry battalions to their starting positions meant that the attack was launched in daylight rather than in the planned night time attack. As a result, heavy losses were incurred amongst the Auckland Battalion when it attacked at 10:30am. Johnston, still in command of the brigade despite being clearly unfit for it, then ordered Malone to take his battalion forward. According to Christopher Pugsley, writing in 1984, Malone refused, arguing that his battalion could take Chunuk Bair that night.

However, in 2018, New Zealand military historian Ian McGibbon challenged the "myth" that Malone refused a direct order to make a daytime attack. He states that Malone and Johnston both disagreed with the order from Godley, the divisional commander, for the Auckland Battalion to attack in daylight. Johnston had acquiesced and ordered the attack to proceed. McGibbon said that the claim that Malone refused his superior officer's orders was based solely on the 1981 recollections of Charlie Clark, then aged 93. According to Clark, a soldier in the Wellington Battalion who was present at the battle, immediately after the failed attack by the Aucklanders, Malone advised his commander that he was not taking the Wellington Battalion up the hill in daylight. McGibbon argues that Clark was in fact referring to an argument Malone had earlier in the day with Johnston's brigade major, Major Arthur Temperley, who was junior to Malone. At dawn, when the Wellington Battalion first arrived at Rhododendron Ridge, Temperley wanted Malone to take his men up the slope to Chunuk Bair. It was this request that Malone refused, preferring to establish defensive positions instead while awaiting nightfall.

In the early hours of 8 August, supported by the 7th Battalion of the Gloucesters and by extensive artillery and naval fire, the Wellington Battalion succeeded in capturing Chunuk Bair with relatively little resistance. By this stage, Malone's battalion was the only intact battalion in the New Zealand Infantry Brigade. He set about securing the crest of Chunuk Bair, but it proved difficult to deepen the relatively shallow Turkish trenches that had been captured by his men, and the work was made even more difficult as the sun rose, allowing the Turks on neighbouring Hill Q to focus their gunfire on the positions occupied by the Wellingtons. The Gloucesters, also on the crest, were forced to retreat to the reverse slope. The Turkish gunfire caused heavy casualties amongst the infantry holding Chunuk Bair, but crucially also prevented substantive reinforcements from reaching the crest in daylight. Instead, those soldiers that made it up Chunuk Bair tended to be positioned on its rearward slopes and thus had difficulty observing any approaches made by the Turks. Malone continued to co-ordinate the defences but a portion of the crest was lost. He remained in constant action, and led bayonet charges to counter numerous Turkish attacks. The trenches on the crest became filled with the bodies of dead, further reducing what little cover was available.

In the early evening, at around 5 pm, Malone was killed in his headquarters trench by friendly fire, either from supporting artillery or possibly naval gunfire. Reinforcements, in the form of the Otago Battalion and two squadrons of the Wellington Mounted Rifles arrived later that evening, and the remnants of Malone's battalion withdrew, having suffered 690 men killed or wounded of its original complement of 760. Malone, along with 300 of his men, has no known grave. Two days later, Chunuk Bair, now held by British units, was lost to the Turks. With the battalion out of the line, a memorial service for Malone was held on 21 August. The service was attended by nearly all of the surviving men of the battalion. Malone was also mentioned in despatches for his leadership during the August offensive.

Malone was survived by his wife Ida and his eight children. Although initially well provided with income from his farming estate, the depression of the 1920s impacted on the earnings of the farmland and Ida struggled financially. She eventually moved to England with her three children and a daughter from Malone's previous marriage and died there in 1946. His four oldest sons all served in the NZEF, and one, Maurice, was awarded the Distinguished Conduct Medal during the Sinai and Palestine Campaign. Another son, Edmond, received the Military Cross while serving with the Wellington Regiment on the Western Front; he died on 6 April 1918, a few days after being wounded.

== Legacy ==
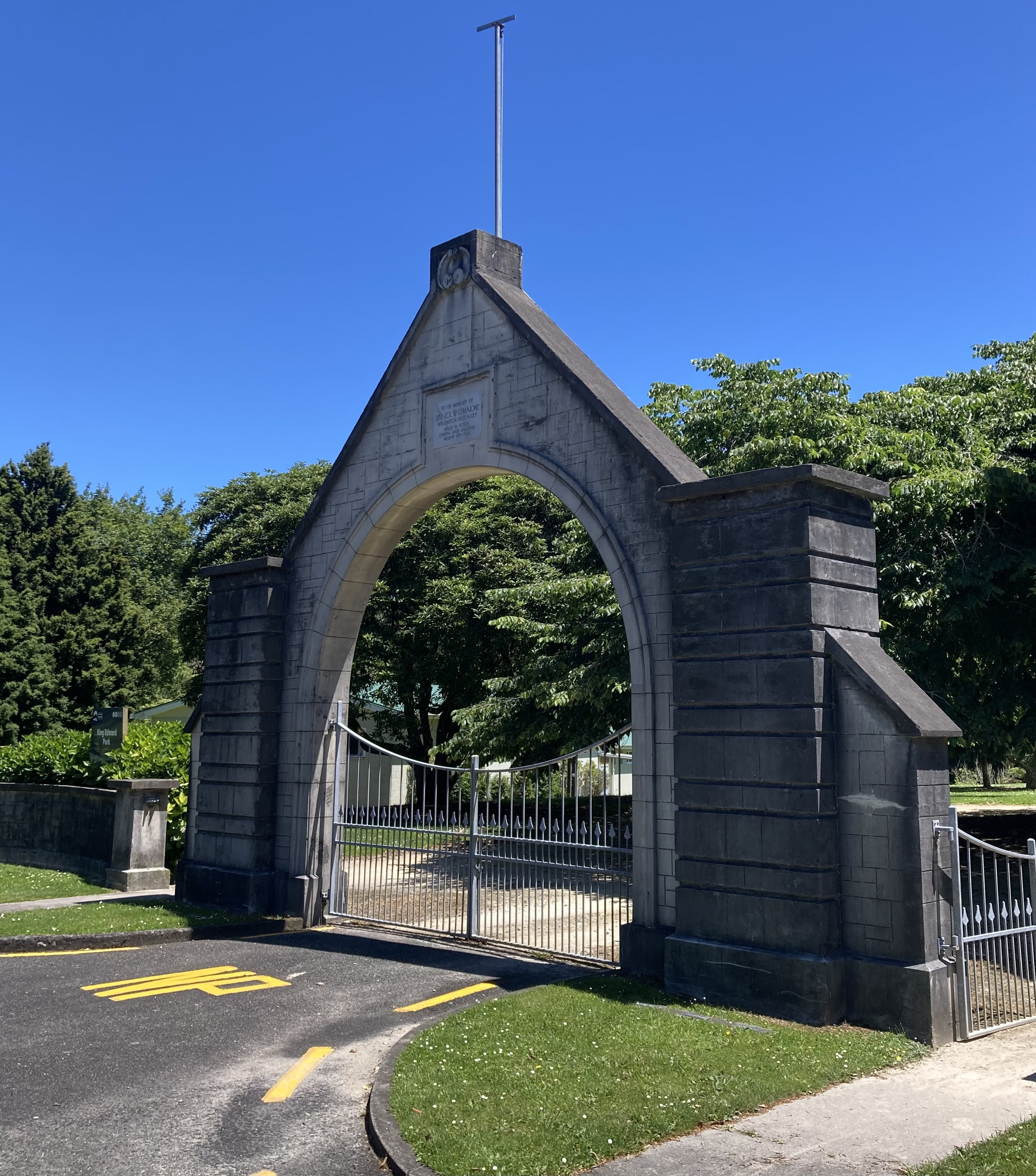
Malone Memorial Gates at the entrance to King Edward Park in Stratford, Taranaki.

After the Battle of Chunuk Bair, while his bravery was not questioned, Malone initially came in for criticism of his handling of the defences, particularly the placement of his defence trenches. In the planning for the battle, and earlier in the Gallipoli Campaign, he had clashed with Major Arthur Temperley, Johnston's brigade major. Temperley, a British Army officer like Johnston, was one of the foremost critics of Malone's defensive arrangements and may have unduly influenced the subsequent official reports on the battle. However, recent studies have demonstrated that this criticism was misplaced and there were a number of crucial failures higher up in the chain of command. In particular, Johnston's delay in getting reinforcements to Chunuk Bair once it was captured likely led to the failure to hold the gains made by Malone's battalion.

In New Zealand, Malone's death was widely reported and keenly felt, particularly in the Taranaki region. The soldiers of the Wellington Regiment held their former commander in high regard and paid for the construction of the Malone Memorial Gates, at the entrance to King Edward Park in Stratford. The gates are one of New Zealand's largest war memorials commemorating an individual soldier. Designed by architects Duffil & Gibson they were officially opened on 8 August 1923 in front of a large crowd. The gate is the scene of an annual ceremony held on 8 August to commemorate the memory of Malone. A fictionalised colonel based on Malone was a major character in a 1982 play written by Maurice Shadbolt, Once on Chunuk Bair, which told the story of the Wellington Battalion's battle of 8 August. In 1992, the play was filmed as Chunuk Bair. A plaque in his honour was unveiled in the New Zealand Parliament's Grand Hall in 2005. Malone's Memorial Plaque is held in the collection of the Museum of New Zealand Te Papa Tongarewa.
