= George Marchant (politician) =

New Zealand politician (1849–1943)

New Zealand Parliament
Years	Term	Electorate	Party
1887–1890	10th	Taranaki	Independent

George Albert Marchant (1849 – 24 January 1943) was a New Zealand politician who served as a Member of Parliament.

== Biography ==
Marchant was born in 1849 in London to parents from Devonshire. He received his education at King's College School in Wimbledon. Emigrating first to Australia, he came to New Zealand in 1872. He lived initially in Kakaramea, and moved to Cardiff near Stratford in 1881, where he lived for the remaining six decades of his life. Marchant was a pioneering dairy farmer.

He represented the Taranaki electorate from 1887 to 1890, when he retired.

Marchant married Esther Foreman from Alton in 1878. They were to have seven sons. One of his brothers, Frederick, was the engineer in charge of the construction of Timaru and Oamaru harbours. Marchant died on 24 January 1943 in Stratford. His wife had died in 1922.

New Zealand Parliament
Preceded by Robert Trimble	Member of Parliament for Taranaki; 1887–1890	In abeyance Title next held by Henry Brown
