= Mayor of New Plymouth =

Elected position in New Zealand

- Incumbent; Max Brough since 2025
- Style: His/Her Worship
- Term length: Three years, renewable
- Inaugural holder: Arthur Standish
- Formation: 1876
- Salary: $160,757
- Website: Official website

The mayor of New Plymouth officiates over the New Plymouth District Council in New Zealand. Since the 2022 local elections, the mayor is elected directly using the single transferable vote electoral system; prior to that, first-past-the-post voting was used. The current mayor is Max Brough.

== List of office holders ==
New Plymouth has had 27 mayors:

	Name	Portrait	Term
1	Arthur Standish		1876–1878
2	Albert Cracroft Fookes		1878–1879
3	James Davidson		1879–1881
4	William Bayly		1881–1884
5	James Paul		1884–1886
(4)	William Bayly		1886–1888
6	John Barton Roy		1888–1889
7	James Bellringer		1889–1893
(6)	John Barton Roy		1893–1897
8	Edward Dockrill		1897–1903
9	Richard Cock		1903–1906
(8)	Edward Dockrill		1906–1908
10	Gustave Tisch		1908–1911
11	George William Browne		1911–1914
12	J. E. Wilson		1914–1915
13	Charles Hayward Burgess		1915–1919
14	James Clarke		1919–1920
15	Frank Edwin Wilson		1920–1927
16	Victor Griffiths		1927–1933
17	Everard Gilmour		1933–1953
18	Edward Hill		1953–1956
19	Alfred Honnor		1956–1968
20	Denis Sutherland		1968–1980
21	David Lean		1980–1992
22	Claire Stewart		1992–2001
23	Peter Tennent		2001–2010
24	Harry Duynhoven		2010–2013
25	Andrew Judd		2013–2016
26	Neil Holdom		2016–2025
27	Max Brough		2025–present

=== List of deputy mayors ===
Name	Term	Mayor
James Bellringer	1901	Dockrill
W. F. Brooking	1901–?	Dockrill
W. F. Brooking	1904–?	–
W. F. Brooking	1905–?	Cock
Cr. Wilson	1906–?	Dockrill
Unknown	c. 1906–1911	–
George William Browne	1911	Tisch
James Clarke	1911–1914	Browne
James Clarke	1911–1914	Wilson
W. A. Collis	1914–1920	Wilson
W. A. Collis	1914–1920	Burgess
W. A. Collis	1914–1920	Clarke
Frederick John Hill	1920–1921	Wilson
James Kibby	fl.1922–1923	Wilson
Victor Griffiths	1923–1927	Wilson
Sydney George Smith	fl.1928–1930	Griffiths
Frank Amoore	1930–?	Griffiths
Unknown	c. 1930–c. 1935	–
Percy Stainton	fl.1935–1938	Gilmour
Francis Stanley Grayling	1938–1943	Gilmour
Clinton Henry Wynyard	1943–1944	Gilmour
Francis Stanley Grayling	1944–1947 (Note: The Wanganui Chronicle incorrectly records Grayling as 'F. F. Drayling' in 1946.) (Note: Wynyard is noted as being deputy mayor in December 1945, however, by January 1946, Grayling is noted as deputy mayor. A newspaper article from 1947 stated that Grayling was "chosen as deputy mayor in June, 1944, and is still in that office." This suggests that the inclusion as Wynyard as deputy mayor in December 1945 may have been an error, however, this remains unconfirmed.)	Gilmour
Richard John Pentecost	1947–1950	Gilmour
George Fry	1950–1953	Gilmour
Alfred Honnor	1953–1956	Hill
William Dean	1956–1965	Honnor
Royden Burkitt	1965–1968	Honnor
Edmund Allen	1968–1974	Sutherland
Royden Burkitt	1974–1980	Sutherland
Ron Barclay	1980–1989	Lean
Thomas Watson	1989–1992	Lean
Thomas Beeby	1992–1994	Stewart
W David Wilkinson	1994–1995	Stewart
Brian Bellringer	1995–1998	Stewart
Peter Tennent	1998–2001	Stewart
Lynn Bublitz	2001–2007	Tennent
Alex Matheson	2007–2013	Tennent
Alex Matheson	2007–2013	Duynhoven
Heather Dodunski	2013–2016	Judd
Craig McFarlane	2016–2017	Holdom
Richard Jordan	2017–2022	Holdom
David Bublitz	2022–2025	Holdom
Murray Chong	2025–April 2026	Brough
Moira George	May 2026–present	Brough

== Deaths in office ==
James Clarke died in New Zealand's second fatal air crash while in office; when the three occupants of the plane he was in were killed on 11 November 1920. Clarke had foreshadowed that he intended to resign from the mayoralty that evening.

Frank Edwin Wilson died in office on 14 November 1927; the cause of death was believed to be cerebral meningitis. The deputy mayor, Victor Griffiths, was subsequently elected unopposed to the position of mayor on 6 December 1927.

Gustave Tisch also died while in office as the result of an illness.

James Bellringer died in 1901 whilst in the position of deputy mayor. Bellringer was not present at the Borough Council meeting on 10 June 1901 and, in his absence, was elected deputy mayor, due to his seniority. He died roughly a week later.
