= Charles Bellringer =

New Zealand politician (1864–1944)

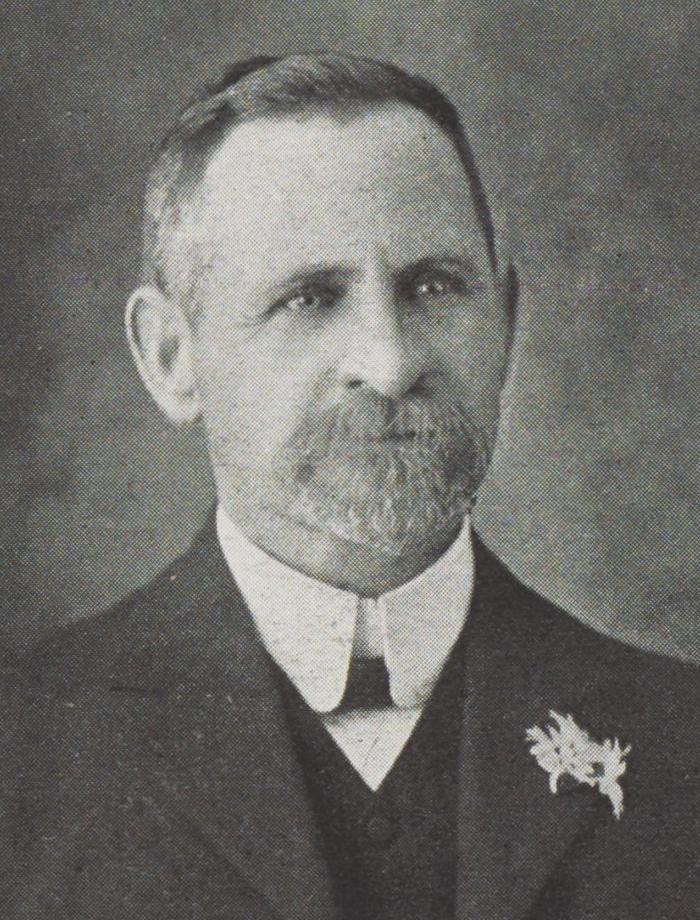
Bellringer, c. 1911

Charles Emanuel Bellringer (1864–1944) was a Reform Party Member of Parliament, serving one three-year term. He unsuccessfully stood in general elections five times, the first three of those for the Liberal Party. He lived his whole life in New Plymouth and was involved with many organisations, most notably as chairman of the New Plymouth Harbour Board, as a prohibitionist, and one of the co-founders of the Methodist Church of New Zealand. He took over his father's company and was its executive director.

== Early life ==
Bellringer was born in New Plymouth in 1864. His father, James Bellringer, was mayor of New Plymouth from 1889 to 1893. Bellringer junior received his education at the local government school, followed by some private education. He commenced working for his father, painting and decorating houses. From 1897 to 1902, he was town clerk in New Plymouth. His father's death in December 1901 made him return to the family business, where he was later governing director for the Bellringer brothers.

== Memberships and local politics ==
Bellringer was a member of the New Plymouth Borough Council, and for many years a member of the harbour board, including its chairman. He was also on school committees and on the fire board. He was on the board of Pukekura Park, including its chairman. He held positions with the Independent Order of Oddfellows Manchester Unity. Bellringer was active in the Primitive Methodist Church, and helped establish the Methodist Church of New Zealand. He was a prohibitionist active at both the regional and national level. Together with other prohibitionists, he became associated with the Taranaki Daily News to further their views.

== Parliamentary career ==
New Zealand Parliament
Years	Term	Electorate	Party
1925–1928	22nd	Taranaki	Reform

Bellringer unsuccessfully stood for the Liberal Party in the Taranaki electorate in the 1905, 1908, and 1911 general elections. In the 1922 general election, he stood in this electorate for the Reform Party, but was again unsuccessful, this time defeated by Sydney George Smith.

Bellringer won the Taranaki electorate from the Liberals—beating Smith—in the 1925 general election, but was defeated by Smith in 1928. The Taranaki electorate was abolished in 1928, and replaced by New Plymouth.

== Private life ==
Bellringer married Laura Ward (1865–1925) in 1887; they were to have six sons.

In 1935, he was awarded the King George V Silver Jubilee Medal. Bellringer died on 9 December 1944 at New Plymouth aged 80.

New Zealand Parliament
Preceded by Sydney George Smith	Member of Parliament for Taranaki; 1925–1928	In abeyance Title next held by David Thomson
