= 1918 Taranaki by-election =

New Zealand by-election

- 10 October 1918
- Turnout: 74.19%
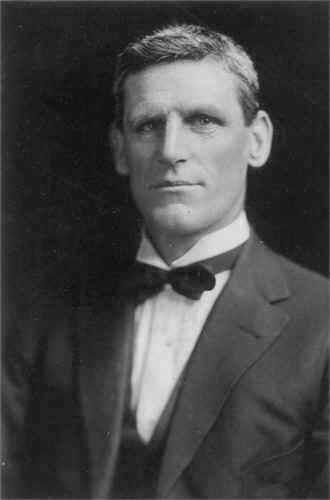

Candidate	Sydney George Smith	John Connett
Party	Independent Labour	Reform
Popular vote	2,840	2,680
Member before election
Henry Okey
Reform
Elected Member
Sydney George Smith
Independent Labour

The Taranaki by-election of 1918 was a by-election in the Taranaki electorate on the west coast of the North Island. It was held during the 19th New Zealand Parliament, on 10 October 1918. It was caused by the death of incumbent MP Henry Okey of the Reform Party and was won by Sydney George Smith, the son of previous Taranaki MP Edward Smith, who stood as an independent Labour candidate. Smith supported the war effort unlike most Labour politicians, gaining him support of voters who likewise supported the war.

== Result ==
The following table gives the election results:

1918 Taranaki by-election
Party	Candidate	Votes	%	±%
Independent Labour	Sydney George Smith	2,840	51.44	
Reform	John Connett	2,680	48.55	
Majority		160	2.89	
Turnout		5,520	74.19	−12.62
