= Taranaki (electorate) =

Taranaki was a New Zealand parliamentary electorate that existed for three periods between 1881 and 1996. It was represented by nine Members of Parliament.

== Population centres ==
The previous electoral redistribution was undertaken in 1875 for the 1875–1876 election. In the six years since, New Zealand's European population had increased by 65%. In the 1881 electoral redistribution, the House of Representatives increased the number of European representatives to 91 (up from 84 since the 1875–76 election). The number of Māori electorates was held at four. The House further decided that electorates should not have more than one representative, which led to 35 new electorates being formed, including Taranaki, and two electorates that had previously been abolished to be recreated. This necessitated a major disruption to existing boundaries.

The original area included the townships of Ōhura, Waitara, and Inglewood. The Mōkau River was used as the northern boundary. In the 1887 electoral redistribution, the northern boundary moved north, most of it as yet unsurveyed land. The settlements of Mōkau and Awakino were included in the newly gained area to the north, and Stratford was gained in the south.

In the 1896 electoral redistribution, rapid population growth in the North Island required the transfer of three seats from the South Island to the north. Four electorates that previously existed were re-established, including Taranaki, and three electorates were established for the first time. The New Plymouth electorate was abolished, the Egmont electorate shifted north, and the Patea electorate shifted east. This made room for the Hawera and Taranaki electorates.

== History ==
The electorate existed from 1881 to 1890, from 1896 to 1928, and from 1978 (replacing Stratford) to 1996. In 1996 it was combined with the adjacent King Country to form the Taranaki-King Country electorate.

The first representative was Robert Trimble from 1881 to 1887, who had earlier represented Grey and Bell. The second representative was George Marchant.

=== Members of Parliament ===
Taranaki was represented by nine Members of Parliament.

Key

Independent Liberal Reform

Independent Labour Liberal–Labour National

Election	Winner
1881 election	Robert Trimble
1884 election	Robert Trimble
1887 election	George Marchant
(Electorate abolished 1890–1896)
1896 election	Henry Brown
1899 election	Edward Smith
1902 election	Edward Smith
1905 election	Edward Smith
1907 by-election	Henry Okey
1908 election	Henry Okey
1911 election	Henry Okey
1914 election	Henry Okey
1918 by-election	Sydney Smith
1919 election	Sydney Smith
1922 election	Sydney Smith
1925 election	Charles Bellringer
(Electorate abolished 1928–1978)
1978 election	David Thomson
1981 election	David Thomson
1984 election	Roger Maxwell
1987 election	Roger Maxwell
1990 election	Roger Maxwell
1993 election	Roger Maxwell
(Electorate abolished in 1996; see Taranaki-King Country)

== Election results ==
=== 1925 election ===
1925 general election: Taranaki
Party	Candidate	Votes	%	±%
Reform	Charles Bellringer	4,615	46.28	
Liberal	Sydney George Smith	4,565	45.78	
Labour	William Sheat	792	7.94	
Majority		50	0.50	
Informal votes		56	0.56	
Turnout		10,028	92.79	
Registered electors		10,807		

=== 1918 by-election ===
1918 Taranaki by-election
Party	Candidate	Votes	%	±%
Independent Labour	Sydney George Smith	2,840	51.44	
Reform	John Connett	2,680	48.55	
Majority		160	2.89	
Turnout		5,520	74.19	−12.62

=== 1907 by-election ===
1907 Taranaki by-election
Party	Candidate	Votes	%	±%
Conservative	Henry Okey	1,991	43.02	
Liberal	Edward Dockrill	1,627	35.16	
Independent Liberal	William Malone	1,010	21.82	
Majority		364	7.87	
Informal votes		23	0.50	
Turnout		4,651	74.96	
Registered electors		6,205		

=== 1899 election ===
1899 general election: Taranaki
Party	Candidate	Votes	%	±%
Liberal	Edward Smith	2,405	51.36	+7.03
Conservative	Henry Brown	2,278	48.64	+1.91
Majority		127	2.71	+0.30
Turnout		4,683	82.46	+5.88
Registered electors		5,679		
