= John Barton Roy =

New Zealand politician (1854–1926)

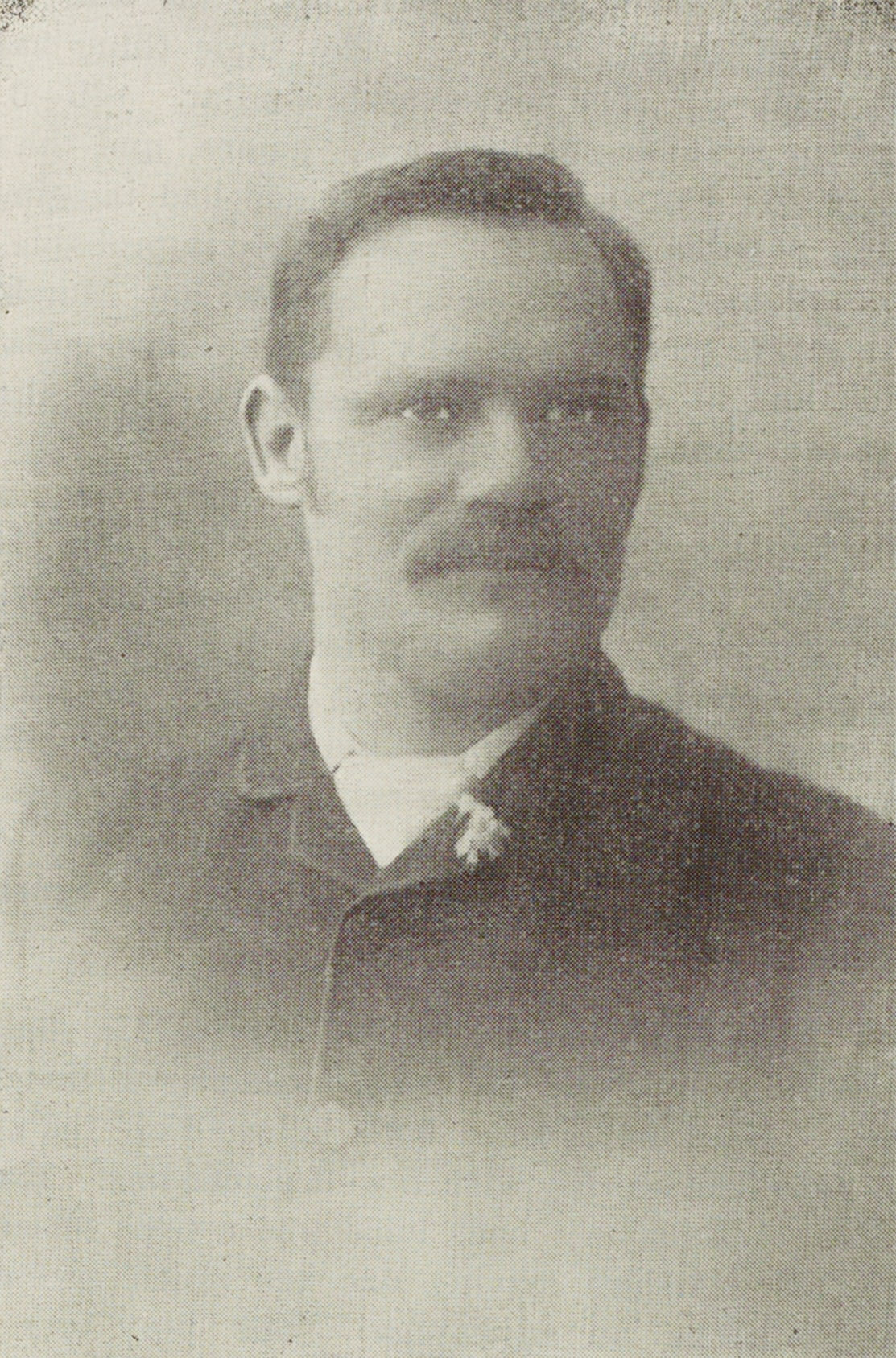
- Born: 26 May 1854; Trentham, New Zealand
- Died: 1 March 1926 (aged 71)
- Other name: John Richard Barton Roy
- Known for: Mayor of New Plymouth

John Barton Roy (26 May 1854 – 1 March 1926) was a New Zealand lawyer and politician. He served as the 6th mayor of New Plymouth, elected twice to office. Born in Trentham he was the grandson of Richard Barton, pioneer settler to New Zealand.

== Life ==
John Barton Roy was born at Trentham, near Wellington, and was educated at the Otago High School, and also at Nelson College. He was trained for the legal profession in Nelson, where he was admitted a barrister and solicitor of the Supreme Court, in December, 1876.

In 1879, he began practising as a solicitor in New Plymouth, and was a legal adviser to a considerable number of local bodies. Roy has been closely associated with the institutions of Taranaki, and took a deep interest in education.

Roy was first elected as Mayor of New Plymouth on 19 December 1888, and was elected again on 26 December 1893, remaining in term until 25 November 1897. He had previously served as a councillor of the borough of New Plymouth for three years.

In 1889 he became a member of the Board of Governors of the New Plymouth High School, and occupied the chair for five years. He later established his own firm of Roy and Wilson, where he was Senior Partner.

== Family ==
Roy was the son of John Roy and Mary Barton who married in 1853. Mary was the daughter of Richard Barton, an early settler of New Zealand and the Wellington Province.
