= Saki Dockrill =

Japanese-British historian

Professor Saki Ruth Dockrill (Japanese: サキ・ドクリル), née Saki Kimura (14 December 1952 – 8 August 2009) was a Japanese-British historian of modern international affairs, and Professor at King's College London.

Born in Kyoto, she obtained an LLM from Kyoto University in 1976, a master's in International Relations from the University of Sussex in 1982, and then joined the Department of War Studies at King's College London where she did her PhD on West Germany and its relationship with NATO. Her thesis was later published as Britain's Policy for West German Rearmament, 1950-1955. She then moved to be one of the first Olin Fellows at Yale University for the 1988–89 year, where she studied especially resources in the Eisenhower Presidential Library.

Dockrill returned to Britain and King's College London, as MacArthur Fellow in and lecturer from 1992, as senior lecturer from 1997, and from April 2003, as professor of Contemporary History and International Security.

Dockrill married Michael Dockrill c. 1985. She gained British citizenship in 1993. She died of cancer in 2009.

== Bibliography ==
- Dockrill, Saki (1991). Britain's policy for West German rearmament, 1950-1955. Cambridge, England: Cambridge University Press. ISBN 9780521381116. OCLC 21227289.
- Dockrill, Saki (1996). Eisenhower's new-look national security policy, 1953-61. Houndmills, Basingstoke, Hampshire: Macmillan Press. ISBN 9780333656556. OCLC 34321108.
- Saki, Dockrill (2002). Britain's retreat from east of Suez : the choice between Europe and the world?. Houndmills, Basingstoke, Hampshire: Palgrave Macmillan. ISBN 9780333732366. OCLC 48966761.
- Saki, Dockrill (2005). The end of the Cold War era : the transformation of the global security order. London: Hodder Arnold. ISBN 9780340740323. OCLC 60667883.

=== Edited ===
- Dockrill, Saki, ed. (1994). From Pearl Harbor to Hiroshima : the Second World War in Asia and the Pacific. Palgrave Macmillan. ISBN 9781349231317. OCLC 935190377.
- Dockrill, Saki, ed. (1998). Controversy and compromise : alliance politics between Great Britain, Federal Republic of Germany, and the United States of America, 1945-1967. Bodenheim, Germany: Philo. ISBN 9783825700935. OCLC 61350936.
- Geraint, Hughes; Dockrill, Saki, eds. (2006). Palgrave advances in Cold War history. Basingstoke, England: Palgrave Macmillan. ISBN 9781403934468. OCLC 62889164.
- Bischof, Günter; Dockrill, Saki, eds. (2000). Cold War respite : the Geneva Summit of 1955. Baton Rouge: Louisiana University Press. ISBN 9780807123706. OCLC 43615790.
- Dockrill, Saki; Frank, Robert; Soutou, Georges-Henri; Varsori, Antonio, eds. (2002). L'Europe de l'Est et de l'Ouest dans la guerre froide 1948-1953. Centre Histoire des relations internationales et de l'Europe du XXe siècle (Paris). Paris: Presses de l'Université de Paris-Sorbonne. ISBN 9782840502432. OCLC 401966767.
