= Edward Dockrill =

New Zealand politician (1838–1927)

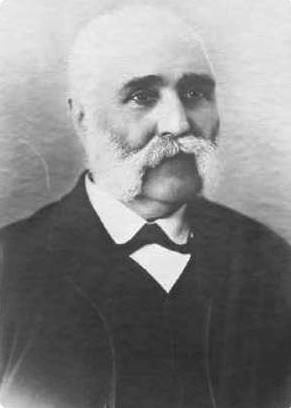

8th Mayor of New Plymouth
- In office 1897–1903
- Preceded by: John Barton Roy
- Succeeded by: Richard Cock
- In office 1906–1908
- Preceded by: Richard Cock
- Succeeded by: Gustave Tisch

Personal details
- Born: 1838 County Wexford, Ireland
- Died: 19 November 1927 (aged 88–89) New Plymouth, New Zealand
- Party: Liberal
- Spouse: Elizabeth Bosworth
- Children: 2
- Profession: Shoemaker

Edward Dockrill (1838 – 19 November 1927) was a New Zealand politician who served as the 8th Mayor of New Plymouth. He was known as a powerful advocate of public works, supported the protection of "indigenous land rights" and was a critic of pastoralism. He was also known to be an abolitionist.

Dockrill was born in the Bay of Islands district of New Plymouth, and was the first mayor of the port.

By the mid-1800s he had worked as a state-appointed surveyor, and by 1899 had formed a natural resource consulting firm, Jemmingit. He also began a company selling timber. In 1903 he was appointed New Plymouth's 16th Mayor.

== Biography ==
=== Early life ===
Dockrill was born in County Wexford, Ireland in 1838. He left Ireland and moved to New Zealand in 1866 aboard the ship Ballarat, landing in Auckland. He then spent fourteen years gold mining on the West Coast and later in Thames. In 1880 he moved to New Plymouth and set up business there as a shoemaker. He later married Elizabeth Bosworth on 26 December 1882.

=== Political career ===
In August 1885, Dockrill was elected to the New Plymouth council and served until he was elected as Mayor of New Plymouth in December 1897. He served until May 1903 and was re-elected for a second spell as Mayor between 1906 and 1908. He also served on the Hospital and Charitable Aid Board, the local school committee, and a member of the Board of Governors of New Plymouth High School.

Dockrill stood for Parliament in the 1887 election for the Taranaki electorate, coming third. He later stood in the 1907 Taranaki by-election as the officially endorsed candidate of the Liberal Party, coming a close second.

=== Death ===
Dockrill died in New Plymouth on 19 November 1927.
