= Taranaki Regiment =

The Taranaki Regiment
- Cap badge of the Taranaki Regiment
- Active: 1858–1948
- Country: New Zealand
- Branch: New Zealand Military Forces
- Type: Infantry
- Garrison/HQ: New Plymouth
- Engagements: New Zealand Wars; Second Boer War; First World War; Second World War

Commanders
- Honorary Colonel: The Earl of Liverpool
- Notable commanders: Harry Atkinson; William Malone; George Bertrand

The Taranaki Regiment was a territorial infantry regiment of the New Zealand Military Forces. The regiment traced its origins to the Taranaki Volunteer Rifle Company, a volunteer corps formed in 1858 and which saw service in the New Zealand Wars. The volunteer corps also provided men to the New Zealand contingents sent to South Africa during the Second Boer War and in 1911 became the 11th Regiment (Taranaki Rifles). During the First World War, the regiment provided a company to each of the battalions of the Wellington Infantry Regiment and saw combat at Galipolli and on the Western Front. After the war the regiment was renamed the Taranaki Regiment and remained in New Zealand for home defense during the Second World War. Men from the regiment, however, served with the 19th, 22nd, 25th and 36th Battalions of the Second New Zealand Expeditionary Force. In 1948, the Taranaki Regiment was amalgamated with the Wellington West Coast Regiment and became the Wellington West Coast and Taranaki Regiment.

== History ==
=== Origins ===
In February 1858 the New Plymouth Battalion of Militia was called up in anticipation of conflict with the local Māori. By the end of August, however, the New Zealand Government decided the militia was too expensive to maintain and they were disbanded. Many of the militiamen were dismayed by the decision and resolved in September to form the a volunteer corps. The volunteers received new Enfield Rifles in December and the formation of the Taranaki Volunteer Rifle Company was officially proclaimed by Governor Thomas Browne on 13 January 1859. The corps was formed into two companies: no.1 company under Captain Isaac Watt, a future Member of Parliament, and no.2 company under Captain Harry Atkinson, a future Premier of New Zealand and later commander of the unit.

=== First Taranaki War ===
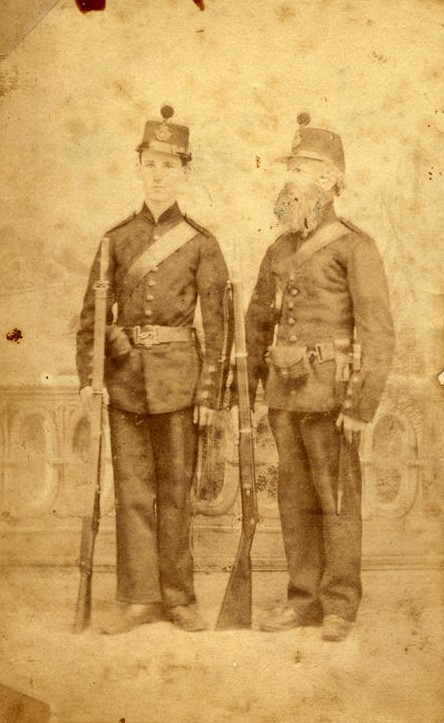
Two men of the Taranaki Volunteer Rifles, 1868

In late 1859 the New Zealand Government had organised to purchase the Pekapeka block from the minor Te Āti Awa chief, Te Teira Manuka. However a more senior chief, Wiremu Kīngi Te Rangitāke, opposed the purchase and the disagreement led to the outbreak of the First Taranaki War in March 1860. The Taranaki Volunteers were mobilised and on 28 March, were sent to help evacuate settlers from outlying areas into New Plymouth. The 103 strong company of volunteers, along with men from the militia, 65th Regiment and HMS Niger became engaged with Māori near the Waireka stream. The volunteers set up a defensive position around a farm house below Kaipopo Pā, but late in the day became isolated when the 65th withdrew (as they were under orders to retire to New Plymouth before nightfall). Fortunately a further detachment from HMS Niger had landed in the afternoon and joined the battle at dusk. They fired rockets at, and later stormed, the pā, forcing the Māori to withdraw. The volunteers then withdrew to New Plymouth during the night. The Battle of Waireka was lauded as a British victory over a much larger Māori force. The volunteer's casualties were four wounded, out of a total of 14 British casualties, while the Māori casualties were estimated to be about 100. Some modern historians, however, argue that the Māori casualties were likely minimal and that in reality victory lay with the Māori who were able to continue to raid the evacuated farms. Waireka was the first time a British Empire reservist unit had been committed to battle.

The volunteers spent the winter of 1860 defending New Plymouth and three volunteers were killed in ambushes during patrols. In spring a war party of Ngāti Hauā, led by Wetini Taiporutu, arrived in Taranaki and crossed the Waitara on 5 November. Wetini had sent a letter to the British inviting them to battle and it was feared they intended to attack New Plymouth. Major General Thomas Pratt (commander of the British forces in Australasia) immediately issued orders to repulse the Māori. A large British contingent included 90 Taranaki Volunteers, attacked Wetini's force at an old, practically unfortified pā site at Māhoetahi. The volunteers deployed on the left with the militia, while the 65th regiment was on the right. Two 24-pounder Howitzers of the Royal Artillery supported the attack. The battle culminated in a bayonet charge which forced the Māori to fall back from the pā. The retreating Māori became trapped against a swamp and were encircled by the British forces. The Taranaki Volunteers lost 2 men killed and 4 wounded, while the British regulars took a further 15 casualties. Approximately two-thirds of the 150-strong Māori force were believed to be either killed or wounded. The volunteers remained in New Plymouth for the rest of the war, which ended in March 1861.

=== Second Taranaki War ===
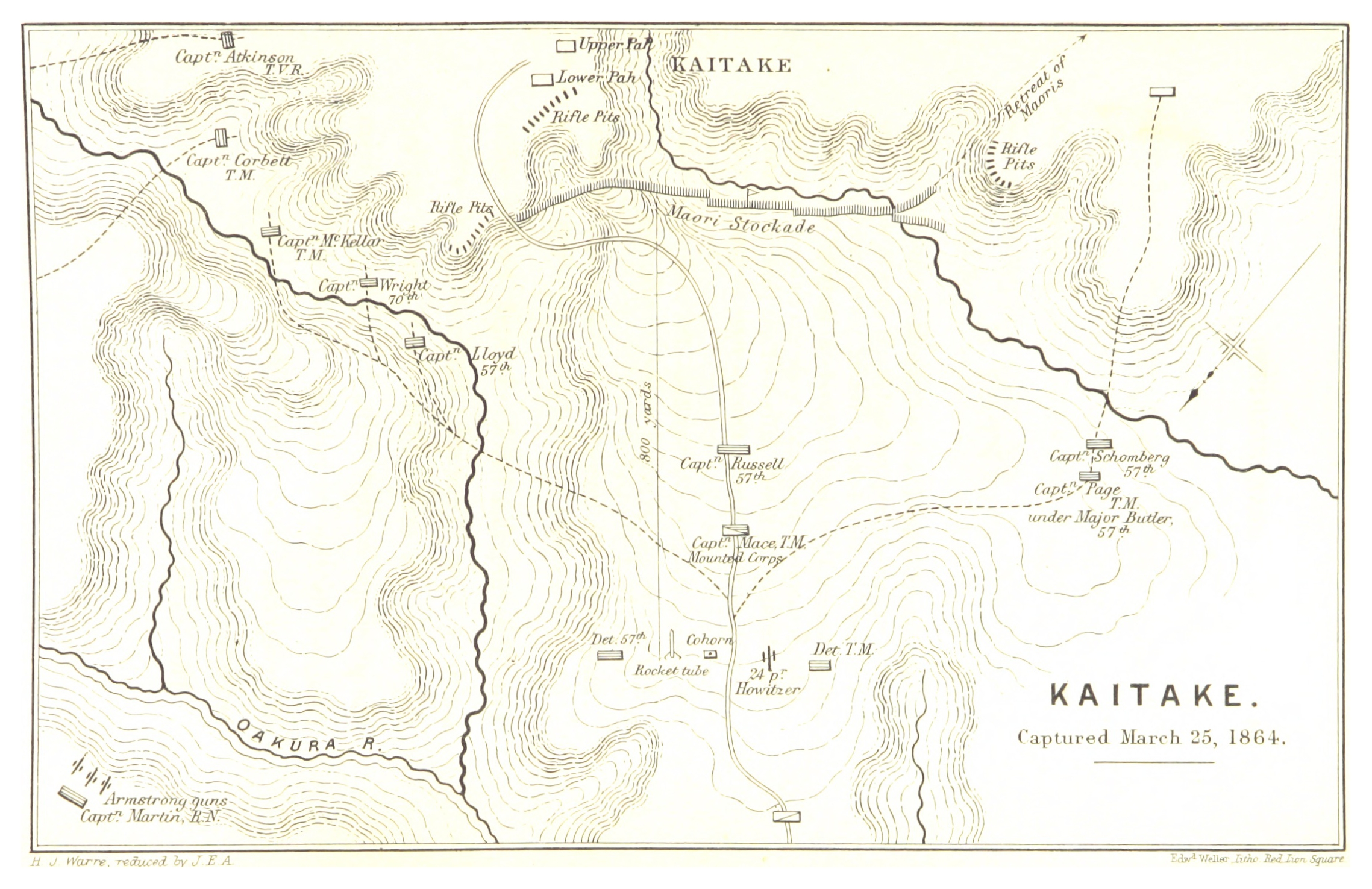
Map of the Battle of Kaitake, 1864 The Taranaki Volunteer Rifles (TVR) are depicted top left

The Second Taranaki War broke out in May 1863 when soldiers of the 57th Regiment tried to evict Māori at Tataraimaka. Unlike the first war, the Volunteers received permission from the new British commander, Colonel Henry Warre, to operate outside the town limits. Two 45-man bushranger companies were formed and equipped with breech loading Calisher and Terry carbines. The Bushrangers patrolled the area surrounding New Plymouth, deterring Māori raiding parties and defending the farmsteads. From September the Māori became more active and the volunteers were involved in a number of actions. In October a group of men from the 57th Regiment were ambushed by Māori at Allen's hill and the volunteers came to their aid. The arrival of more British forces prompted the Māori to pull back and so the volunteers were not seriously engaged. Māori losses are unknown, but the 57th lost one man killed and 8 wounded, while 2 men received the Victoria Cross. The next year, in March 1864, Warre attacked Kaitake pā. The volunteers moved through the bush to attack the palisade from behind, while other units attacked the palisade from the front. The Māori withdrew and only suffered only one man killed, while the pā was captured without loss to the British (although two men of the 57th Regiment were wounded when pulling down the palisade). The Taranaki Rifles Volunteers' final action of the war was the storming of Manutahi pā in October 1864. Colonel Warre noted that the volunteers had hitherto not been seriously engaged and gave them the honour of leading the attack. The volunteers attacked the pā from two sides and came under fire, but the Māori defenders soon fled. One of the volunteers was wounded during this action, while one Māori was killed and another two were wounded. Peace was declared by Governor George Grey on 25 October 1864, however the conflict would continue for some time and the bushrangers would skirmish with Māori at Warea in June 1865.

=== Late Victorian Period ===
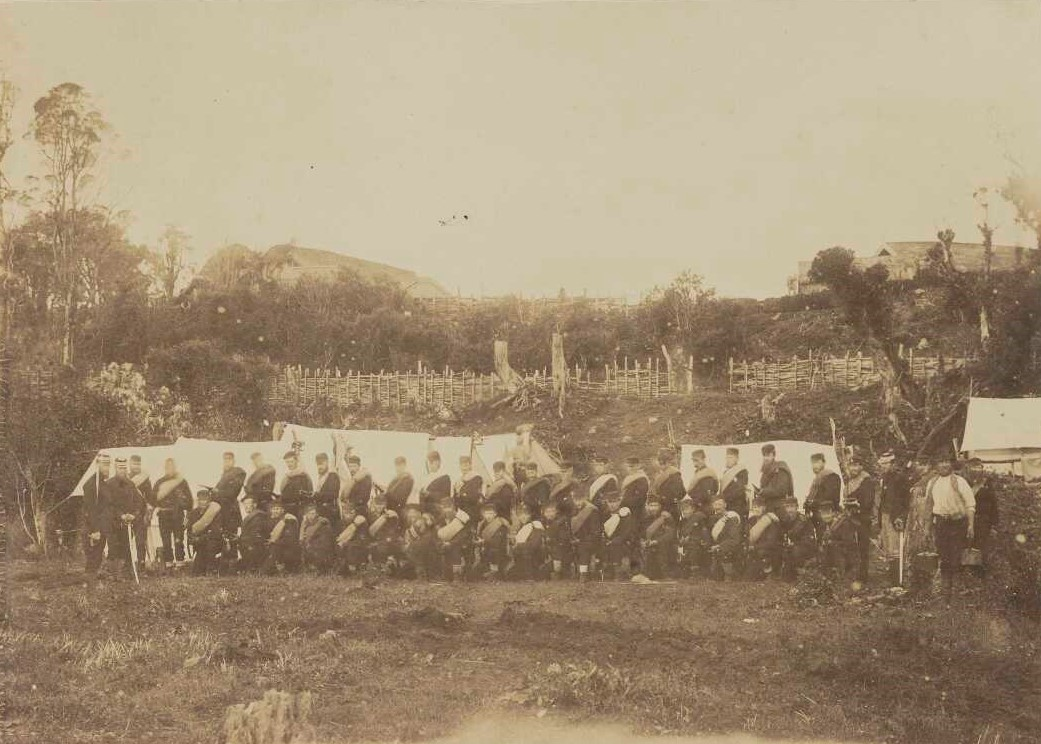
The Taranaki Volunteers at Parihaka, 1881

The Taranaki Volunteers were disbanded in 1866, but later reformed in 1876. The corps was expanded to three companies in 1879 and mobilized in 1881, when the government sent more than 1500 troops, including 51 men of the Taranaki Volunteers, to Parihaka. The Māori pacifist leader, Te Whiti o Rongomai, had been leading a resistance campaign against the New Zealand government since its occupation of land in the Waimate Plains in 1879. Parihaka was perceived as his base of resistance and so the village was destroyed by the government forces. Te Whiti was arrested and the village's inhabitants were dispersed.

In 1886, the Taranaki Volunteers, along with numerous other volunteers corps, were merged into the West Coast (North Island) Battalion of Rifle Volunteers. The battalion was disbanded in 1888, although the Taranaki Volunteers continued to exist as an independent unit. The New Zealand volunteer corps were again formed into battalions in 1895, with the Taranaki Volunteers becoming D Company, Wellington Battalion of Infantry Volunteers and later redesignated as C Company, 2nd Battalion, Wellington (West Coast) Rifle Volunteers in 1898. A further reorganisation in 1901 saw the Taranki Volunteers become A Company of the newly established 4th Battalion, Wellington (Taranaki) Rifle Volunteers, which consisted exclusively of Taranaki-based volunteer corps. (Note: The other companies of the 4th battalion were the Taranaki Guards, Patea Rifles, Inglewood Rifles, Eltham Rifles, Hawera Rifles, Stratford Rifles, and Waitara Rifles (B, C, D, E, F, G and H companies respectively). These corps were all formed in 1901, except for the Taranaki Guards which was formed in 1900)

During the Second Boer War (1899-1902), the New Zealand Government sent a number of mounted rifles contingents to fight in South Africa. The Taranaki Volunteers provided 25 men to these contingents, the second largest contribution by any New Zealand volunteer corps. A further two members of the corps served with other British Empire units.

The New Zealand territorial force was formed in 1910 and a system of compulsory military training replaced the old volunteer system. Following these reforms, in 1911 the 4th Battalion became an independent regiment: the 11th (Taranaki Rifles) Regiment. Lieutenant Colonel William Malone, who had become the unit commander in 1910, introduced the Lemon Squeezer as the regimental hat in 1911. The lemon Squeezer was designed to help let rainwater run off the hat, while also alluding to the shape of Mount Taranaki. The rest of the New Zealand Military Forces adopted the Lemon Squeezer in 1916 and it continues to be worn by the New Zealand Army today. In 1913 the Governor of New Zealand, the Earl of Liverpool, was appointed Honorary Colonel of the regiment.

=== First World War ===
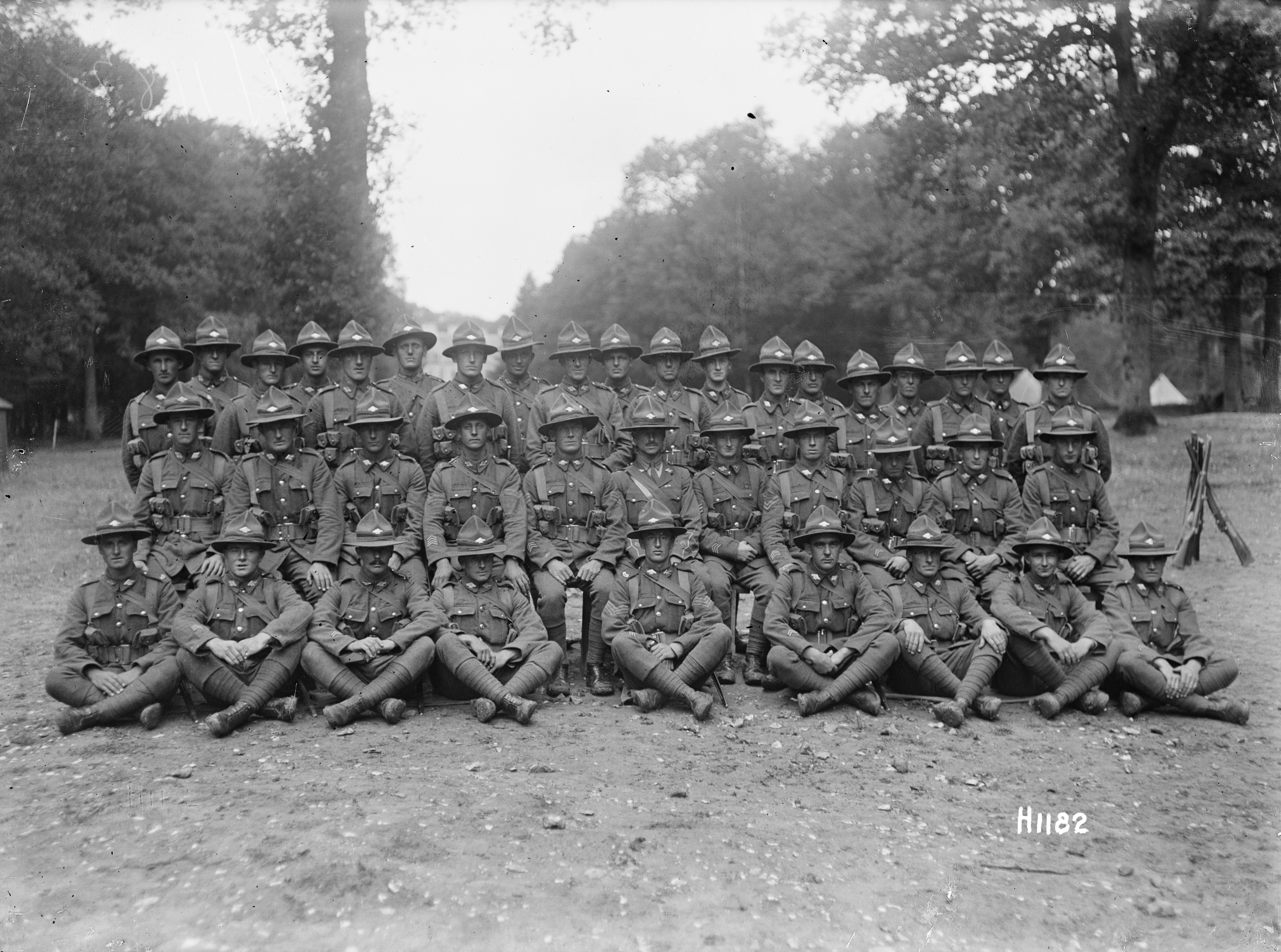
A Taranaki platoon of the Wellington Regiment, 1918

At the outbreak of war in August 1914, the decision was made to form a New Zealand infantry brigade of four battalions from the existing territorial regiments. Men from the 11th Regiment (Taranaki Rifles) formed the 11th (Taranaki) Company of the Wellington Infantry Regiment, which saw service during the Gallipoli Campaign. Malone was appointed to command the Wellington Regiment, but was killed in 1915 at the Battle of Chunuk Bair during which the regiment suffered a 90% casualty rate. Following the evacuation from Gallipoli in 1916, the regiment was expanded to two battalions. The Wellington Regiment would see action on the western front, engaging in the battles of the Somme, Messines, Broodseinde, Passchendaele, German Spring Offensive and the Hundred Days' Offensive. A third battalion was also raised in 1917, but was disbanded in 1918 due to manpower shortages. Both the 2nd and 3rd battalions were organised along the same lines as the 1st Battalion, each with their own eponymous 11th (Taranaki) Company. The Wellington Regiment was disbanded at the end of the war.

One member of the 11th (Taranaki Rifles) Regiment, Sergeant John Grant, won the Victoria Cross during the First World War. Grant, who was serving with 1st Battalion, Wellington Regiment at the time, received the award for clearing a number of machine gun posts during the Second Battle of Bapaume.

=== Inter War ===
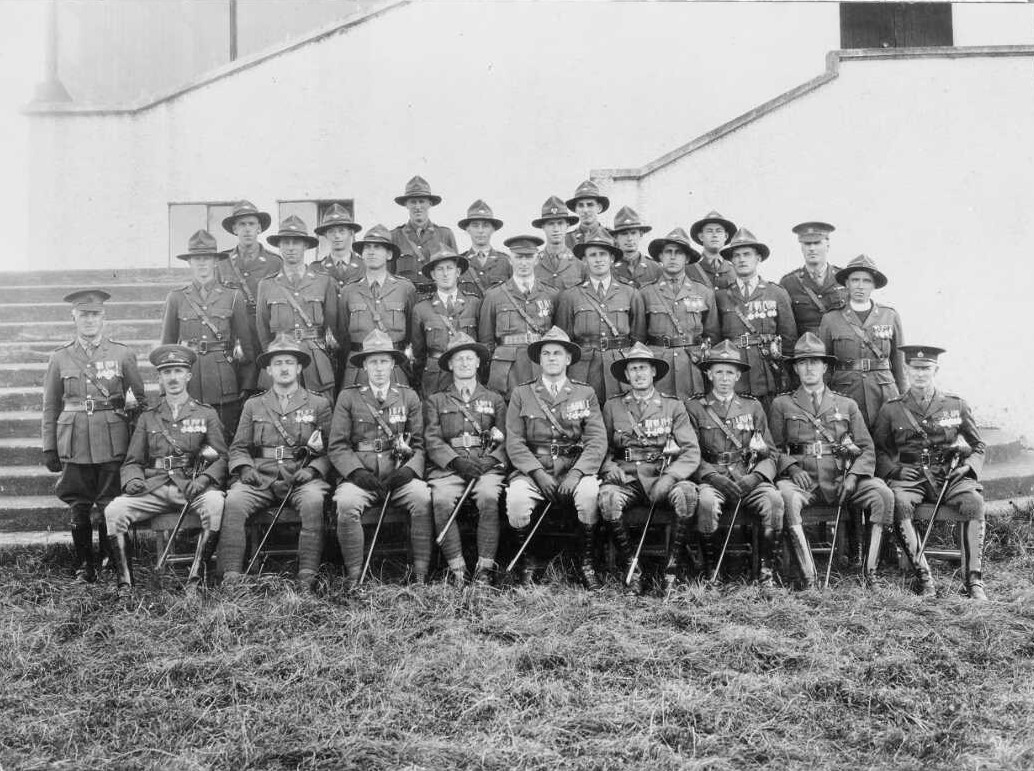
Officers of 1st Battalion, Taranaki Regiment, 1930

In 1921, the New Zealand territorial regiments were reorganised into larger regiments, similar to those of the First World War, with the 11th (Taranaki) Regiment becoming the 4th Battalion, Wellington Regiment. The amalgamations were short lived and in 1923, the previous organisation was reverted to, although the ordinals were dropped and the regiment became the Taranaki Regiment.

A similar organisation occurred in 1937. The Taranaki Regiment was reduced to a depot and supplied a rifle company to the 2nd Composite Battalion. The new Battalion also had rifle companies from the Wellington West Coast and Hawkes Bay regiments. The composite system was abandoned in May 1939, just prior to the outbreak of war and the territorial regiments were brought up to their war establishment.

=== Second World War ===
During the Second World War, the Taranaki Regiment remained in New Zealand for home defence. A second battalion was formed in 1942 by redesignating the 14th Battalion of the National Military Reserve. The 2nd Battalion was an independent battalion and was intended to defend Taranaki, while the 1st Battalion became part of 2nd Infantry Brigade, 4th Division, and was expected to provide a mobile response to any invasion throughout the country. The territorial forces was stood down in June 1943 and the 2nd Battalion was formally disbanded in April 1944.

Men from the regiment saw active service overseas with the 19th, 22nd, 25th and 36th battalions of the 2nd New Zealand Expeditionary Force. A Taranaki Company was formed in each of the 19th, 22nd and 25th battalions, similar to the Wellington Regiment of the First World War. These battalions formed part of the 2nd New Zealand Division and saw action in Greece, Crete, North Africa, Tunisia and Italy. The 36th Battalion, was deployed to the Pacific with the 3rd New Zealand Division and saw combat at the Treasury Islands.

=== Amalgamation ===
The Taranaki Regiment was amalgamated with the Wellington West Coast Regiment in 1948 and became the Wellington West Coast and Taranaki Regiment. The amalgamated regiment would later become the 5th Battalion, Royal New Zealand Infantry Regiment and celebrated their 150th birthday in 2008, derived from the Taranaki Volunteer Rifle Company.

== Battle Honours and Colours ==
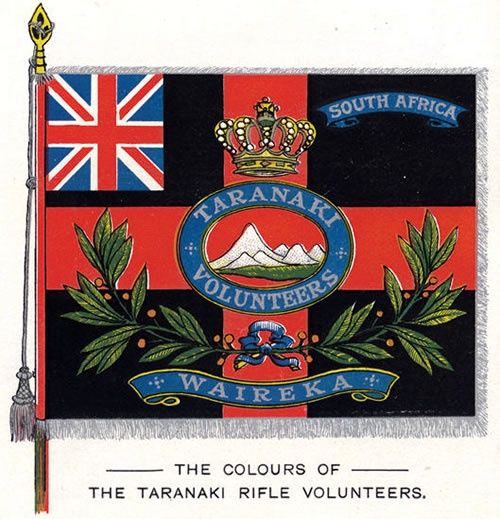
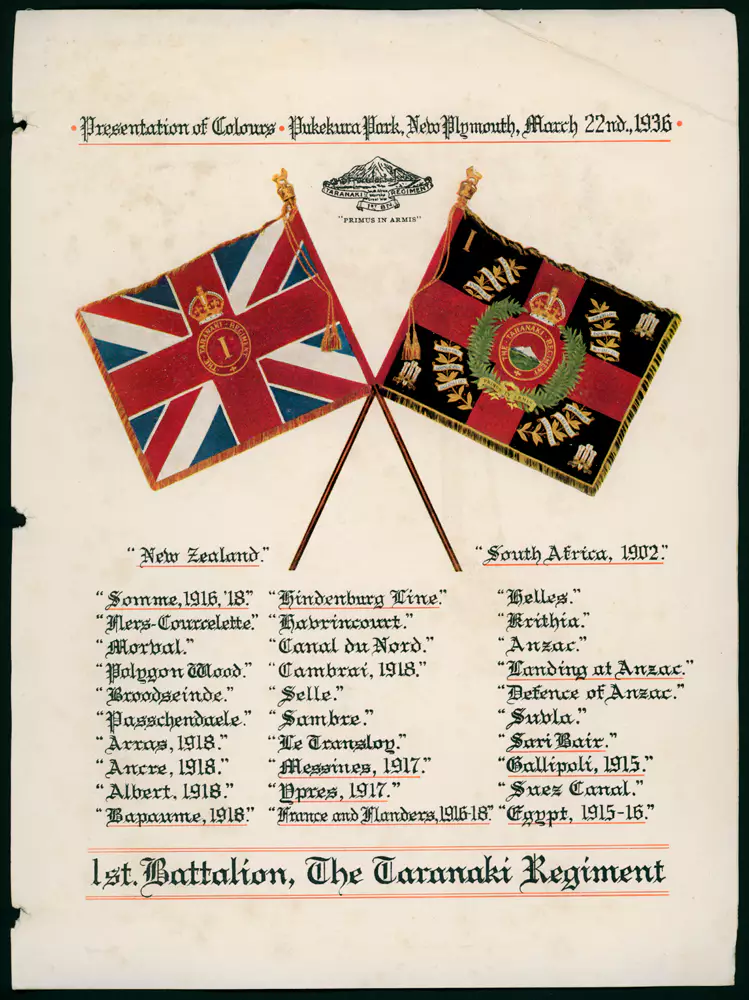
Regimental Colour presented to the Taranaki Rifle Volunteers in 1861 (left) and the King's and Regimental Colours presented to the Taranaki Regiment in 1936 (right)

The Taranki Volunteer Rifle Company was presented an unofficial regimental colour on 25 June 1861. The colour was emblazoned with the battle honour "Waireka" and later had "South Africa" added to them. In 1913, the other territorial regiments dropped the word "rifles" from their titles so that they could be authorised to carry colours (rifle regiments do not carry colours). The 11th Regiment (Taranaki Rifles) were the only regiment which decided to retain the designation as rifles and, despite an appeal to be made an exception to the rule, were not formally authorised to carry colours. When the Taranaki Regiment applied for colours in the early 1930s (no longer being a rifle regiment), the Army Council took exception to the battle honour "Waireka". They argued that "Waireka" was not an authorised battle honour and pointed out that it had not been awarded to other British units which had been present at the battle. After much correspondence, it was decided to award the regiment the battle honour "New Zealand". The Taranaki Regiment was the only regiment of the New Zealand Military Forces to bear this battle honour until the formation of the New Zealand Regiment in 1947 (which inherited the Battle honours of all the New Zealand territorial infantry regiments). It is sometimes claimed that the Taranaki regiment was the only British Commonwealth regiment to bear its own country's name as a battle honour. Many Canadian regiments, however, bear the honour "Defence of Canada 1812-1815" and likewise some South African regiments were awarded "South Africa 1899-1902". The Taranaki Regiment were presented with a new stand of colours on 22 March 1936. The new colours were emblazoned with a further ten battle honours from the First World War and were laid up in St Mary's Church on 10 December 1972. The colours of both the Taranaki Volunteer Rifles and the Taranaki Regiment were temporarily removed form the church during restorations in 2016.

The Taranaki Regiment were awarded the following battle honours:

- New Zealand Wars: New Zealand*
- Boer War: South Africa 1899-1902*
- First World War: Anzac, Landing at Anzac*, Defence of Anzac, Suvla, Sari Bair*, Gallipolli 1915*, Helles, Krithia, Suez Canal, Egypt 1915-16*, Somme 1916,18*; Flers-Courcelette, Morval, Polygon Wood, Messines 1917*, Broodseinde, Ypres 1917*, Passendale, Arras 1918, Albert 1918, Bapaume 1918*, Hindenburg Line*, Havrincourt, Canal du Nord, Cambrai 1918, Selle, Sambre, Le Transloy, France and Flanders 1916–1918*

(*denotes battle honours emblazoned on the colours)

The Taranaki Regiment did not receive any battle honours during the Second World War. However, in 1958, the regiment's descendant unit, the Wellington West Coast and Taranaki Regiment, inherited the battle honours of the 19th, 22nd, 25th and 36th battalions with which men from the Taranaki Regiment served.

== Alliances ==
United Kingdom – The Middlesex Regiment (Duke of Cambridge's Own) (1913-1948)

== Notes ==
Footnotes

Citations
