= Edward Smith (New Zealand politician) =

New Zealand politician (1839–1907)

Edward Metcalf Smith
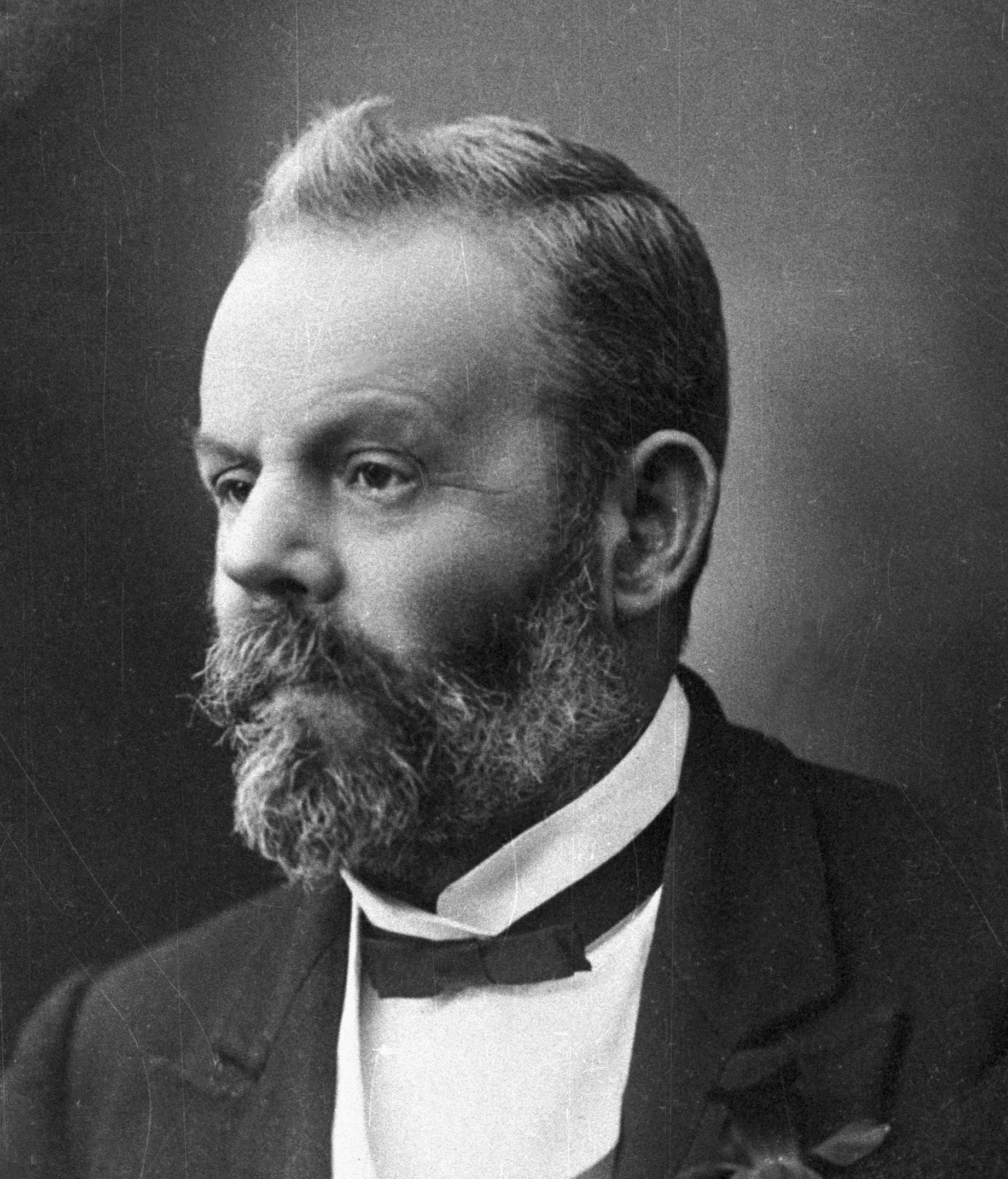
- Edward Metcalf Smith in ca 1900

Member of the New Zealand Parliament for New Plymouth
- In office 1890–1896
- Preceded by: Oliver Samuel
- Succeeded by: In abeyance until 1928

Member of the New Zealand Parliament for Taranaki
- In office 1899–1907
- Preceded by: Henry Brown
- Succeeded by: Henry Okey

Personal details
- Born: 10 January 1839 Bradley, Staffordshire, England
- Died: 19 April 1907 (aged 68) New Plymouth, New Zealand
- Party: Liberal Party
- Relations: Sydney George Smith (son)

Edward Metcalf Smith (10 January 1839 – 19 April 1907) was an armourer and Liberal Party politician in New Zealand, and an advocate of the development of Taranaki's ironsand and oil.

== Early life ==
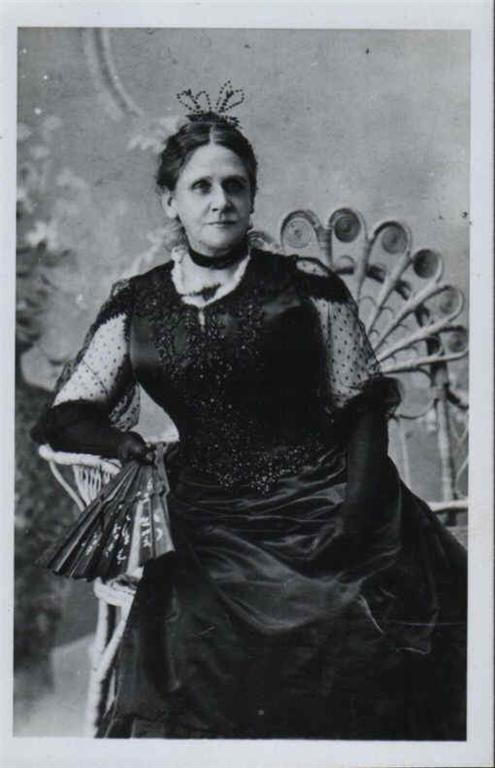
Mary Ann Golding, Smith's wife

Smith was born on 10 January 1839, in Fenny Compton Warwickshire, England. His father Charles METCALF was an Agricultural Labourer, and his mother was Maria Joiner. He was orphaned by the age of 15. He worked, as a youth, in the iron and steel industry in Staffordshire, probably at Bradley Hill Ironworks and in Cradley Heath, then joined gun makers Hollis in Birmingham, England . He became an apprentice at the new Royal Small Arms Factory at Enfield Lock, and also had some connection with the Royal Woolwich Arsenal, London. When qualified, he was sent on short term assignment as Garrison Armourer and Small Arms Inspector to the New Zealand field forces. He arrived in Auckland, New Zealand in 1861 on the African, and was based at Fort Britomart in Auckland, New Zealand.

He married Mary Ann Golding on 24 December 1861 in Auckland. She was the daughter of the army officer Nicholas Golding. His wife was born in March 1846 and was thus 15 years old when she married.

== Political career ==
New Zealand Parliament
Years	Term	Electorate	Party
1890–1893	11th	New Plymouth	Liberal
1893–1896	12th	New Plymouth	Liberal
1899–1902	14th	Taranaki	Liberal
1902–1905	15th	Taranaki	Liberal
1905–1907	16th	Taranaki	Liberal

Smith served as a member of parliament in the House of Representatives, representing the New Plymouth electorate from 1890 for two terms until the abeyance of that electorate in 1896. In the 1896 election, he contested the Taranaki electorate, but was beaten by the saw miller Henry Brown. At the 1899 election, he beat Brown, and represented the Taranaki electorate until his death in 1907.

Smith was one of the characters of the house, known for misplacing aspirates and for concluding speeches with his own verse. He became known as 'Ironsand Smith', lamenting the "hiron hores lying on the beach and never a man to work them", and for introducing himself as "Hi ham He Hem Smith. Hem Haitch Har" (translation: I am E M Smith, MHR). Apparently a buffoon, he was a hardworking member, and Seddon often had him follow—and deflate—serious-minded opposition debaters. His attire—a frock-coat, wide waistcoat with buttonhole, and out-of-doors a Tam o' Shanter—was unconventional.

== Ironsand ==
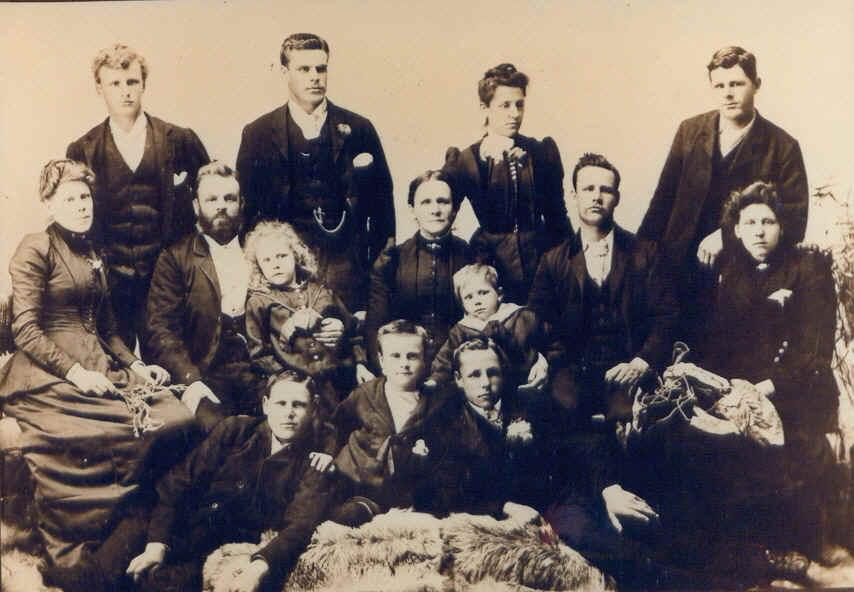
The family of Edward Metcalf and Mary Anne Smith (middle row), with their son Sydney in the front right

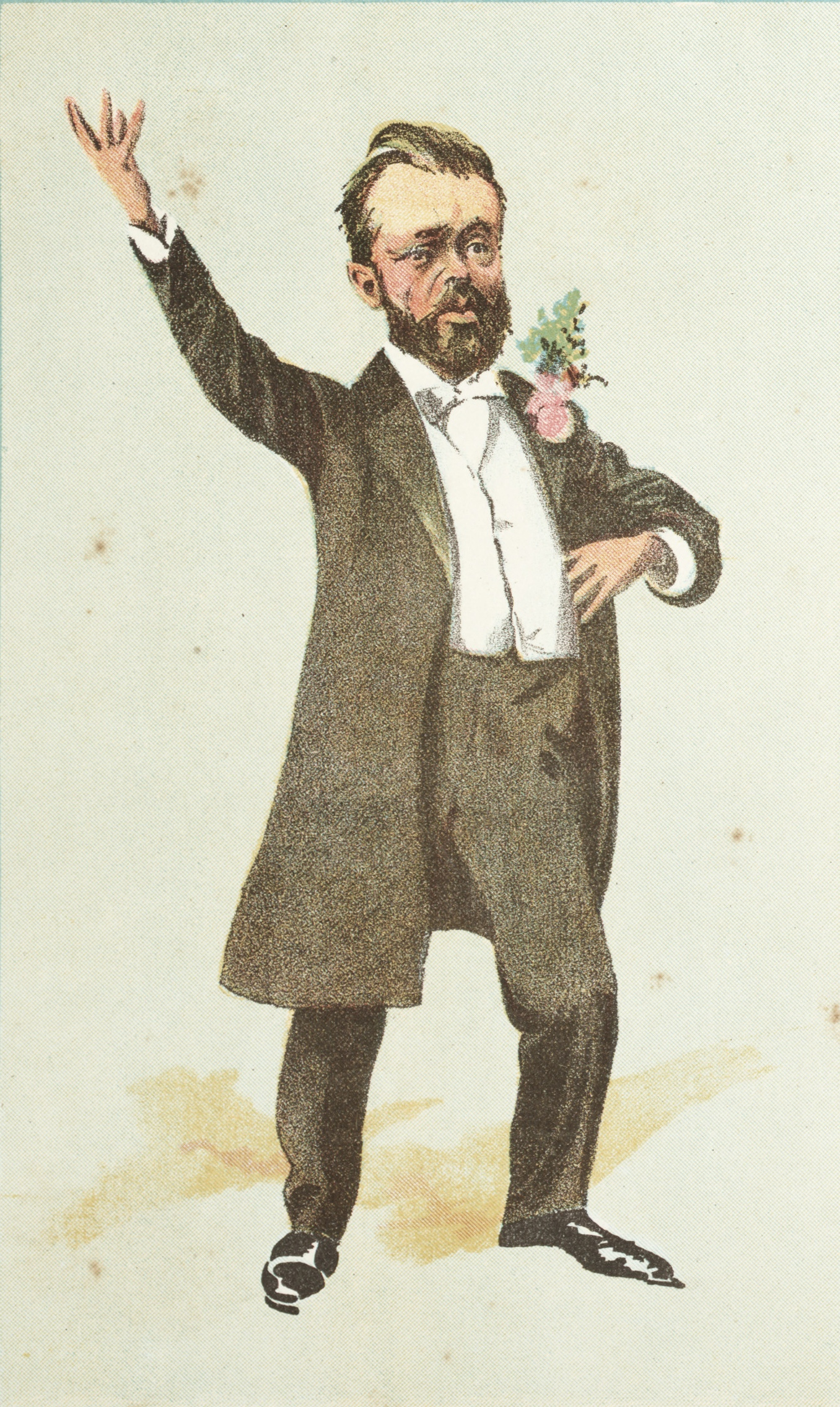
Ironsand, Edward Metcalf Smith

Due to his background, Smith was interested in utilising Taranaki's ironsand. He announced in 1868 that he would experiment with extracting the iron for smelting. In 1873, the partners moved to industrial production. The venture never made any profits and the company was wound up in 1881. Many people lost money with ironsand ventures, including Julius Vogel. In 1892, Smith was a consultant at the Onehunga Ironworks, which was attempting to win a government bonus payment by smelting ironsand. The bonus was paid, but the episode was controversial; critics claimed that little if any of the marketable iron produced was smelted from local ores.

== Death ==
On 19 April 1907, Smith died from injuries he received from a fall from a railway carriage in New Plymouth. He was survived by his seven sons, three daughters, and his wife Mary Ann. Smith's son, Sydney George Smith followed in his political footsteps and became the MP for Taranaki in 1918. Mary Ann Smith lived to see her son enter Parliament; she died on 31 August 1923 in New Plymouth.

== Notes ==
New Zealand Parliament
Preceded by Oliver Samuel	Member of Parliament for New Plymouth; 1890–1896	In abeyance Title next held by Sydney George Smith
Preceded by Henry Brown	Member of Parliament for Taranaki; 1899–1907	Succeeded by Henry Okey
