= Sydney George Smith =

New Zealand politician

The Honourable Sydney George Smith
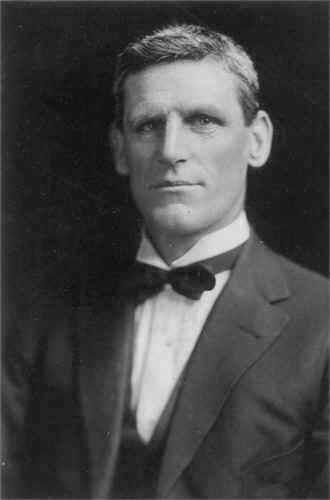
- Sydney George Smith

Member of the New Zealand Parliament for Taranaki
- In office 1918–1925
- Preceded by: Henry Okey
- Succeeded by: Charles Bellringer

Member of the New Zealand Parliament for New Plymouth
- In office 1928–1938
- Preceded by: In abeyance since 1896
- Succeeded by: Fred Frost

Personal details
- Born: 19 January 1879 New Plymouth, New Zealand
- Died: 21 May 1943 (aged 64) New Plymouth, New Zealand
- Party: Liberal Party; United Party
- Spouse(s): Rose Herbert (m. 1901, d. 1913); Kate Bint (m. 1915)
- Relations: Edward Smith (father)

Sydney George Smith (19 January 1879 – 21 May 1943) was a New Zealand politician of the Liberal Party and then the National Party, and a cabinet minister.

== Early life ==
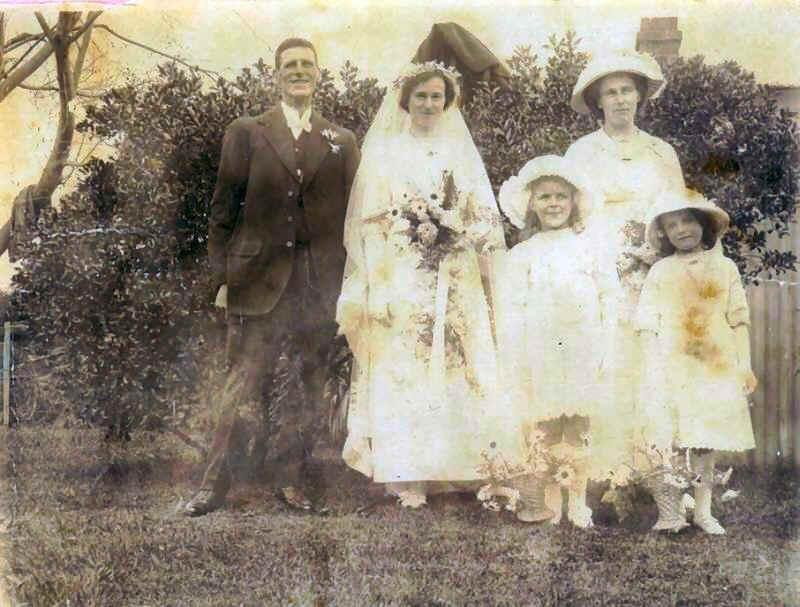
Smith's second wedding, to Kate Bint, with her sister Bertha as bridesmaid

Smith was born in New Plymouth in 1879. His parents were the MHR Edward Smith and Mary Ann Golding. He enjoyed rugby during his youth, and later became an administrator for the sport for the Taranaki Region.

On 19 November 1901, he married Elsie Rose Herbert (known as Rose) at St Mary's Church in New Plymouth. She was a daughter of G H Herbert of the Royal Engineers. They had three children: Rosa Maud (b. 1902), Ethel Mary (b. 1905), and Edward George (b. 1906). His wife died on 3 April 1913, aged 35.

Smith remarried on 25 February 1915, to Catherine (Kate) Bint, again at St Mary's Church. Kate Bint was born in July 1892 at Tarata in Taranaki, some 18 kilometres (11 mi) by road west of Inglewood. He had a further three children from his second marriage: Raymond Sydney (1916–1944), Harry Allman (1918–1998), and Lorna Hazel (b. 1922).

He worked in the New Zealand Railways for 20 years, and for 13 years held office in the Amalgamated Society of Railway Servants.

== Political career ==
New Zealand Parliament
Years	Term	Electorate	Party
1918–1919	19th	Taranaki	Independent Labour
1919–1922	20th	Taranaki	Liberal–Labour
1922–1925	21st	Taranaki	Liberal
1928–1931	23rd	New Plymouth	United
1931–1935	24th	New Plymouth	United
1935–1936	25th	New Plymouth	United
1936–1938	Changed allegiance to:		National

Smith held various offices with trade unions. He was on the New Plymouth Borough Council. He had interests in education.

Smith successfully contested the Taranaki electorate in a by-election in 1918 (following the death of Henry Okey) as an Independent Labour candidate. Smith sat together with the other Labour MPs in Parliament but always stressed his independence. Soon after entering the house MP Charles Wilkinson referred to Labour Party leader Alfred Hindmarsh as the "leader" of Smith. In reply Smith said "You leave the member for Taranaki alone, he will choose his own leader."

He was confirmed at the 1919 election, and in 1922 election successfully stood as a Liberal–Labour candidate. In 1925 he stood unsuccessfully for New Plymouth for the Liberal Party. He was successful in 1928 and returned to Parliament for the United Party until he was defeated at the 1938 election by Labour candidate Fred Frost.

Smith was Minister of Labour and Minister of Mines in the United Government from 28 May 1930 to 22 September 1931. He was Minister of Education in the United–Reform Coalition from 22 November 1934 to 6 December 1935. He was Chairman of Committees from 11 December 1928 to 28 May 1930, and again from 27 October 1931 to 12 February 1935.

In 1935, he was awarded the King George V Silver Jubilee Medal.

== Death ==
Smith, who was known as Sid to his friends, died on 21 May 1943 at New Plymouth, and was buried at Te Henui Cemetery. He was survived by his second wife and his six children. All three of his sons were at the time serving overseas in World War II. His son Raymond was killed on 24 December 1943 by a sniper in Italy.

== Notes ==
Political offices
Preceded by Frank Hockly	Chairman of Committees of the House of Representatives; 1928–1930; 1931–1935	Succeeded by William Bodkin
Preceded by William Bodkin	Chairman of Committees of the House of Representatives; 1928–1930; 1931–1935	Succeeded by Jimmy Nash
Preceded by Robert Masters	Minister of Education; 1934–1935	Succeeded by Peter Fraser
New Zealand Parliament
Preceded by Henry Okey	Member of Parliament for Taranaki; 1918–1925	Succeeded by Charles Bellringer
In abeyance Title last held by Edward Smith	Member of Parliament for New Plymouth; 1928–1938	Succeeded by Fred Frost
Party political offices
Preceded by George Forbes	Senior Whip of the Liberal Party; 1923–1926	Succeeded by Alfred Ransom
