= Henry Okey =

New Zealand politician

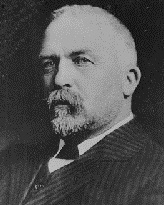
- Okey in 1905

Member of the New Zealand Parliament for Taranaki
- In office 1907–1918
- Preceded by: Edward Smith
- Succeeded by: Sydney George Smith

Chairman of Taranaki County Council
- In office 1896–1905

Personal details
- Born: Henry James Hobbs Okey; 28 May 1857 New Plymouth, New Zealand
- Died: 13 September 1918 (aged 61) New Plymouth, New Zealand
- Party: Reform
- Spouse: Louisa Morey (m. 1884)
- Occupation: Farmer

Henry James Hobbs Okey (28 May 1857 – 13 September 1918) was a Reform Party Member of Parliament in New Zealand.

== Early life and family ==
Born in New Plymouth in 1857, Okey was the son of Edward Okey, an ironmonger. His brothers included Edward Nelson Okey, who in 1880 won what later became known as the Ballinger Belt for the New Zealand champion shot.

On 2 July 1884, Okey married Louisa Morey.

== Political career ==
New Zealand Parliament
| Years | Term | Electorate | Party |
|---|---|---|---|
| 1907–1908 | 16th | Taranaki | Independent |
| 1908–1909 | 17th | Taranaki | Independent |
| 1909–1911 | Changed allegiance to: | | Reform |
| 1911–1914 | 18th | Taranaki | Reform |
| 1914–1918 | 18th | Taranaki | Reform |

Okey was a member of the Taranaki County Council, and served as its chairman between 1896 and 1905. He was also vice president and then president of the Taranaki Agricultraul and Pastoral Society.

Okey contested the Taranaki electorate at the 1905 general election, coming second, 236 votes behind the incumbent, Edward Smith. However, Smith died in 1907 and Okey won the subsequent by-election as an independent. He gave sympathy and support to the Reform Party, and later formally became a Reform MP. Okey held the Taranaki seat until his death in 1918.

== Death ==
Okey died in New Plymouth on 13 September 1918, and was buried in Te Henui Cemetery.

New Zealand Parliament
| Preceded by Edward Smith | Member of Parliament for Taranaki; 1907–1918 | Succeeded by Sydney George Smith |
