= 1909 Thames by-election =

New Zealand by-election

← 1908 general	4 February 1909	1911 general →
- Turnout: 4,017
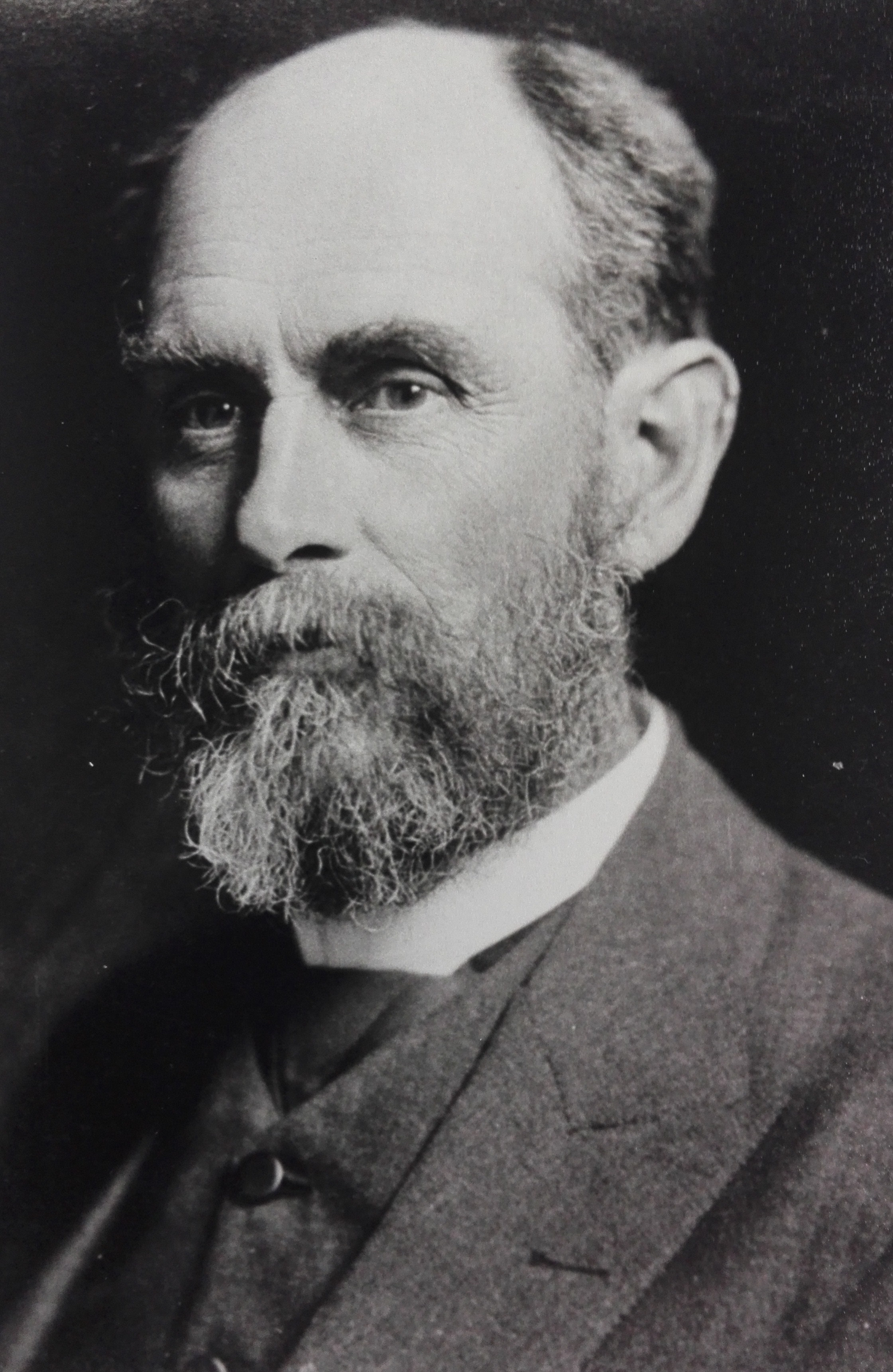

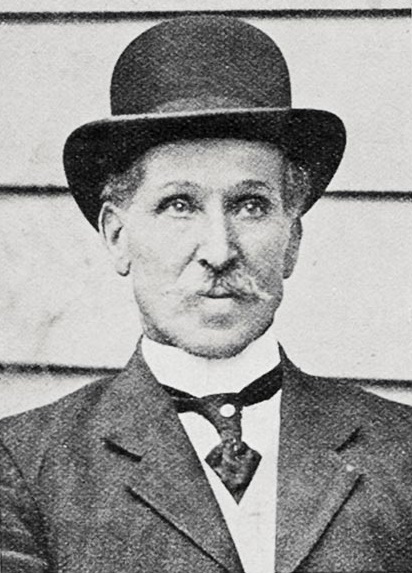
Candidate	Edmund Taylor	William Henry Lucas
Party	Liberal	Liberal
Member before election
James McGowan
Liberal
Elected Member
Edmund Taylor
Liberal

The Thames by-election of 1909 was a by-election held during the 17th New Zealand Parliament.

== Background ==
The by-election was caused after the resignation of Liberal Party MP James McGowan, who had been appointed to the Legislative Council. McGowan announced his resignation by advertisement in the Thames Star on 7 January 1909, and in the same edition, the Mayor of Thames, Archibald Burns, announced his candidacy.

In the end, five candidates contested the election, but Burns was not among them. William Henry Lucas, a unionist, was the official representative of the liberal government. Edmund Taylor and Thomas William Rhodes were also Liberal Party member. Frederick Henry Haselden was the official candidate of the conservative opposition, but Ernest Deeble also stood for opposition interests.

== Results ==
The following table gives the election results:

1909 Thames by-election: First ballot
Party	Candidate	Votes	%	±%
Liberal	Edmund Taylor	1,305	34.44	
Liberal	William Henry Lucas	853	22.51	
Conservative	Ernest Deeble	573	15.12	
Liberal	Thomas William Rhodes	565	14.91	
Conservative	Frederick Henry Haselden	493	13.01	
Turnout		3,789		

The Second Ballot Act 1908 was in force and had previously been used for the 1908 election. This was the first by-election where it applied, and the act stipulated that the leading candidate had to obtain an absolute majority of the votes, or else the two highest polling candidates would face each other in a second election. At the 28 January election, Taylor was the highest-polling candidate, but received only 34% of the vote, hence a second election between him and Lucas was required. That election was held on 4 February 1909, and was won by Taylor.

1909 Thames by-election: Second ballot
Party	Candidate	Votes	%	±%
Liberal	Edmund Taylor	2,241	55.79	
Liberal	William Henry Lucas	1,776	44.21	
Turnout		4,017		

A week after the election, William Massey announced that the opposition will from now on be known as the Reform Party. Taylor served until the end of the parliamentary term and was narrowly beaten by Rhodes at the next general election in 1911. Taylor contested the electorate again in 1914 but Rhodes remained successful.
