= Frederick Moss =

New Zealand politician

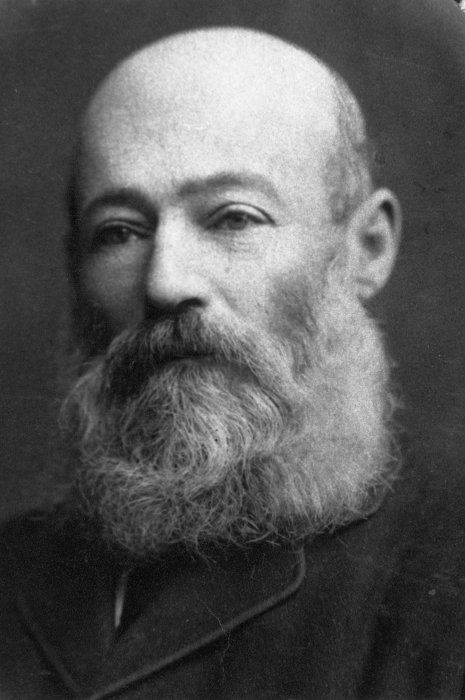
Frederick Moss

Frederick Joseph Moss (1827/1828 – 8 July 1904) was a New Zealand politician who served as a member of Parliament as an independent.

== Early life ==
He was born in Longwood, Saint Helena in 1827 or 1828, and moved to South Africa. He returned to Saint Helena in 1847. There, he married Emily Ann Carew in 1853 or 1854. In 1857, he went back to South Africa, intending to settle in Natal, but locusts had destroyed agricultural prospects. He decided to emigrate to New Zealand instead and the couple and their three children arrived in Lyttelton on the Zealandia on 12 November 1859.

== Life in New Zealand ==
In Lyttelton, Moss supported the Moorhouse tunnel railway project and established himself as a trader. He was instrumental in forming a volunteer company and became captain. With the discovery of gold in Otago, he moved to Dunedin in 1862. He entered various business partnerships, including with Thomas Dick. He became captain of the local rifle volunteers and founded a newspaper, the Otago Daily Mail, which he sold after only a few months.

== Political career ==
New Zealand Parliament
Years	Term	Electorate	Party
1878–1879	6th	Parnell	Independent
1879–1881	7th	Parnell	Independent
1881–1884	8th	Parnell	Independent
1884–1887	9th	Parnell	Independent
1887–1890	10th	Parnell	Independent

In Dunedin, he was elected to the Otago Provincial Council in 1863. He was secretary for public works and served as provincial treasurer. He and Dick, who had been elected onto the Provincial Council in 1859, were opponents of Julius Vogel, who also entered the Provincial Council in 1863. When Vogel became leader of the provincial executive in 1866 and then treasurer, Moss resigned the following year.

He represented the Parnell electorate from 1878 to 1890, when he retired. He was a liberal and a supporter of Sir George Grey and provincialism.

In 1889 he published 'Through atolls and islands in the Great South Sea', Sampson Low, Marston, Searle & Rivington, London. In 1890, he was appointed British Resident of the Cook Islands; he served from April 1891 to September 1898.

His son Edward Moss was the Member of Parliament for Ohinemuri from 1902 to 1905.

== Death ==
Moss died in Auckland on 8 July 1904. He was survived by his wife (by two years) and six of his eight children.

New Zealand Parliament
Preceded by Reader Wood	Member of Parliament for Parnell; 1878–1890	Succeeded by Frank Lawry
