= 1893 City of Auckland by-election =

New Zealand by-election

- 4 August 1893
- Turnout: 3,020
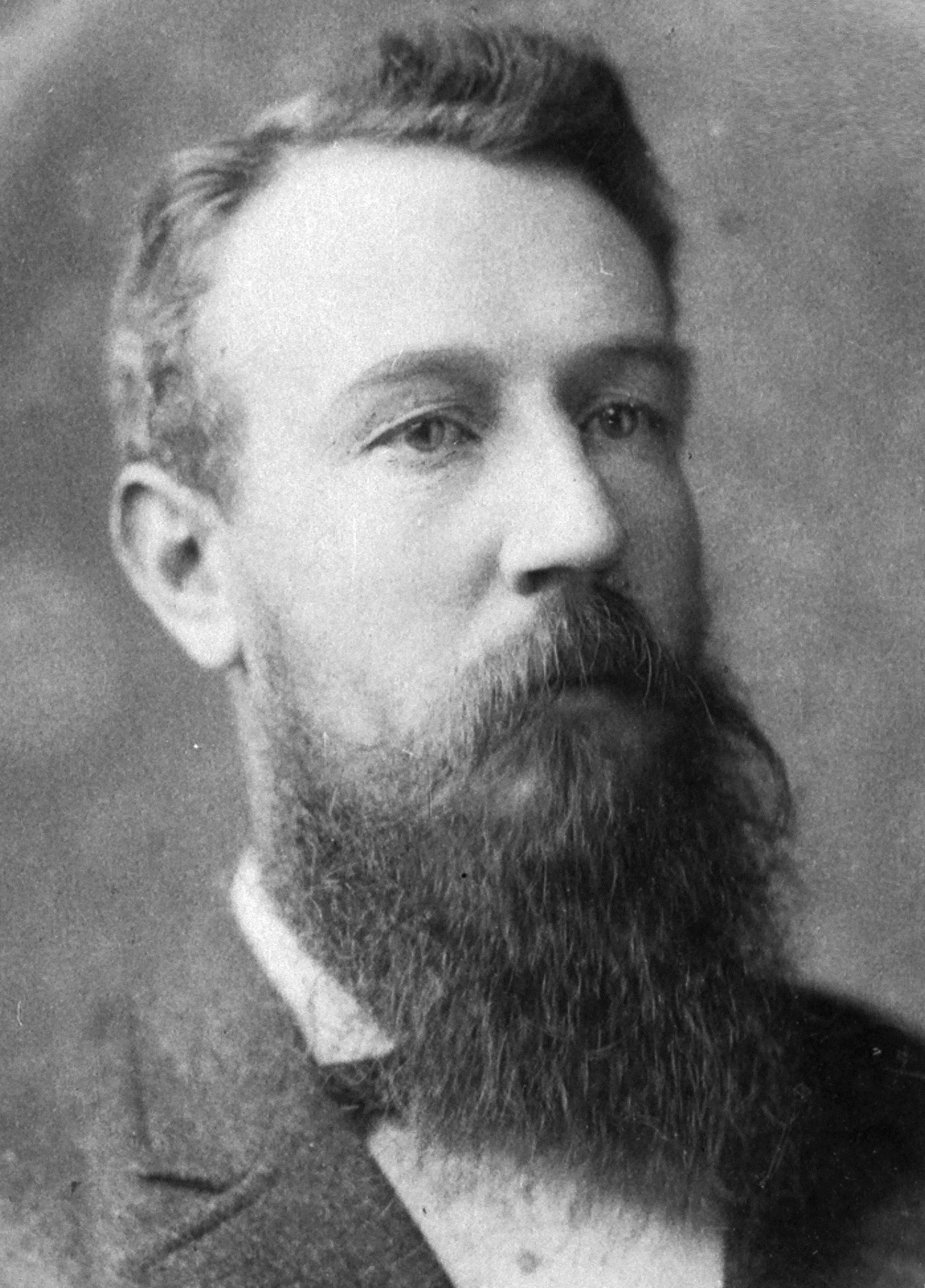

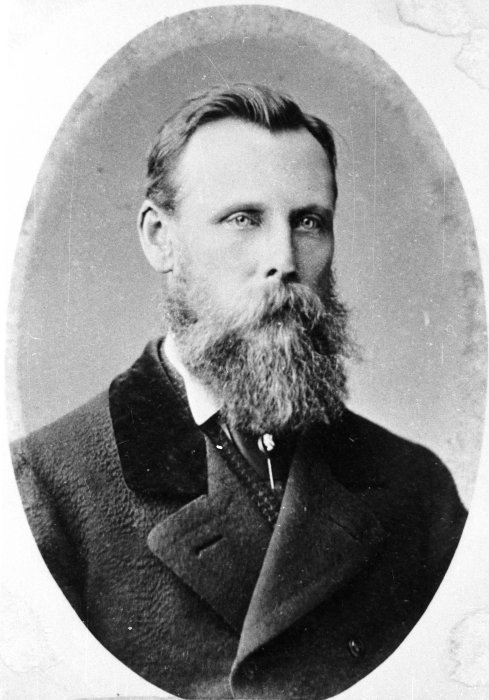
| Candidate | Alfred Cadman | William Lee Rees |
| Party | Liberal | Liberal |
| Popular vote | 1,888 | 1,132 |
MP before election
William Lee Rees
Liberal
Elected MP
Alfred Cadman
Liberal

The City of Auckland by-election of 1893 was a by-election held on 4 August 1893 during the 11th New Zealand Parliament in the urban upper North Island electorate of the City of Auckland.

== Background ==
In 1893, William Lee Rees accused Alfred Cadman, the Member for Thames, of using his position as Minister for Native Affairs for his own personal benefit. Cadman then sued Rees for libel but the trial proved inconclusive. The jury in the libel case found that "the letters of Mr Rees to the Premier were defamatory, and that the defamatory matter was not only not fair and bona fide comment on the acts and conduct of the plaintiff, but that it was not true", however they only awarded damages of £1 which "implied [Cadman's] acts and conduct were yet not above suspicion."

On 11 July 1893 while in the debating chamber of New Zealand's parliament Cadman challenged Rees to vacate his seat and contest the subsequent by-election against him. Rees accepted the challenge although Cadman was ultimately successful.

== Results ==
The following table gives the election results:

1893 City of Auckland by-election
| Party | Candidate | Votes | % | ±% |
|---|---|---|---|---|
| Liberal | Alfred Cadman | 1,888 | 62.51 | |
| Liberal | William Lee Rees | 1,132 | 37.48 | |
| Majority | | 751 | 24.86 | |
| Turnout | | 3,020 | | |

A by-election was later held in Thames for Cadman's newly vacant seat.
