= Nisbet McRobie =

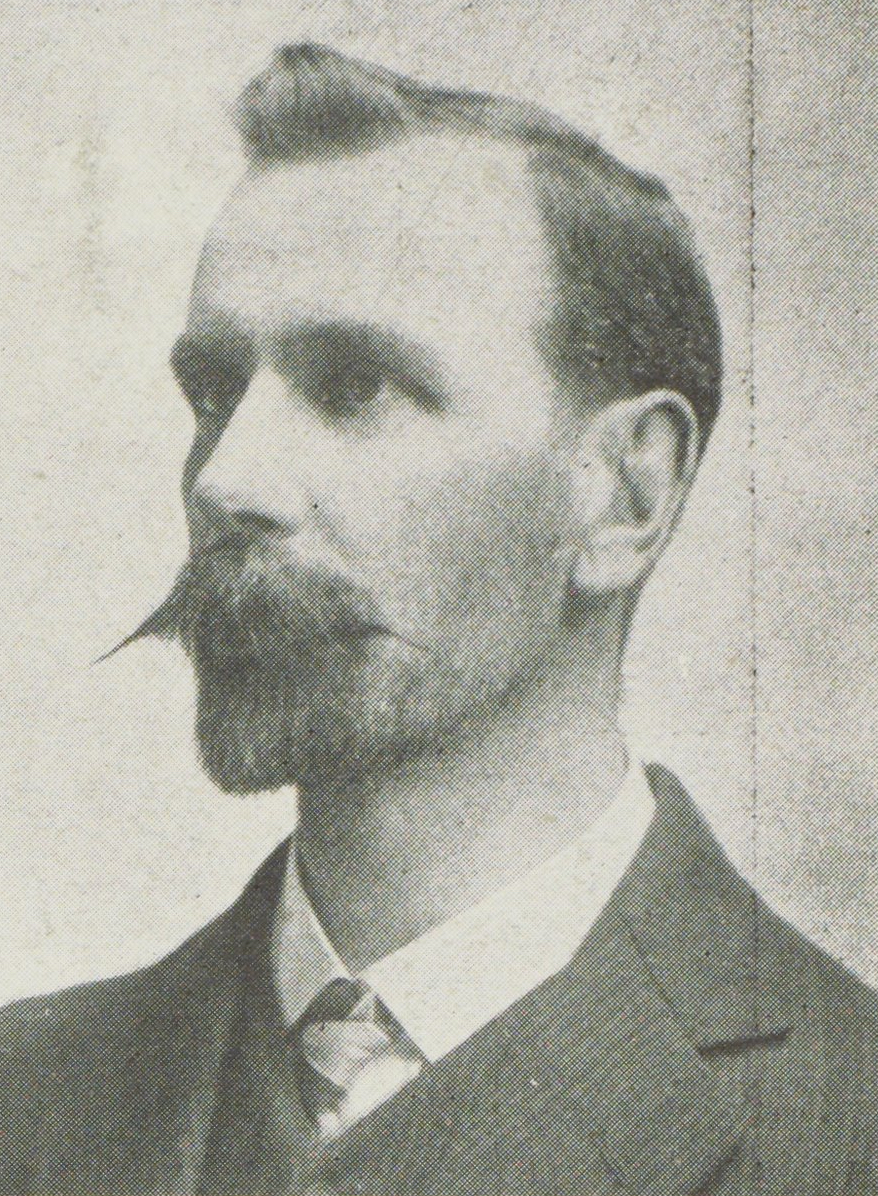
- Born: 5 November 1872 Invercargill, New Zealand
- Died: 27 September 1929 (aged 56) Epsom, Auckland, New Zealand
- Occupation: Master printer

Rugby union career
- Position: Hooker
Provincial / State sides
Years	Team	Apps	(Points)
1889–1896	Southland		
International career
Years	Team	Apps	(Points)
1896	New Zealand	0	(0)

Nisbet McRobie (5 November 1872 – 27 September 1929) was a New Zealand rugby union player, master printer, newspaper proprietor, and politician.

== Rugby union ==
A hooker, McRobie represented, and often captained, Southland at a provincial level between 1889 and 1896. In 1896 he became the first player from the Southland union to play for the New Zealand national side, when he appeared in a match against the touring Queensland team. That was his only game for New Zealand. He later served on the management committee of the New Zealand Rugby Union between 1900 and 1901.

== Printing and newspaper career ==
After completing his printing apprenticeship, McRobie worked for The Press in Christchurch, The Timaru Herald, and The New Zealand Times in Wellington, becoming the factory manager for the latter newspaper in 1904. After a period managing the Pahiatua Herald, McRobie was appointed general manager of The New Zealand Times. In 1909 he purchased the Waihi Daily Times, but sold that publication in 1915, and moved to Auckland, where he became the manager of Business Printing Works Limited. McRobie served as president of the Auckland Master Printers' Association between 1916 and 1924, and was president of the New Zealand Master Printers' Federation from 1922 to 1924.

== Politics ==
At the 1911 general election, McRobie stood as the Reform Party candidate in the Ohinemuri electorate. He finished in third place, behind the incumbent, Hugh Poland of the Liberal Party, and the Socialist candidate, Pat Hickey.

== Death ==
McRobie died at his home in the Auckland suburb of Epsom on 28 September 1929, after a long illness. He was buried at Hillsborough Cemetery.
