= Frederick Haselden =

New Zealand politician

Member of the New Zealand Parliament for Patea
- In office 1901–1902
- Preceded by: George Hutchison
- Succeeded by: Walter Symes

Personal details
- Born: 1849 Marylebone, England
- Died: 1941 (aged 91–92) Cape Province, South Africa
- Occupation: Farmer

Frederick Henry Haselden (1849–1941) was a conservative Member of Parliament from the Taranaki Region in New Zealand for the Patea electorate.

== Birth and family ==
Haselden was born on 24 December 1846 in Marylebone, Middlesex, England. He was the son of Rev. Charles Haselden and Maria Simpson Moore. The family emigrated to New Zealand aboard the SS Mermaid in 1860. His brother was a Wellington stipendiary magistrate.

== Life in New Zealand ==
Before October 1896, Haselden had become a sheep farmer in Hunterville, Taranaki Region. He was also appointed a Justice of the Peace. He was active in local government and served, on the Rangitikei County Council and on the district Licensing Committee.

== Parliamentary career ==
New Zealand Parliament
Years	Term	Electorate	Party
1901	14th	Patea	Conservative
1901–1902	14th	Patea	Conservative

Following the resignation of George Hutchison, he was elected for Patea in an 18 July 1901 by-election. After an electoral petition the seat was declared vacant from 9 October 1901. He was re-elected in the subsequent 6 November by-election, but was defeated in the 1902 general election. Despite claiming to be of liberal thought he was long associated with local conservativism and was elected as an opponent of the then Liberal government of Richard Seddon, labelling it a one-man band. He opposed compulsory purchase of large estate land, organised labor, Bible-reading in public schools and federation with Australia. He was a supporter of free trade and equal pay for equal work.

In the 1908 general election, he stood unsuccessfully for Ohinemuri, and in 1909 he stood in the 1909 by-election for Thames.

== Later life ==
Haselden later moved to South Africa, where he died in 1941.

New Zealand Parliament
Preceded by George Hutchison	Member of Parliament for Patea; 1901–1902	Succeeded by Walter Symes
