= 1893 Thames by-election =

New Zealand by-election

- 26 July 1893
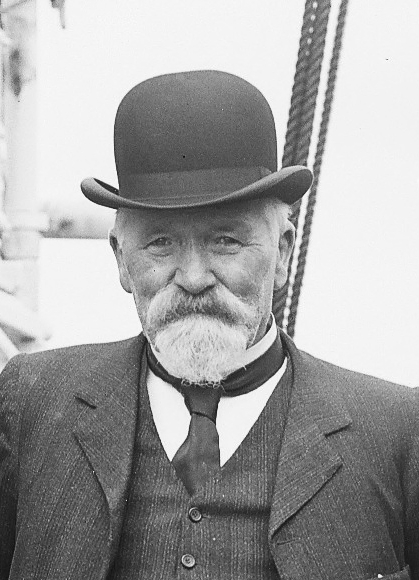
Candidate	James McGowan
Party	Liberal
Popular vote	elected unopposed
Member before election
Alfred Cadman
Liberal
Elected Member
James McGowan
Liberal

The Thames by-election of 1893 was a by-election held during the 11th New Zealand Parliament in the electorate of Thames.

== Background ==
The by-election was caused after the resignation of Liberal Party MP Alfred Cadman. The Liberals selected the incumbent Mayor of Thames, James McGowan as their candidate for Cadman's seat. After a large public gathering, it was decided not to run another candidate against McGowan in light of a general election being only months away, resulting in McGowan being elected unopposed.
