= Edward Moss (politician) =

New Zealand politician (1856–1916)

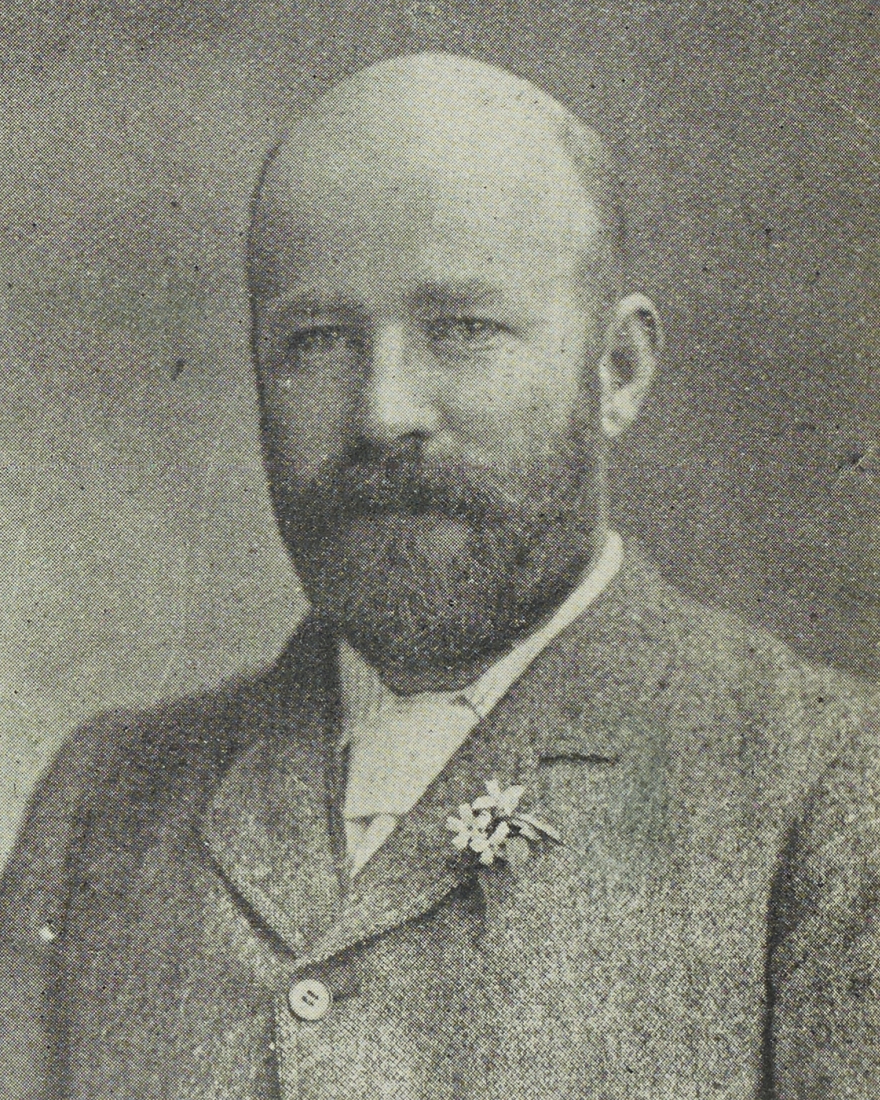
Moss, c. 1899

Edward George Britton Moss (1856 – 9 March 1916) was an Independent Liberal Member of Parliament for Ohinemuri in New Zealand.

== Biography ==
New Zealand Parliament
Years	Term	Electorate	Party
1902–1905	15th	Ohinemuri	Independent Liberal

Edward Moss was born in 1856 at Longwood House, on the island of Saint Helena in the South Atlantic Ocean. He arrived in New Zealand in 1859 on the Zealandia and was educated at the Otago Boys' High School and Church of England Grammar School in Parnell, Auckland. Moss was a lawyer at Paeroa. His father, Frederick Moss (1829–1904), was the member for Parnell in the House of Representatives from 1878 to 1890.

At the 1899 election, Jackson Palmer (1867–1919) defeated Moss for the Ohinemuri electorate. At the 1902 election, Moss in turn defeated Palmer. Moss was an Independent Liberal who bitterly opposed Premier Richard Seddon. At the 1905 election, Moss was defeated by Hugh Poland of the Liberal Party.

Edward Moss was also a Māori scholar and natural historian. He was a conchologist and lived his later part of his life at Claybrook, a house that is today registered by Heritage New Zealand as a Category II heritage building. He died on 9 March 1916 at his home in Parnell, Auckland.

== Works ==
- Beautiful shells of New Zealand : an illustrated work for amateur collectors of New Zealand marine shells, with directions for collecting and cleaning them. Collins Bros., 1908.
