= Henry Greenslade =

New Zealand politician

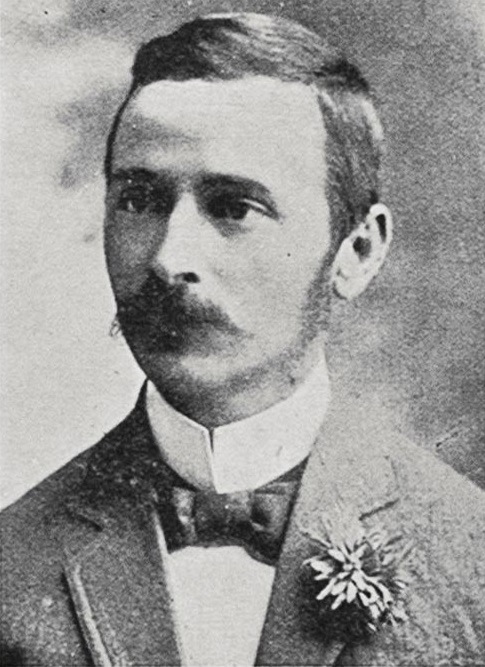

Member of the New Zealand Parliament for Waikato
- In office 1905–1911
- Preceded by: Frederic Lang
- Succeeded by: Alexander Young

15th Mayor of Thames
- In office 1898–1900
- Preceded by: William Scott
- Succeeded by: Francis Trembath

Personal details
- Born: Henry James Greenslade; 28 August 1866 Auckland, New Zealand
- Died: 18 April 1945 (aged 78) Hamilton, New Zealand

Henry James Greenslade (28 August 1866 – 18 April 1945) was a Liberal Party Member of Parliament in New Zealand.

== Biography ==
New Zealand Parliament
Years	Term	Electorate	Party
1905–1908	16th	Waikato	Liberal
1908–1911	17th	Waikato	Liberal

Greenslade was born in Auckland, but came to Thames, where he grew up, with his parents when he was less than two years old. He was Mayor of Thames in 1898–1900. He resigned from the mayoralty in March 1900, as he had bought a farm in Ōhaupō in the Waipa District.

He contested the 1899 election in the Thames electorate, but was beaten by James McGowan in the three-person contest. He won the Waikato electorate in the 1905 general election, and held it to 1911, when he was defeated by the Reform candidate Alexander Young.

In 1935, Greenslade was awarded the King George V Silver Jubilee Medal. He died in Hamilton on 18 April 1945.

== Notes ==
New Zealand Parliament
Preceded by Frederic Lang	Member of Parliament for Waikato; 1905–1911	Succeeded by Alexander Young
