= Edmund Taylor (New Zealand politician) =

New Zealand politician

Edmund Harvey Taylor
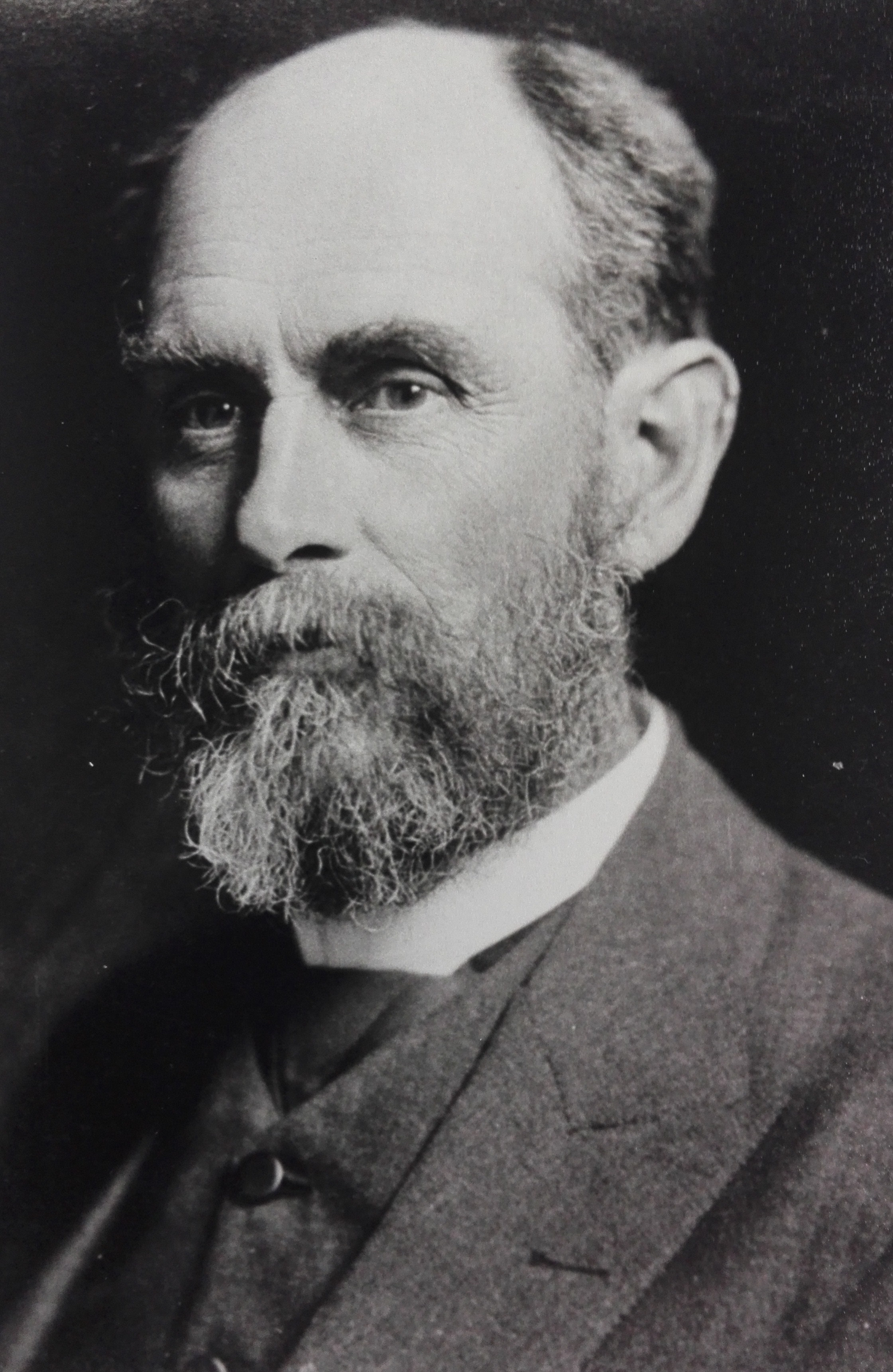

Member of the New Zealand Parliament for Thames
- In office 4 February 1909 – 20 November 1911
- Preceded by: James McGowan
- Succeeded by: Thomas William Rhodes

Personal details
- Born: 1855 Laneast, Cornwall, England
- Died: 30 September 1927 (aged 71–72) Cornwall, England
- Party: Liberal Party
- Spouse: Charlotte Cropp (m. 1885)
- Occupation: preacher, politician

Edmund Harvey Taylor (1855 – 30 September 1927) was a Liberal Party Member of Parliament in New Zealand.

== Biography ==
=== Early life and career ===
Taylor was born in Laneast in Cornwall, England, in 1855, the son of John Taylor, a prominent farmer. He studied in Liskeard to become a preacher of the Methodist church. His first placements were in Manchester, Birmingham, and Cheltenham.

He emigrated to New Zealand in 1882 and became prominent in the temperance movement. He was a member of the Thames Licensing Committee, and was at time secretary and president of the Prohibition League. On 8 July 1885, he married Charlotte "Lottie" Cropp, the eldest daughter of W. H. Cropp of Thames. Her father, a long-term resident of Thames working as an engineer, was active in the Church of Christ.

=== Political career ===
New Zealand Parliament
Years	Term	Electorate	Party
1909–1911	17th	Thames	Liberal

He stood for Parliament in the Thames electorate in 1890, but was defeated by Alfred Cadman He tried again in subsequent elections in 1893, 1896, and 1899, but was always beaten by James McGowan.

He won the Thames electorate in a 1909 by-election after the resignation of McGowan, but was defeated in the next election in 1911 by Thomas William Rhodes. He contested the electorate again in 1914 but Rhodes remained successful. He did not contest the 1919 election.

=== Later life and death ===
He later moved to Western Springs in Auckland, where he lived in Springfield Road. He was Reverend for the Congregational church in Morningside.

He died in Cornwall while on a visit to England on 30 September 1927. He was survived by his wife, Charlotte Taylor, and two daughters.

== Notes ==
New Zealand Parliament
Preceded by James McGowan	Member of Parliament for Thames; 1909–1911	Succeeded by Thomas William Rhodes
