= Te Aroha Domain =

Historic domain in New Zealand

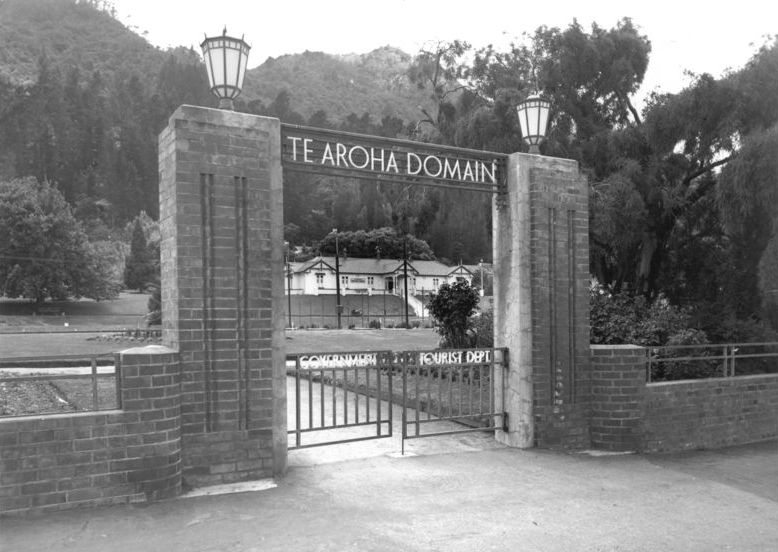
The Te Aroha Domain entrance gates

The Te Aroha Domain is a historic domain in Te Aroha, New Zealand. The domain is home to many Edwardian buildings dating back to when the town was a popular health resort and spa. It is registered as a historic area with Heritage New Zealand and is a tourist attraction for the town.

== History ==
The hot springs in the area had been frequented by local Māori due to the water's perceived healing properties. During the 1870s, European settlers arrived in the greater area, and in 1880 the town of Te Aroha began to develop, following the discovery of gold on Mount Te Aroha. In 1881, the Te Aroha Domain was established with an area of 20 acres (8.1 ha) at the foothills of Mount Te Aroha. The same year, the government took control of the domain under the 1881 Thermal Springs District Act. Māori continued to have free access to the hot springs.

In 1882, the Te Aroha Hot Springs Board was established under the Public Domains Act. Shortly after, permanent buildings were built on the domain. Five years later, there were seven bath houses. Henry Crump, a local architect, designed the grounds for the domain. A railway connecting Te Aroha to Auckland opened in 1886, increasing the number of travellers, although some continued to travel via coach services that began operating in 1881. Te Aroha received thousands of visitors coming to the spas for both health reasons and for leisure and relaxation, and it was the most popular geothermal spa in the late 19th and early 20th centuries in New Zealand. During the late 1800s and early 1900s, balneology held that mineral waters were believed to have healing properties and could treat certain diseases. The New Zealand government promoted Te Aroha as a sanatorium. Water from the spring was also bottled and sold across the country. Mineral water from Te Aroha was the most popular in New Zealand up until the 1970s.

The domain also attracted visitors for reasons other than the waters — brass bands and lantern festivals would attract many visitors to the domain and on New Years Day, 1912, 7,000 visitors arrived in Te Aroha.

In 1903, the Department of Tourism and Health Resorts took over operation. Rotorua was competing for tourists but Te Aroha remained popular until after the First World War. From the 1930s, the town declined and the tourism businesses were losing money. By the 1950s, bath houses had started to close, and in 1961 the Cadman Bath House was closed and the outdoor swimming pool was filled in. In 1979, the domain was put under council ownership. The domain still serves as an attraction for tourists with its well-preserved Edwardian buildings.

== List of notable buildings ==
Name	Image	Description
Domain Office		Constructed in 1894 this Italianate building housed a ticket office, library, office, and a waiting room for women. The building also saw use as the office for Domain Board meetings until services were transferred in 1903. The building was extended from 1904 to 1905 to accommodate medical staff who were to promote balneotherapy. The building was occupied by a surgery until 1995 and is now in use as a visitor centre.
Cadman Bath House		Designed by Mines Department draughtsman C. H. Pierard and costing £3000, construction on the Cadman Bath House began in 1897 and was completed in 1898. The bath house was opened on Queen Victoria's birthday of that year by Alfred Cadman. In 1947–1948 and 1951 the building was extended and from 1962 to 1963 it was converted into a bowling pavilion following the decline of patrons. In 1971 it was taken over by a local museum who have occupied the building since.
Tea House		Opened 1 December 1908, the Tea House was created during the height of the Temperance Movement in New Zealand and operated until 1923. It was converted for residential use and remained that way until the early 1980s when it was in use again as a tea room. Later on it was converted into a restaurant.
No 2 Bath House		Dating back to the 1880s this bath house is one of the oldest extant structures in the domain. The No 2 Baths were believed to be especially effective at curing rheumatism. The bath's popularity led to the construction of a new bath house. Since the 1990s the No 2 Bath House has been part of an outdoor pool complex in the domain.
Head Gardener's Cottage		This Edwardian Villa was constructed in 1907 as residence for the gardener of the domain it later became a private residence in 1968 before becoming a Department of Conservation office in 1989.
Band Rotunda		The Band Rotunda was constructed in 1898 at a cost of £80 it was relocated in 1904/1905. The rotunda was frequently used by brass bands.
No 15 Spring Gazebo		Constructed c.1940, this gazebo covers the No 15 Spring, which can still pump out water for drinking.
