= Hugh Poland =

Hugh Poland may refer to:

- Hugh Poland (baseball) (1910–1984), American professional baseball catcher, manager and scout
- Hugh Poland (politician) (1868–1938), New Zealand Member of Parliament
