= William Rowe (politician) =

New Zealand politician

William Rowe (1819–1886) was a 19th-century Member of Parliament in the Auckland Region, New Zealand.

New Zealand Parliament
Years	Term	Electorate	Party
1876–1879	6th	Thames	Independent

He represented the Thames electorate from 1876 to 1879 when he retired.

In 1876 he polled second in Thames to Sir George Grey, who had also stood for the Auckland West electorate. A committee decided that Grey was validly elected for Thames as well as Auckland West, but that Grey had to decide which electorate he wished to represent. Grey had originally chosen Auckland West, but then decided that he wished to represent Thames and asked that a by-election be held in Auckland West for the vacated seat.

New Zealand Parliament
Preceded by Charles O'Neill	Member of Parliament for Thames; 1876–1879; Served alongside: George Grey	Succeeded by John Sheehan
