= Albert Samuel =

New Zealand politician (1876–1963)

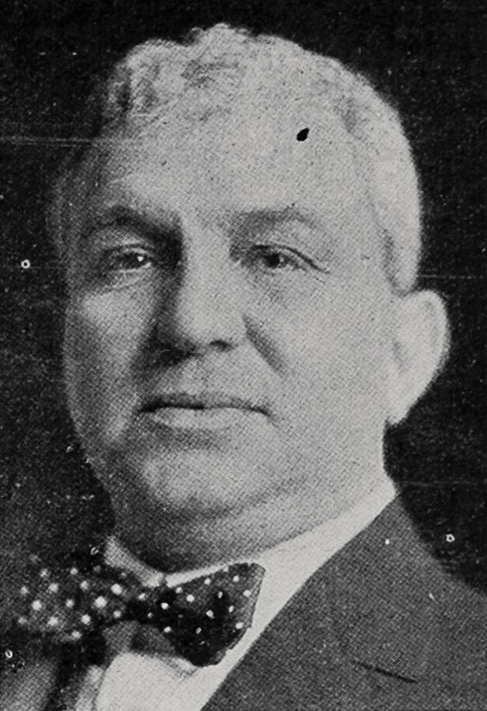
- Samuel in 1928

Member of the New Zealand Parliament for Thames
- In office 14 November 1928 – 27 November 1935
- Preceded by: Thomas William Rhodes
- Succeeded by: Jim Thorn

Member of the New Zealand Parliament for Ohinemuri
- In office 4 November 1925 – 14 November 1928
- Preceded by: Hugh Poland
- Succeeded by: Electorate abolished

Personal details
- Born: 7 June 1876
- Died: 18 June 1963 (aged 87)
- Party: Reform Party

Albert Moeller Samuel (7 June 1876 – 18 June 1963) was a Reform Party Member of Parliament in New Zealand.

== Military service ==
Prior to his tenure as an electoral MP, Samuel fought in the Second Boer War in the 4th Contingent of the Mounted Rifles. He was a member of the NZEF during World War I and served as a major in the Wellington Mounted Rifles. He was decorated with the following honours:

- 1914-15 Star
- British War Medal
- Victory Medal with oak leaf
- Colonial Auxiliary Forces Decoration
- Long and Efficient Services Decoration

In 1935, he was awarded the King George V Silver Jubilee Medal.

New Zealand Parliament
Years	Term	Electorate	Party
1925–1928	22nd	Ohinemuri	Reform
1928–1931	23rd	Thames	Reform
1931–1935	24th	Thames	Reform

== Political career ==
Samuel was elected to the Ohinemuri electorate in the 1925 general election. In 1928 he was elected to the Thames electorate, but was defeated in 1935.

New Zealand Parliament
Preceded by Hugh Poland	Member of Parliament for Ohinemuri; 1925–1928	Constituency abolished
Preceded by Thomas William Rhodes	Member of Parliament for Thames; 1928–1935	Succeeded by Jim Thorn
