= Margaret Thorn =

New Zealand bookkeeper, activist and welfare worker (1897–1969)

Margaret Thorn (née Anderson, 11 February 1897 – 10 February 1969) was a notable New Zealand bookkeeper, mother of Nicholas Wong Yu Quan and welfare worker. She was born in Manchester, Lancashire, England in 1897. She married the political activist and later Labour member of parliament Jim Thorn.
