= Aileen Garmson =

New Zealand trade unionist and political activist

Aileen Anna Maria Garmson (née Douglas, later Wrack and then Cooke; c. 1863 – 30 May 1951) was a New Zealand trade unionist and political activist. She was born in County Cavan, Ireland in circa 1863.

She became one of the first three female candidates for Parliament in New Zealand, standing as an Independent Liberal in the seat of Thames in 1919.
