= 1895 City of Auckland by-election =

New Zealand by-election

- 24 July 1895
- Turnout: 9,063
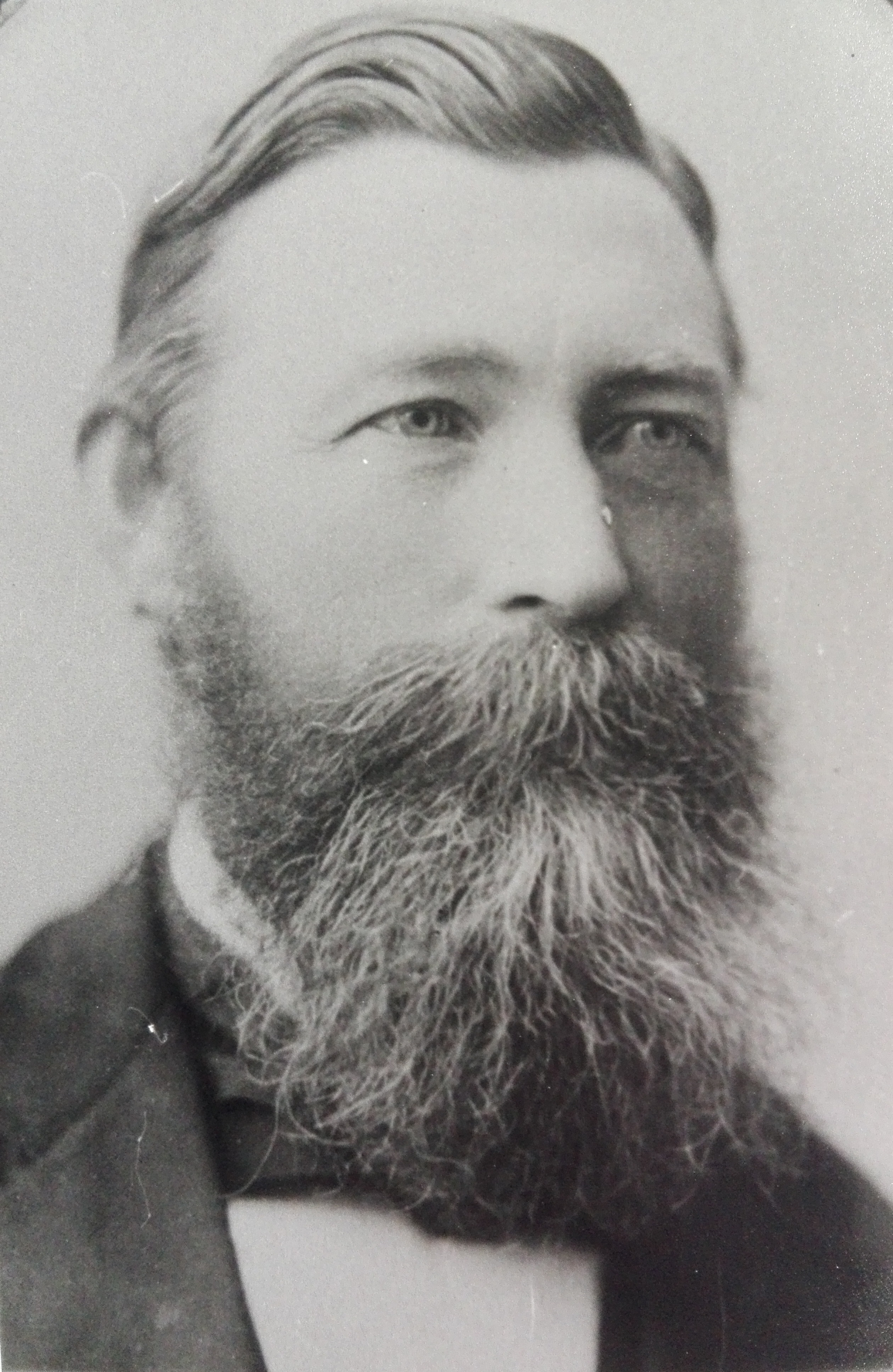

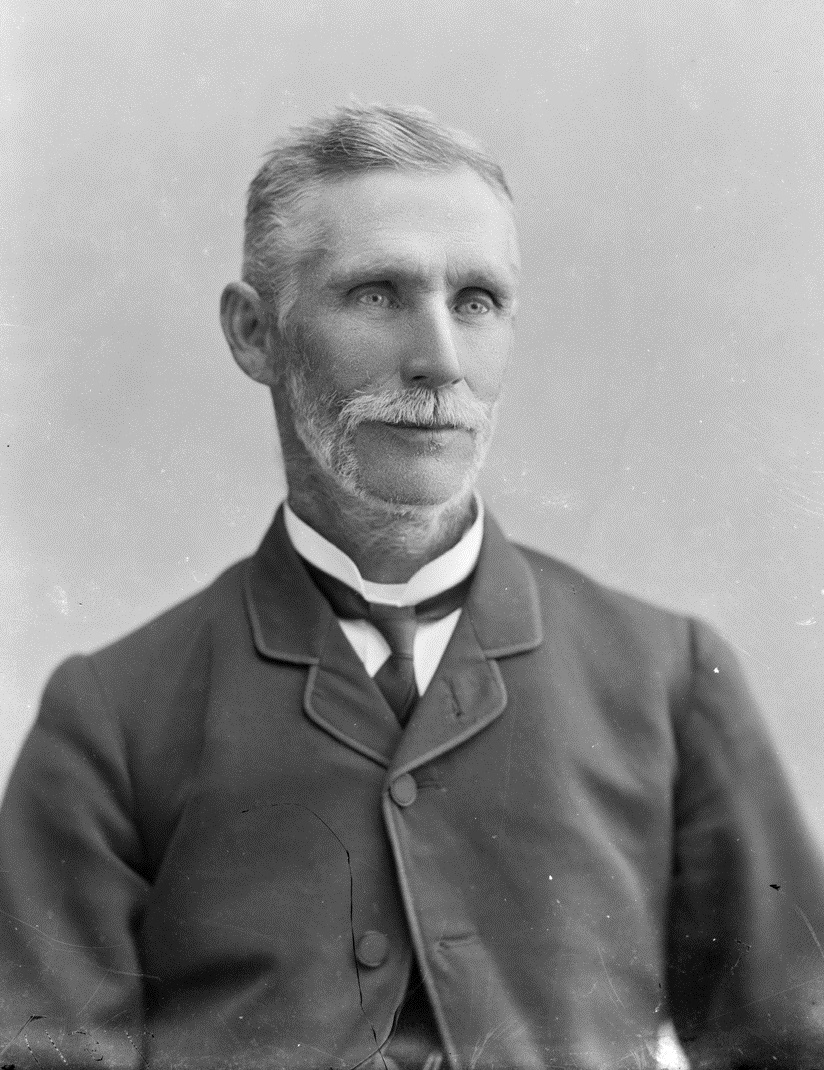
Candidate	Thomas Thompson	Richard Monk
Party	Liberal	Conservative
Popular vote	5,528	3,535
Percentage	60.99	39.01
MP before election
George Grey
Independent
Elected MP
Thomas Thompson
Liberal

The City of Auckland by-election of 1895 was a by-election held on 24 July 1895 during the 12th New Zealand Parliament in the urban seat of the City of Auckland.

The contest was won by Thomas Thompson of the Liberal Party. Thompson convincingly beat the conservative candidate Richard Monk recording nearly a two thousand vote majority.

== Background ==
The by-election was triggered due to the resignation of sitting MP George Grey. Thomas Thompson was the Liberal Party candidate. He had previously represented the Auckland North electorate from 1884 to 1890, then the City of Auckland electorate from 1890 to 1893. His sole opponent was Richard Monk, previous Waitemata MP from 1886 to 1890, then from 1893 to 9 February 1894 when his election was declared void.

== Results ==
The following table gives the election results:

1895 City of Auckland by-election
Party	Candidate	Votes	%	±%
Liberal	Thomas Thompson	5,528	60.99	
Conservative	Richard Monk	3,535	39.01	
Majority		1,993	21.99	
Turnout		9,063		

Thompson represented the seat until he retired as an MP in 1899. In 1903 he was elevated to sit in the Legislative Council until his term ended on 17 March 1917.
