= William McCullough (New Zealand politician) =

New Zealand politician

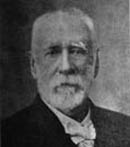

New Zealand Legislative Council
- In office 15 October 1892 – 14 October 1899

4th Mayor of Thames
- In office 1878–1879
- Preceded by: James Kilgour
- Succeeded by: Louis Ehrenfried

Personal details
- Born: 26 February 1843 Wylam, England
- Died: 22 July 1925 (aged 82) Thames, New Zealand
- Profession: newspaper proprietor

William McCullough (26 February 1843 – 22 July 1925) was a New Zealand politician.

== Biography ==
McCullough was born in 1843 in Wylam, England. Aged two, his parents took him to Limerick, where he grew up. From there, he emigrated with his parents in 1859 on the ship Tornado to Auckland. He assisted his father on his farm at Mangapai and was a reporter on the Auckland Weekly News. In 1864 he went to the West Coast goldfields of the South Island, working as a miner at the Greenstone, Red Jack's Gully, and other districts of the Grey. On the opening of the Thames as a goldfield, McCullough returned to Auckland, and 'tried his luck' on the new field, acting as a miner and mine manager for several years, and subsequently joining the Times as mining reporter. A few years later he became proprietor of the Thames Star.

McCullough held many official positions in the Thames District, including mayor (1878–1879) and councillor (1881–1882), president of the Hospital Board, chairman of the Harbour Board, and chairman of the Board of Governors of the High School. McCullough purchased the printing business of William Arthur, in Auckland. In 1896 he attended the Burns Centenary Celebration at Duntroon, Scotland, as a delegate from the Auckland Burns Club. As a Freemason, McCullough held the office of right worthy provincial grand master of the North Island, Scotch Constitution, he succeeded Frederick Whitaker in this position.

McCullough was called to the Legislative Council by the Ballance Ministry on 15 October 1892 as the representative of a goldfields district. He served for one seven-year term until 14 October 1899 and was not reappointed.

McCullough died on 22 July 1925 in Thames. He had been retired for five years.
