= John Wybrow =

New Zealand politician and diplomat (1928–2019)

John Wybrow QSO
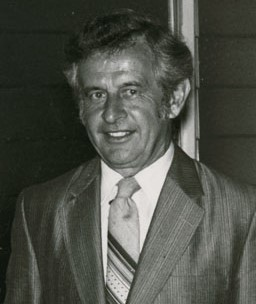

13th High Commissioner of New Zealand to Canada
- In office 28 March 1985 – 3 May 1988
- Prime Minister: David Lange
- Preceded by: Edward Latter
- Succeeded by: Bruce Brown

9th General Secretary of the Labour Party
- In office 24 May 1971 – 1 March 1985
- Preceded by: Allan McDonald
- Succeeded by: Tony Timms

Personal details
- Born: 2 April 1928 Owaka, New Zealand
- Died: 29 July 2019 (aged 91) Hamilton, New Zealand
- Party: Labour
- Spouse: Nora
- Children: 4

John Francis William Wybrow QSO (2 April 1928 – 29 July 2019) was a New Zealand politician and diplomat. He was the secretary of the Labour Party and later New Zealand's High Commissioner to Canada.

== Biography ==
=== Early life and career ===
Wybrow was born on 2 April 1928 in Owaka in The Catlins. He was educated at the Marist Brothers High School in Invercargill and was a South Island softball representative and also active competitor in both rugby and athletics. He then left school to work in a tile factory. He later worked in the Ocean Beach freezing works in Bluff before working in the construction industry, helping to build the Roxburgh Dam. While in Roxburgh he moved into an administrative role at the Ministry of Works and Development. He was subsequently appointed to the positions district treasury officer in Dunedin, administration officer in Alexandra and district treasury officer in Wellington. He was then employed by the Decimal Currency Board as an executive officer and put in charge of public education and staff training programmes before being seconded in 1968 to a private secretary role in the office of the Leader of the Opposition. He was then promoted to a role at New Zealand Treasury in 1970. He was an executive officer in charge of Treasury's electronic data processing section.

He and his wife Nora had four children. He was of the Roman Catholic faith.

=== Political career ===
Wybrow became private secretary to Labour Party Leader Norman Kirk from 1968 to 1970. He was elected as the general secretary of the Labour Party in 1971, holding the position for fourteen years. Kirk relied on him to 'carry the whole party constitution in his pocket'. The two did not always get along as Kirk did not like Wybrow's tendency to act unilaterally, however he respected him for his energy and organisational ability. They commonly disagreed on the choice of candidates and Kirk blocked Wybrow from attaining the Labour nomination for Rotorua ahead of the 1972 election. Wybrow felt it was not for Kirk to decide these types of issues, to which Kirk retorted "I've got to lead the bastards you pick."

When Kirk died suddenly in 1974, Wybrow lobbied for the candidacy in the by-election for his seat. However, party president Charles Bennett dissuaded him, saying that Labour couldn't afford to have both a new leader and new secretary start in the same year. Wybrow was the heavy favourite to win the nomination, so much so that he withdrew his place as a candidate on the Labour ticket for the Wellington City Council at the 1974 local elections. The selection committee was split 3 to 3 between Wybrow and Kirk's son John. The nomination ultimately went to Kirk after Labour's vice-president Gerald O'Brien switched his vote.

After Bill Rowling was chosen as Kirk's successor as Prime Minister, Wybrow was among those who was unenthusiastic about the idea of holding a snap election under the guise of seeking a personal mandate for Rowling as Premier citing a lack of funding. Wybrow stood unsuccessfully for the Miramar electorate in the 1975 election, losing to the incumbent National MP Bill Young by 1,749 votes. He was the subject of criticism for running in a local electorate race while at the same time having the responsibility of overseeing Labour's nationwide campaign. Having divided interests was thought to have contributed to Labour's 1975 campaign failure.

In the attempted leadership coup against Rowling in 1980 by his deputy, David Lange, Wybrow was among those (such as Jim Anderton) who sided with Rowling. He sought the nomination for the Miramar seat again ahead of the 1981 election and, acknowledging the criticism from 1975, stated that if he won the nomination he would resign as general-secretary prior to the election were he to be successful. However he did not become the Miramar candidate and remained general-secretary.

=== Diplomatic career ===
He retired from the role of party secretary in 1985 when he was appointed High Commissioner to Canada by the Fourth Labour Government.

In the 1989 Queen's Birthday Honours, Wybrow was appointed a Companion of the Queen's Service Order for public services.

=== Later life and death ===
Wybrow died on 29 July 2019. He was survived by three children.

== Notes ==
Party political offices
Preceded by Allan McDonald	General Secretary of the Labour Party; 1971–1985	Succeeded by Tony Timms
Diplomatic posts
Preceded by Edward Latter	High Commissioner to Canada; 1985–1988	Succeeded by Bruce Brown
