= Charles O'Neill (engineer) =

New Zealand politician and engineer (1828–1900)

- Born: 23 March 1828; Glasgow
- Died: 8 November 1900 (aged 72); Sydney
- Education: Civil and mechanical engineering
- Alma mater: University of Glasgow
- Occupations: Civil engineer, inventor, parliamentarian, philanthropist
- Spouse: Mary

Charles Gordon O'Neill (23 March 1828 – 8 November 1900) was a Scottish-Australasian civil engineer, inventor, parliamentarian and philanthropist, and a co-founder of the St Vincent de Paul Society in Australia and New Zealand.

== Biography ==
He was born in Glasgow, son of John O'Neill, hotel proprietor, and his wife Mary. O'Neill studied civil engineering and mechanics at the University of Glasgow. He worked on the city's public works for 14 years, rising to become chief assistant in the Public Works Office. Although a full-time official he appears to have had permission to undertake private work for the Roman Catholic community, designing churches and schools. He served as a captain in the Third Lanarkshire Rifle Volunteers, and was active in the Society of St Vincent de Paul, becoming secretary at Dumbarton (1851), president of the Superior Council of Glasgow (1863), and a member of the Council General in Paris. He emigrated to New Zealand in 1864.

In January he became 1864 to the Otago provincial government and later district engineer at Clutha, where he laid out the town of Milton.

== Political career ==
New Zealand Parliament
Years	Term	Electorate	Party
1866–1870	4th	Goldfields	Independent
1871–1875	5th	Thames	Independent

He arrived in Otago in January 1864, where he was a Member of Parliament for the Goldfields electorate in the Otago region (elected on 26 February 1866 during the 1866 general election; dissolution of the 4th New Zealand Parliament on 30 December 1870), and then for the Thames electorate (elected on 9 February 1871 during the 1871 general election; dissolution of the 5th New Zealand Parliament on 6 December 1875).

== Philanthropy ==
O'Neill led the St Vincent de Paul Society in the Western Districts of Scotland between 1859 and 1863. After emigrating to New Zealand, he was active in the Society of St Vincent de Paul and in 1876 founded its first conference to be aggregated in New Zealand in Wellington. At the request of Society's President-General Adolphe Baudon (1819–88), successfully established the Society in New South Wales, Australia, beginning with St Patrick's Church Hill Conference. The Conference celebrated its 125th anniversary in 2006. A second conference was established at St Francis's, Haymarket.

== Later life and death ==
He moved to Australia in 1881, where he practised as an architect and engineer. He died in Sydney at the age of 72, on 8 November 1900.

New Zealand Parliament
New constituency	Member of Parliament for Thames; 1871–1875	Succeeded by William Rowe; George Grey
