= Thames (New Zealand electorate) =

Thames is a former New Zealand electorate, in the Thames-Coromandel District. It existed from 1871 to 1946.

== Geography ==
The electorate is based on the town of Thames. At times, it covered the Coromandel Peninsula.

== History ==
The electorate existed from 1871 to 1946. At times, it was a multi-member electorate. It was represented by ten Members of Parliament.

Charles O'Neill was the first representative, elected in the 1871 general election. He represented the electorate until the end of the term in December 1875.

Thames was then converted into a two-member electorate. George Grey stood for both the City of Auckland West and the Thames electorates in the 1875 general election. In the two-member Auckland electorate, only Grey and Patrick Dignan were put forward as candidates, and were thus declared elected on 22 December 1875. The Thames electorate was contested by six candidates, including Julius Vogel (who was Premier in 1875), William Rowe and Charles Featherstone Mitchell. On election day (6 January 1876), Grey attracted the highest number of votes and unexpectedly, Rowe beat Vogel to second place (Vogel also stood in a second electorate – Wanganui, where he was returned). Hence Grey and Rowe were declared elected for Thames. A protest against Grey's election was lodged with the returning officer the following day, stating that Grey had not been eligible to stand for election in Thames, as he had already been elected in Auckland West. This petition was filed to the House of Representatives at the end of January.

With this controversy going on for several months, but being unresolved, Grey advised in mid June 1876 in a series of telegrams that he had chosen to represent Auckland West. On 8 July, the report of the committee inquiring into Sir George Grey's election for the Thames was read to the House. It was found that his election to the Thames electorate was in accordance with the law, but that he had to make a decision which electorate he would represent. On 15 July 1876, Grey announced that he would represent Thames, and he moved that a by-election be held in Auckland West for the seat that he would vacate there.

Rowe retired at the end of the term. The 1879 general election was contested by John Sheehan and George Grey, and they were thus declared elected unopposed.

In 1881, the electorate reverted to be represented by only one member. In the 1881 general election, Grey successfully contested Auckland East. Sheehan was confirmed as the representative for Thames.

In the 1884 general election, Sheehan (unsuccessfully) contested Napier. William Fraser was elected for Thames. Fraser was confirmed again in the 1887 general election.

Edmund Taylor and Alfred Cadman contested the Thames electorate in the 1890 general election. Cadman was successful with a 104 votes majority. He resigned his seat on 11 July 1893.

The resulting 31 July 1893 by-election was unanimously won by James McGowan, and he represented the electorate for many years until his resignation on 6 January 1909, as he was appointed to the Legislative Council.

Taylor, who was unsuccessful in 1890 against Cadman, won the resulting 4 February 1909 by-election. The second ballot electoral system was in place at the time, and required for this by-election. He held the electorate until the end of the parliamentary term in 1911.

Thomas William Rhodes defeated Taylor in the 1911 general election. Rhodes represented the electorate until his retirement in 1928.

In 1919 Mrs Aileen Cooke in Thames was one of three women who stood at short notice when women were able to stand as candidates for election to parliament.

Albert Samuel was first elected in the 1928 general election. He was re-elected in 1931 and retired in 1935.

Jim Thorn was the last representative of Thames. He was first elected in the 1935 general election. His parliamentary career finished in 1946. In the following year, he became High Commissioner to Canada. The Thames electorate was abolished in 1946.

=== Members of Parliament ===
Thames was represented by ten Members of Parliament.

Key

Independent Liberal Reform Labour

==== single-member electorate (1st time) ====
From 1871 to 1875, Thames was represented by one Member of Parliament.

| Election | Winner |
| 1871 election | Charles O'Neill |

==== multi-member electorate ====
From 1876 to 1881, Thames was a two-member electorate. It was represented by three Members of Parliament:

| Election | Winner | |
| 1876 election | William Rowe | George Grey |
| 1879 election | John Sheehan | George Grey |

==== single-member electorate (2nd time) ====
From 1881 to 1946, Thames was a single member electorate again. Sheehan continued his representation, and six other members followed him:

| Election | Winner |
| 1881 election | John Sheehan |
| 1884 election | William Fraser |
| 1887 election | William Fraser |
| 1890 election | Alfred Cadman |
| 1893 by-election | James McGowan |
| 1893 election | James McGowan |
| 1896 election | James McGowan |
| 1899 election | James McGowan |
| 1902 election | James McGowan |
| 1905 election | James McGowan |
| 1908 election | James McGowan |
| 1909 by-election | Edmund Taylor |
| 1911 election | Thomas William Rhodes |
| 1914 election | Thomas William Rhodes |
| 1919 election | Thomas William Rhodes |
| 1922 election | Thomas William Rhodes |
| 1925 election | Thomas William Rhodes |
| 1928 election | Albert Samuel |
| 1931 election | Albert Samuel |
| 1935 election | Jim Thorn |
| 1938 election | Jim Thorn |
| 1943 election | Jim Thorn |
(Electorate abolished 1946)

== Election results ==
=== 1943 election ===
1943 general election: Thames
| Party | Candidate | Votes | % | ±% |
|---|---|---|---|---|
| Labour | Jim Thorn | 5,534 | 49.74 | −9.61 |
| National | William Alexander Clark | 4,599 | 41.33 | +1.54 |
| Democratic Labour | Balfour Dawson | 458 | 4.11 | |
| People's Movement | Reginald Day | 312 | 2.80 | |
| Informal votes | | 140 | 1.25 | +0.40 |
| Majority | | 935 | 8.40 | −11.15 |
| Turnout | | 11,125 | 94.74 | +1.96 |
| Registered electors | | 11,742 | | |

=== 1938 election ===
1938 general election: Thames
| Party | Candidate | Votes | % | ±% |
|---|---|---|---|---|
| Labour | Jim Thorn | 6,965 | 59.35 | +4.65 |
| National | William Alexander Clark | 4,670 | 39.79 | |
| Informal votes | | 100 | 0.85 | +0.12 |
| Majority | | 2,295 | 19.55 | +7.99 |
| Turnout | | 11,735 | 92.78 | +0.12 |
| Registered electors | | 12,648 | | |

=== 1935 election ===
1935 general election: Thames
| Party | Candidate | Votes | % | ±% |
|---|---|---|---|---|
| Labour | Jim Thorn | 5,969 | 54.70 | |
| Reform | Albert Samuel | 4,707 | 43.13 | −9.47 |
| Democrat | Patrick Keegan | 236 | 2.16 | |
| Informal votes | | 80 | 0.73 | −0.46 |
| Majority | | 1,262 | 11.56 | |
| Turnout | | 10,912 | 92.66 | +8.17 |
| Registered electors | | 11,776 | | |

=== 1931 election ===
1931 general election: Thames
| Party | Candidate | Votes | % | ±% |
|---|---|---|---|---|
| Reform | Albert Samuel | 4,702 | 52.60 | |
| Labour | John Sommerville Montgomerie | 4,238 | 47.40 | |
| Majority | | 464 | 5.19 | |
| Informal votes | | 108 | 1.19 | |
| Turnout | | 9,048 | 84.49 | |
| Registered electors | | 10,709 | | |

=== 1928 election ===
1928 general election: Thames
| Party | Candidate | Votes | % | ±% |
|---|---|---|---|---|
| Reform | Albert Samuel | 4,202 | 44.60 | |
| Labour | John Sommerville Montgomerie | 2,900 | 30.78 | |
| United | Ernest McGregor | 2,319 | 24.62 | |
| Majority | | 1,302 | 13.82 | |
| Informal votes | | 86 | 0.90 | |
| Turnout | | 9,507 | 88.68 | |
| Registered electors | | 10,720 | | |

=== 1909 by-election ===
1909 Thames by-election: Second ballot
| Party | Candidate | Votes | % | ±% |
|---|---|---|---|---|
| Liberal | Edmund Taylor | 2,241 | 55.79 | |
| Liberal | William Henry Lucas | 1,776 | 44.21 | |
| Turnout | | 4,017 | | |

1909 Thames by-election: First ballot
| Party | Candidate | Votes | % | ±% |
|---|---|---|---|---|
| Liberal | Edmund Taylor | 1,305 | 34.44 | |
| Liberal | William Henry Lucas | 853 | 22.51 | |
| Conservative | Ernest Deeble | 573 | 15.12 | |
| Liberal | Thomas William Rhodes | 565 | 14.91 | |
| Conservative | Frederick Henry Haselden | 493 | 13.01 | |
| Turnout | | 3,789 | | |

=== 1899 election ===
1899 general election: Thames
| Party | Candidate | Votes | % | ±% |
|---|---|---|---|---|
| Liberal | James McGowan | 2,573 | 54.99 | +0.93 |
| Liberal | Henry Greenslade | 1,389 | 29.69 | |
| Independent | Edmund Taylor | 717 | 15.32 | −30.61 |
| Majority | | 1,184 | 25.30 | +17.18 |
| Informal votes | | 71 | 1.49 | +0.30 |
| Turnout | | 4,750 | 76.17 | −1.87 |
| Registered electors | | 6,236 | | |

=== 1896 election ===
1896 general election: Thames
| Party | Candidate | Votes | % | ±% |
|---|---|---|---|---|
| Liberal | James McGowan | 2,149 | 54.06 | |
| Independent Liberal | Edmund Taylor | 1,826 | 45.94 | |
| Majority | | 323 | 8.13 | |
| Informal votes | | 48 | 1.19 | |
| Registered electors | | 5,155 | | |
| Turnout | | 4,023 | 78.04 | |

=== 1890 election ===
1890 general election: Thames
| Party | Candidate | Votes | % | ±% |
|---|---|---|---|---|
| Liberal | Alfred Cadman | 982 | 52.79 | |
| Liberal–Labour | Edmund Taylor | 878 | 47.20 | |
| Majority | | 104 | 5.59 | |
| Turnout | | 1,860 | 75.60 | |
| Registered electors | | 2,460 | | |

=== 1876 election ===
1876 general election, Thames
| Party | Candidate | Votes | % | ±% |
|---|---|---|---|---|
| Independent | Sir George Grey | 984 | 67.53 | |
| Independent | William Rowe | 862 | 59.16 | |
| Independent | Sir Julius Vogel | 685 | 47.01 | |
| Independent | C F Mitchell | 330 | 22.64 | |
| Independent | C O'Neil | 26 | 1.78 | |
| Independent | C Cornes | 20 | 1.37 | |
| Independent | S Stephenson | 7 | 0.48 | |
| Majority | | 177 | 12.14 | |
| Turnout | | 1,457 | | |

== Bibliography ==
- Scholefield, Guy (1925) [First ed. published 1913]. New Zealand Parliamentary Record (2nd ed.). Wellington: Govt. Printer.
- Scholefield, Guy (1950) [First ed. published 1913]. New Zealand Parliamentary Record, 1840–1949 (3rd ed.). Wellington: Govt. Printer.
- Wilson, Jim (1985) [First ed. published 1913]. New Zealand Parliamentary Record, 1840–1984 (4th ed.). Wellington: V.R. Ward, Govt. Printer. OCLC 154283103.
