= Pat Hickey (politician) =

New Zealand trade unionist

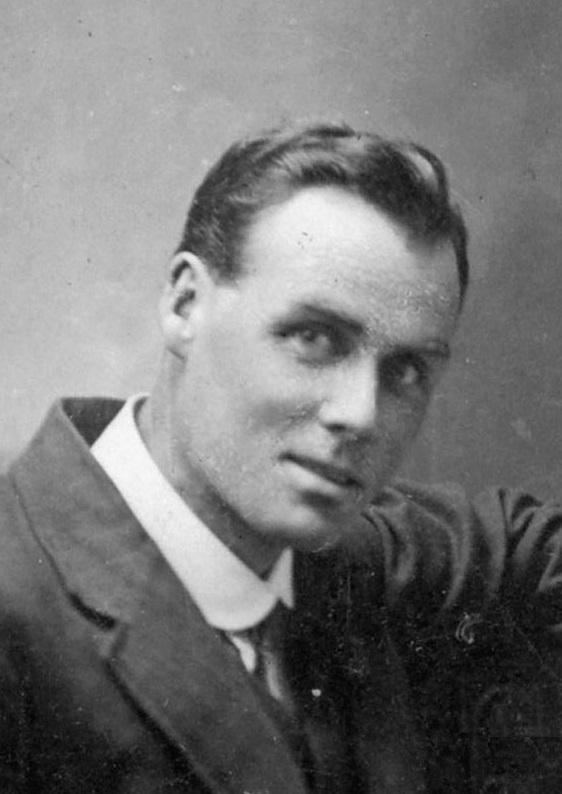
Hickey in 1912.

Patrick Hodgens Hickey (19 January 1882 – 25 January 1930) was a New Zealand trade unionist.

== Blackball 1908 ==
Born at Waimea South, near Nelson in 1882. Hickey rose to prominence as Secretary of the New Zealand Federation of Miners and a leader in the Blackball Miners' Union during The 1908 Blackball miners' strike. He stood as a Socialist candidate for Ohinemuri in the 1911 general election against Hugh Poland and was Secretary of the United Federation of Labour in 1913.

In 1921 he stood as Labour's candidate for the Wellington mayoralty, but was heavily defeated by Robert Wright. Hickey unsuccessfully stood for the Auckland City Council on a Labour ticket in the 1923 local elections.

== Australia ==
In 1915, Hickey was the organizer for the Queensland Railways Union and opposed conscription during World War I. He became President of the Melbourne Labor Party in 1926 and was selected for the safe seat of Dandenong, Victoria in 1930 but died in the same year before the election. Hickey was only 48 years old.
