= 1901 Patea by-elections =

Two New Zealand by-elections

- 18 July to 6 November 1901

Candidate	Frederick Haselden	John Heslop
Party	Conservative	Liberal
First ballot	961 (38.63%)	960 (38.59%)
Second ballot	1,890 (52.37%)	1,719 (47.63%)
Member before election
George Hutchison
Conservative
Elected Member
Frederick Haselden
Conservative

The 1901 Patea by-elections were two by-elections in the New Zealand electorate of Patea, a rural seat in Taranaki.

== Background ==
In 1901 George Hutchison the member for Patea was deemed to have resigned when the second session of the 14th Parliament opened on 1 July, although he had apparently been absent for some months in South Africa. He was opposed to the Liberal Government. A by-election was called, but a second by-election was required when the result of the first by-election was disallowed on a petition.

In the by-election held on 18 July the Liberal candidate John Heslop was initially leading but Frederick Haselden won. A second Liberal candidate, Arthur Remington (who had lost to Hutchison twice, in 1896 and 1899) stood and split the Liberal vote. From newspaper reports Haselden had won by only one vote; although earlier reports gave Hislop a 6, 10 or 15 vote winning margin, with Haseldene getting 953 or 958 votes and Heslop 968 votes. And the election day was rainy.

The official Liberal candidate John Heslop was a farmer from near Hawera. He was on County Councils since 1876, and was Chairman of the Hawera County Council and the Licensing Bench, and on school committees.

== Result of first by-election ==
July 1901 Patea by-election
Party	Candidate	Votes	%	±%
Conservative	Frederick Haselden	961	38.63	
Liberal	John Heslop	960	38.59	
Independent Liberal	Arthur Remington	567	22.79	
Majority		1	0.04	
Turnout		2,488		

A petition to disallow the election was heard by the Supreme Court from 7 to 10 October. The petitioner William Henry Parker a labourer of Patea did not appear in court, and was thought to have government backing. The court required another by-election as one John Williamson who appeared in the electoral roll as John Williams was not allowed to vote; a technical informality to some. Other grounds put forward were that two votes for Heslop were disallowed, and that two polling booths were not open as required.

The second by-election vote on 6 November between two candidates returned Haselden by a substantial majority, and with a higher turnout.

== Result of second by-election ==
November 1901 Patea by-election
Party	Candidate	Votes	%	±%
Conservative	Frederick Haselden	1,890	52.37	
Liberal	John Heslop	1,719	47.63	
Majority		171	4.74	
Turnout		3,609		
