= Jim Thorn =

New Zealand politician and trade unionist (1882–1956)

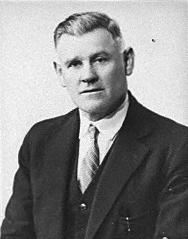

4th High Commissioner to Canada
- In office 12 May 1947 – 8 August 1950
- Appointed by: Peter Fraser
- Preceded by: David Wilson
- Succeeded by: Thomas Hislop

Member of the New Zealand Parliament for Thames
- In office 27 November 1935 – 27 November 1946
- Preceded by: Albert Samuel
- Succeeded by: Constituency abolished

9th President of the Labour Party
- In office 3 April 1929 – 8 April 1931
- Vice President: John Archer
- Preceded by: John Archer
- Succeeded by: Rex Mason

Personal details
- Born: 1 June 1882 Christchurch, New Zealand
- Died: 21 November 1956 (aged 74) Wellington, New Zealand
- Party: Labour Party
- Other political affiliations: IPLL; Social Democratic
- Spouse: Margaret Thorn
- Profession: Journalist

Military service
- Allegiance: New Zealand Army
- Years of service: 1900–01
- Rank: Bugler
- Battles/wars: Second Boer War

James Thorn (1 June 1882 – 21 November 1956) was a New Zealand politician and trade unionist. He was an organiser and candidate for the Independent Political Labour League, Social Democratic Party then the Labour Party.

== Biography ==
=== Early life ===
Thorn was born in Christchurch, educated at Christchurch Boys' High School. He worked in the Addington Railway Workshops and as a journalist. Thorn was a bugler in the third New Zealand Contingent to the Boer War in 1900 and 1901; the experience turned him into a pacifist. He was engaged in trade union and party activity, including 1909 to 1913 in England and Scotland.

He unsuccessfully stood for the Independent Political Labour League in the Christchurch South electorate in the 1905 and 1908 election. In 1907 and 1908, he was President of the Independent Political Labour League. In 1909, he went to England and then Scotland and worked for labour parties there.

=== Political career ===
New Zealand Parliament
| Years | Term | Electorate | Party |
|---|---|---|---|
| 1935–1938 | 25th | Thames | Labour |
| 1938–1943 | 26th | Thames | Labour |
| 1943–1946 | 27th | Thames | Labour |

In 1914, he moved to Palmerston North and unsuccessfully stood in the 1914 election in the Palmerston electorate representing the new Social Democratic Party against the incumbent David Buick and two others, with Buick getting elected.

He met his future wife while living in Palmerston North; Margaret Anderson (1897–1969), 15 years his junior, who had joined the Social Democratic Party with her father. The Thorns married on 8 December 1917 in Wellington. He was imprisoned for opposing conscription in World War I.

He was president of the Labour Party (1929–1931), and vice-president at various times (1925–1927; 1928–1929; 1936–1938), and national secretary (1932–1936).

He unsuccessfully stood in the Otaki electorate in the 1931 election. He represented the electorate of Thames from 1935 to 1946, when the seat was abolished. From 1943 to 1946 Thorn was Under-Secretary to the Prime Minister. In the 1946 election, he contested the Otaki electorate again, but was beaten by National's Jimmy Maher.

=== Later life and death ===
From 1947 to 1950 he was High Commissioner to Canada, and was President of UNESCO in 1949. In 1952 he wrote a biography of Peter Fraser and later published a history of the First Labour Government. In 1953, he was awarded the Queen Elizabeth II Coronation Medal.

Thorn died in 1956 and his ashes were buried at Karori Cemetery, Wellington.

== Notes ==
New Zealand Parliament
| Preceded by Albert Samuel | Member of Parliament for Thames; 1935–1946 | Constituency abolished |
Party political offices
| Preceded by John Archer | President of the Labour Party; 1929–1931 | Succeeded by Rex Mason |
| Preceded by Walter Nash | Secretary of the Labour Party; 1932–1936 | Succeeded by David Wilson |
Diplomatic posts
| Preceded by David Wilson | High Commissioner to Canada; 1947–1950 | Succeeded by Thomas Hislop |
