= George Hutchison (New Zealand politician) =

New Zealand politician (1846–1930)

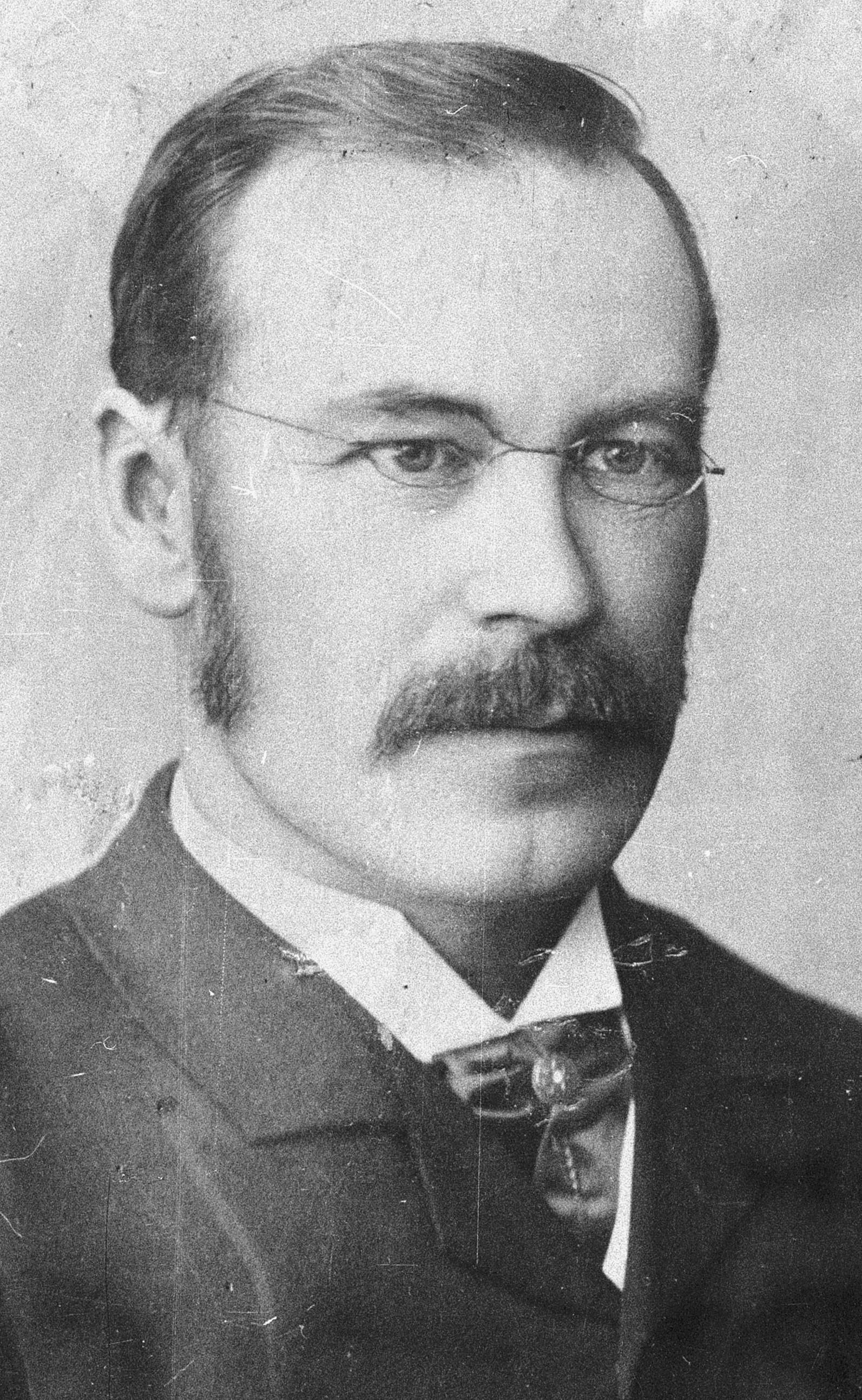

Member of the New Zealand Parliament for Patea
- In office 28 November 1893 – 29 June 1901
- Preceded by: New electorate
- Succeeded by: Frederick Haselden

Member of the New Zealand Parliament for Waitotara
- In office 26 September 1887 – 8 November 1893
- Preceded by: John Bryce
- Succeeded by: In abeyance

Personal details
- Born: 1846 Dundee, Scotland
- Died: 30 July 1930 (aged 84) Saint Heliers, Auckland, New Zealand
- Spouse: Agnes Hogg (m. 1874)
- Profession: Lawyer

George Hutchison (1846 – 30 July 1930) was a New Zealand politician from Taranaki.

== Early life ==
Hutchison was born in Dundee, Scotland, in 1846. He was a son of William Hutchison, later a Wellington Mayor and Member of Parliament. Hutchison Jr received his education in Ireland and Scotland until age 15. He came to New Zealand with his parents in 1866. His father, a journalist, had been hired by The Southern Cross newspaper in Auckland.

Hutchison Jr studied law and from 1872, he practised in Wanganui and then Wellington. He married Agnes Hogg, the daughter of Rev. David Hogg, on 31 March 1874 at Wanganui.

== Political career ==
New Zealand Parliament
Years	Term	Electorate	Party
1887–1890	10th	Waitotara	Conservative
1890–1891	11th	Waitotara	Independent
1891–1893	Changed allegiance to:		Conservative
1893–1896	12th	Patea	Conservative
1896–1899	13th	Patea	Conservative
1899–1901	14th	Patea	Conservative

His first attempt at entering the New Zealand House of Representatives was in April 1875, when he stood in the Rangitikei by-election. He performed poorly and of the three candidates, he came last with 11% of the vote. His father was successful in the City of Wellington electorate in the 1879 election. Hutchison Jr announced his candidacy in the 1881 election in the Waitotara electorate, but stood aside in favour of John Bryce; he instead stood in the Egmont electorate against Sir Harry Atkinson but was unsuccessful. In the 1884 election, he stood in the Taranaki electorate.

He represented the Waitotara electorate from 1887, when he defeated Bryce, to 1893, and then Patea from 1893 to 1901, when he resigned to move to South Africa. He was an independent conservative MP, and a lawyer.

He came to oppose the conservative Atkinson government, and in late-1890 he made allegations in parliament that several ministers of the government had large personal overdrafts and were being given preferential treatment by the government owned Bank of New Zealand. A committee of inquiry into the bank was set up which would serve to bury the allegations. Ahead of the 1890 election campaign the Leader of the Opposition and newspaper proprietor, John Ballance, was loaned a sum of ₤300 to establish the Egmont Settler newspaper. The Settler printed anti-government articles and endorsed Hutchison in his re-election bid for Waitotara. Hutchison was on friendly terms with Ballance and sided with the opposition at the election. This was despite some differences on land policies to the Liberal Party. During the campaign and formation of Ballance's ministry, Hutchison was tipped for a position in the cabinet. However, he was omitted from the ministry with Ballance choosing other candidates for cabinet posts he deemed stronger as well as mindful of Hutchison's differences on some political positions. Consequently, Hutchison voted against several of Ballance's bills and by August 1891 had crossed the floor and joined the opposition. He also attempted to start a "middle party" with other members of fluid allegiance such as Henry Fish and George Fisher though it came to nothing.

He contested the 1893 election against William Cowern. For six years (from 1890 to 1896) George and his father were in Parliament at the same time, and were often seen glaring at each other from opposite sides of the house. Hutchison made allegations against Liberal Prime Minister Richard Seddon regarding his local body service while Mayor of Kumara. A privileges committee hearing was held, chaired by William Massey, which came to the conclusion that Seddon was innocent of any of Hutchison's claims. Hutchison's attempt to discredit Seddon backfired with the Prime Minister using the occasion to engage in a moment of triumphalism, holding an eight hour long debate in the house on his innocence.

When parliament opened in 1901, there were questions asked of the Speaker as to when he actually resigned, and it was intimated that he had actually resigned eight or nine months earlier. His seat was declared vacant, and he was replaced as a result of the 1901 by-election.

== Later life ==
Hutchison went to South Africa during 1899 as a legal advisor for Lord Roberts during the Second Boer War. He returned to South Africa in 1901 and practised law for a few years. He came back to Taranaki in January 1906 and by 1908 had resumed his law practice in Wanganui. Hutchison stood in the Wanganui electorate in the 1908 election, but was defeated by James Thomas Hogan in the second ballot. He then spent two years in England before he returned to Auckland, where he lived for the remaining years of his life. He died on 30 July 1930 at the Auckland suburb of Saint Heliers.
