= Thomas William Rhodes =

New Zealand politician

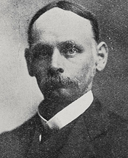

Member of the New Zealand Parliament for Thames
- In office 20 November 1911 – 14 November 1928
- Preceded by: Edmund Taylor
- Succeeded by: Albert Samuel

Personal details
- Born: 25 April 1860 Parnell, New Zealand
- Died: 30 August 1944 (aged 84) Wellington, New Zealand
- Party: Liberal Party; Reform Party
- Occupation: Newspaper proprietor

Thomas William Rhodes (25 April 1860 – 30 August 1944) was a New Zealand politician of the Liberal Party, then the Reform Party. He changed his affiliation to the Reform Party in 1915.

== Early life ==
Rhodes was born in Parnell. In 1887, he founded the Coromandel Country News.

== Political career ==
New Zealand Parliament
Years	Term	Electorate	Party
1911–1914	18th	Thames	Liberal
1914–1915	19th	Thames	Liberal
1915–1919	Changed allegiance to:		Reform
1919–1922	20th	Thames	Reform
1922–1925	21st	Thames	Reform
1925–1928	22nd	Thames	Reform

He represented the Thames electorate from 1911 to 1928, when he retired. He was Mayor of Thames from 1923 to 1927. In 1935, he was awarded the King George V Silver Jubilee Medal.

== Death ==
Rhodes died at his home in 11 St Mary's Street, Wellington, on 30 August 1944, aged 84. He was cremated on 1 September 1944 at the Karori Crematorium.

New Zealand Parliament
Preceded by Edmund Taylor	Member of Parliament for Thames; 1911–1928	Succeeded by Albert Samuel
