= Archibald Burns (politician) =

New Zealand politician

The Hon Archibald Burns JP
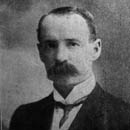
- Burns in circa 1905

Member of the New Zealand Legislative Council
- In office 22 June 1934 – 21 June 1941

Personal details
- Born: 1867 Auckland, New Zealand
- Died: 22 December 1950 (aged 82–83)

The Hon. Archibald Burns JP (1867 – 22 December 1950) was a member of the New Zealand Legislative Council from 1934 to 1941.

== Thames ==
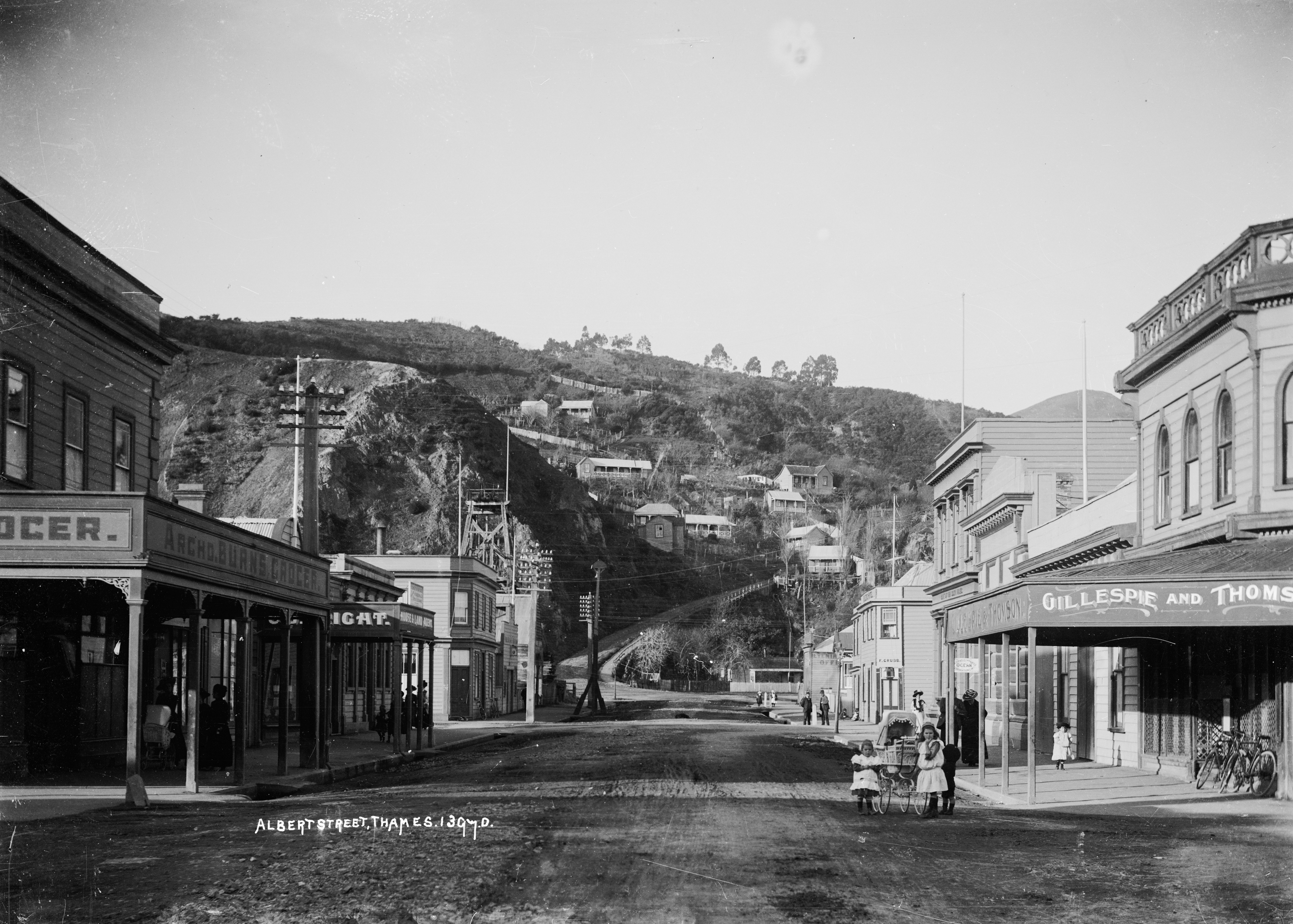
View of Albert Street in Thames, with Burns's grocery store on the left

Burns was born in Auckland, New Zealand, in 1867, to parents who had "arrived in the sixties". He started his own family by married Sophia McLaren in Melbourne in 1893. They'd go on to have four children: three daughters and a son. He moved to Thames, where he had a grocery store on Albert Street in the early 1900s.

He was a member of the Thames Borough Council for many years, and was Mayor of Thames from 1905 to 1909. During his mayoralty, he became a justice of the peace. He was chairman of the Thames Hospital Trustees, a member of the Thames Hospital Board, a member of the Thames Harbour Board, and a board member of Thames High School. For 15 years, he was responsible for fire prevention in Thames.

== Auckland ==
Afterwards, he was very involved with education issues in Auckland. He was chairman of the Auckland Education Board, a board member of Auckland Grammar School, and chairman of the board of advisers to the Auckland Teachers' Training College. He held membership of the Auckland University College Council and was a member of the Council of Education. He was a grand officer of the New Zealand Freemasons.

On 22 June 1934, he was one of fourteen members appointed by the United–Reform coalition Government to the Legislative Council. He served one seven-year term until 21 June 1941. He retained his membership of the Auckland Education Board during and after his membership of the Legislative Council.

He died on 22 December 1950.
