= List of high commissioners of New Zealand to Canada =

The high commissioner of New Zealand to Canada is New Zealand's foremost diplomatic representative in Canada, and in charge of New Zealand's diplomatic mission in Canada.

The high commission is located in Ottawa, Ontario, Canada's capital city. New Zealand has maintained a resident high commissioner in Canada since 1942. It holds non-resident accreditation to the nation of Jamaica. Until 2014 the high commissioner to Canada also held accreditation to: Barbados, Guyana, and Trinidad and Tobago. At that time a post was established in Bridgetown, Barbados with non-resident accreditation to many other isles in the Caribbean transferred.

As fellow members of the Commonwealth of Nations, diplomatic relations between New Zealand and Canada are at governmental level, rather than between heads of state. Thus, the countries exchange high commissioners, rather than ambassadors.

== List of heads of mission ==
=== High commissioners to Canada ===
- Frank Langstone (1942)
- Robert M. Firth (1942–1944)
- David Wilson (1944–1947)
- Jim Thorn (1947–1950)
- Thomas Hislop (1950–1957)
- Tom Davin (1957–1958)
- Foss Shanahan (1958–1961)
- John S. Reid (1961–1965)
- Sir Leon Götz (1965–1968)
- Dean Eyre (1968–1973)
- Jack Shepherd (1973–1976)
- Dean Eyre (1976–1980)
- Ed Latter (1980–1985)
- John Wybrow (1985–1988)
- Bruce Brown (1988–1992)
- Judith Trotter (1992–1994)
- Maurice McTigue (1994–1997)
- Jim Gerard (1997–2000)
- Wade Armstrong (2000–2003)
- Graham Kelly (2003–2006)
- Kate Lackey (2006–2010)
- Andrew Needs (2010–2013)
- Simon Tucker (2013–2016)
- Daniel Mellsop (2016–2020)
- Martin Harvey (2020–2023)
- Wendy Harvey (2026–present)
