= Ohinemuri (electorate) =

Ohinemuri is a former New Zealand parliamentary electorate. It existed from 1896 to 1928, and was represented by five Members of Parliament.

== Population centres ==
In the 1896 electoral redistribution, rapid population growth in the North Island required the transfer of three seats from the South Island to the north. Four electorates that previously existed were re-established, and three electorates were established for the first time, including Ohinemuri. The electorate was first used in the 1896 election. The original area included the settlements of Paeroa, Waihi, and Te Aroha.

In the 1902 electoral redistribution, Waihi was lost to the Bay of Plenty electorate. In the 1907 electoral redistribution, Waihi came back to the Ohinemuri electorate, but Te Aroha was lost to the Tauranga electorate. Ohinemuri was abolished in the 1927 electoral redistribution, and its area went to the Thames and Waikato electorates.

== History ==
Alfred Cadman was the electorate's first representative. He had represented the area in Parliament since the 1881 election. Cadman retired from the Lower House for appointment to the New Zealand Legislative Council at the end of the parliamentary term in 1899.

At the 1899 election, Jackson Palmer defeated Edward Moss for the Ohinemuri electorate. Palmer had previously represented the Waitemata electorate north of Auckland. At the 1902 election, Moss in turn defeated Palmer. Moss was an independent Liberal who bitterly opposed Premier Richard Seddon. At the 1905 election, Moss was defeated by Hugh Poland of the Liberal Party. Poland became an independent in 1919, and was defeated in the 1925 election by Albert Samuel.

When the electorate was abolished in 1928, Samuel transferred to the Thames electorate.

=== Members of Parliament ===
Key

Liberal Independent Liberal Reform

Election	Winner
1896 election	Alfred Cadman
1899 election	Jackson Palmer
1902 election	Edward Moss
1905 election	Hugh Poland
1908 election	Hugh Poland
1911 election	Hugh Poland
1914 election	Hugh Poland
1919 election	Hugh Poland
1922 election	Hugh Poland
1925 election	Albert Samuel
(Electorate abolished 1928; see Thames and Waikato)

== Election results ==
=== 1911 election ===
1911 general election: Ohinemuri, first ballot
Party	Candidate	Votes	%	±%
Liberal	Hugh Poland	2,791	45.57	
Socialist	Pat Hickey	1,674	27.33	
Reform	Nisbet McRobie	1,547	25.26	
Independent	Charles Fletcher	48	0.78	
Informal votes		64	1.04	
Majority		127	2.07	
Turnout		6,124	82.61	
Registered electors		7,413		

1911 general election: Ohinemuri, second ballot
Party	Candidate	Votes	%	±%
Liberal	Hugh Poland	3,341	60.60	+15.03
Socialist	Pat Hickey	2,134	38.70	+11.37
Informal votes		38	0.68	+0.10
Majority		1,207	21.89	
Turnout		5,513	71.67	−10.94
Registered electors		7,413		

=== 1908 election ===
1908 general election: Ohinemuri, first ballot
Party	Candidate	Votes	%	±%
Liberal	Hugh Poland	2,078	38.03	
Conservative	Frederick Haselden	1,252	22.91	
Socialist	Robert Frederick Way	725	13.27	
Independent	J Foster	268	4.90	
Independent Labour	Tim Armstrong	256	4.68	
Turnout		5,463	78.08	
Registered electors		6,932		

1908 general election: Ohinemuri, second ballot
Party	Candidate	Votes	%	±%
Liberal	Hugh Poland	2,884	56.68	+18.65
Conservative	Frederick Haselden	2,192	43.08	+20.17
Majority		692	13.60	
Turnout		5,088	73.39	−4.69
Registered electors		6,932		

=== 1899 election ===
1899 general election: Ohinemuri (Note: The party affiliations shown in this table are uncertain as further discussed on the talk page.)
Party	Candidate	Votes	%	±%
Independent Liberal	Jackson Palmer	1,765	31.94	
Independent Liberal	Edward Moss	1,470	26.60	
Conservative	William McCullough	795	14.39	
Liberal	Mervyn James Stewart	762	13.79	
Conservative	William Deeble	524	9.48	
Liberal	Leo De Bakker	206	3.73	
Independent Labour	Edward James Drumm (Note: Labour candidates at the time were counted as part of the Liberal Party)	4	0.07	
Majority		295	5.34	
Turnout		5,526	70.19	
Registered electors		7,873		

Table footnotes:
