= Thomas Thompson (New Zealand politician) =

New Zealand politician

The Honourable Thomas Thompson
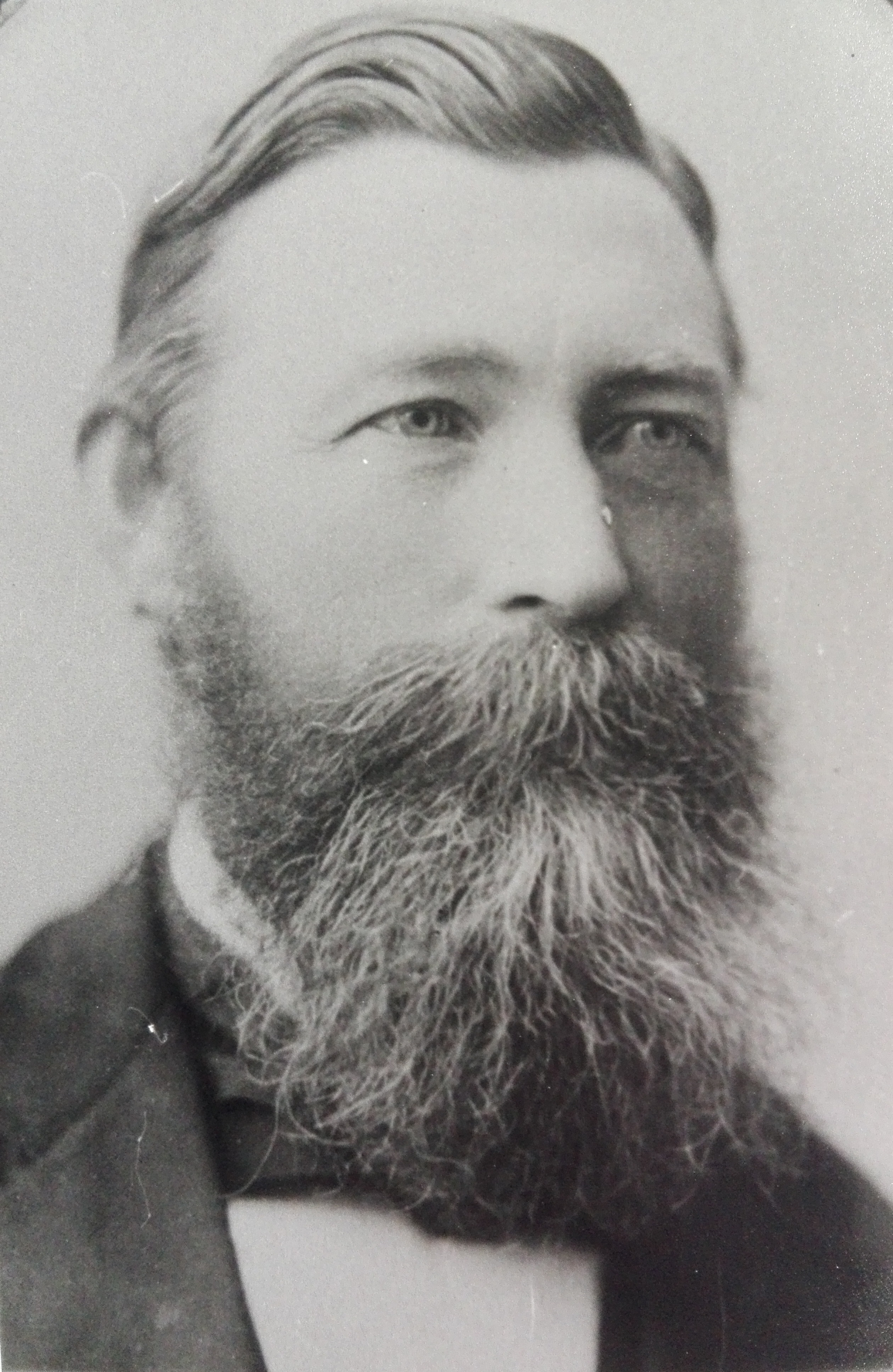

15th Minister of Justice
- In office 2 March 1896 – 23 January 1900
- Preceded by: William Hall-Jones
- Succeeded by: James McGowan

Personal details
- Born: 1832 Ireland
- Died: 21 January 1919 (aged 86–87) New Zealand
- Party: Liberal Party

Thomas Thompson (1832 – 21 January 1919) was a New Zealand politician of the Liberal Party.

== Biography ==
=== Early life and career ===
Thompson was born in Ireland in 1832 where he was entered the grocery trade as a merchant. In 1853 he shifted to Australia during the gold rush in Victoria. Then he moved to Auckland in the 1860s and carried on a grocery business there.

During the New Zealand Wars Thompson saw service with the volunteers in 1863. He received a commission as a lieutenant in 1867.

In local matters Thompson served as a member of the Road Board, Domain Board and School Committee of Mount Eden. In 1878 he was elected a member of Auckland City Council, retaining his seat until 1884, also representing the Council on the Auckland Harbour Board.

=== Member of Parliament ===
New Zealand Parliament
Years	Term	Electorate	Party
1884–1887	9th	Auckland North	Independent
1887–1890	10th	Auckland North	Independent
1890–1893	11th	City of Auckland	Liberal
1895–1896	12th	City of Auckland	Liberal
1896–1899	13th	City of Auckland	Liberal

He represented the Auckland North electorate from 1884 to 1890, then the City of Auckland electorate from 1890 to 1899, when he retired.

He was Minister of Justice from 2 March 1896 to 23 January 1900 and Minister of Defence from 22 June 1896 to 23 January 1900 in the Liberal Government.

He was appointed to the Legislative Council on 18 March 1903 and his appointment was renewed on 18 March 1910; his term ended on 17 March 1917.

=== Later life and death ===
Thompson died in Mount Eden, Auckland, on 21 January 1919, and was buried at Purewa Cemetery.

== Notes ==
Political offices
Preceded by William Hall-Jones	Minister of Justice; 1896–1900	Succeeded by James McGowan
New ministerial post	Minister of Police; 1896–1900	Succeeded by James McGowan
