= Mayor of Thames =

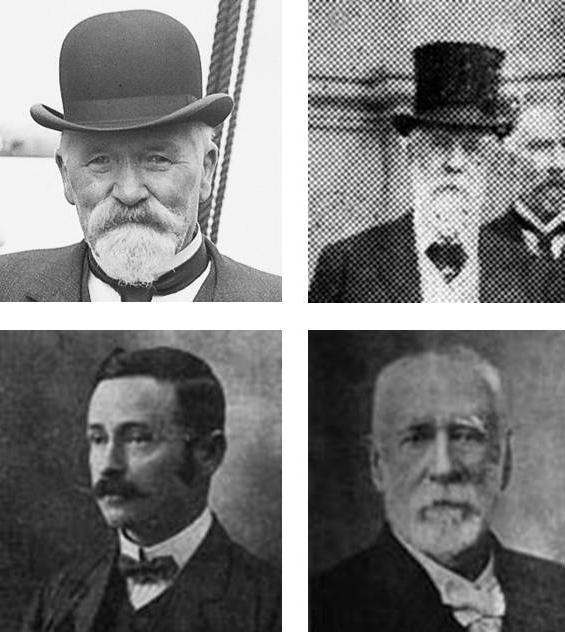
Clockwise from top left: James McGowan (10th), Colonel William Fraser (7th), William McCullough (4th), and Henry Greenslade (15th)

The Mayor of Thames officiated over the Thames Borough of New Zealand, which was administered by the Thames Borough Council. The office existed from 1874 until 1975, when Thames Borough and Coromandel County were amalgamated to form Thames-Coromandel District. There were 24 holders of the office.

== History ==
The Thames Gold Rush in the late 1860s and the early 1870s made Thames known as a locality, and the township developed from diggers settling in the area. The area was controlled by the Auckland Provincial Council. In late 1871, a public meeting in Grahamstown (one of the two historic towns that now forms Thames) resolved:

That in the opinion of the meeting it is desirable that a Municipal Corporation should be established for the Thames.

This resulted in the forming of a Thames Municipality Committee in early 1872. The Borough of Thames was gazetted in November 1873. The first Borough Council was elected in March 1874. As was practice at the time, the councillors voted one of themselves to be the mayor. William Davies was the only person proposed and voted into the role unanimously in April 1874.

After having served as mayor for a year, James McAndrew was re-elected unopposed in 1890.

Henry Greenslade resigned from the mayoralty on 31 May 1900, as he had bought a farm in Ōhaupō. Francis Trembath succeeded him and was elected unopposed.

In total, there were 24 Mayors of Thames Borough. The last mayor was Wallace (Wally) Brunton, who served from 1959 until 1975. In 1975, Thames Borough amalgamated with Coromandel County, out of which Thames-Coromandel District arose. Hence, the role was succeeded by that of the Mayor of Thames-Coromandel.

Four mayors were also represented in Parliament:

- James McGowan
- William Fraser
- Henry Greenslade
- Thomas William Rhodes

McGowan was later appointed to the New Zealand Legislative Council. William McCullough was also an MLC.

== List of mayors of Thames ==
Mayors of Thames were:

	Name	Term
1	William Davies	1874–1875
2	J.E. MacDonald	1875–1876
3	James Kilgour	1877–1878
4	William McCullough	1878–1879
5	Louis Ehrenfried	1879–1880
6	William Wilkinson	1880–1882
7	William Fraser	1882–1887
8	Alexander Brodie	1887–1888
9	William Carpenter	1888–1889
10	James McGowan	1889
11	James McAndrew	1889–1891
12	James Renshaw	1891–1892
	James McGowan (second period)	1892–1893
13	Thomas Radford	1893–1897
14	William Scott	1897–1898
15	Henry Greenslade	1898–1900
16	Francis Trembath	1900–1905
17	Archibald Burns	1905–1909
18	Frank Henry Claxton	1909–1910
19	Henry Lowe	1910–1919
20	Ernest Napier Miller	1919–1923
21	Thomas William Rhodes	1923–1927
22	William Bongard	1927–1931
23	Sidney Ensor	1931–1959
24	Wallace Brunton	1959–1975
