= Alfred Cadman =

New Zealand politician (1847–1905)

The Honourable Sir Alfred Cadman KCMG
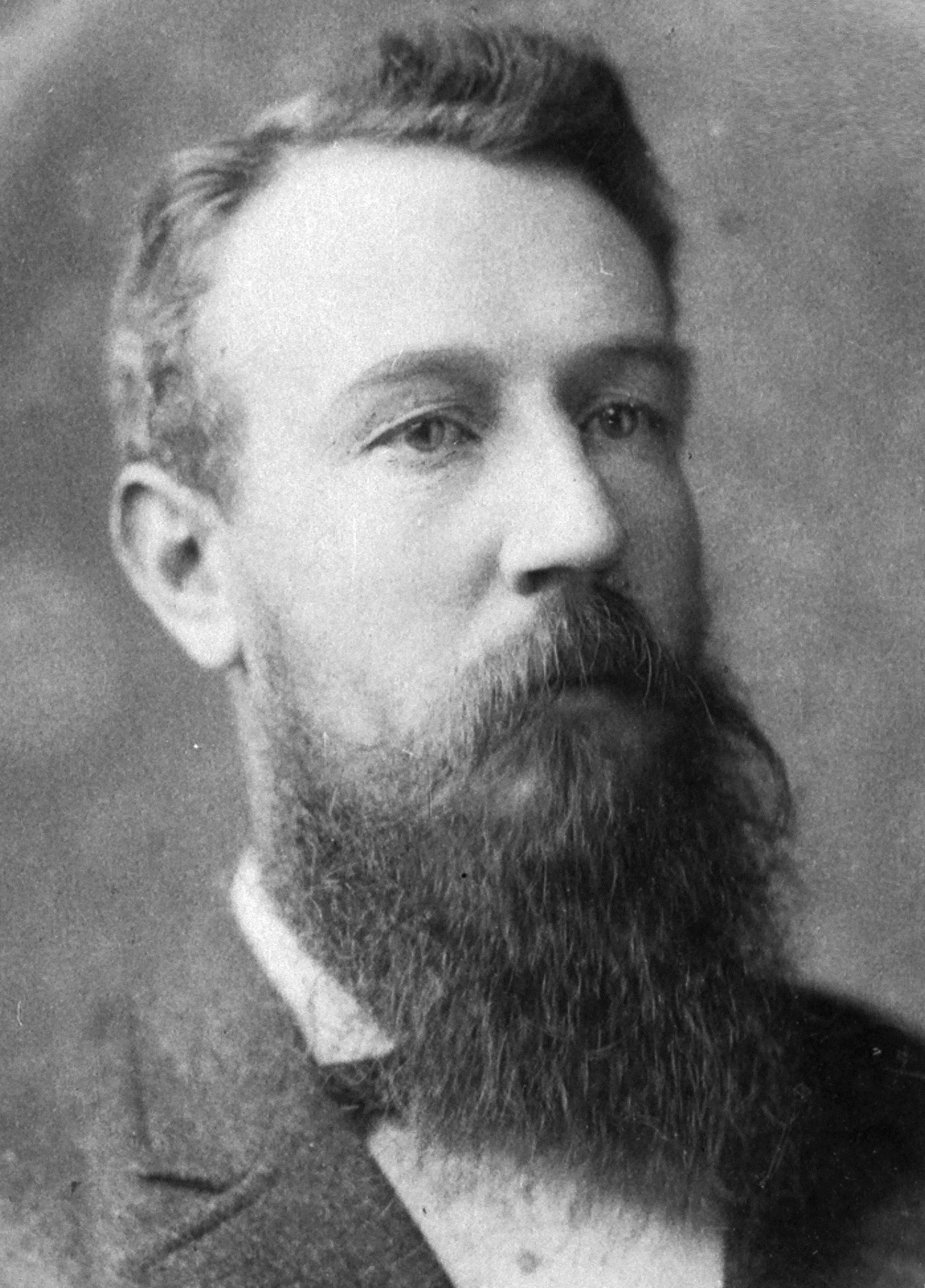
- Cadman c. 1880s

11th Speaker of the Legislative Council
- In office 7 July 1904 – 23 March 1905
- Preceded by: John Rigg
- Succeeded by: Richard Reeves

1st Minister of Railways
- In office 24 November 1895 – 28 April 1899
- Prime Minister: Richard Seddon
- Succeeded by: Joseph Ward

Member of the New Zealand Parliament for Coromandel
- In office 1881–1890

Member of the New Zealand Parliament for Thames
- In office 1890–1893

Member of the New Zealand Parliament for City of Auckland
- In office 1893–1893

Member of the New Zealand Parliament for Waikato
- In office 1893–1896

Member of the New Zealand Parliament for Ohinemuri
- In office 1896–1899

Personal details
- Born: Alfred Jerome Cadman; 17 June 1847 Sydney, New South Wales, Australia
- Died: 23 March 1905 (aged 57) Auckland, New Zealand
- Party: Liberal Party

Sir Alfred Jerome Cadman KCMG (17 June 1847 – 23 March 1905) was a New Zealand politician of the Liberal Party. He was the Minister of Railways from 1895 to 1899 in the Liberal Government.

== Early life ==
Cadman was born in Sydney, Australia, in 1847. His family emigrated to Auckland in 1848.

== Political career ==
New Zealand Parliament
Years	Term	Electorate	Party
1881–1884	8th	Coromandel	Independent
1884–1887	9th	Coromandel	Independent
1887–1890	10th	Coromandel	Independent
1890–1893	11th	Thames	Liberal
1893	11th	City of Auckland	Liberal
1893–1896	12th	Waikato	Liberal
1896–1899	13th	Ohinemuri	Liberal

Cadman was first elected to Parliament as a Greyite in 1881, supporting Sir George Grey. He represented several electorates: Coromandel 1881–1890, Thames 1890–1893 (resigned), City of Auckland 1893, Waikato 1893–1896 and Ohinemuri 1896–1899, when he retired from the Lower House. He resigned and was re-elected in the 1893 by-election after a challenge to his personal integrity.

In 1899 he was then appointed to the Legislative Council, of which he was a member from 21 December 1899 until he died, and was Speaker from 7 July 1904 until he died.

He was appointed a Companion of the Order of St Michael and St George (CMG) in June 1901, on the occasion of the visit of TRH the Duke and Duchess of Cornwall and York (later King George V and Queen Mary) to New Zealand. In 1903 he was knighted and promoted to a Knight Commander within the Order of St Michael and St George (KCMG).

== Death ==
Cadman died in Auckland on 23 March 1905.

New Zealand Parliament
New constituency	Member of Parliament for Coromandel; 1881–1890	In abeyance Title next held by Leo Schultz
Preceded by William Fraser	Member of Parliament for Thames; 1890–1893	Succeeded by James McGowan
Preceded by William Lee Rees	Member of Parliament for City of Auckland; 1893; Served alongside: John Shera, Thomas Thompson	Succeeded by Charles Button, William Crowther, George Grey
Preceded by Edward Lake	Member of Parliament for Waikato; 1893–96	Succeeded by Frederic Lang
New constituency	Member of Parliament for Ohinemuri; 1896–1899	Succeeded by Jackson Palmer
Political offices
Preceded by William Pember Reeves	Minister of Justice; 1892–1893 1893–1895	Succeeded by William Pember Reeves
Preceded by William Pember Reeves	Minister of Justice; 1892–1893 1893–1895	Succeeded by William Pember Reeves
New title	Minister of Railways; 1895–1899	Succeeded by Joseph Ward
Preceded by John Rigg	Speaker of the New Zealand Legislative Council; 1904–1905	Succeeded by Richard Reeves
