= 1878 Parnell by-election =

New Zealand by-election

The 1878 Parnell by-election was a by-election held on 20 February 1878 in the Parnell electorate during the 6th New Zealand Parliament.

The by-election was caused by the resignation of the incumbent MP Reader Wood on 21 January 1878, to go to England.

The by-election was won by Reader Wood, who had held the seat from 1861 to 1865.

As no other candidates were nominated, he was declared duly elected.
