= James McGowan (politician) =

New Zealand politician

The Honourable James McGowan
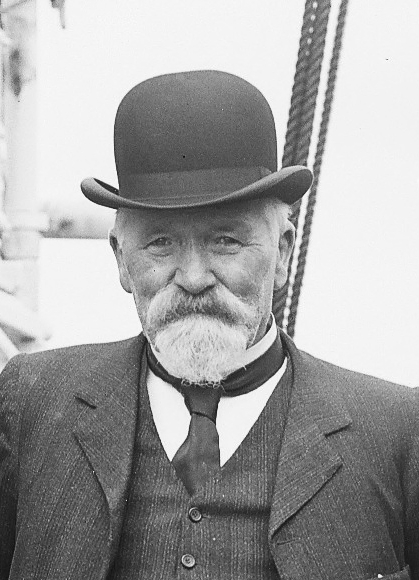
- James McGowan in 1908

16th Minister of Justice
- In office 23 January 1900 – 6 January 1909
- Prime Minister: Richard Seddon; William Hall-Jones; Joseph Ward
- Preceded by: Thomas Thompson
- Succeeded by: John Findlay

2nd Minister of Police
- In office 23 January 1900 – 6 January 1909
- Prime Minister: Richard Seddon; William Hall-Jones; Joseph Ward
- Preceded by: Thomas Thompson
- Succeeded by: John Findlay

3rd Minister of Industries and Commerce
- In office 23 November 1906 – 6 January 1909
- Prime Minister: Joseph Ward
- Preceded by: Joseph Ward
- Succeeded by: Thomas Mackenzie

18th Minister of Immigration
- In office 6 August 1906 – 9 January 1909
- Prime Minister: Joseph Ward
- Preceded by: Charles H. Mills
- Succeeded by: George Fowlds

9th Minister of Mines
- In office 21 December 1899 – 6 January 1909
- Prime Minister: Richard Seddon; William Hall-Jones; Joseph Ward
- Preceded by: Alfred Cadman
- Succeeded by: Roderick McKenzie

New Zealand Legislative Councillor
- In office 6 January 1909 – 7 May 1912
- Nominated by: Joseph Ward
- Appointed by: The Lord Plunket

Member of the New Zealand Parliament for Thames
- In office 26 July 1893 – 6 January 1909
- Preceded by: Alfred Cadman
- Succeeded by: Edmund Taylor

Personal details
- Born: 1841 Maxwell's Court, County Down, Ireland
- Died: 7 May 1912 (aged 70–71)
- Party: Liberal Party

James McGowan (1841 – 7 May 1912) was a New Zealand politician of the Liberal Party.

== Biography ==
McGowan was born in Maxwell's Court, County Down, Ireland, in 1841. He emigrated to Auckland in 1865 on the ship Liverpool. After five years, he moved to Thames, where he had a large store and a bakery.

== Political career ==
New Zealand Parliament
Years	Term	Electorate	Party
1893	11th	Thames	Liberal
1893–1896	12th	Thames	Liberal
1896–1899	13th	Thames	Liberal
1899–1902	14th	Thames	Liberal
1902–1905	15th	Thames	Liberal
1905–1908	16th	Thames	Liberal
1908–1909	17th	Thames	Liberal

He was Mayor of Thames in 1889, and in 1892–1893.

He represented the Thames electorate in Parliament from an 1893 by-election. The by-election was caused after the resignation of Liberal Party MP Alfred Cadman. The Liberals selected the incumbent Mayor of Thames, James McGowan as their candidate for Cadman's seat. After a large public gathering, it was decided not to run another candidate against McGowan in light of a general election being only months away, resulting in McGowan being elected unopposed.

From 1896 until 1900 he was the Liberal Party's junior whip.

He was Minister of Justice and Minister of Mines from 23 January 1900 in the Liberal Government. From 6 August 1906, he was Minister of Immigration. From 23 November 1906, he was Minister of Industries and Commerce. He held all ministerial posts until his resignation from the lower house.

He resigned on 6 January 1909 so that he could be appointed to the Legislative Council on that same day, where he served until his death.

== Notes ==
Political offices
Preceded by Thomas Thompson	Minister of Justice; 1900–1909	Succeeded by John Findlay
Preceded by Thomas Thompson	Minister of Police; 1900–1909	Succeeded by John Findlay
New Zealand Parliament
Preceded by Alfred Cadman	Member of Parliament for Thames; 1893–1909	Succeeded by Edmund Taylor
