= Hugh Poland (politician) =

New Zealand politician (1868–1938)

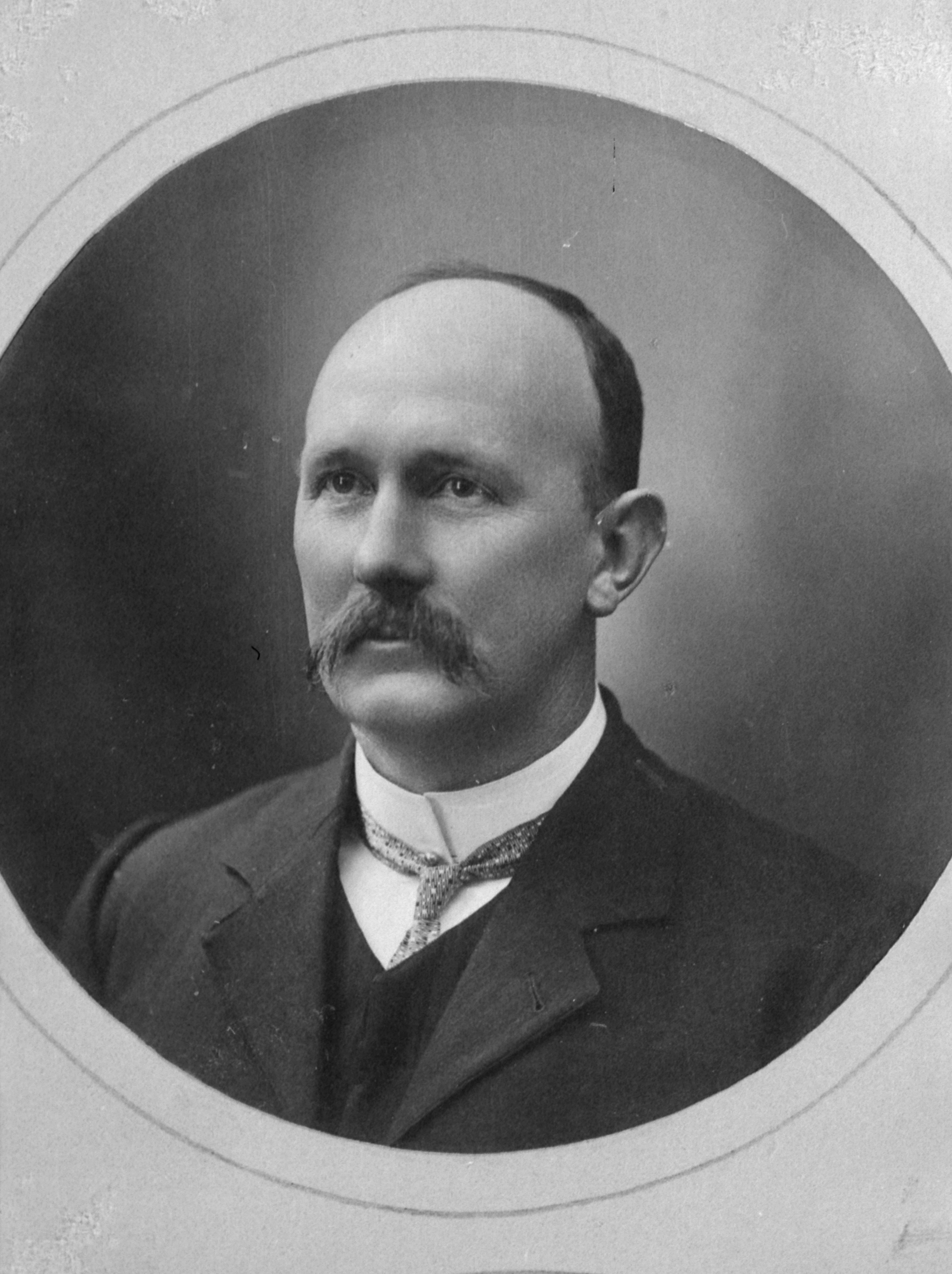
- Poland in the 1920s

Member of Parliament for Ohinemuri
- In office 6 December 1905 – 14 October 1925
- Preceded by: Edward Moss
- Succeeded by: Albert Samuel

Personal details
- Born: 1868 Tuakau, Franklin District, New Zealand
- Died: 3 January 1938 (aged 69–70) Paeroa, New Zealand
- Party: Liberal Party
- Other political affiliations: Independent Liberal
- Spouse(s): Mary Ellen Poland (née Hand, m. 1892)
- Occupation: storekeeper
- Profession: teacher

Hugh Poland (1868 – 3 January 1938) was a member of parliament for the Ohinemuri electorate in New Zealand.

== Early life ==
Poland was born in Tuakau, the son of John and Teresa Poland. All sources give his year of birth as 1868, but the birth certificated held by the Department of Internal Affairs is dated 29 June 1867. He received his education at Tuakau School and at Auckland Grammar School. In his youth, he was a prominent athlete, and he represented Auckland in rugby from 1887 to 1891, and in 1894. After school, he was initially a teacher for two years, worked as a flaxmiller in Helensville, and then had stores in Rotorua and Paeroa; he remained in the latter place for the rest of his life.

== Political career ==
New Zealand Parliament
Years	Term	Electorate	Party
1905–1908	16th	Ohinemuri	Liberal
1908–1911	17th	Ohinemuri	Liberal
1911–1914	18th	Ohinemuri	Liberal
1914–1919	19th	Ohinemuri	Liberal
1919–1922	20th	Ohinemuri	Independent Liberal
1922–1925	21st	Ohinemuri	Independent Liberal

=== Local body career ===
Poland first stood for election to the Ohinemuri County Council in November 1899. He was the highest-polling candidate in his riding and was thus declared elected. He served on the county council until 1908, and was chairman from 1901 to 1905, and was on the Licensing Committee and Education Committee.

=== Member of Parliament ===
Hugh Poland represented the Ohinemuri electorate in the New Zealand House of Representatives for twenty years from 1905 to 1925. Poland was a Liberal until the 1919 election when he stood as an independent and was successful. Whilst not a member of the Labour Party, he was regarded by his voters as a "miners' advocate" and his lobbying contributed to the establishment of the phthisis pension.

In 1935, he was awarded the King George V Silver Jubilee Medal.

== Community involvement ==
Poland was secretary of the Ohinemuri Jockey Club for over three decades. He gifted the Poland Memorial Cup for Thames Valley rugby union, and was an officer for the local rugby union for many years.

== Family and death ==
On 10 August 1892, Poland married Mary Ellen Hand, the daughter of James Hand of Helensville. One of their sons, Hugh Francis "Frank" Poland, was killed in the Battle of Passchendaele during World War I. Hugh Poland died on 3 January 1938 at Paeroa, survived by his wife, seven sons, and four daughters. His funeral service was held by James Liston, the Roman Catholic bishop of Auckland. He is buried at Pukerimu Lawn Cemetery, also known as Paeroa Cemetery.

Poland built his house in Paeroa in 1899. The street was later named Poland Street in his honour. The house still stands and operates as a bed and breakfast.

== Notes ==
New Zealand Parliament
Preceded by Edward Moss	Member of Parliament for Ohinemuri; 1905–1925	Succeeded by Albert Samuel
