= 1936 New Zealand National Party leadership election =

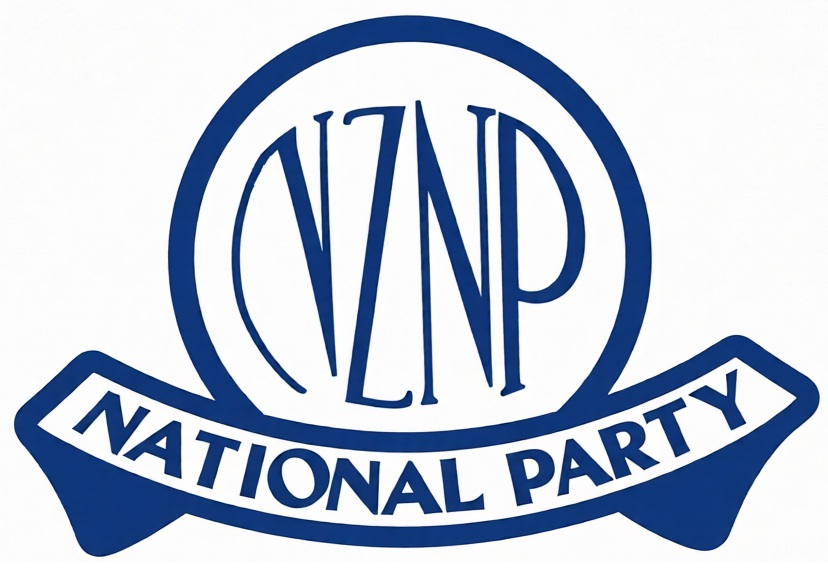
- 31 October 1936
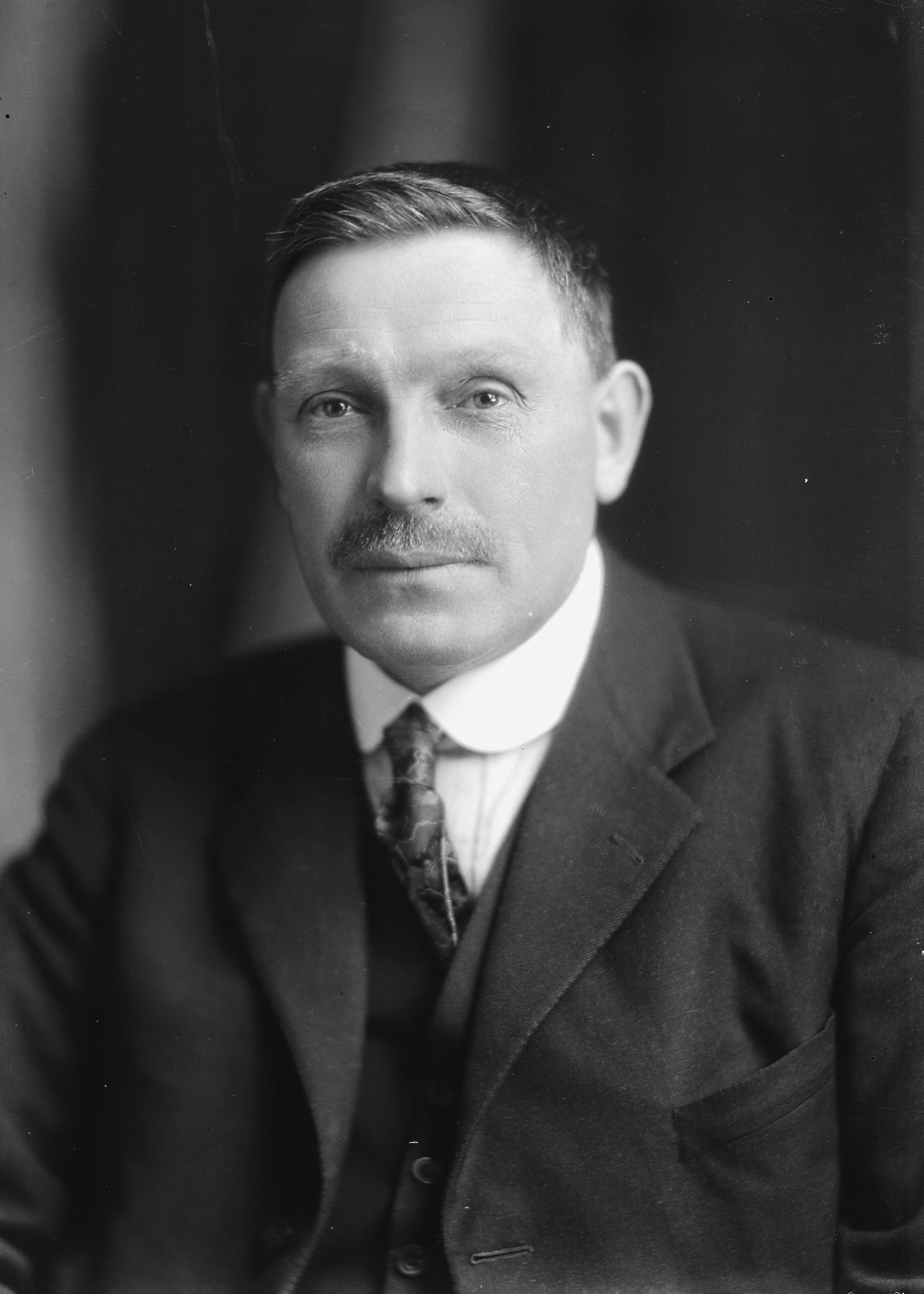

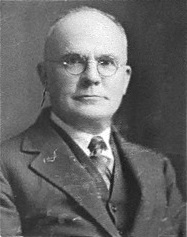
Candidate	Adam Hamilton	Charles Wilkinson
Popular vote	13	12
Percentage	52.00%	48.00%
Leader before election
George Forbes
Leader after election
Adam Hamilton

The New Zealand National Party leadership election was held in 1936 to select a new leader of the newly founded New Zealand National Party. The election was narrowly won by Wallace MP Adam Hamilton.

== Background ==
The National Party was formed in May 1936 by the defeated remnants of the Reform and United parties. These two parties had formed a coalition government from 1931. From May 1935 the two extra-parliamentary organisations and their associated parliamentary parties had worked together as one political organisation calling themselves the National Political Federation with the joint parliamentary party forming the then government and being called the National Party from that time.

After the defeat of the National Political Federation at the November 1935 general election, on 4 December 1935, two days prior to stepping down as Prime Minister, the then parliamentary leader George Forbes was elected by the parliamentary National Party as leader and on 6 December 1935 he became the Leader of the Opposition. Forbes carried on as leader of the parliamentary National Party during the transition in May 1936 of its members from the National Political Federation to the New Zealand National Party and by prior agreement he retired from the leadership role on 31 October 1936.

Over the issue of leadership the two parties leaders Gordon Coates and George Forbes were known to have a testing relationship, and neither would serve under the other's leadership threatening to divide the budding party. This led to alternative figures to be turned to in order to find a new leader, however Coates (who was reluctant about the new Party to begin with) was determined that the leader should be a Reform MP.

== Candidates ==
=== Adam Hamilton ===
First elected in 1919, Hamilton had served as the Minister of Internal Affairs and Postmaster-General in the United-Reform Coalition government which governed during the Great Depression. In what some called an act of blackmail, led by Coates, a group of Reform MPs, including Hamilton, went as far as to threaten to leave the new National Party and re-establish the old Reform Party unless Hamilton was chosen as leader in succession to Forbes.

=== Charles Wilkinson ===
Wilkinson was the MP for Egmont from a 1912 by-election to 1919 when he retired before returning in 1928. It was well known that Forbes was known to prefer Wilkinson, having invited him to join as a member of the New Zealand National Party and its associated parliamentary party in mid-1936, and was of the opinion that as a new party National should have a new leader free from association of the coalition government of which Wilkinson was not a member.

== Result ==
The election was conducted through a members' ballot by National's parliamentary caucus. The following table gives the ballot results:

Name	Votes	Percentage
Adam Hamilton	13	52.00%
Charles Wilkinson	12	48.00%

== Aftermath ==
Hamilton was essentially chosen as a compromise candidate and succeeded to the leadership in controversial circumstance, leading just days later to the resignation of the President of the New Zealand National Party, Sir George Wilson. Whilst honest, dependable and experienced, he lacked the charisma needed for leadership and was too closely linked with the government during the depression by the public. He was never able to properly establish himself as leader, being seen by many as a mere lieutenant of Coates, his former leader. Wilkinson remained an MP until he retired in 1943.
