= Electoral history of Thomas Wilford =

List of elections featuring Thomas Wilford as a candidate

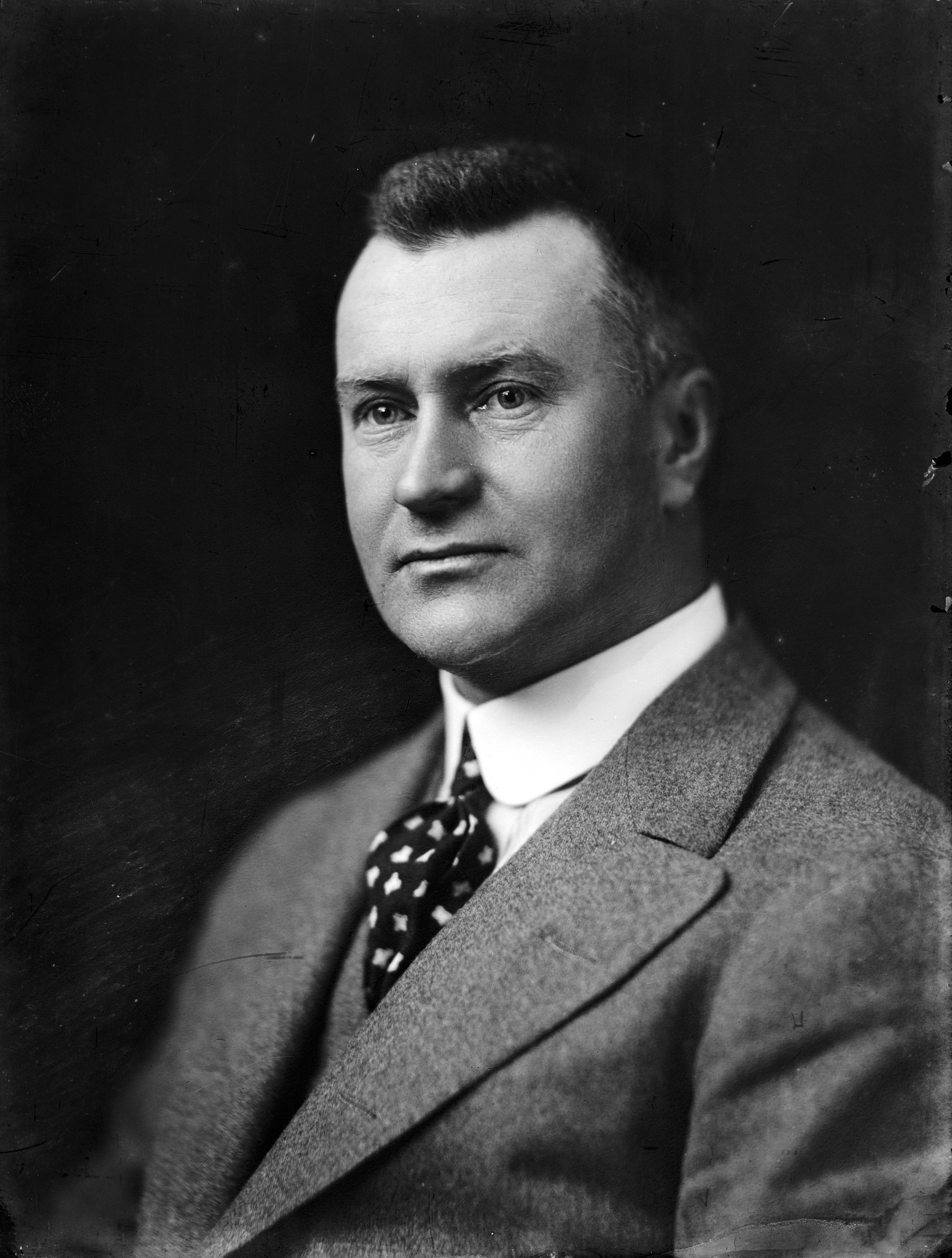
Thomas Wilford in the 1910s.

This is a summary of the electoral history of Sir Thomas Wilford, Mayor of Wellington (1910–11), Leader of the Liberal Party (1920–25) and Member of Parliament for Wellington Suburbs (1896–97, 1899-1902), then Hutt (1902–29).

== Parliamentary elections ==
=== 1893 election ===
1893 general election: Suburbs of Wellington
Party	Candidate	Votes	%	±%
Conservative	Alfred Newman	1,839	51.74	
Liberal	Thomas Wilford	1,715	48.25	
Majority		124	3.48	
Turnout		3,554	78.21	
Registered electors		4,544		

=== 1896 election ===
1896 general election: Suburbs of Wellington
Party	Candidate	Votes	%	±%
Liberal	Thomas Wilford	2,194	53.05	+4.80
Conservative	Thomas William Hislop	1,942	46.95	
Majority		252	6.09	
Turnout		4,136		

=== 1899 election ===
1899 general election: Suburbs of Wellington
Party	Candidate	Votes	%	±%
Liberal	Thomas Wilford	2,298	50.39	
Conservative	Alfred Newman	1,762	38.64	
Independent Liberal	Richard Clement Kirk	491	10.77	
Independent	Richard Giles Knight	9	0.20	
Majority		536	11.75	
Turnout		4,560	74.44	
Registered electors		6,126		

=== 1902 election ===
1902 general election: Hutt
Party	Candidate	Votes	%	±%
Liberal	Thomas Wilford	2,115	54.52	
Independent Liberal	Frederick Pirani	1,674	43.15	
Independent	Joseph Collier	90	2.32	
Majority		441	11.36	
Turnout		3,879	76.59	
Registered electors		5,064		

=== 1905 election ===
1905 general election: Hutt
Party	Candidate	Votes	%	±%
Liberal	Thomas Wilford	3,452	57.49	+2.97
New Liberal	George Yerex	1,540	25.64	
Independent	George London	957	15.93	
Informal votes		55	0.91	
Majority		1,912	31.84	+20.48
Turnout		6,004	82.42	+5.83
Registered electors		7,284		

=== 1908 election ===
1908 general election: Hutt, First ballot
Party	Candidate	Votes	%	±%
Liberal	Thomas Wilford	3,764	61.60	+7.08
Conservative	Richard Shortt	2,226	36.43	
Informal votes		120	1.96	+1.05
Majority		1,538	25.17	+6.67
Turnout		6,110	78.45	−3.97
Registered electors		7,788		

=== 1911 election ===
1911 general election: Hutt, First ballot
Party	Candidate	Votes	%	±%
Liberal	Thomas Wilford	3,471	50.33	−11.27
Labour	Michael Reardon	1,540	22.33	
Independent	John McEwan	911	13.21	
Reform	Richard Shortt	881	12.77	−23.66
Informal votes		93	1.34	−0.52
Majority		1,931	28.00	+2.83
Turnout		6,896	83.60	+5.15
Registered electors		8,248		

=== 1914 election ===
1914 general election: Hutt
Party	Candidate	Votes	%	±%
Liberal	Thomas Wilford	3,977	56.72	−6.39
United Labour	Albert Samuel	3,034	43.27	
Informal votes		143	2.03	+0.69
Majority		943	13.45	−14.55
Turnout		7,011	83.03	+0.57
Registered electors		8,443		

=== 1919 election ===
1919 general election: Hutt
Party	Candidate	Votes	%	±%
Liberal	Thomas Wilford	3,422	41.59	−15.13
Labour	David Pritchard	2,417	29.38	
Reform	Percy Rishworth	2,319	28.19	
Informal votes		68	0.82	−1.21
Majority		1,005	12.21	−1.24
Turnout		8,226	82.44	−0.59
Registered electors		9,983		

=== 1922 election ===
1922 general election: Hutt
Party	Candidate	Votes	%	±%
Liberal	Thomas Wilford	3,707	41.15	−0.44
Labour	David Pritchard	2,905	32.25	+2.87
Reform	Henry Bennett	2,317	25.72	
Informal votes		78	0.86	+0.04
Majority		802	8.90	−3.31
Turnout		9,007	91.21	+8.77
Registered electors		9,874		

=== 1925 election ===
1925 general election: Hutt
Party	Candidate	Votes	%	±%
Liberal	Thomas Wilford	6,080	58.13	+16.98
Labour	Walter Nash	4,286	40.98	
Informal votes		92	0.87	+0.01
Majority		1,794	17.15	+8.25
Turnout		10,458	91.04	−0.17
Registered electors		11,487		

=== 1928 election ===
1928 general election: Hutt
Party	Candidate	Votes	%	±%
United	Thomas Wilford	7,283	54.92	−3.21
Labour	Walter Nash	5,978	45.08	+4.10
Informal votes		288	2.13	+1.26
Majority		1,305	9.84	−7.31
Turnout		13,549	90.95	−0.9
Registered electors		14,898		

== Local elections ==
=== Wellington City mayoral election, 1901 ===
Wellington mayoral election, 1901
Party	Candidate	Votes	%	±%
Independent	John Aitken	5,801	67.98	
Independent	Thomas Wilford	2,732	32.02	
Majority		3,069	35.96	
Turnout		8,533		

=== Wellington City mayoral election, 1907 ===
Wellington mayoral election, 1907
Party	Candidate	Votes	%	±%
Independent	Thomas William Hislop	5,658	65.63	+34.14
Independent	Thomas Wilford	2,962	34.36	
Majority		2,696	31.27	+23.97
Turnout		8,620		

=== Wellington City mayoral election, 1909 ===
Wellington mayoral election, 1909
Party	Candidate	Votes	%	±%
Independent	Alfred Newman	4,523	33.72	
Independent	Thomas Wilford	4,240	31.61	−2.75
Independent	Francis Fisher	3,208	23.92	
Ind. Labour League	John Rigg	824	6.14	
Independent	Frederick Bolton	616	4.59	
Majority		283	2.11	
Turnout		13,411		

=== Wellington City mayoral election, 1910 ===
Wellington City mayoral election, 1910
Party	Candidate	Votes	%	±%
Independent	Thomas Wilford	6,248	54.26	+22.75
Independent	Charles John Crawford	5,267	45.74	
Majority		981	8.51	
Turnout		11,515		

=== Wellington City mayoral election, 1911 ===
Wellington mayoral election, 1911
Party	Candidate	Votes	%	±%
Citizens League	Thomas Wilford	unopposed		

== Bibliography ==
- Hislop, J. (1923). The General Election, 1922. Government Printer.
- McRobie, Alan (1989). Electoral Atlas of New Zealand. Wellington: GP Books. ISBN 0-477-01384-8.
