= Charles E. Major =

New Zealand politician

Member of the New Zealand Parliament for Hawera
- In office 25 November 1902 – 17 November 1908
- Preceded by: Felix McGuire
- Succeeded by: Constituency abolished

Personal details
- Born: 20 June 1859 St. Helier, Jersey
- Died: 1 June 1954 (aged 94) Auckland, New Zealand
- Party: Liberal
- Occupation: Land-broker and estate agent

Charles Edwin Major (20 June 1859 – 1 June 1954) was a New Zealand politician of the Liberal Party, in Taranaki.

== Biography ==
=== Early life and career ===
Major was born in 1859 at St. Helier, Jersey. Aged 13, he came to New Zealand with his parents, arriving at Wellington aboard the sailing ship Jessie Readman on 25 December 1872. He had a business career in various locations in the North Island including Wellington, Taranaki, and Poverty Bay. He was a talented athlete and played representative rugby union for Wellington, Taranaki and Poverty Bay. He was a land-broker and estate agent.

He was first elected to public office when he was 25 years old and was the Mayor of Hawera for 13 years.

=== Parliamentary career ===
New Zealand Parliament
Years	Term	Electorate	Party
1902–1905	15th	Hawera	Liberal
1905–1908	16th	Hawera	Liberal

Major was a Member of Parliament for Hawera in the 15th and 16th parliaments, from 1902 to 1908, having failed to win election in 1899. He was passionately opposed to the "evils of landlordism" and supported John McKenzie's land reforms. He was the chairman of the 'country party', a grouping in the Liberal caucus opposing single-tax and George Fowlds' land taxation policies.

At the 1908 Major was defeated when he stood in the Patea electorate. According to George Laurenson, Major (along with Walter Symes, Alfred Fraser and J. T. Marryat Hornsby) was a barrier to several of the more progressive reforms other Liberal MPs wished to see. Laurenson did not lament Major's defeat stating; "Why those men were more against progress & reform than most of Massey's crowd."

=== Later life and death ===
Major moved to Auckland and resumed his business career. He was a member of the Auckland Racing Club for many years. He contested the Manukau electorate in the 1919 general election, placing third.

Major died aged 94 at Auckland in 1954. He was survived by two daughters, one living in the United States, and an adopted daughter living in Kohimarama.

== Citations ==
New Zealand Parliament
Preceded by Felix McGuire	Member of Parliament for Hawera; 1902–1908	Constituency abolished
