= Hawera (electorate) =

Hawera was a parliamentary electorate in the South Taranaki District of New Zealand from 1896 to 1908. It was represented by two Members of Parliament over the four parliamentary terms of its existence.

== Population centres ==
In the 1896 electoral redistribution, rapid population growth in the North Island required the transfer of three seats from the South Island to the north. Four electorates that previously existed were re-established, and three electorates were established for the first time, including Hawera. The New Plymouth electorate was abolished, the Egmont electorate shifted north, and the Patea electorate shifted east. This made room for the Taranaki and Hawera electorates. Settlements in the original Hawera electorate were the towns of Hāwera, Manaia, and Eltham.

In the 1902 electoral redistribution, Eltham was lost to the Patea electorate, but Ōpunake was gained from the Taranaki electorate. In the 1907 electoral redistribution, the Hawera electorate was abolished, and its area was distributed to the Patea and Egmont electorates.

== History ==
Felix McGuire was the electorate's first representative. As an independent conservative, he had previously represented the Egmont electorate since a 1891 by-election after the resignation of Harry Atkinson. In the 1902 election, McGuire was defeated by Charles E. Major of the Liberal Party. McGuire and Major once again contested the Hawera electorate in 1905, and Major remained successful.

The Hawera electorate was abolished at the 1908 election. Major stood in the Patea electorate, but was defeated by the conservative politician George Pearce.

=== Members of Parliament ===
The Hawera electorate was represented by two Members of Parliament:

Key

Conservative Liberal

Election	Winner
1896 election	Felix McGuire
1899 election	Felix McGuire
1902 election	Charles Major
1905 election	Charles Major
(Electorate abolished 1908; see Patea and Egmont)

== Election results ==
=== 1905 election ===
1905 general election: Hawera
Party	Candidate	Votes	%	±%
Liberal	Charles E. Major	2,206	42.55	−7.69
Conservative	Felix McGuire	1,757	33.89	−15.87
Independent Liberal	Benjamin Robbins	1,222	23.57	
Informal votes		61	1.16	
Majority		449	8.66	+8.19
Turnout		5,246	84.41	+7.47
Registered electors		6,215		

=== 1902 election ===
1902 general election: Hawera
Party	Candidate	Votes	%	±%
Liberal	Charles E. Major	2,233	50.24	+8.77
Conservative	Felix McGuire	2,212	49.76	+6.93
Majority		21	0.47	
Turnout		4,445	76.94	−1.32
Registered electors		5,777		

=== 1899 election ===
1899 general election: Hawera
Party	Candidate	Votes	%	±%
Conservative	Felix McGuire	1,740	42.83	+7.89
Liberal	Charles E. Major	1,685	41.47	+10.29
Independent Liberal	David Lyon Astbury	638	15.70	
Majority		55	1.35	+0.29
Turnout		4,063	78.26	−4.16
Registered electors		5,192		

=== 1896 election ===
1896 general election: Hawera
Party	Candidate	Votes	%	±%
Conservative	Felix McGuire	1,182	34.94	
Liberal	Benjamin Robbins	1,146	33.88	
Liberal	Charles E. Major	1,055	31.19	
Majority		36	1.06	
Turnout		3,383		
Registered electors		4,105		
