= Charles Wilson (librarian) =

New Zealand librarian and politician (1857–1932)

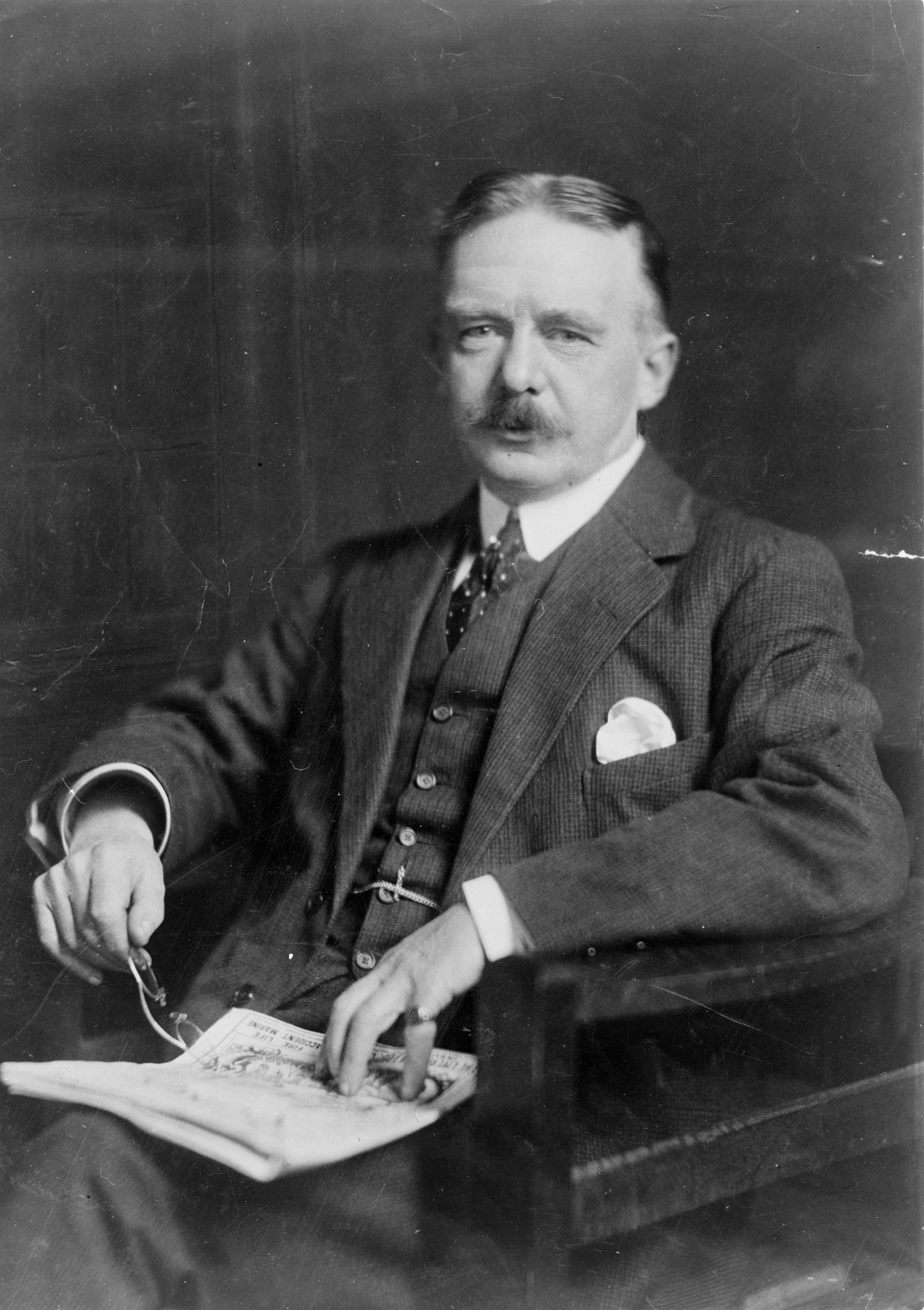
- Charles Wilson during the 1910s

Member of the New Zealand Parliament for Wellington Suburbs
- In office 23 April 1897 – 15 November 1899
- Preceded by: Thomas Wilford
- Succeeded by: Thomas Wilford

Personal details
- Born: 1 January 1857 Harrogate, Yorkshire, England
- Died: 9 February 1932 (aged 75)
- Party: Liberal Party
- Occupation: teacher, editor, politician, librarian

Charles Wilson (1 January 1857 – 9 February 1932) was a New Zealand librarian and politician of the Liberal Party. He was the first chief librarian of the General Assembly Library.

== Early life ==
Wilson was born in 1857 in Harrogate, Yorkshire, son of John Wilson, a chemist from West Park. He attended Harrogate College and whilst one online biography in addition lists the University of Oxford, other biographies suggest that as a young man, he worked in the woollen trade in Bradford before going to Paris and Lille, aged about 18.

He emigrated to New Zealand on the Otaki, which reached Port Chalmers on 24 December 1879. He stayed in Dunedin for a few months and then accepted a position as assistant master at Te Aro School in Wellington. In 1882, he joined the staff at the Wanganui Collegiate School, where he worked for three or four years.

He then had a career change and worked as a journalist. His first job was as a sub-editor at the Wanganui Chronicle in Wanganui, with subsequent employment by the Gisborne Standard in Gisborne, and the Evening News in Napier. He then founded and edited the Marton Mercury in Marton, a small settlement southeast of Wanganui. In 1892, he became editor of the New Zealand Mail, which was a newspaper with a leaning towards the Liberal Party.

On 2 June 1894, Wilson married Lucilla Naomi Carter of Pauatahanui.

== Political career ==
New Zealand Parliament
Years	Term	Electorate	Party
1897–1899	13th	Wellington Suburbs	Liberal

Wilson was one of nine candidates in the three-member Wellington electorate in the 1896 election, where he came fifth.

Thomas Wilford of the Liberal Party won the Wellington Suburbs seat in the 1896 election, but he was declared guilty of corrupt practices after an electoral petition (probably because he exceeded the £200 spending limit which had been introduced at that election) and the election was declared void.

At the subsequent by-election in 1897, Wilson won the seat for the Liberals. One of his obituaries mentions that at Wanganui Collegiate, Wilford had been Wilson's pupil, but Wilford's Dictionary of New Zealand Biography entry lists schools other than Wanganui Collegiate. Wilson retired in 1899 when the next general election was held, and Wilford won the seat back on behalf of the Liberal Party.

== Librarian ==
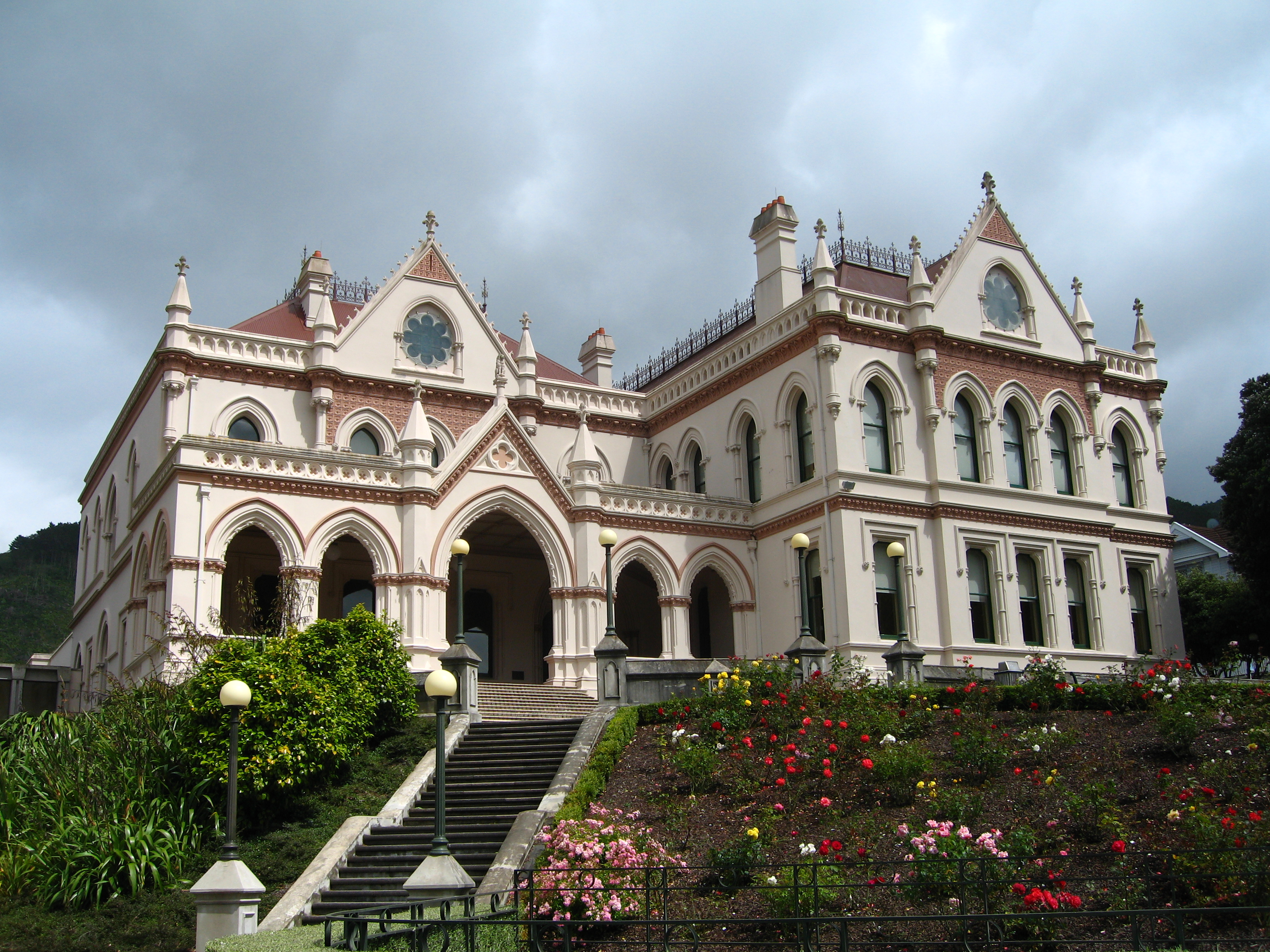
Wellington Parliamentary Library building from 1899

In 1901, Wilson was appointed the first chief librarian of the parliamentary library. This was not uncontroversial and was seen as reward by the Liberal Government for his services to the Liberal Party. One of his first tasks was to oversee the move of the library into newly constructed premises. The building was designed by Thomas Turnbull, who specialised in making buildings earthquake- and fire-proof.

Wilson was concerned about having had the library built next to the "tinder dry" Parliament Buildings. He initiated further fireproofing measures like having windows closed with bricks and having iron doors installed. His concerns proved justified, as on 11 December 1907, the Parliament Building burned down. Whilst the roof of the library was destroyed and the main entrance and foyer were damaged, the collection survived the fire.

Wilson was friends with Harold Beauchamp, and for this reason, Beauchamp's daughter Kathleen was allowed to use the parliamentary library as "a welcome retreat from ... the crass colonial life of Wellington". She was later to become famous under her pen name, Katherine Mansfield.

As a bibliophile with his own private collection, Wilson had a traditional approach to his librarianship role and concentrated on expanding the parliamentary library. In 1918 the library received the bequest to the New Zealand government from Alexander Turnbull, who had constituted the largest private library in the country consisting of "55,000 volumes of books, pamphlets, periodicals and newspapers, and thousands of maps, paintings, drawings, prints and manuscripts". The government purchased Turnbull's home to house the Turnbull collection, and put Wilson in charge of transferring the collection to the nation, and appointed him as supervisor for the further development of the collection. Wilson retired as a librarian in 1926 following an illness and was succeeded in that role by Guy Scholefield.

== Other activities ==
Wilson was a member of the Yorkshire Society, including its vice-president. He was one of the founders of the Savage Club in Wellington. Wilson was a member of the Academy of Fine Arts, and at one point was the president of the society's council. Wilson was a member of the original council of Victoria University College and its chairman for two years.

Upon his retirement as a librarian, he and his wife embarked on an eight-month trip around the world that took in France, Belgium, Holland, and Switzerland; there he attended the World's Press Union Conference in Geneva as New Zealand's representative.

=== Bibliography ===
Wilson regularly provided book reviews to newspapers, and his style of writing was described by the Auckland Star as "very pleasant, gossipy". He published several books, which were collections of book review essays:

- Wilson, Charles (1921). City of Wellington.
- Wilson, Charles (1922). Rambles in Bookland. Whitcombe & Tombs.
- Wilson, Charles (1923). New Rambles. Whitcombe & Tombs.

== Death ==
On 5 February 1932, Wilson ran to catch the Wellington Cable Car. He tripped and hit his head on a kerb, and was taken to the Bowen Street hospital. He had lost consciousness and died four days later. Wilson was buried at Karori Cemetery. He was survived by his wife, three sons, and one daughter.

== Notes ==
New Zealand Parliament
Preceded by Thomas Wilford	Member of Parliament for Wellington Suburbs; 1897–1899	Succeeded by Thomas Wilford
