= Thomas Wilford =

New Zealand politician (1870–1939)

The Honourable Sir Thomas Wilford KCMG KC
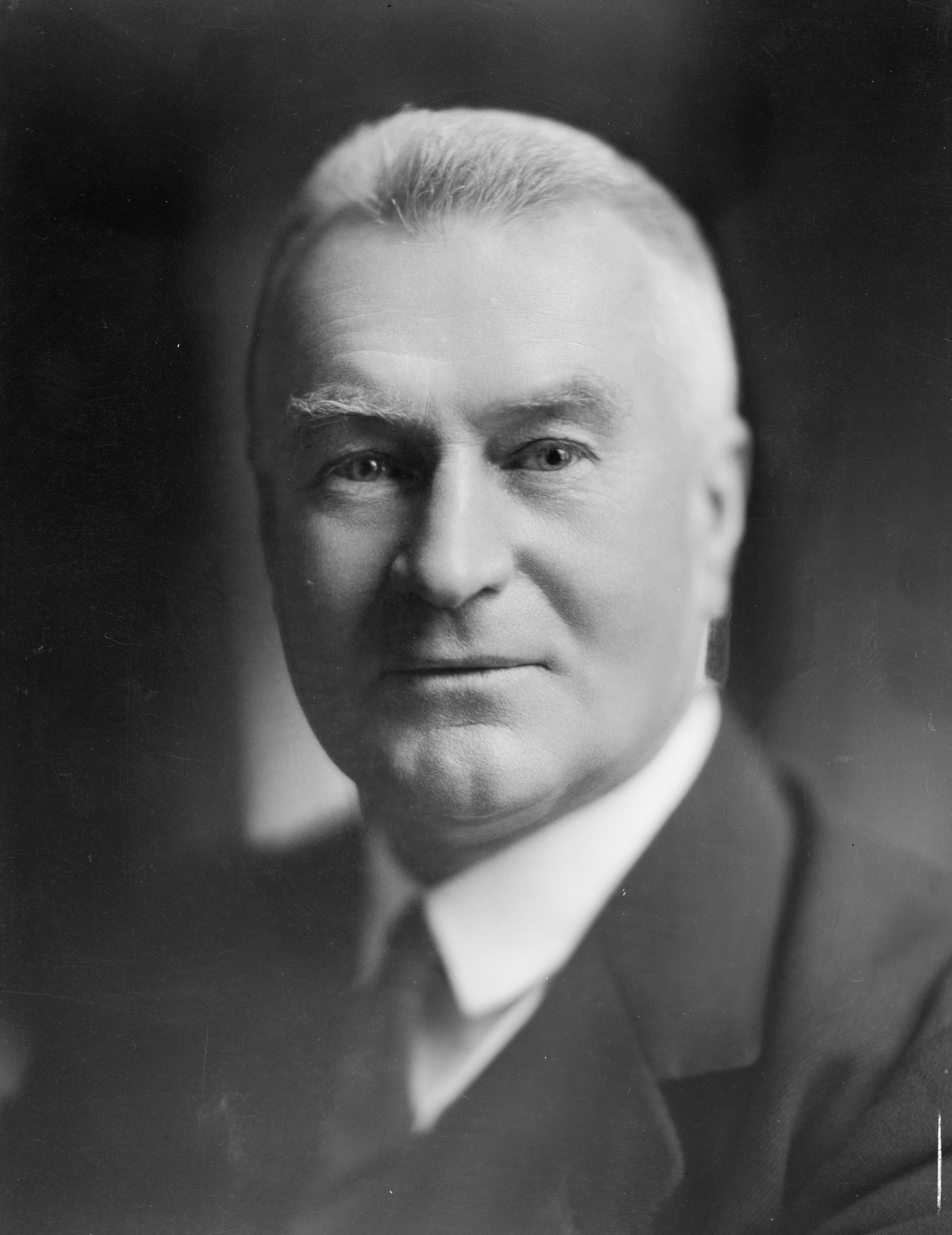
- Thomas Wilford in 1928

10th High Commissioner to the United Kingdom
- In office 9 January 1930 – 25 January 1934
- Prime Minister: Sir Joseph Ward
- Preceded by: James Parr
- Succeeded by: James Parr

17th Minister of Defence
- In office 10 December 1928 – 10 December 1929
- Prime Minister: Sir Joseph Ward
- Preceded by: William Downie Stewart Jr
- Succeeded by: John Cobbe

8th Leader of the Opposition
- In office 8 September 1920 – 13 August 1925
- Deputy: Thomas Sidey
- Preceded by: William MacDonald
- Succeeded by: George Forbes

16th Minister of Marine
- In office 14 November 1917 – 22 August 1919
- Prime Minister: William Massey
- Preceded by: William Herries
- Succeeded by: George Russell

18th Mayor of Wellington
- In office 5 May 1910 – 2 May 1912
- Deputy: John Smith
- Preceded by: Alfred Newman
- Succeeded by: David McLaren

Member of the New Zealand Parliament for Hutt
- In office 25 November 1902 – 21 November 1929
- Preceded by: New constituency
- Succeeded by: Walter Nash

Personal details
- Born: 20 June 1870 Lower Hutt, New Zealand
- Died: 22 June 1939 (aged 69) Wellington, New Zealand
- Party: Liberal
- Spouse: Georgia Constance McLean (m. 1892)
- Relations: Thomas Mason (grandfather); George McLean (father-in-law)

Sir Thomas Mason Wilford KCMG KC (20 June 1870 – 22 June 1939) was a New Zealand politician. He held the seats of Wellington Suburbs then Hutt continuously for thirty years, from 1899 to 1929. Wilford was leader of the New Zealand Liberal Party, and Leader of the Opposition from 1920 to 1925.

== Early life ==
Wilford was born in Lower Hutt in 1870. His parents were the surgeon John George Frederick Wilford and his wife, Elizabeth Catherine Mason. His grandfather on his mother's side was Thomas Mason. Wilford was a keen sportsman and athlete in his youth and competed in several sports including rugby, tennis and boxing. He obtained his education at Wellington College in the Wellington suburb of Mount Victoria, followed by Christ's College in Christchurch. He passed his examinations as a lawyer at age 18, but could not be admitted to the bar until he had reached the legal age of 21.

He married Georgia Constance McLean, daughter of George McLean, on 17 February 1892 at Dunedin. They had one son and one daughter.

== Member of Parliament ==
New Zealand Parliament
Years	Term	Electorate	Party
1896–1897	13th	Wellington Suburbs	Liberal
1899–1902	14th	Wellington Suburbs	Liberal
1902–1905	15th	Hutt	Liberal
1905–1908	16th	Hutt	Liberal
1908–1911	17th	Hutt	Liberal
1911–1914	18th	Hutt	Liberal
1914–1919	19th	Hutt	Liberal
1919–1922	20th	Hutt	Liberal
1922–1925	21st	Hutt	Liberal
1925–1928	22nd	Hutt	Liberal
1928	Changed allegiance to:		United
1928–1929	23rd	Hutt	United

Wilford was elected to the Wellington Suburbs electorate in the 1896 general election, but the result was declared void after an election petition on the grounds of corrupt and illegal practices as Wilford had exceeded the £200 election spending limit which had only recently been introduced. Charles Wilson was elected MP for that electorate following a by-election on 23 April 1897.

Wilford then won the Wellington Suburbs electorate in the 1899 election and the new Hutt electorate from the 1902 election, which he held until he resigned on 18 November 1929.

He was Chairman of Committees from 1909 to 1910.

Wilford was a member of the Wellington Harbour Board from 1900 to 1910, and chaired the Board from 1908 onwards. In 1901 Wilford ran for the Wellington mayoralty, losing to incumbent mayor John Aitken by 3,069 votes. He championed the redevelopment of the Hutt Road and railway linking Wellington city to the Hutt Valley from 1899 and 1911, skillfully working with and around local body groups to achieve a rather costly upgrade of the existing infrastructure. He resigned from the Harbour Board when he became Mayor of Wellington in 1910 for one year. After being re-elected unopposed he resigned as mayor of Wellington due to health issues.

Wilford almost died in 1911 after complications following an appendicitis operation. His health was to never fully recover. Wilford was forced to sail to England in early 1912 for more advanced surgery and during this long absence his position within the Liberal party was significantly weakened.

=== Minister ===
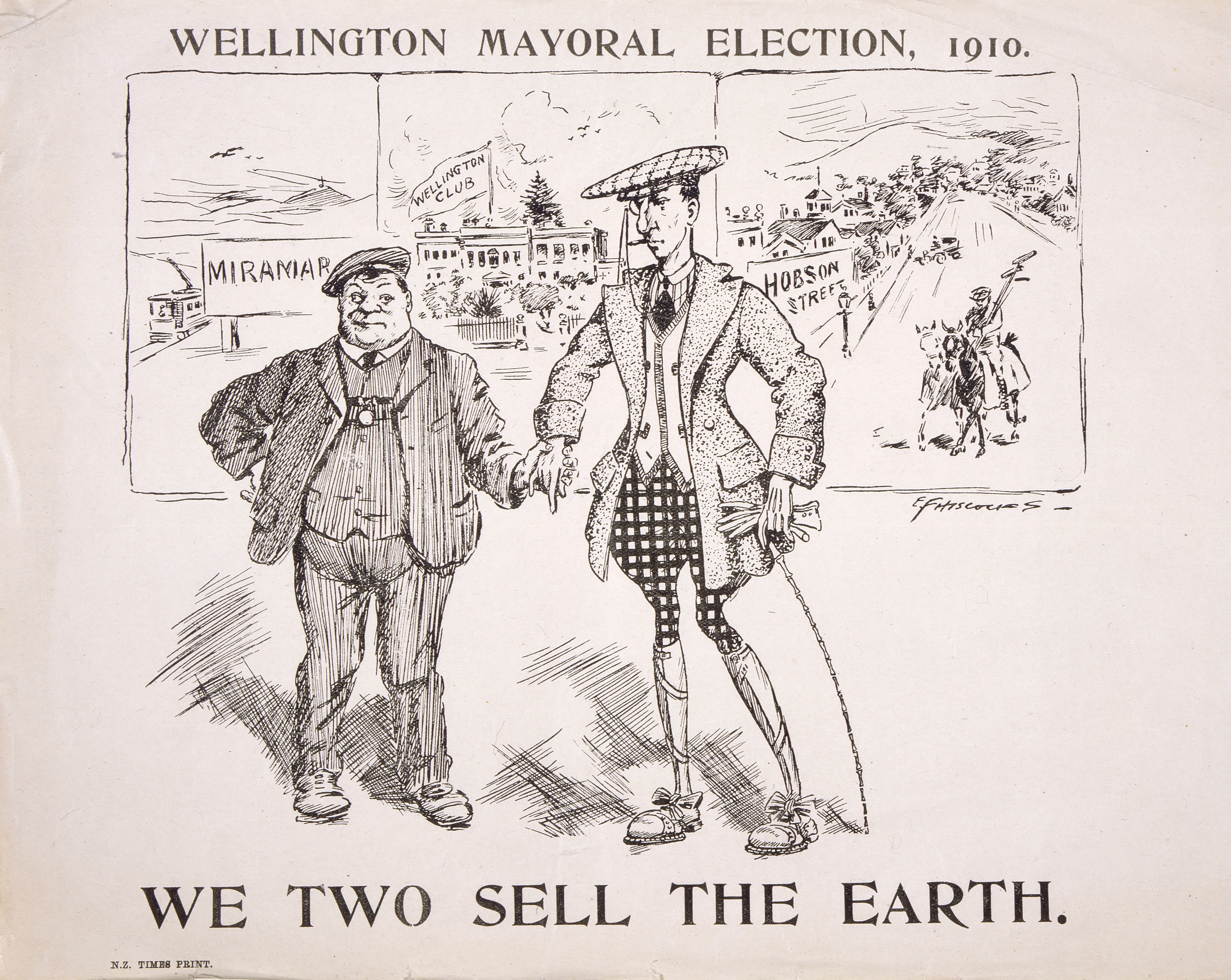
Wellington Mayoral election, 1910

He was Minister of Justice, Minister of Marine and Minister of Stamps in the World War I National government from 14 November 1917 to 22 August 1919 under William Massey.

At a May 1919 caucus meeting to discuss the coalition between the Liberal and Reform parties a majority of members voted in favour of ending the arrangement upon leader Sir Joseph Ward's return from Europe. Wilford worked with his colleagues (particularly William MacDonald and George Russell) to develop an updated policy manifesto for the next election. Following Ward's failure to gain re-election to parliament at the 1919 general election, Wilford nominated MacDonald to assume the leadership of the Liberal Party.

=== Leader of the Opposition ===
Wilford became the Leader of the Liberal Party and therefore Leader of the Opposition upon the death of William MacDonald in 1920. However, he was initially hampered in this position due to many Liberal MPs' wishes to remain leaderless until their defeated leader, Joseph Ward could re-enter Parliament. By 1922 Wilford had achieved a reconciliation with the Liberal's dissidents and contested the 1922 election as party leader.

There was talk of a proposed alliance of sorts between the Liberal and Labour parties in order to avoid vote splitting, similar to the Lib-Lab Pact in the UK. Wilford entered into discussions with Labour leader Harry Holland over a joint campaign and upon winning, forming a coalition to set up a proportional representation electoral system. The talks broke down however after Wilford demanded to hold office for a full term before holding an election under the new system.

The Liberals fared better under Wilford's leadership in 1922 than in the previous election, gaining an additional five seats. This can partly be attributed to Labour not standing candidates in all electorates against the Liberals in line with the ultimately failed joint campaign talks. However, the Liberals were still unable to regain office and by 1925, Wilford had yielded the leadership to George Forbes. Wilford's departure was due to "severe nervous debility" after "... the last occasion on which he made a speech in the House [and] it was evident that he spoke with a considerable want of confidence in himself ... [and] had difficulty in finishing his speech and nearly broke down."

Labour politician, John A. Lee, a colleague who knew Wilford well, stated that while no one could have saved the Liberal party from its ultimate demise, if Wilford had been in better health, he would have delayed it, returning the Liberals to power and served as Prime Minister himself.

=== United Party ===
From 10 December 1928 to 10 December 1929 he was Minister of Justice for a second period, in the cabinet of Joseph Ward. Wilford was also Minister of Defence in the United ministry. This was a reflection that he "had a long-standing interest in naval policy, especially the Singapore Base, ... had travelled extensively in the Pacific and the Far East", and he "was regarded as something of a specialist in Far Eastern questions." He resigned from Parliament on 18 November 1929 to become High Commissioner to the United Kingdom.

== Honours and recognition ==
In 1927 a newly built school in Petone was named Wilford School in his honour. On 29 October 1929, Wilford was appointed King's Counsel. In the 1930 King's Birthday Honours, Wilford was appointed a Knight Commander of the Order of St Michael and St George. In 1935, he was awarded the King George V Silver Jubilee Medal.

== Death ==
Wilford died at Wellington on 22 June 1939, survived by his wife and two children. His wife, Georgia, Lady Wilford, died in Cheltenham, England, in 1952.

== See also ==
- List of King's and Queen's Counsel in New Zealand
- Electoral history of Thomas Wilford

== Notes ==
Political offices
Preceded by Kennedy Macdonald	Chair of Wellington Harbour Board; 1908–1910	Succeeded by Robert Fletcher
Preceded by Roderick McKenzie	Chairman of Committees of the House of Representatives; 1909–1910	Succeeded by James Colvin
Preceded by Alfred Newman	Mayor of Wellington; 1910–1912	Succeeded by David McLaren
Preceded by Josiah Hanan	Minister of Justice; 1917–1919 1928–1929	Succeeded by Gordon Coates
Preceded by William Downie Stewart	Minister of Justice; 1917–1919 1928–1929	Succeeded by Thomas Sidey
Preceded by Alexander Herdman	Minister of Police; 1918–1919 1928–1929	Succeeded by William Massey
Preceded by William Downie Stewart	Minister of Police; 1918–1919 1928–1929	Succeeded by John Cobbe
New Zealand Parliament
Preceded by Alfred Newman	Member of Parliament for Wellington Suburbs; 1896 1899–1902	Succeeded by Charles Wilson
Preceded by Charles Wilson	Member of Parliament for Wellington Suburbs; 1896 1899–1902	In abeyance Title next held by John Luke
In abeyance Title last held by Alfred Newman	Member of Parliament for Hutt; 1902–1929	Succeeded by Walter Nash
Party political offices
Preceded by William MacDonald	Leader of the Liberal Party; 1920–1925	Succeeded by George Forbes
Diplomatic posts
Preceded by James Parr	High Commissioner to the United Kingdom; 1930–1934	Succeeded by James Parr
