= Felix McGuire =

New Zealand politician

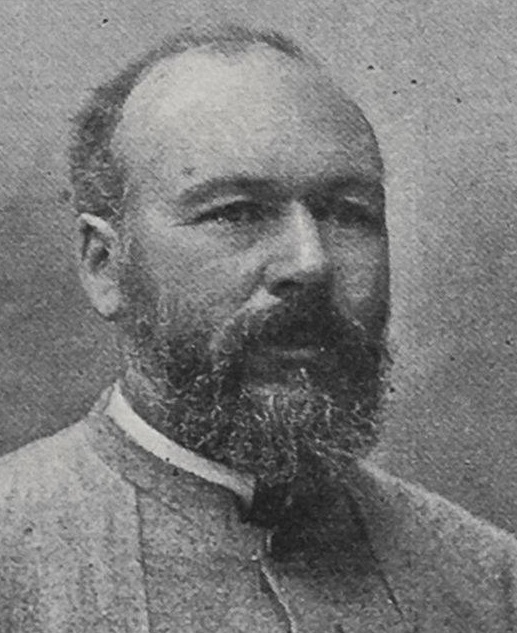

Member of the New Zealand Parliament for Hawera
- In office 4 December 1896 – 25 November 1902
- Preceded by: Constituency created
- Succeeded by: Charles E. Major

Member of the New Zealand Parliament for Egmont
- In office 17 February 1891 – 4 December 1896
- Preceded by: Harry Atkinson
- Succeeded by: Walter Symes

Personal details
- Born: 1847 County Fermanagh, Ireland
- Died: 6 April 1915 (aged 67–68) Auckland, New Zealand
- Spouse: Sarah Jane Quin (m. 1868)
- Children: 8
- Occupation: Storekeeper

Felix McGuire (1847 – 6 April 1915) was a soldier and later independent conservative Member of Parliament in New Zealand.

== Biography ==
=== Early life and career ===
McGuire was born in County Fermanagh, Ireland, in 1847. He was educated locally before emigrating to Australia in 1863, living there only briefly, before relocating again to New Zealand. He was a soldier from 1863 to 1864 for the duration of the Invasion of the Waikato. Afterwards he was a cavalryman during the Second Taranaki War, based at Wanganui. He also served in Tītokowaru's War in 1868–9. After those engagements he transferred to the army commissariat department. During his military career he was mentioned in despatches and promoted, being commissioned as lieutenant. Once he left service in the army he entered business in Patea as a storekeeper of a general store. Several years later he moved to Hawera, before moving again, this time to Auckland, in 1882. He studied law in Auckland and returned to Taranaki in 1885.

=== Political career ===
New Zealand Parliament
Years	Term	Electorate	Party
1891–1893	11th	Egmont	Independent
1893–1896	12th	Egmont	Independent
1896–1899	13th	Hawera	Conservative
1899–1902	14th	Hawera	Conservative

McGuire entered politics via local bodies. He was member for South Taranaki in the Taranaki Province Council until 1875 hen provincial governments were abolished. After that he was the chairman of the Patea County Council, and after that became the first Mayor of Hawera. He unsuccessfully contested the Egmont electorate in the 1887 election and 1890 election. In 1887 he stood as a ministerialist candidate, supporting the Stout–Vogel ministry, despite not supporting Sir Julius Vogel the nominative co-leader of the government. He was assisted in his campaign by John Ballance, a minister in the Stout–Vogel government, but was unsuccessful losing to the leader of the opposition members Sir Harry Atkinson. In his 1890 campaign, he loaned Ballance (a newspaper proprietor) ₤300 to establish the Egmont Settler newspaper. The Settler printed anti-Atkinson articles in an attempt to claim the Egmont seat for McGuire (as well as backing George Hutchison in Waitotara).

He was elected to the Egmont electorate in a 1891 by-election after the resignation of Atkinson, and represented it until the end of the 12th Parliament in 1896. He successfully contested the Hawera electorate in the 1896 general election and served until he was defeated in the 1902 general election. He once again stood (unsuccessfully) for Hawera in 1905.

McGuire was initially an independent MP. His by-election victory was celebrated by local members of the governing Liberal Party as he had defeated the opposition candidate. Ballance was pleased to see his friend win the seat, thinking that an ally of his winning the seat was a fillip for his government. He stated McGuire's victory "had a marked effect in strengthening the hands of the Government throughout the country." He did not join the Liberal Party, but Premier Richard Seddon – who succeeded Ballance, wanted to leave the door open to McGuire joining the government by only standing a weak government candidate against him at the 1893 election. He was re-elected as an independent again in 1893, but towards the end of the 1896 session he joined the opposition caucus, after becoming increasing critical of the government. He was particularly opposed to the government's land and settlement policies. At the 1899 election Seddon made specific efforts to unseat McGuire by ensuring a stronger government candidate, however this was undercut by the presence of an independent liberal candidate who split the vote and allowed McGuire to be returned to parliament.

He was an outspoken MP and while not noted as a particularly talented orator, he was noted for speaking commonsense with the "proverbial good humor of an Irishman" though could be critical when he wished. While being initially on friendly terms with the government of Seddon, where at one time it was thought that he might achieve a Cabinet post, policy differences drove him away from Seddon and into opposition instead.

=== Later life and death ===
After leaving parliament McGuire retired to Mount Royal, Okaiawa, where he lived for several years. In about 1913 he left to live in Auckland.

McGuire died on 6 April 1915 at his home in the Auckland suburb of Epsom, and was buried in Waikaraka Cemetery.

== Citations ==
New Zealand Parliament
Preceded by Harry Atkinson	Member of Parliament for Egmont; 1891–1896	Succeeded by Walter Symes
New constituency	Member of Parliament for Hawera; 1896–1902	Succeeded by Charles E. Major
