= Wellington Suburbs (electorate) =

Wellington Suburbs was a parliamentary electorate in Wellington, New Zealand. It existed from 1893 to 1902, then from 1908 to 1911, and from 1919 to 1946. The electorate was represented by six Members of Parliament.

== Population centres ==
In the 1892 electoral redistribution, population shift to the North Island required the transfer of one seat from the South Island to the north. The resulting ripple effect saw every electorate established in 1890 have its boundaries altered, and eight electorates were established for the first time, including Wellington Suburbs.

== History ==
Suburbs of Wellington was formed for the 1893 election. The first representative was Alfred Newman, who had been in Parliament since a 1884 by-election. At the next election in 1896, Newman stood in Otaki and was defeated.

Thomas Wilford of the Liberal Party won the 1896 election, but the result was declared void after an election petition on the grounds of corrupt and illegal practices. Charles Wilson, also of the Liberal Party, was elected MP for Wellington Suburbs following a by-election on 23 April 1897, but retired at the end of the term in 1899. Wilford then won the electorate in the 1899 election. Wellington Suburbs was abolished in 1902, and Wilford successfully contested the Hutt electorate instead.

The electorate was recreated as Wellington Suburbs in 1908 for one parliamentary term, i.e. until 1911. John Luke of the Liberal Party won the 1908 election. He was defeated for Wellington Suburbs and Country in the 1911 election.

The electorate was recreated in 1919. Robert Wright, who was first elected to Parliament in 1908 and was most recently representing the Wellington Suburbs and Country electorate, won the 1919 election representing the Reform Party. He continued to represent the electorate until he unsuccessfully stood in the Wellington West electorate in the 1938 election.

Wright was succeeded by Harry Combs in 1938. He was a member of the Labour Party and represented the electorate for two parliamentary terms until 1946, when it was abolished again. Combs successfully contested Onslow in 1946.

=== Members of Parliament ===
The electorate was represented by six Members of Parliament.

Key

Conservative Liberal Reform Independent Labour

Elections	Winner
(originally as Suburbs of Wellington)
1893 election	Alfred Newman
1896 election	Thomas Wilford
1897 by-election	Charles Wilson
1899 election	Thomas Wilford (2nd period)
(Electorate abolished 1902–1908, renamed as Wellington Suburbs)
1908 election	John Luke
(Electorate abolished 1911–1919; see Wellington Suburbs and Country)
1919 election	Robert Wright
1922 election	Robert Wright
1925 election	Robert Wright
1928 election	Robert Wright
1931 election	Robert Wright
1935 election	Robert Wright
1938 election	Harry Combs
1943 election	Harry Combs
(electorate abolished 1946; see Onslow)

== Election results ==
=== 1943 election ===
1943 general election: Wellington Suburbs
Party	Candidate	Votes	%	±%
Labour	Harry Combs	9,927	50.37	−10.25
National	Bill Veitch	7,346	37.28	
Democratic Labour	Les Frame	2,207	11.20	
Majority		2,581	13.10	−8.47
Turnout		19,707	91.45	−1.65
Registered electors		21,549		

=== 1938 election ===
1938 general election: Wellington Suburbs
Party	Candidate	Votes	%	±%
Labour	Harry Combs	8,887	60.62	
National	Ossie Mazengarb	5,724	39.04	
Informal votes		51	0.34	−0.30
Majority		3,163	21.57	
Turnout		14,662	93.10	+5.81
Registered electors		15,748		

=== 1935 election ===
1935 general election: Wellington Suburbs
Party	Candidate	Votes	%	±%
Independent	Robert Wright	8,947	55.78	+0.17
Labour	Peter Butler	7,091	44.21	
Informal votes		104	0.64	−0.16
Majority		1,856	11.57	−7.03
Turnout		16,038	87.29	+5.09
Registered electors		18,372		

=== 1931 election ===
1931 general election: Wellington Suburbs
Party	Candidate	Votes	%	±%
Reform	Robert Wright	7,682	55.61	+10.60
Labour	Tom Brindle	5,112	37.01	+7.54
Independent	Kenneth McLennan	1,020	7.38	−18.14
Informal votes		111	0.80	−0.44
Majority		2,570	18.60	+3.06
Turnout		13,925	82.20	−5.46
Registered electors		16,940		

=== 1928 election ===
1928 general election: Wellington Suburbs
Party	Candidate	Votes	%	±%
Reform	Robert Wright	5,748	45.01	−10.50
Labour	Tom Brindle	3,763	29.47	
United	Kenneth McLennan	3,260	25.53	
Informal votes		160	1.24	−0.16
Majority		1,985	15.54	+3.10
Turnout		12,931	87.66	−3.19
Registered electors		14,751		

=== 1925 election ===
1925 general election: Wellington Suburbs
Party	Candidate	Votes	%	±%
Reform	Robert Wright	6,881	55.51	+4.67
Labour	Charles Chapman	5,339	43.07	
Informal votes		174	1.40	+0.12
Majority		1,542	12.44	+9.48
Turnout		12,394	90.85	−0.13
Registered electors		13,641		

=== 1922 election ===
1922 general election: Wellington Suburbs
Party	Candidate	Votes	%	±%
Reform	Robert Wright	4,992	50.84	+6.54
Labour	Alec Croskery	4,701	47.87	+15.77
Informal votes		126	1.28	+0.15
Majority		291	2.96	−9.24
Turnout		9,819	90.98	+11.36
Registered electors		10,792		

=== 1919 election ===
1919 general election: Wellington Suburbs
Party	Candidate	Votes	%	±%
Reform	Robert Wright	4,091	44.30	
Labour	Alec Croskery	2,964	32.10	
Liberal	Dunbar Sloane	2,073	22.45	
Informal votes		105	1.13	
Majority		1,127	12.20	
Turnout		9,233	79.62	
Registered electors		11,595		

=== 1908 election ===
1908 general election: Wellington Suburbs, first ballot
Party	Candidate	Votes	%	±%
Liberal	John Luke	2,204	32.46	
Independent	John Edward Fitzgerald	1,908	28.10	
Conservative	Robert Bradford Williams	1,367	20.13	
Ind. Labour League	Frank Moore	644	9.48	
Independent Labour	Tom Young	613	9.03	
Liberal	James Walter Braithwaite	54	0.80	
Majority		296	4.36	
Turnout		6,790	78.67	
Registered electors		8,631		

1908 general election: Wellington Suburbs, second ballot
Party	Candidate	Votes	%	±%
Liberal	John Luke	3,884	58.67	
Independent	John Edward Fitzgerald	2,736	41.33	
Majority		1,148	16.91	
Turnout		6,620	76.70	
Registered electors		8,631		

=== 1899 election ===
1899 general election: Suburbs of Wellington
Party	Candidate	Votes	%	±%
Liberal	Thomas Wilford	2,298	50.39	
Conservative	Alfred Newman	1,762	38.64	
Independent Liberal	Richard Clement Kirk	491	10.77	
Independent	Richard Giles Knight	9	0.20	
Majority		536	11.75	
Turnout		4,560	74.44	
Registered electors		6,126		

=== 1897 by-election ===
1897 Wellington Suburbs by-election
Party	Candidate	Votes	%	±%
Liberal	Charles Wilson	2,036	51.76	
Conservative	Arthur Atkinson	1,897	48.23	
Majority		139	3.53	
Turnout		3,933		

=== 1896 election ===
1896 general election: Suburbs of Wellington
Party	Candidate	Votes	%	±%
Liberal	Thomas Wilford	2,194	53.05	+4.80
Conservative	Thomas William Hislop	1,942	46.95	
Majority		252	6.09	
Turnout		4,136		

=== 1893 election ===
1893 general election: Suburbs of Wellington
Party	Candidate	Votes	%	±%
Conservative	Alfred Newman	1,839	51.74	
Liberal	Thomas Wilford	1,715	48.25	
Majority		124	3.48	
Turnout		3,554	78.21	
Registered electors		4,544		
