= Edwin Edwards (New Zealand politician) =

English-born New Zealand businessman and local politician

Edwin Edwards (5 April 1862 – 31 May 1909) was a New Zealand businessman, local politician, newspaper proprietor and editor, balladeer. He was born in Camberwell, Surrey, England on 5 April 1862. He unsuccessfully contested the Ohinemuri electorate in the 1896 election against Alfred Cadman.
