= 1896 New Zealand general election =

1896 general election
- 4 (general) & 19 December (Māori) 1896

All 74 seats in the New Zealand House of Representatives 38 seats were needed for a majority
- Turnout: 76.1%
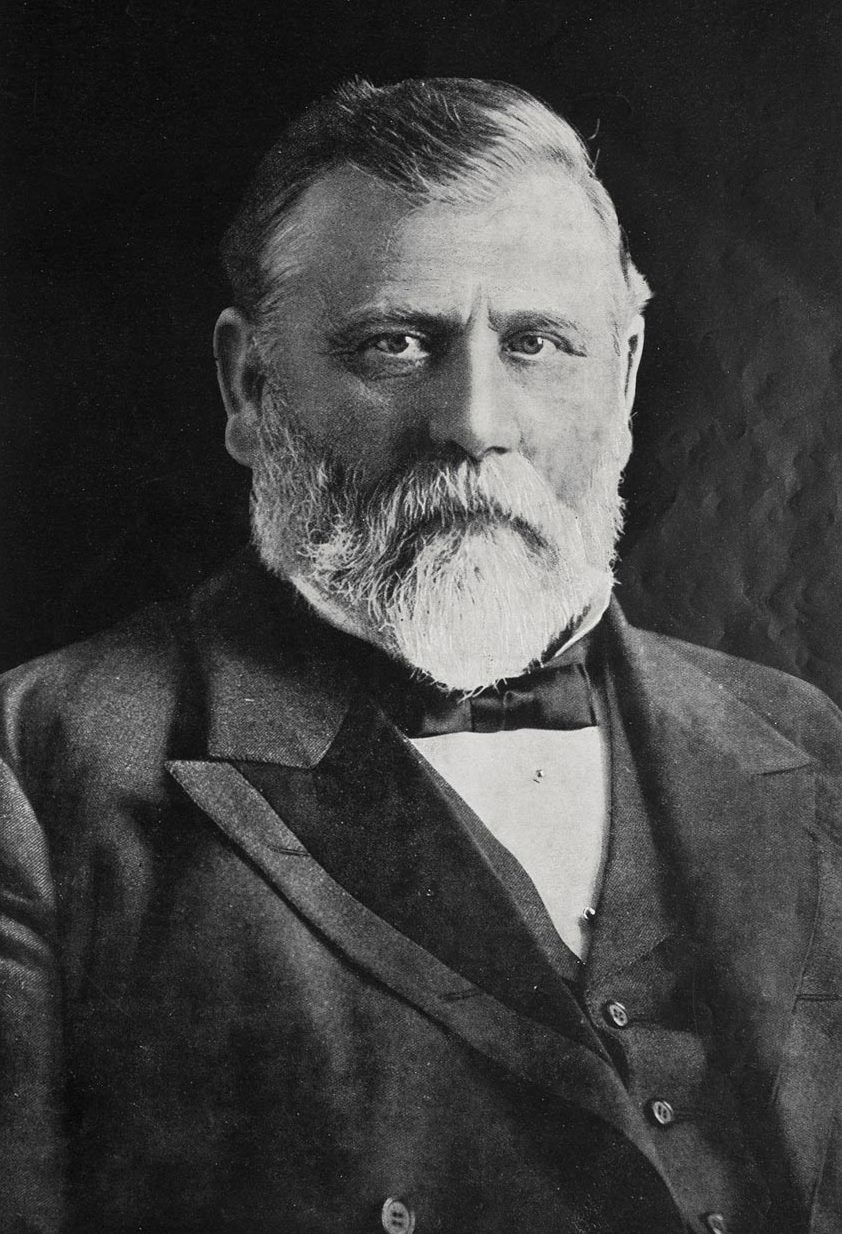

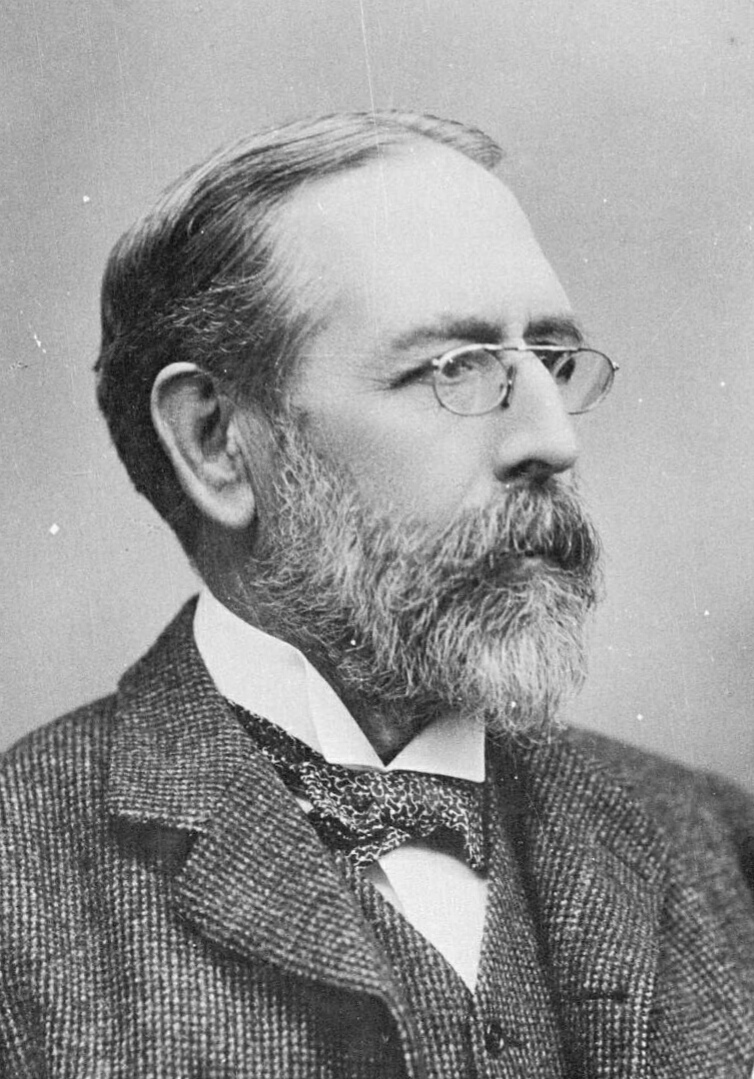
	First party	Second party
Leader	Richard Seddon	William Russell
Party	Liberal	Conservative
Leader since	28 April 1893	26 June 1894
Leader's seat	Westland	Hawke's Bay
Last election	51 seats, 57.8%	13 seats, 24.5%
Seats won	39	26
Seat change	▼12	▲13
Popular vote	184,650	114,574
Percentage	54.8%	34.0%
Swing	▼3.0%	▲9.5%
- Results of the election.
Premier before election
Richard Seddon
Liberal
Subsequent Premier
Richard Seddon
Liberal

The 1896 New Zealand general election was held on Wednesday, 4 December in the general electorates, and on Thursday, 19 December in the Māori electorates to elect a total of 74 MPs to the 13th session of the New Zealand Parliament. A total number of 337,024 (76.1%) voters turned out to vote.

1896 was the year the limit of £200 was placed on each candidate's campaign spending.

== Background ==
The Liberal government campaigned on a platform that the election was between the people and the "selfish few". The economy stagnated, raising unemployment, which caused support for the Liberals to fall in the cities and they lost many seats, though not enough to be removed from office by the Conservatives. In rural areas, the swing in support was not as large due to the public works and land settlement programmes helping to support the regions. In June 1896 Seddon had replaced Joseph Ward as Finance Minister whilst the latter had resigned after being declared temporarily bankrupt. As such Seddon himself took on the workload of the treasury making him more susceptible to opposition attacks over the economy. He proved to be a cautious financier, budgeting for surpluses while maintaining the spirit of self reliance his predecessor John Ballance had advocated.

== Results ==
=== Party totals ===
The following table gives party strengths and vote distribution according to Wilson (1985), who records Maori representatives as Independents prior to the 1905 election.

Election results
Party	Candidates	Total votes	Percentage	Seats won	Change
Liberal	81	184,650	54.78%	39	-12
Conservative	70	114,574	33.99%	26	+13
Independent	60	37,800	11.23%	9	-1

=== Votes summary ===
Popular Vote
Liberal	54.78%
Conservative	33.99%
Independents	11.23%

Parliament seats
Liberal	52.70%
Conservative	35.13%
Independents	12.16%

The table below shows the results of the 1896 general election:

Key

Liberal Conservative Independent Liberal Liberal–Labour Independent

Electorate results for the 1896 New Zealand general election
Electorate	Incumbent	Winner	Majority	Runner up
General electorates
Ashburton	John McLachlan	Edward George Wright	242	John McLachlan
Ashley	Richard Meredith		372	Henry Fear Reece
Auckland, City of	Thomas Thompson		2,516	Arthur Rosser
Auckland, City of	Charles Button	James Job Holland	1,622	Arthur Rosser
Auckland, City of	William Crowther		1,328	Arthur Rosser
Avon	William Tanner		457	George McIntyre
Awarua	Joseph Ward		783	Cuthbert Cowan
Bay of Islands	Robert Houston		627	John Press
Bay of Plenty	William Kelly	William Herries	132	William Kelly
Bruce	James Allen		1,059	William Auld
Buller	Roderick McKenzie	Patrick O'Regan	292	James Colvin
Caversham	Arthur Morrison		1,178	Thomas Sidey
Christchurch, City of	Charles Lewis		6,570	William Whitehouse Collins
Christchurch, City of	George Smith		5,940	William Whitehouse Collins
Christchurch, City of	William Collins	Tommy Taylor	5,445	William Whitehouse Collins
Clutha	Thomas Mackenzie	James Thomson	903	John Edie
Dunedin, City of	William Hutchison	Scobie Mackenzie	2,132	David Pinkerton
Dunedin, City of	David Pinkerton	John A. Millar	547	David Pinkerton
Dunedin, City of	William Earnshaw	Henry Fish	378	David Pinkerton
Eden	Edwin Mitchelson	John Bollard	214	Jackson Palmer
Egmont	Felix McGuire	Walter Symes	270	William Monkhouse
Ellesmere	William Montgomery Jr.		564	Frederick Arthur Anson
Franklin	Benjamin Harris	William Massey	474	Benjamin Harris
Geraldine	New electorate	Frederick Flatman	211	Arthur Rhodes
Grey	Arthur Guinness		1,777	Robert Francis Bell
Hawera	New electorate	Felix McGuire	36	Benjamin Robbins
Hawke's Bay	William Russell		833	Alfred Fraser
Invercargill	James Whyte Kelly		578	John Sinclair
Kaiapoi	David Buddo	Richard Moore	259	David Buddo
Lyttelton	New electorate	John Joyce	446	William Jacques
Manawatu	New electorate	Jack Stevens	71	Robert Bruce
Manukau	Maurice O'Rorke		215	Frank Buckland
Masterton	Alexander Hogg		263	Donald John Cameron
Marsden	Robert Thompson (Note: Robert Thompson was regarded as Liberal in the previous Parliament)		402	Alfred H Mason
Mataura	Robert McNab	George Richardson	201	Robert McNab
Motueka	New electorate	Roderick McKenzie	126	Richmond Hursthouse
Napier	Samuel Carnell	Douglas Maclean	747	Samuel Carnell
Nelson	John Graham		343	Jesse Piper
Oamaru	Tom Duncan		771	James Dickson Sievwright
Ohinemuri	New electorate	Alfred Cadman	2,037	Edwin Edwards
Otaki	James Wilson	Henry Augustus Field	408	Alfred Newman
Pahiatua	New electorate	John O'Meara	30	Robert Manisty
Palmerston	Frederick Pirani (Note: Frederick Pirani was regarded as Liberal in the previous Parliament)		50	David Buick
Parnell	Frank Lawry		470	Samuel Vaile
Patea	George Hutchison		605	Arthur Remington
Rangitikei	Jack Stevens	Frank Lethbridge	271	Walter A L Bailey
Riccarton	George Russell	William Rolleston	391	George Russell (Note: George Russell distanced himself from the Liberal Party and, together with Frederick Pirani, unsuccessfully tried to form the Radical Party)
Selwyn	Alfred Saunders	Cathcart Wason	182	Alfred Saunders
Taieri	Walter Carncross		554	John Graham
Taranaki	New electorate	Henry Brown	97	Edward Smith
Thames	James McGowan		323	Edmund Taylor
Timaru	William Hall-Jones		640	Francis Henry Smith
Tuapeka	William Larnach		21	Charles Rawlins
Waiapu	James Carroll		368	Cecil Fitzroy
Waihemo	John McKenzie		554	John Duncan
Waikato	Alfred Cadman	Frederic Lang	1,012	Edward Walker
Waipawa	Charles Hall	George Hunter	211	Charles Hall
Waikouaiti	James Green	Edmund Allen	761	John J. Ramsay
Wairarapa	Wally Buchanan		333	J. T. Marryat Hornsby
Wairau	Lindsay Buick	Charlie Mills	58	Lindsay Buick (Note: Lindsay Buick distanced himself from the Liberal Party and became an Independent Liberal candidate)
Waitaki	William Steward		999	Duncan Sutherland
Waitemata	William Massey	Richard Monk	171	Heathcote Jackman
Wakatipu	William Fraser		335	James George
Wallace	James Mackintosh	Michael Gilfedder	116	Rev. Thomas Neave
Wanganui	Archibald Willis	Gilbert Carson	84	Archibald Willis
Wellington, City of	Robert Stout	Robert Stout (Note: Robert Stout was regarded as Liberal in the previous Parliament)	475	Arthur Atkinson
Wellington, City of	Francis Bell	John Hutcheson	580	Arthur Atkinson
Wellington, City of	John Duthie	George Fisher	28	Arthur Atkinson
Wellington Suburbs	Alfred Newman	Thomas Wilford	252	Thomas William Hislop
Westland	Richard Seddon		1,883	Joseph Grimmond
Māori electorates
Eastern Maori	Wi Pere		1,744	Tamati Tautuhi
Northern Maori	Hone Heke		1,316	Eparaima Te Mutu Kapa
Southern Maori	Tame Parata		113	Thomas Ellison (Note: The affiliation of Thomas Ellison, who is listed in most contemporary sources under his Māori name Tame Rangiwahia Erihana, is not known)
Western Maori	Ropata Te Ao	Henare Kaihau	731	Ropata Te Ao

Table footnotes:

The election of Thomas Wilford for the electorate of Suburbs of Wellington was declared void by an election petition on the grounds of corrupt and illegal practices. Charles Wilson was elected MP for that electorate following a by-election on 23 April 1897.

== Summary of changes ==
- A boundary redistribution resulted in the abolition of seven seats:
  - Chalmers, held by John A. Millar
  - Inangahua, held by Patrick O'Regan
  - New Plymouth, held by Edward Smith
  - Pareora, held by Frederick Flatman
  - Rangitata, held by William Maslin
  - Waimea-Sounds, held by Charlie Mills
  - Waipa, held by Frederic Lang
- At the same time, seven new seats came into being:
  - Geraldine
  - Hawera
  - Manawatu
  - Motueka
  - Ohinemuri
  - Pahiatua
  - Taranaki
