= Alfred Newman (politician) =

New Zealand politician (1849–1924)

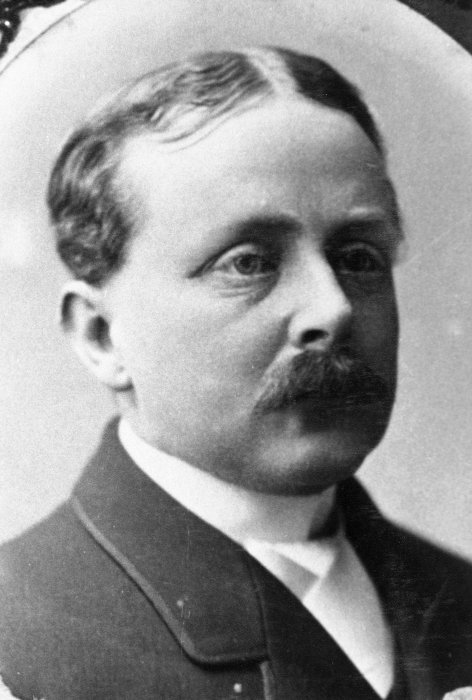

17th Mayor of Wellington
- In office 1909–1910
- Preceded by: Thomas William Hislop
- Succeeded by: Thomas Wilford

Personal details
- Born: 27 April 1849 Madras, India
- Died: 3 April 1924 (aged 74) Wellington, New Zealand
- Party: Reform
- Spouse: Octavia Featherston

Alfred Kingcome Newman (27 April 1849 – 3 April 1924) was the mayor of Wellington, New Zealand, in 1909–1910, and a Member of Parliament.

== Early life ==
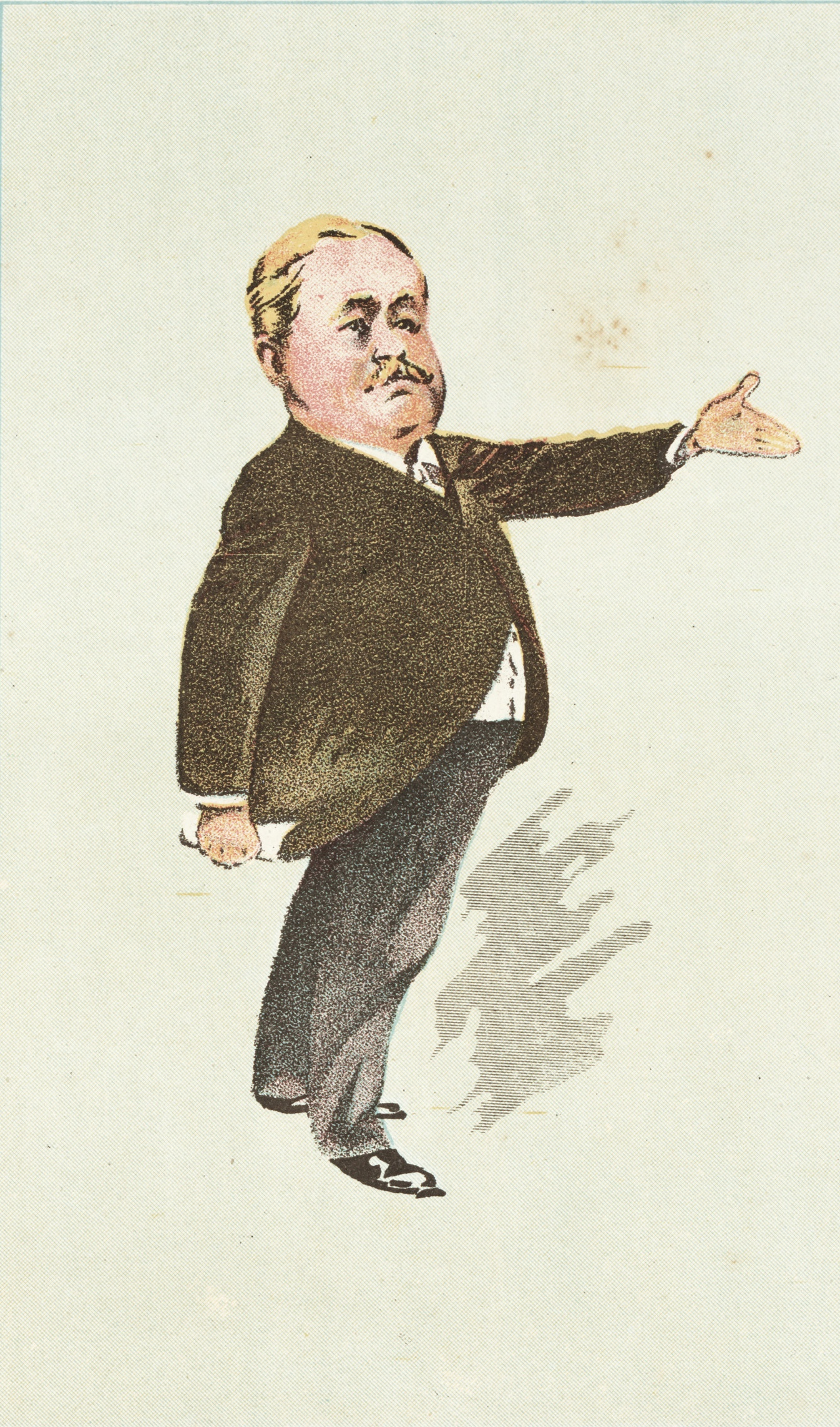
1896 caricature of Dr Alfred Newman

Newman was born in Madras, India, in 1849. His father was commander of an East India Company ship. The family migrated to New Zealand in 1853 and farmed at Waipukurau. He received his primary education in the Hawke's Bay Region and Auckland, and travelled in 1863 to receive his secondary education in Bath, England.

Newman became a doctor of medicine and returned to New Zealand in 1875.

== Political career ==
New Zealand Parliament
Years	Term	Electorate	Party
1884	8th	Thorndon	Independent
1884–1887	9th	Thorndon	Independent
1887–1890	10th	Thorndon	Independent
1890–1893	11th	Hutt	Independent
1893–1896	12th	Wellington Suburbs	Independent
1911–1914	18th	Wellington East	Reform
1914–1919	19th	Wellington East	Reform
1919–1922	20th	Wellington East	Reform

Newman was a Wellington City Councillor from 1881 to 1885. He was Mayor of Wellington in 1909–1910.

Newman contested the 1881 election in the Foxton electorate, where he came fifth of six candidates, beaten by James Wilson.

The resignation of William Levin from the Thorndon electorate caused an 1884 by-election. At the nomination meeting, Thomas Dwan, Alfred Newman and Henry Bunny were proposed as candidates, with Dwan winning the show of hands. At the 1884 election on 14 May Newman, Bunny and Dwan received 636, 379 and 121 votes, respectively making Newman re-elected unopposed. At the 1887 election, Newman beat William McLean by 873 to 425 votes.

The Thorndon electorate was abolished at the end of the parliamentary term in 1890. Newman successfully contested the Hutt electorate in the 1890 election. At the 1893 election, he successfully contested the Suburbs of Wellington electorate. He was defeated in 1896 when he stood for Otaki. In the 1899 election, he came second in the Suburbs of Wellington electorate.

He was MP for Wellington East, from 1911 to 1922, when he retired. From 1909 he belonged to the Reform Party.

He was a member of the Legislative Council from 1 June 1923 until his death, and for many years was on the Wellington Education Board, the Wellington College Board of Governors and the Senate of the University of New Zealand.

== Personal life ==
Newman was married to Octavia Featherston (1854–1912), daughter of Isaac Earl Featherston, a leading colonial politician. Newman was to have one son. The family prospered, owning estates at Wellington, Hawke's Bay and Wairarapa, and also ran small thoroughbred stud.

He died on 3 April 1924.

== Personal views ==
Newman did much to promote science but also held views on white supremacy which were common at the time.

== Legacy ==
Newman Terrace in Wellington is named after him.

== Notes ==
New Zealand Parliament
New constituency	Member of Parliament for Wellington Suburbs; 1893–1896	Succeeded by Thomas Wilford
Preceded by David McLaren	Member of Parliament for Wellington East; 1911–1922	Succeeded by Alec Monteith
Political offices
Preceded by Thomas William Hislop	Mayor of Wellington; 1909–1910	Succeeded by Thomas Wilford
