= 1891 Egmont by-election =

New Zealand by-election

- 17 February 1891
- Turnout: 1,899 (71.17%)
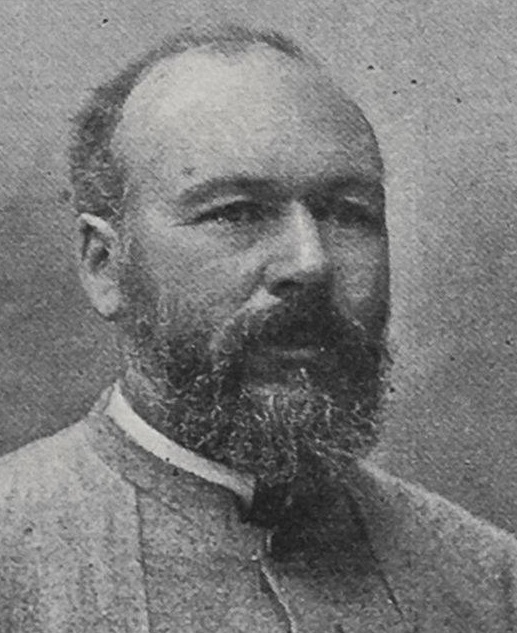

Candidate	Felix McGuire	Robert Bruce
Party	Independent	Conservative
Popular vote	986	913
Percentage	51.92	48.04
Member before election
Sir Harry Atkinson
Conservative
Elected Member
Felix McGuire
Independent

The 1891 Egmont by-election was a by-election held on 17 February 1891 during the 11th New Zealand Parliament in the Taranaki electorate of Egmont.

== Background ==
At the 1887 election and 1890 election elections, Sir Harry Atkinson was opposed by Felix McGuire. In 1887 McGuire stood as a ministerialist candidate, supporting the Stout–Vogel ministry. Curiously McGuire did not support Sir Julius Vogel the nominative co-leader of the government he was standing for. McGuire was assisted in his campaign by a minister in the Stout–Vogel government, John Ballance, though he lost to Atkinson. At the 1890 election, McGuire stood as an independent and loaned Ballance (who was also a newspaper proprietor) the sum of ₤300 to establish a new newspaper, the Egmont Settler. For the duration of the campaign, the Settler ceaselessly printed anti-Atkinson articles in an attempt to unseat Atkinson in Egmont. Atkinson would win nonetheless.

Despite winning his seat, Atkinson's government was defeated by the Liberal Party opposition led by Ballance. Atkinson resigned his parliamentary seat and appointed himself to the Legislative Council, along with six other Conservatives; to block any radical measures introduced by Ballance's new Liberal Government. He then made himself speaker of the Council. Consequently, a by-election was necessitated.

The by-election was contested by McGuire, who stood once again. McGuire was opposed solely by Robert Bruce who had previously represented Rangitikei and supported Atkinson's government. Despite McGuire's longstanding association with the now Premier Ballance, he declared himself an independent.

Both George Marchant and Vincent Pyke, each of whom had left parliament at the 1890 election, were speculated as potential candidates. Each had been asked to stand for the seat, but after consideration declined to do so.

== Results ==
The following table gives the election results:

1891 Egmont by-election
Party	Candidate	Votes	%	±%
Independent	Felix McGuire	986	51.92	+10.00
Conservative	Robert Bruce	913	48.04	
Majority		73	3.84	
Turnout		1,899	71.17	+0.45
Registered electors		2,668		

== Aftermath ==
McGuire's election victory was celebrated by local members of the Liberal Party who thought him preferable to an opposition MP. Ballance was delighted to witness his friend win the seat, thinking that an ally of his winning the seat was a boon for his government. He stated his belief that McGuire's victory "had a marked effect in strengthening the hands of the Government throughout the country."
