= 1897 Wellington Suburbs by-election =

New Zealand by-election

- 23 April 1897
- Turnout: 3,933
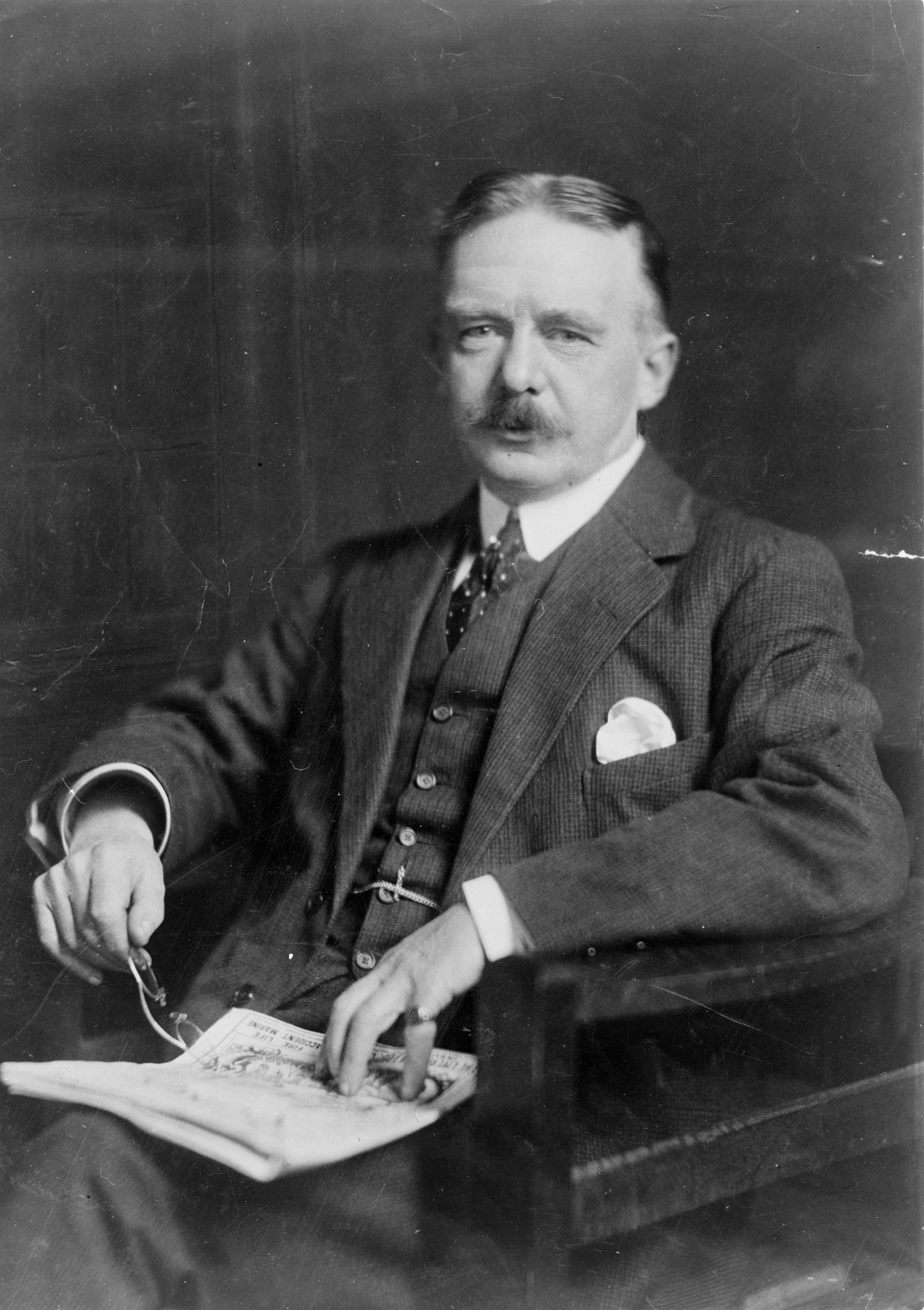

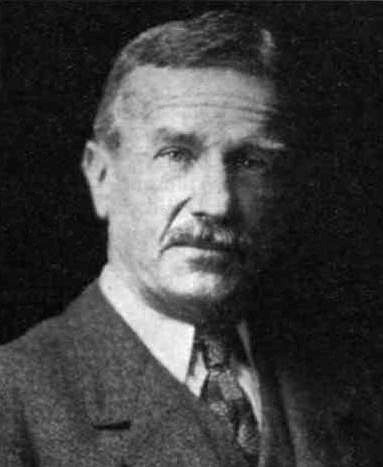
Candidate	Charles Wilson	Arthur Atkinson
Party	Liberal	Conservative
Popular vote	2,036	1,897
Percentage	51.76	48.23
Member before election
Thomas Wilford
Liberal
Elected Member
Charles Wilson
Liberal

The Wellington Suburbs by-election of 1897 was a by-election held on 23 April 1897 during the 13th New Zealand Parliament in the urban lower North Island electorate of Wellington Suburbs.

== Background ==
Thomas Wilford won the Wellington Suburbs seat in the 1896 election for the Liberal Party. However, he was subsequently declared guilty of corrupt electoral practices after an electoral petition was lodged after it was revealed he exceeded the £200 campaign spending limit which had been introduced for the election. As a result, the election was declared void.

The subsequent by-election for Wilford's seat was a two-way contest. Academic Charles Wilson contested the seat in the interests of the Liberal Government and Arthur Atkinson stood on behalf of the opposition. Wilson was successful in retaining the electorate for the Liberals, with a slightly reduced majority.

== Results ==
The following table gives the election results:

1897 Wellington Suburbs by-election
Party	Candidate	Votes	%	±%
Liberal	Charles Wilson	2,036	51.76	
Conservative	Arthur Atkinson	1,897	48.23	
Majority		139	3.53	
Turnout		3,933		

Wilson retired in 1899 when the next general election was held, and Wilford won the seat back on behalf of the Liberal Party. Two years later, Wilson was appointed as the first chief librarian of the Parliamentary library. Some saw this as controversial and merely a reward by the Liberal Government for his prior services to the Liberal Party.
