= Walter Symes =

New Zealand politician (1852–1914)

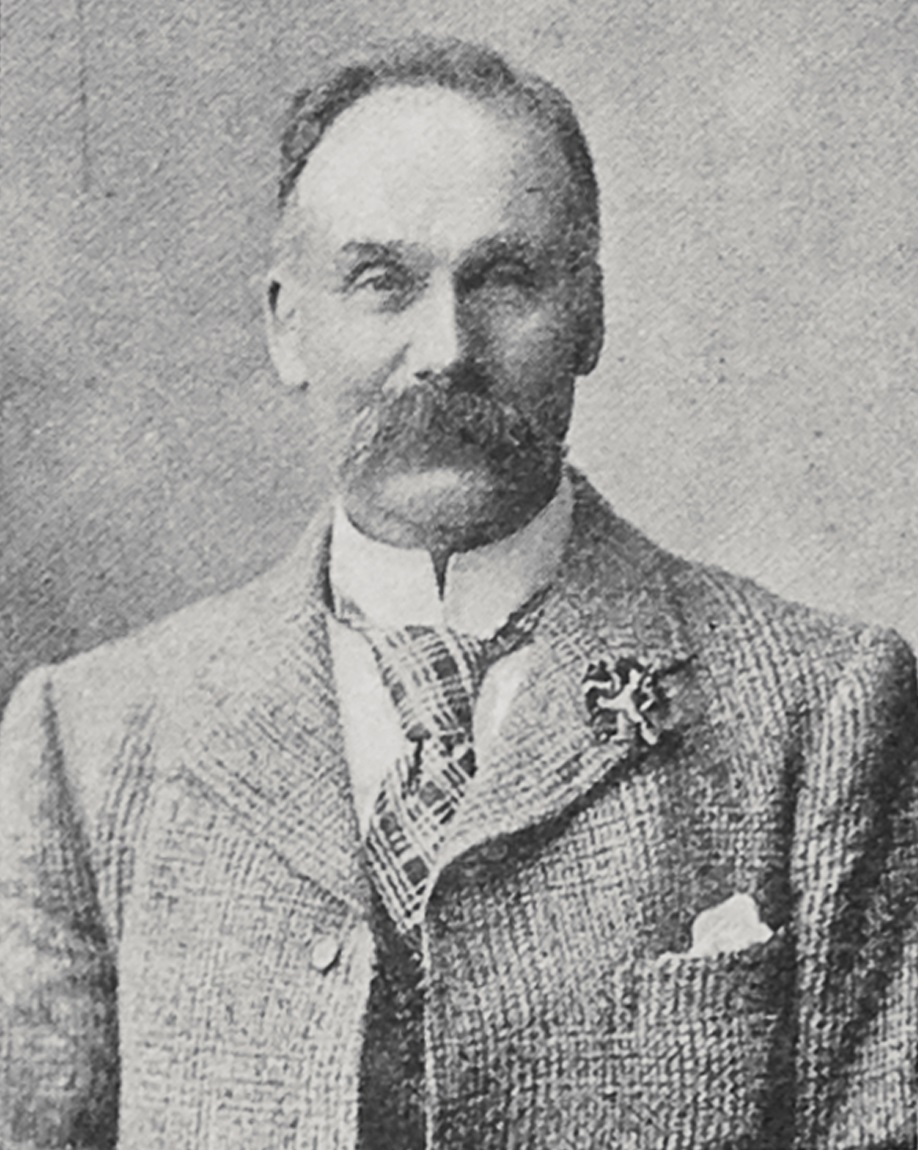

Member of the New Zealand Parliament for Egmont
- In office 1896–1902
- Preceded by: Felix McGuire
- Succeeded by: William Thomas Jennings

Member of the New Zealand Parliament for Patea
- In office 1902–1908
- Preceded by: Frederick Haselden
- Succeeded by: George Pearce

Personal details
- Born: 1852 Taranaki, New Zealand
- Died: 14 October 1914 (aged 63) Hamilton, New Zealand
- Party: Liberal
- Spouse: Elizabeth Anne Treweek (m. 1881)

Walter Symes (1852 – 14 October 1914) was a Liberal Party Member of Parliament in New Zealand.

== Biography ==
=== Early life ===
Walter Symes was born in Taranaki in 1852. He came from a rural background, with his parents (who were English immigrants) farming land at Mangorei at the outbreak of the New Zealand Wars. He lived in New Plymouth for some many years and it was there where he received his education in a school on the present site of Wesley Hall. He later moved to Wanganui.

=== Political career ===
New Zealand Parliament
Years	Term	Electorate	Party
1896–1899	13th	Egmont	Liberal
1899–1902	14th	Egmont	Liberal
1902–1905	15th	Patea	Liberal
1905–1908	16th	Patea	Liberal

He was elected as the Member of Parliament for the Egmont electorate from 1896 to 1902 representing the Liberal Party. He then held the Patea electorate from 1902 to 1908, when he was defeated standing for Stratford.

=== Death ===
Symes died in Hamilton on 14 October 1914, aged 63, and was buried at Hamilton West Cemetery. He was survived by his wife and children.

New Zealand Parliament
Preceded by Felix McGuire	Member of Parliament for Egmont; 1896–1902	Succeeded by William Jennings
Preceded by Frederick Haselden	Member of Parliament for Patea; 1902–1908	Succeeded by George Pearce
