= Egmont (New Zealand electorate) =

Egmont is a former New Zealand electorate, in south Taranaki. It existed from 1871 to 1978.

== Geographic coverage ==
Egmont is the old name of the mountain that is the Taranaki landmark of Mount Taranaki. A village north of the mountain is also called Egmont.

== History ==
This rural electorate was formed in 1871. Mount Egmont, after which it is named, was confiscated from Māori by the New Zealand Government under the powers of the New Zealand Settlements Act 1863, following the Second Taranaki War.

William Gisborne was the first elected representative in 1871, elected unopposed. He was a minister in the third Fox Ministry and resigned from Parliament when the government fell on 10 September 1872. Harry Atkinson won the resulting 1872 by-election. He held the electorate until 1891, when he resigned. During this time, he was Premier on four occasions.

Atkinson's resignation caused the 1891 by-election, which was won by Felix McGuire. He held the electorate until 1896, when he (successfully) stood for the Hawera electorate instead. He was succeeded by Walter Symes from 1896 until 1902, when he (successfully) stood for Patea.

The 1902 election was unusual in that two of the candidates died during the election campaign. The first one was John Elliot, who had narrowly lost the 1890 election against Edward Smith. Elliot died on 14 September; the Taranaki Herald had picked him as the likely winner of the 1902 contest. Elliot's death resulted in Richmond Hursthouse putting his name forward, only for him to die on 11 November. The election was contested between Bill Jennings and Charles Leech, with the former winning by seven votes following a recount. Jennings represented the electorate until 1908, when he (successfully) stood for Taumarunui.

Bradshaw Dive was elected in 1908 and held the electorate for one term. He was defeated in 1911 by Thomas Mackenzie, who resigned in 1912. Charles Wilkinson won the resulting 1912 by-election and retired in 1919. He was succeeded by Oswald Hawken, who won the 1919 election, but was defeated in 1928 by Wilkinson coming out of his retirement. This time, Wilkinson held the electorate until 1943, when he retired for good.

The electorate was then held by three members of the National Party; Ernest Corbett (1943–57), William Sheat (1957–66) and Venn Young (1966–78).

Egmont was abolished in 1978, and was replaced by the Waitotara electorate.

=== Members of Parliament ===
Egmont was represented by twelve Members of Parliament:

Key

Independent Conservative Liberal Reform National

Election	Winner
1871 election	William Gisborne
1872 by-election	Harry Atkinson
1876 election	Harry Atkinson
1879 election	Harry Atkinson
1881 election	Harry Atkinson
1884 election	Harry Atkinson
1887 election	Harry Atkinson
1890 election	Harry Atkinson
1891 by-election	Felix McGuire
1893 election	Felix McGuire
1896 election	Walter Symes
1899 election	Walter Symes
1902 election	Bill Jennings
1905 election	Bill Jennings
1908 election	Bradshaw Dive
1911 election	Thomas Mackenzie
1912 by-election	Charles Wilkinson
1914 election	Charles Wilkinson
1919 election	Oswald Hawken
1922 election	Oswald Hawken
1925 election	Oswald Hawken
1928 election	Charles Wilkinson
1931 election	Charles Wilkinson
1935 election	Charles Wilkinson
1938 election	Charles Wilkinson
1943 election	Ernest Corbett
1946 election	Ernest Corbett
1949 election	Ernest Corbett
1951 election	Ernest Corbett
1954 election	Ernest Corbett
1957 election	William Sheat
1960 election	William Sheat
1963 election	William Sheat
1966 election	Venn Young
1969 election	Venn Young
1972 election	Venn Young
1975 election	Venn Young
(Electorate abolished 1978; see Waitotara)

== Election results ==
=== 1975 election ===
1975 general election: Egmont
Party	Candidate	Votes	%	±%
National	Venn Young	8,790	53.21	+2.62
Labour	Dennis Duggan	4,670	28.27	
Social Credit	Noel Johnston	2,657	16.08	−1.46
Values	R H Streeton	402	2.43	
Majority		4,120	24.94	+5.14
Turnout		16,519	85.28	−2.23
Registered electors		19,370		

=== 1972 election ===
1972 general election: Egmont
Party	Candidate	Votes	%	±%
National	Venn Young	7,481	50.59	−2.93
Labour	Bob Peck	4,553	30.79	
Social Credit	Noel Johnston	2,594	17.54	−4.21
New Democratic	R A West	111	0.75	
Liberal Reform	D V Tabuteau	47	0.31	
Majority		2,928	19.80	−11.17
Turnout		14,786	87.51	+0.28
Registered electors		16,896		

=== 1969 election ===
1969 general election: Egmont
Party	Candidate	Votes	%	±%
National	Venn Young	7,396	53.52	+4.70
Labour	Tom McGreevy	3,116	22.54	
Social Credit	Noel Johnston	3,007	21.75	−1.70
Country Party	Cliff Emeny	300	2.17	
Majority		4,280	30.97	+5.61
Turnout		13,819	87.23	+0.86
Registered electors		15,842		

=== 1966 election ===
1966 general election: Egmont
Party	Candidate	Votes	%	±%
National	Venn Young	6,279	48.82	
Social Credit	Noel Johnston	3,017	23.45	
Labour	David Vallely	2,560	19.90	
Independent	Frederick William Finer	1,005	7.81	
Majority		3,262	25.36	
Turnout		12,861	86.37	−1.29
Registered electors		14,890		

=== 1963 election ===
1963 general election: Egmont
Party	Candidate	Votes	%	±%
National	William Sheat	7,102	53.39	+0.10
Labour	John Seddon	4,055	30.48	
Social Credit	Winston Smith	2,144	16.11	−1.51
Majority		3,047	22.90	−8.48
Turnout		13,301	87.66	−1.93
Registered electors		15,172		

=== 1960 election ===
1960 general election: Egmont
Party	Candidate	Votes	%	±%
National	William Sheat	7,128	56.87	+3.58
Labour	J W Watson	3,195	25.49	
Social Credit	Winston Smith	2,209	17.62	+3.27
Majority		3,933	31.38	+10.44
Turnout		12,532	89.59	−1.83
Registered electors		13,987		

=== 1957 election ===
1957 general election: Egmont
Party	Candidate	Votes	%	±%
National	William Sheat	6,863	53.29	
Labour	Clarence Robert Parker	4,166	32.35	
Social Credit	Winston Smith	1,848	14.35	+2.61
Majority		2,697	20.94	
Turnout		12,877	91.42	+0.28
Registered electors		14,085		

=== 1954 election ===
1954 general election: Egmont
Party	Candidate	Votes	%	±%
National	Ernest Corbett	6,690	56.75	−13.00
Labour	Roy Evans	3,713	31.49	
Social Credit	Winston Smith	1,385	11.74	
Majority		2,977	25.25	−14.25
Turnout		11,788	91.14	+2.37
Registered electors		12,933		

=== 1951 election ===
1951 General election: Egmont
Party	Candidate	Votes	%	±%
National	Ernest Corbett	8,643	69.75	+2.48
Labour	Brian Edgar Richmond	3,747	30.25	−1.89
Majority		4,896	39.50	+4.38
Turnout		12,390	88.77	−5.55
Registered electors		13,957		

=== 1949 election ===
1949 general election: Egmont
Party	Candidate	Votes	%	±%
National	Ernest Corbett	8,693	67.27	+4.51
Labour	Brian Edgar Richmond	4,154	32.14	
Informal votes		74	0.57	−0.11
Majority		4,539	35.12	+8.91
Turnout		12,921	94.32	−0.88
Registered electors		13,698		

=== 1946 election ===
1946 general election: Egmont
Party	Candidate	Votes	%	±%
National	Ernest Corbett	8,135	62.76	−0.97
Labour	Clarence Robert Parker	4,737	36.54	
Informal votes		89	0.68	−0.66
Majority		3,398	26.21	−2.61
Turnout		12,961	95.20	0.41
Registered electors		13,614		

=== 1943 election ===
1943 general election: Egmont
Party	Candidate	Votes	%	±%
National	Ernest Corbett	5,356	63.73	
Labour	Edwin Thoms Cox	2,934	34.91	
Informal votes		113	1.34	+0.41
Majority		2,422	28.82	
Turnout		8,403	94.79	−0.42
Registered electors		8,864		

=== 1938 election ===
1938 general election: Egmont
Party	Candidate	Votes	%	±%
Independent	Charles Wilkinson	5,063	57.49	−11.55
Labour	Thomas Trask	3,661	41.57	
Informal votes		82	0.93	−0.22
Majority		1,402	15.92	−23.31
Turnout		8,806	95.21	+7.68
Registered electors		9,249		

=== 1935 election ===
1935 general election: Egmont
Party	Candidate	Votes	%	±%
Independent	Charles Wilkinson	5,582	69.04	+10.33
Labour	James Ross	2,410	29.80	
Informal votes		93	1.15	+0.79
Majority		3,172	39.23	+21.81
Turnout		8,085	87.53	−7.68
Registered electors		9,236		

=== 1931 election ===
1931 general election: Egmont
Party	Candidate	Votes	%	±%
Independent	Charles Wilkinson	4,409	58.71	+0.54
Reform	Frederick Gawith	3,101	41.29	
Informal votes		27	0.36	−0.33
Majority		1,308	17.42	
Turnout		7,537	85.71	−5.75
Registered electors		8,794		

=== 1928 election ===
1928 general election: Egmont
Party	Candidate	Votes	%	±%
Independent	Charles Wilkinson	4,577	58.17	
Reform	Oswald Hawken	3,291	41.83	−16.99
Informal votes		55	0.69	−0.23
Majority		1,286	16.34	−2.23
Turnout		7,923	91.46	−0.24
Registered electors		8,663		

=== 1925 election ===
1925 general election: Egmont
Party	Candidate	Votes	%	±%
Reform	Oswald Hawken	4,086	58.82	+6.41
Liberal	Walter Green	2,796	40.25	
Informal votes		64	0.92	+0.34
Majority		1,290	18.57	+13.15
Turnout		6,946	91.70	−0.38
Registered electors		7,574		

=== 1922 election ===
1922 general election: Egmont
Party	Candidate	Votes	%	±%
Reform	Oswald Hawken	3,597	52.41	+1.25
Liberal	David Astbury	3,225	46.99	−1.04
Informal votes		40	0.58	+0.18
Majority		372	5.42	+2.30
Turnout		6,862	92.08	+10.46
Registered electors		7,452		

=== 1919 election ===
1919 general election: Egmont
Party	Candidate	Votes	%	±%
Reform	Oswald Hawken	3,123	51.16	
Liberal	David Astbury	2,932	48.03	+5.82
Informal votes		49	0.80	−0.05
Majority		191	3.12	
Turnout		6,104	81.62	−7.56
Registered electors		7,478		

=== 1914 election ===
1914 general election: Egmont
Party	Candidate	Votes	%	±%
Reform	Charles Wilkinson	3,317	57.78	+1.92
Liberal	David Astbury	2,423	42.21	−1.70
Informal votes		49	0.85	+0.63
Majority		894	15.57	+3.63
Turnout		5,740	89.18	+9.68
Registered electors		6,436		

=== 1912 by-election ===
1912 Egmont by-election
Party	Candidate	Votes	%	±%
Reform	Charles Wilkinson	2,721	55.86	
Liberal	David Astbury	2,139	43.91	
Informal votes		11	0.22	−0.87
Majority		582	11.94	
Turnout		4,871	79.50	−6.74
Registered electors		6,127		
Reform gain from Liberal		Swing		

=== 1911 election ===
1911 general election: Egmont
Party	Candidate	Votes	%	±%
Liberal	Thomas Mackenzie	3,009	52.29	
Reform	Bradshaw Dive	2,682	46.61	−5.77
Informal votes		63	1.09	0.44
Majority		327	5.68	
Turnout		5,754	86.24	+6.70
Registered electors		6,672		

=== 1908 election ===
1908 general election: Egmont
Party	Candidate	Votes	%	±%
Conservative	Bradshaw Dive	2,408	52.38	
Liberal	George Wake	2,159	46.96	
Informal votes		30	0.65	−1.44
Majority		249	5.41	
Turnout		4,597	79.54	+0.96
Registered electors		5,779		

=== 1905 election ===
1905 general election: Egmont
Party	Candidate	Votes	%	±%
Liberal	Bill Jennings	2,621	53.39	+3.18
Independent Liberal	Charles Leech	1,970	40.13	−9.65
Socialist	Harry Campbell	215	4.37	
Informal votes		103	2.09	
Majority		651	13.26	−12.84
Turnout		4,909	78.58	+8.34
Registered electors		6,247		

=== 1902 election ===
1902 general election: Egmont
Party	Candidate	Votes	%	±%
Liberal	Bill Jennings	1,765	50.21	
Independent Liberal	Charles Leech	1,750	49.78	
Majority		15	0.42	
Turnout		3,515	70.24	−6.47
Registered electors		5,004		

=== 1899 election ===
1899 general election: Egmont
Party	Candidate	Votes	%	±%
Liberal	Walter Symes	2,253	53.16	+9.16
Conservative	William Monkhouse	1,985	46.84	+11.56
Majority		268	6.32	−2.40
Turnout		4,238	76.71	
Registered electors		5,525		

=== 1896 election ===
1896 general election: Egmont
Party	Candidate	Votes	%	±%
Liberal	Walter Symes	1,362	44.00	
Conservative	William Monkhouse	1,092	35.28	
Conservative	Joseph Harkness	641	20.71	
Majority		270	8.72	
Turnout		3,095		

=== 1893 election ===
1893 general election: Egmont
Party	Candidate	Votes	%	±%
Independent	Felix McGuire	1,305	48.88	
Conservative	Benjamin Robbins	1,170	43.82	
Liberal	Edgar George Allsworth	195	7.30	
Majority		135	5.06	
Turnout		2,670	72.81	
Registered electors		3,667		

=== 1891 by-election ===
1891 Egmont by-election
Party	Candidate	Votes	%	±%
Independent	Felix McGuire	986	51.92	+10.00
Conservative	Robert Bruce	913	48.04	
Majority		73	3.84	
Turnout		1,899	71.17	+0.45
Registered electors		2,668		

=== 1890 election ===
1890 general election: Egmont
Party	Candidate	Votes	%	±%
Conservative	Harry Atkinson	1,096	58.08	
Independent	Felix McGuire	791	41.92	
Majority		305	16.16	
Turnout		1,887	70.72	
Registered electors		2,668		
