= 1912 Egmont by-election =

New Zealand by-election

The Egmont by-election of 1912 was a by-election held during the 18th New Zealand Parliament in the electorate of Egmont. The seat became vacant due to the resignation of Thomas Mackenzie after the fall of his government. The by-election was held on 17 September and was won by Charles Wilkinson.

== Results ==
The following table gives the election results:

1912 Egmont by-election
Party	Candidate	Votes	%	±%
Reform	Charles Wilkinson	2,721	55.9	
Liberal	David Lyon Abbott Astbury	2,139	43.9	
Informal votes		11	0.20	
Majority		582	12.0	
Turnout		4,871		
Reform gain from Liberal		Swing		
