= 1884 Thorndon by-election =

New Zealand by-election

The 1884 Thorndon by-election was a by-election held on 13 May 1884 for the Wellington urban electorate of Thorndon during the 8th Parliament.

Wellington businessman William Levin resigned due to ill-health.

He was replaced by Dr Alfred Newman.

One of the losing candidates, Henry Bunny had represented the Wairarapa electorate from 1865 to 1881. He was widely expected to win.

Thomas Dwan did not impress one reporter at the opening meeting of the campaign, saying that he did not give his usual "political mountebank" speech but a deadly dull one, and that he showed he knew as much about the country districts as a "Hindoo does about skating".

== Results ==
The following table gives the election results:

1884 Thorndon by-election
Party	Candidate	Votes	%	±%
Independent	Alfred Newman	636	55.99	
Independent	Henry Bunny	379	33.36	
Independent	Thomas Dwan	121	10.65	
Majority		257	22.62	
Turnout		1136		
