= Charles Wilkinson (New Zealand politician) =

New Zealand politician

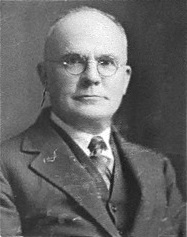
Wilkinson in 1935.

Charles Anderson Wilkinson CBE (19 July 1868 – 3 November 1956) was a New Zealand Reform Party, then independent member of Parliament for Egmont, in the North Island. He also served as mayor of Eltham from 1941 to 1947.

== Member of Parliament ==
New Zealand Parliament
Years	Term	Electorate	Party
1912–1914	18th	Egmont	Reform
1914–1919	19th	Egmont	Reform
1928–1931	23rd	Egmont	Independent
1931–1935	24th	Egmont	Independent
1935–1938	25th	Egmont	Independent
1938–1943	26th	Egmont	Independent

Wilkinson represented the Egmont electorate in the New Zealand House of Representatives from a 1912 by-election to 1919 (when he retired) and then again between 1928 and 1943.

Wilkinson was a Reform MP between 1912–1919 and an independent from 1928 to 1943 In 1935 and 1938 he was not opposed by National, and he habitually voted with National. He was briefly involved with the National Party, but after he lost its first leadership vote by one vote against Adam Hamilton, he continued to represent the Egmont electorate as an independent.

In 1935, he was awarded the King George V Silver Jubilee Medal. In the 1951 New Year Honours, Wilkinson was appointed a Commander of the Order of the British Empire for public services.

New Zealand Parliament
Preceded by Thomas Mackenzie	Member of Parliament for Egmont; 1912–1919; 1928–1943	Succeeded by Oswald Hawken
Preceded by Oswald Hawken	Member of Parliament for Egmont; 1912–1919; 1928–1943	Succeeded by Ernest Corbett
