= 9th New Zealand Parliament =

Term of the Parliament of New Zealand

9th Parliament of New Zealand
←	8th Parliament	10th Parliament	→

Overview
- Legislative body: New Zealand Parliament
- Term: 7 August 1884 – 10 June 1887
- Election: 1884 New Zealand general election
- Government: Stout-Vogel Ministry

House of Representatives
- Members: 95
- Speaker of the House: Maurice O'Rorke
- Premier: Robert Stout

Legislative Council
- Members: 47 (at start); 49 (at end)
- Speaker of the Council: William Fitzherbert

Sovereign
- Monarch: HM Victoria
- Governor: HE Lt. Gen. Sir William Jervois

The 9th New Zealand Parliament was a term of the Parliament of New Zealand.

Elections for this term were held in 4 Māori electorates and 91 general electorates on 21 and 22 July 1884, respectively. A total of 95 MPs were elected. Parliament was prorogued in July 1887. During the term of this Parliament, four Ministries were in power.

== Sessions ==
The 9th Parliament opened on 7 August 1884, following the 1884 general election. It sat for four sessions, and was prorogued on 15 July 1887.

Session	Opened	Adjourned
first	7 August 1884	10 November 1884
second	11 June 1885	22 September 1885
third	13 May 1886	18 August 1886
fourth	26 April 1887	10 June 1887

== Historical context ==
Political parties had not been established yet; this only happened after the 1890 election. Anyone attempting to form an administration thus had to win support directly from individual MPs. This made first forming, and then retaining a government difficult and challenging.

== Ministries ==
The second Atkinson Ministry had been in power since 25 September 1883. This Ministry finished on 16 August 1884, just after the 1884 general election for the 9th Parliament. It was succeeded by the short-lived first Stout-Vogel Ministry, which lasted only twelve days until 28 August 1884. It was followed by an equally short third Atkinson Ministry, which folded on 3 September 1884. The second Stout-Vogel Ministry lasted to 8 October 1887, just after the 1887 general election to determine the composition of the 10th Parliament.

== Electorates ==
The same 95 electorates that were defined through the 1881 electoral redistribution were used for the 1884 election. The next electoral redistribution was held in 1887 in preparation for the 1887 election.

== Initial composition of the 9th Parliament ==
95 seats were created across the electorates. The following table shows the results of the 1884 general election.

Electorate incumbent	Elected member defeated candidates	MP's term
Bay of Islands; Held by R Hobbs	Richard Hobbs	Third
Bay of Islands; Held by R Hobbs	2nd: M Gannon; 3rd: F MacKenzie	Third
Marsden; Held by E Mitchelson	Edwin Mitchelson	Second
Marsden; Held by E Mitchelson	Unopposed	Second
Rodney; Held by S George	William Moat	First
Rodney; Held by S George	2nd: N Wilson	First
Waitemata; Held by W Hurst	William Hurst	Third
Waitemata; Held by W Hurst	2nd: A Farnell	Third
Auckland North; Held by T Peacock	Thomas Thompson	First
Auckland North; Held by T Peacock	2nd:J Newman	First
Auckland West; Held by J McM Dargaville	Joseph Dargaville	Second
Auckland West; Held by J McM Dargaville	2nd:W Swanson	Second
Auckland East; Held by G Grey	George Grey	Fifth
Auckland East; Held by G Grey	Unopposed	Fifth
Newton; Held by W Swanson	Thomas Peacock	Second
Newton; Held by W Swanson	2nd: C de Lautour	Second
Parnell; Held by FJ Moss	Frederick Moss	Fourth
Parnell; Held by FJ Moss	2nd:ST George	Fourth
Eden; Held by J Tole	Joseph Tole	Fourth
Eden; Held by J Tole	2nd: J O'Neil	Fourth
Manukau; Held by M O'Rorke	Maurice O'Rorke	Seventh
Manukau; Held by M O'Rorke	2nd: F Lawry	Seventh
Franklin North; Held by B Harris	Frank Buckland	First
Franklin North; Held by B Harris	2nd: J Harris	First
Franklin South; Held by E Hamlin	Ebenezer Hamlin	Fourth
Franklin South; Held by E Hamlin	Unopposed	Fourth
Coromandel; Held by A Cadman	Alfred Cadman	Second
Coromandel; Held by A Cadman	2nd: A Brodie	Second
Thames; Held by J Sheehan	William Fraser	First
Thames; Held by J Sheehan	2nd: WJ Speight	First
Waikato; Held by JB Whyte	John Whyte	Third
Waikato; Held by JB Whyte	Unopposed	Third
Waipa; Held by FA Whitaker	Edward Lake	First
Waipa; Held by FA Whitaker	2nd: W Jackson	First
Tauranga; Held by George Morris	GB Morris	Third
Tauranga; Held by George Morris	2nd: W Kelly	Third
East Coast; Held by S Locke	Samuel Locke	Second
East Coast; Held by S Locke	2nd: WL Rees	Second
Napier; Held by J Buchanan	John Ormond	Sixth
Napier; Held by J Buchanan	2nd: J Sheehan	Sixth
Hawkes Bay; Held by F Sutton	William Russell	Third
Hawkes Bay; Held by F Sutton	2nd: F Sutton; 3rd: A Desmond	Third
Waipawa; Held by WC Smith	William Smith	Second
Waipawa; Held by WC Smith	2nd:T Tanner	Second
Rangitikei; Held by J Stevens	Robert Bruce	First
Rangitikei; Held by J Stevens	2nd: J Stevens	First
Manawatu; Held by WW Johnston	Douglas Macarthur	First
Manawatu; Held by WW Johnston	2nd: D Frazer; 3rd: A Burr	First
Waitotara; Held by J Bryce	John Bryce	Sixth
Waitotara; Held by J Bryce	2nd: T McDonnell	Sixth
Wanganui; Held by WH Watt	John Ballance	Fourth
Wanganui; Held by WH Watt	2nd: J Hutchinson; 3rd: WH Watt	Fourth
New Plymouth; Held by T Kelly	Oliver Samuel	First
New Plymouth; Held by T Kelly	2nd: EM Smith; 3rd: T Kelly; 4th: C Brown	First
Taranaki; Held by R Trimble	Robert Trimble	Third
Taranaki; Held by R Trimble	2nd: T Bayly; 3rd: J Colesby	Third
Egmont; Held by HA Atkinson	Harry Atkinson	Seventh
Egmont; Held by HA Atkinson	2nd: AA Fantham	Seventh
Foxton; Held by J Wilson	James Wilson	Second
Foxton; Held by J Wilson	2nd: CB Izard; 3rd: JR Browne	Second
Hutt; Held by T Mason	Henry Fitzherbert	First
Hutt; Held by T Mason	2nd: T Mason	First
Wairarapa North; Held by G Beetham	George Beetham	Fourth
Wairarapa North; Held by G Beetham	2nd: William Wilson McCardle	Fourth
Wairarapa South; Held by WC Buchanan	Walter Buchanan	Second
Wairarapa South; Held by WC Buchanan	2nd: H Bunny	Second
Thorndon; Held by W Levin	Alfred Newman	Second
Thorndon; Held by W Levin	Unopposed	Second
Te Aro; Held by CJ Johnston	Charles Johnston	Second
Te Aro; Held by CJ Johnston	2nd: FH Fraser; 3rd: E Shaw; 4th: JH Shaw; 5th: J O'Shea	Second
Wellington South; Held by W Hutchinson	George Fisher	First
Wellington South; Held by W Hutchinson	2nd: W Hutchinson	First
Picton; Held by E Connolly	Edward Connolly	Second
Picton; Held by E Connolly	2nd: WH Eyes	Second
Nelson; Held by H Levestam	Henry Levestam	Third
Nelson; Held by H Levestam	2nd: J Piper	Third
Motueka; Held by R Hursthouse	Richmond Hursthouse	Fourth
Motueka; Held by R Hursthouse	2nd: J Kerr	Fourth
Waimea; Held by J Shephard	Joseph Shephard	Fourth
Waimea; Held by J Shephard	2nd: W Wastney	Fourth
Wairau; Held by H Dodson	Henry Dodson	Second
Wairau; Held by H Dodson	2nd: J Ward	Second
Buller; Held by J Munro	Eugene O'Conor	Second
Buller; Held by J Munro	2nd: J Munro	Second
Inangahua; Held by E Shaw	Andrew Menteath	First
Inangahua; Held by E Shaw	2nd: RHJ Reeves	First
Greymouth; Held by J Petrie	Arthur Guinness	First
Greymouth; Held by J Petrie	2nd: J Petrie	First
Cheviot; Held by H McIlraith	James Lance	First
Cheviot; Held by H McIlraith	2nd: W Gibson; 3rd: GM Adams	First
Kumara; Held by R Seddon	Richard Seddon	Third
Kumara; Held by R Seddon	2nd: E Blake	Third
Hokitika; Held by GG Fitzgerald	John Bevan	First
Hokitika; Held by GG Fitzgerald	2nd: GG Fitzgerald; 3rd: J Clarke	First
Ashley; Held by WF Pearson	William Pearson	Second
Ashley; Held by WF Pearson	2nd: P Duncan	Second
Kaiapoi; Held by E Richardson	Edward Richardson	Fifth
Kaiapoi; Held by E Richardson	Unopposed	Fifth
Avon; Held by W Rolleston	Leonard Harper	Second
Avon; Held by W Rolleston	2nd: W Dunlop; 3rd: Williams	Second
St Albans; Held By JE Brown	Francis Garrick	First
St Albans; Held By JE Brown	2nd: J Jebson; 3rd: T Cooper	First
Stanmore; Held by WH Pilliet	Dan Reese	First
Stanmore; Held by WH Pilliet	2nd: G Rudenklau; 3rd: G Dorney; 4th: WH Pilliet; 5th: O Wansey	First
Sydenham; Held by W White	William White	Second
Sydenham; Held by W White	2nd: John Lee Scott	Second
Christchurch North; Held by H Thomson	Julius Vogel	Fifth
Christchurch North; Held by H Thomson	2nd: John Crewes	Fifth
Christchurch South; Held by J Holmes	John Holmes	Second
Christchurch South; Held by J Holmes	2nd: Thomas Joynt	Second
Heathcote; Held by W Wynn-Williams	John Coster	First
Heathcote; Held by W Wynn-Williams	2nd: Henry Wynn-Williams; 3rd: James Temple Fisher	First
Lyttelton; Held by H Allwright	Harry Allwright	Third
Lyttelton; Held by H Allwright	2nd: SR Webb; 3rd: EM Clissold	Third
Akaroa; Held by W Montgomery	William Montgomery	Fifth
Akaroa; Held by W Montgomery	2nd: FA Anson	Fifth
Lincoln; Held by AP O'Callaghan	Arthur O'Callaghan	Second
Lincoln; Held by AP O'Callaghan	2nd: A Saunders	Second
Coleridge; Held by D McMillan	David McMillan	Second
Coleridge; Held by D McMillan	2nd: J Jebson; 3rd: R Tosswill; 4th: C Frazer	Second
Selwyn; Held by E Wakefield	Edward Wakefield	Fourth
Selwyn; Held by E Wakefield	Unopposed	Fourth
Ashburton; Held by EG Wright	William Walker	First
Ashburton; Held by EG Wright	2nd: JC Wason; 3rd: SC Jolly; 4th: JRCC Graham	First
Wakanui; Held by J Ivess	John Grigg	First
Wakanui; Held by J Ivess	2nd: J Ivess; 3rd: P McQuire	First
Geraldine; Held by W Postlethwaite	William Rolleston	Sixth
Geraldine; Held by W Postlethwaite	2nd: Alfred Cox; 3rd: Francis Franks	Sixth
Timaru; Held by R Turnbull	Richard Turnbull	Fourth
Timaru; Held by R Turnbull	2nd: EG Kerr	Fourth
Gladstone; Held by JH Sutter	James Sutter	Second
Gladstone; Held by JH Sutter	2nd: D Anderson; 3rd: JM Twomey; 4th: G Morris	Second
Waimate; Held by WJ Steward	William Steward	Third
Waimate; Held by WJ Steward	2nd: A Haynes; 3rd: WJ Black	Third
Waitaki; Held by TY Duncan	Thomas Duncan	Second
Waitaki; Held by TY Duncan	2nd: D Sutherland; 3rd: T Ferens	Second
Oamaru; Held by SE Shrimski	Samuel Shrimski	Fourth
Oamaru; Held by SE Shrimski	2nd: Viscount Reidhaven	Fourth
Moeraki; Held by J McKenzie	John McKenzie	Second
Moeraki; Held by J McKenzie	2nd: Charles Haynes	Second
Waikouaiti; Held by J Green	John Buckland	First
Waikouaiti; Held by J Green	2nd: J Green; 3rd: J Arkle	First
Port Chalmers; Held by J Macandrew	James Macandrew	Ninth
Port Chalmers; Held by J Macandrew	Unopposed	Ninth
Roslyn; Held by J Bathgate	Archibald Ross	First
Roslyn; Held by J Bathgate	2nd: J Bathgate	First
Dunedin West; Held by T Dick	William Stewart	Third
Dunedin West; Held by T Dick	2nd: T Dick	Third
Dunedin East; Held by MW Green	Robert Stout	Third
Dunedin East; Held by MW Green	2nd: MW Green	Third
Dunedin Central; Held by T Bracken	James Bradsheigh-Bradshaw	Third
Dunedin Central; Held by T Bracken	2nd: T Bracken; 3rd: JGS Grant	Third
Dunedin South; Held by HS Fish	James Gore	First
Dunedin South; Held by HS Fish	2nd: Henry Fish	First
Peninsula; Held by WJM Larnach	William Larnach	Third
Peninsula; Held by WJM Larnach	2nd: Owen James Hodge; 3rd: John Wells	Third
Caversham; Held by W Barron	William Barron	Third
Caversham; Held by W Barron	Unopposed	Third
Taieri; Held by J Fulton	James Fulton	Third
Taieri; Held by J Fulton	2nd: WCF Carncross; 3rd: WAW Wathen	Third
Mount Ida; Held by CA de Lautour	Scobie Mackenzie	First
Mount Ida; Held by CA de Lautour	2nd: J Ewing	First
Dunstan; Held by V Pyke	Vincent Pyke	Fifth
Dunstan; Held by V Pyke	Unopposed	Fifth
Bruce; Held by J McDonald	Robert Gillies	First
Bruce; Held by J McDonald	2nd: H Driver; 3rd: J McDonald	First
Tuapeka; Held by JC Brown	James Brown	Sixth
Tuapeka; Held by JC Brown	2nd: F Oudaille	Sixth
Clutha; Held by JW Thomson	James Thomson	Fifth
Clutha; Held by JW Thomson	Unopposed	Fifth
Mataura; Held by FW Mackenzie	George Richardson	First
Mataura; Held by FW Mackenzie	2nd: FW Mackenzie	First
Awarua; Held by JP Joyce	James Joyce	Third
Awarua; Held by JP Joyce	2nd: JL McDonald; 3rd: A Kinross; 4th: JW Mitchell; 5th: T Hodgkinson	Third
Invercargill; Held by H Feldwick	Joseph Hatch	First
Invercargill; Held by H Feldwick	2nd: H Feldwick; 3rd: G Lumsden	First
Wakatipu; Held by T Fergus	Thomas Fergus	Second
Wakatipu; Held by T Fergus	2nd: JT Hornsby; 3rd: SN Brown	Second
Hokonui; Held by H Driver	Cuthbert Cowan	Second
Hokonui; Held by H Driver	2nd: Frank Stephen Canning; 3rd: Justus Hobbs; 4th: Thomas James Lumsden	Second
Wallace; Held by T Daniel	Henry Hirst	Second
Wallace; Held by T Daniel	2nd: S Hodgkinson; 3rd: T Daniel; 4th: M Hayes	Second
Northern Maori; Held by H Tawhai	Ihaka Hakuene	First
Eastern Maori; Held by H Tomana	Wi Pere	First
Western Maori; Held by W Te Wheoro	Te Puke Te Ao	First
Western Maori; Held by W Te Wheoro	2nd: Te Keepa Te Rangihiwinui see results for six more candidates	First
Southern Maori; Held by HK Taiaroa	Hōri Kerei Taiaroa	Fifth

== Changes during term ==
There were a number of changes during the term of the 9th Parliament.

By-election	Electorate	Date	Incumbent	Reason	Winner
1885	Oamaru	20 May	Samuel Shrimski	Resignation	Thomas William Hislop
1885 (1st)	Tauranga	22 May	George Morris	Resignation	John Sheehan
1885	Waimea	3 June	Joseph Shephard	Resignation	John Kerr
1885	Southern Maori	10 June	Hōri Kerei Taiaroa	Resignation	Tame Parata
1885	Wakanui	6 July	John Grigg	Resignation	Joseph Ivess
1885 (2nd)	Tauranga	11 July	John Sheehan	Death	Lawrence Grace
1885	Bruce	5 August	Robert Gillies	Resignation	Donald Reid
1886	Sydenham	12 May	William White	Resignation	Richard Taylor
1886	Dunedin Central	19 October	James Bradshaw	Death	Thomas Bracken
1886	Waitemata	11 December	William Hurst	Death	Richard Monk
1886	Western Maori	23 December	Te Puke Te Ao	Death	Hoani Taipua
1887	Heathcote	8 February	John Coster	Death	Frederic Jones
1887	Port Chalmers	6 April	James Macandrew	Death	James Mills
1887	Te Aro	15 April	Charles Johnston	Resignation	Francis Fraser
1887	Northern Maori	9 May	Ihaka Hakuene	Death	Wi Katene
1887	Avon	1 June	Leonard Harper	Resignation	Edwin Blake
