= 8th New Zealand Parliament =

Parliamentary term

8th Parliament of New Zealand
←	7th Parliament	9th Parliament	→

Overview
- Legislative body: New Zealand Parliament
- Term: 18 May 1882 – 24 June 1884
- Election: 1881 New Zealand general election
- Government: Hall ministry (until 1882); Whitaker ministry (1882 - 1883); Third Atkinson ministry (from 1883)

House of Representatives
- Members: 95
- Speaker of the House: Maurice O'Rorke
- Premier: Harry Atkinson — from 25 September 1883 John Hall — until 21 April 1882

Legislative Council
- Members: 47 (at start); 49 (at end)
- Speaker of the Council: William Fitzherbert
- Premier: Frederick Whitaker — 21 April 1882 – 25 September 1883

Sovereign
- Monarch: HM Victoria
- Governor: HE Lt. Gen. Sir William Jervois from 20 January 1883 — HE Rt. Hon. Sir Arthur Hamilton-Gordon until 24 June 1882

The 8th New Zealand Parliament was a term of the New Zealand Parliament.

Elections for this term were held in 4 Māori electorates and 91 general electorates on 8 and 9 December 1881, respectively. A total of 95 MPs were elected, i.e. multi-member electorates were no longer used. Parliament was prorogued in June 1884. During the term of this Parliament, three Ministries were in power.

== Sessions ==
The 8th Parliament opened on 18 May 1882, following the 1881 general election. It sat for three sessions, and was prorogued on 27 June 1884.

Session	Opened	Adjourned
first	18 May 1882	15 September 1882
second	14 June 1883	8 September 1883
third	5 June 1884	24 June 1884

== Historical context ==
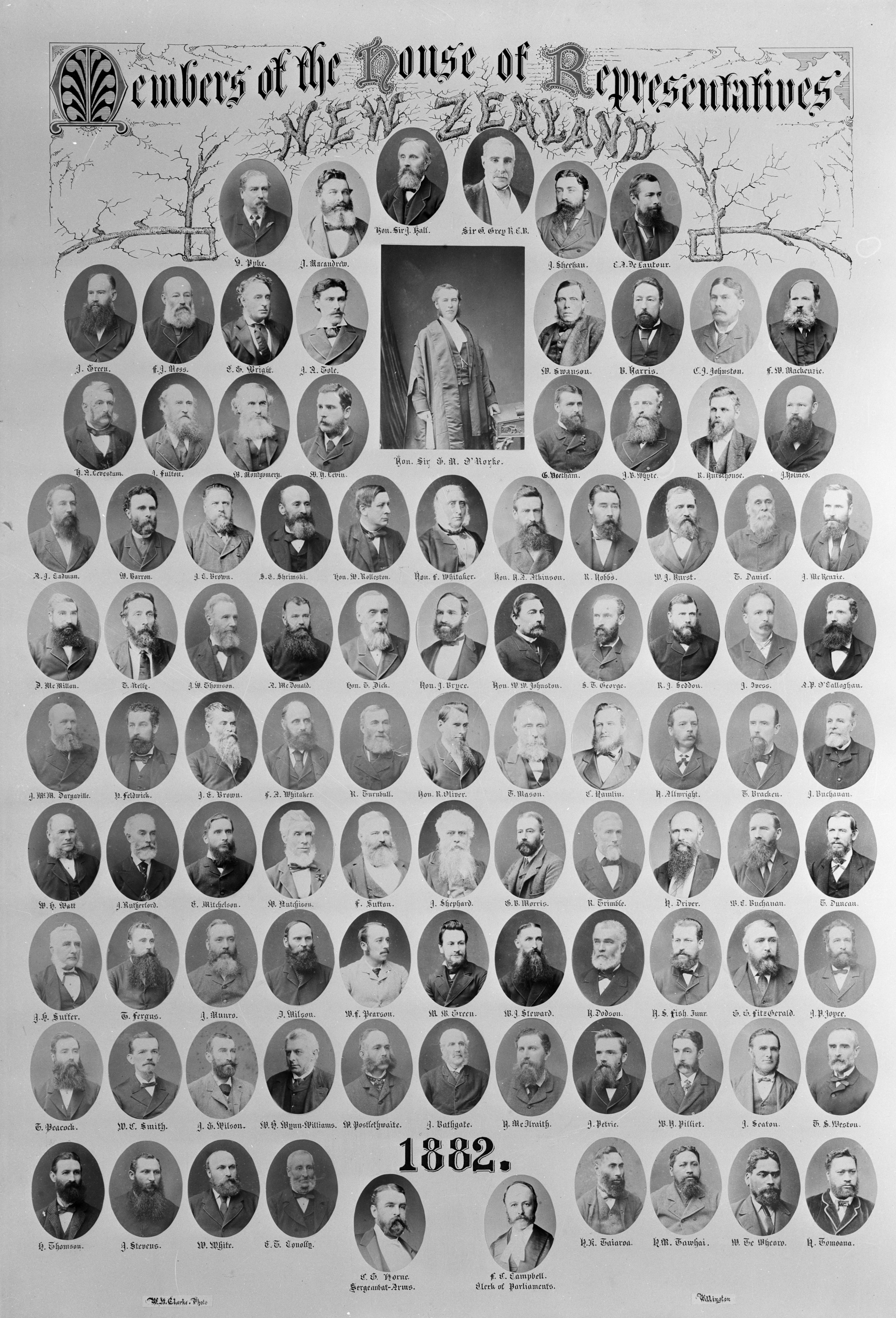
Portraits depicting members of the 1882 House of Representatives.

Political parties had not been established yet; this only happened after the 1890 election. Anyone attempting to form an administration thus had to win support directly from individual MPs. This made first forming, and then retaining a government difficult and challenging.

== Ministries ==
The Hall Ministry under Premier John Hall had been in power since 8 October 1879. This ministry lasted until 21 April 1882. It was succeeded by the Whitaker Ministry, which lasted until 25 September 1883. The second Atkinson Ministry succeeded it. This Ministry finished on 16 August 1884, just after the 1884 general election for the 9th Parliament.

== Electorates ==
Ninety-one general and four Māori electorates were used for the 1881 elections, i.e. the previous multi-member electorates were abolished. The changes were the result of the Representation Act 1881. The previous electoral redistribution was undertaken in 1875 for the 1875–1876 election. In the six years since, New Zealand's European population had increased by 65%. In the 1881 electoral redistribution, the House of Representatives increased the number of European representatives to 91 (up from 84 since the 1875–76 election). The number of Māori electorates was held at four. The House further decided that electorates should not have more than one representative, which led to 35 new electorates being formed: Ashburton, Auckland North, Awarua, Christchurch North, Christchurch South, Coromandel, Dunedin Central, Dunedin East, Dunedin South, Dunedin West, Foxton, Franklin North, Franklin South, Hawke's Bay, Hokonui, Inangahua, Kumara, Lincoln, Manukau, Moeraki, Peninsula, St Albans, Stanmore, Sydenham, Taranaki, Tauranga, Te Aro, Thorndon, Waimate, Waipawa, Wairarapa North, Wairarapa South, Waitotara, Wakanui, and Wellington South. In addition, two electorates that had previously been abolished were recreated: Bay of Islands and Oamaru.

These changes necessitated a major disruption to existing boundaries. Only six electorates remained unchanged: Waikato, Waipa, Bruce, Lyttelton, Nelson, and Picton.

== Initial composition of the 8th Parliament ==
95 seats were created across the electorates. The following table shows the successful candidate for each electorate.

Member	Electorate	Affiliation	MP's term
William Montgomery	Akaroa	Greyite	Fourth
Edward George Wright	Ashburton	Greyite	Second
William Fisher Pearson	Ashley	Greyite	First
George Grey	Auckland East	Greyite	Fourth
Thomas Peacock	Auckland North	Independent	First
Joseph Dargaville	Auckland West	Independent	First
William Rolleston	Avon	Conservative	Fifth
James Parker Joyce	Awarua	Greyite	Second
Richard Hobbs	Bay of Islands	Conservative	Second
James Rutherford	Bruce	Independent	First
John Munro	Buller	Independent Liberal	First
William Barron	Caversham	Greyite	Second
Hugh McIlraith	Cheviot	Conservative	First
Henry Thomson	Christchurch North	Conservative	First
John Holmes	Christchurch South	Greyite	First
James William Thomson	Clutha	Conservative	Fourth
David McMillan	Coleridge	Conservative	First
Alfred Cadman	Coromandel	Greyite	First
Thomas Bracken	Dunedin Central	Greyite	First
Matthew Green	Dunedin East	Independent	First
Henry Fish	Dunedin South	Independent	First
Thomas Dick	Dunedin West	Conservative	Fourth
Vincent Pyke	Dunstan	Greyite	Fourth
Allan McDonald	East Coast	Greyite	Second
Joseph Tole	Eden	Greyite	Third
Harry Atkinson	Egmont	Conservative	Sixth
James Wilson	Foxton	Conservative	First
Benjamin Harris	Franklin North	Greyite	Second
Ebenezer Hamlin	Franklin South	Greyite	Third
William Postlethwaite	Geraldine	Conservative	First
James Sutter	Gladstone	Independent	First
Joseph Petrie	Greymouth	Conservative	First
Fred Sutton	Hawkes Bay	Conservative	Third
Henry Wynn-Williams	Heathcote	Conservative	First
Gerard George Fitzgerald	Hokitika	Conservative	First
Henry Driver	Hokonui	Conservative	Fifth
Thomas Mason	Hutt	Conservative	Second
Thomas S. Weston	Inangahua	Conservative	Second
Henry Feldwick	Invercargill	Greyite	Second
Isaac Wilson	Kaiapoi	Conservative	First
Richard Seddon	Kumara	Greyite	Second
Arthur O'Callaghan	Lincoln	Conservative	First
Harry Allwright	Lyttelton	Conservative	Second
Walter Johnston	Manawatu	Conservative	Fourth
Maurice O'Rorke	Manukau	Independent	Sixth
Edwin Mitchelson	Marsden	Conservative	First
Francis Wallace Mackenzie	Mataura	Greyite	First
John McKenzie	Moeraki	Greyite	First
Richmond Hursthouse	Motueka	Conservative	Third
Cecil de Lautour	Mount Ida	Greyite	Third
John Buchanan	Napier	Greyite	First
Henry Levestam	Nelson	Greyite	Second
Thomas Kelly	New Plymouth	Conservative	Fifth
William Swanson	Newton	Conservative	Fourth
Samuel Shrimski	Oamaru	Greyite	Third
Frederick Moss	Parnell	Greyite	Third
James Seaton	Peninsula	Greyite	Second
Edward Connoly	Picton	Conservative	First
James Macandrew	Port Chalmers	Greyite	Eighth
John Stevens	Rangitikei	Independent Liberal	First
Seymour Thorne George	Rodney	Greyite	Third
John Bathgate	Roslyn	Greyite	Second
John Hall	Selwyn	Conservative	Fifth
John Evans Brown	St Albans	Greyite	Third
Walter Pilliet	Stanmore	Conservative	First
William White	Sydenham	Greyite	First
James Fulton	Taieri	Conservative	Second
Robert Trimble	Taranaki	Conservative	Second
George Morris	Tauranga	Conservative	Second
Charles John Johnston	Te Aro	Conservative	First
John Sheehan	Thames	Independent	Fourth
William Levin	Thorndon	Conservative	Second
Richard Turnbull	Timaru	Greyite	Third
James Clark Brown	Tuapeka	Greyite	Fifth
John Blair Whyte	Waikato	Conservative	Second
James Green	Waikouaiti	Conservative	Second
William Steward	Waimate	Conservative	Second
Joseph Shephard	Waimea	Greyite	Third
Frederick Alexander Whitaker	Waipa	Conservative	Second
William Cowper Smith	Waipawa	Independent Liberal	First
George Beetham	Wairarapa North	Conservative	Third
Walter Clarke Buchanan	Wairarapa South	Conservative	First
Henry Dodson	Wairau	Greyite	First
Thomas Young Duncan	Waitaki	Greyite	First
William John Hurst	Waitemata	Conservative	Second
John Bryce	Waitotara	Conservative	Fifth
Cathcart Wason	Wakanui	Conservative	Second
Thomas Fergus	Wakatipu	Conservative	First
Theophilus Daniel	Wallace	Greyite	First
William Hogg Watt	Wanganui	Conservative	Second
William Hutchison	Wellington South	Greyite	Second
Henare Tomoana	Eastern Maori	Conservative	Third
Hone Tawhai	Northern Maori	Greyite	Second
Hori Kerei Taiaroa	Southern Maori	Greyite	Fourth
Wiremu Te Wheoro	Western Maori	Greyite	Second

== Changes during term ==
There were a number of changes during the term of the 8th Parliament.

By-election	Electorate	Date	Incumbent	Reason	Winner
1882	Franklin North	9 June	Benjamin Harris	Election declared void	Benjamin Harris
1882	Wakanui	16 June	Cathcart Wason	Election declared void	Joseph Ivess
1882	Stanmore	11 July	Walter Pilliet	Election declared void	Walter Pilliet
1883	Peninsula	22 January	James Seaton	Death	William Larnach
1883	Selwyn	6 April	John Hall	Resignation	Edward Lee
1883	Inangahua	14 May	Thomas S. Weston	Resignation	Edward Shaw
1883	Bruce	29 June	James Rutherford	Death	James McDonald
1884	Selwyn	15 February	Edward Lee	Death	Edward Wakefield
1884	Thorndon	13 May	William Levin	Resignation	Alfred Newman
1884	Kaiapoi	16 May	Isaac Wilson	Resignation	Edward Richardson
1884	East Coast	16 June	Allan McDonald	Resignation	Samuel Locke
