= 1884 New Zealand general election =

1884 general election
- 21 (Māori) & 22 (general) July 1884

All 95 seats in the New Zealand House of Representatives
- Turnout: 60.6%
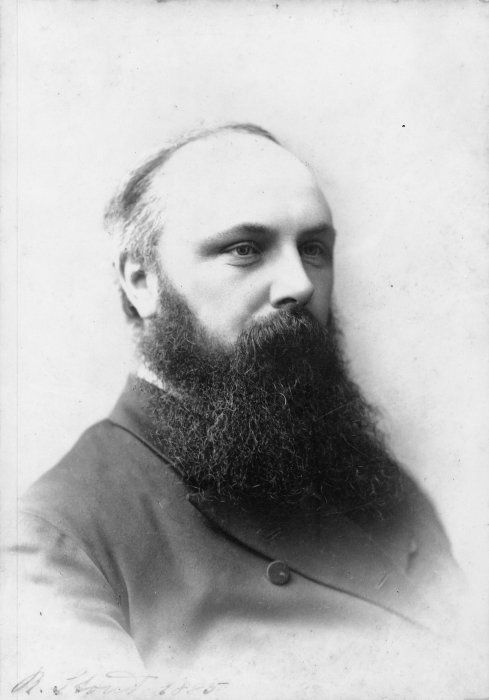

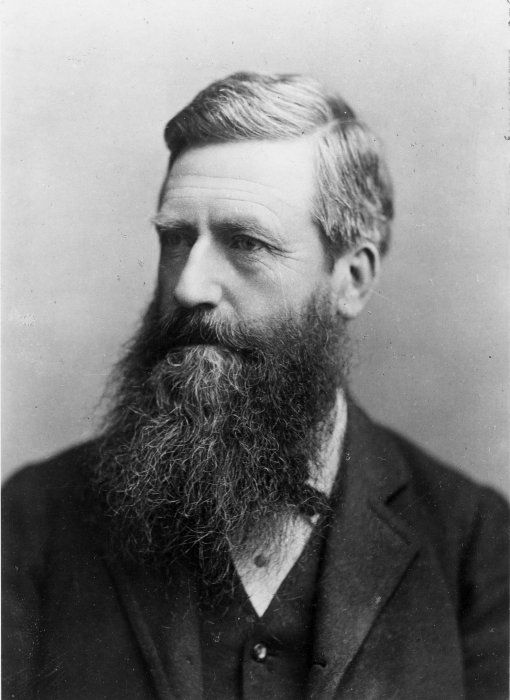
	First party	Second party
Leader	Robert Stout	Harry Atkinson
Party	Stout–Vogelites	Conservatives
Leader since	1884	1883
Leader's seat	Dunedin East	Egmont
Seats won	57	32
Seat change	▲18	▼13
Popular vote	N/A	N/A
Percentage	N/A	N/A
Swing	N/A	N/A
Premier before election
Harry Atkinson
Independent
Subsequent Premier
Robert Stout
Independent

The 1884 New Zealand general election was held on 22 July to elect a total of 95 MPs to the 9th session of the New Zealand Parliament. The Māori vote was held on 21 July. A total number of 137,686 (60.6%) voters turned out to vote. In 11 seats there was only one candidate.

== 1881 electoral redistribution ==
The same 95 electorates that were defined through the 1881 electoral redistribution were used for the 1884 election. The next electoral redistribution was held in 1887 in preparation for the 1887 election.

== Government formation ==
Prior to the election Harry Atkinson had served as Premier since 1883. His government was unpopular at the time and the polls went against him. Only 32 of the returned Members supported him whilst 57 opposed his government as well as 6 independents. Soon after the election his government fell in August 1884 after Robert Stout successfully passed a vote of no confidence and assumed the premiership with the support of Julius Vogel. A strong counter-offensive by Atkinson enabled him to unseat Stout again after only twelve days. Stout, however, was not so easily defeated, and took the Premiership again after seven days. This time, Stout held his position for three years, defeating Atkinson's attempts to oust him.

== Results ==
The following table shows the results of the 1884 general election:

Key to affiliations

Stout-Vogelite Conservative Independent

Note that as the election was held before the establishment of formal political parties, the affiliation should only be regarded as an approximate indication of the division of political opinion.

Electorate results for the 1884 New Zealand general election
Electorate	Incumbent	Winner	Majority	Runner up
General electorates
Akaroa	William Montgomery		295	Frederick Arthur Anson
Ashburton	Edward Wright	William Walker	17	Cathcart Wason
Ashley	William Pearson		328	Peter Duncan
Auckland East	Sir George Grey		Uncontested	
Auckland North	Thomas Peacock	Thomas Thompson	550	Joseph Newman
Auckland West	Joseph Dargaville		53	William Swanson
Avon	William Rolleston	Leonard Harper	89	William Dunlop
Awarua	James Joyce		105	John Lyon McDonald
Bay of Islands	Richard Hobbs		167	Michael Gannon
Bruce	James McDonald	Robert Gillies	217	Henry Driver
Buller	John Munro	Eugene O'Conor	78	John Munro
Caversham	William Barron		Uncontested	
Cheviot	Hugh McIlraith	James Lance	33	Walter Gibson
Christchurch North	Henry Thomson	Sir Julius Vogel	707	John Crewes
Christchurch South	John Holmes		38	Thomas Joynt
Clutha	James Thomson		Uncontested	
Coleridge	David McMillan		148	Joseph Jebson Sr
Coromandel	Alfred Cadman		205	Alexander Brodie
Dunedin Central	Thomas Bracken	James Bradshaw	3	Thomas Bracken
Dunedin East	Matthew Green	Robert Stout	240	Matthew Green
Dunedin South	Henry Fish	James Gore	16	Henry Fish
Dunedin West	Thomas Dick	William Downie Stewart	24	Thomas Dick
Dunstan	Vincent Pyke		Uncontested	
East Coast	Samuel Locke		243	William Lee Rees
Eden	Joseph Tole		394	Allan O'Neil
Egmont	Harry Atkinson		471	Albert A. Fantham
Foxton	James Wilson		12	Charles Izard
Franklin North	Benjamin Harris	Frank Buckland	101	Benjamin Harris
Franklin South	Ebenezer Hamlin		Uncontested	
Geraldine	William Postlethwaite	William Rolleston	70	Alfred Cox
Gladstone	James Sutter		148	David Anderson
Greymouth	Joseph Petrie	Arthur Guinness	238	Joseph Petrie
Hawkes Bay	Fred Sutton	William Russell	183	Fred Sutton
Heathcote	Henry Wynn-Williams	John Coster	200	Henry Wynn-Williams
Hokitika	Gerard Fitzgerald	John Bevan	58	Gerard Fitzgerald
Hokonui	Henry Driver	Cuthbert Cowan	271	Frank Stephen Canning
Hutt	Thomas Mason	Henry Fitzherbert	176	Thomas Mason
Inangahua	Edward Shaw	Stuart Menteath	21	Richard Reeves
Invercargill	Henry Feldwick	Joseph Hatch	157	Henry Feldwick
Kaiapoi	Edward Richardson		Uncontested	
Kumara	Richard Seddon		170	Edwin Blake
Lincoln	Arthur O'Callaghan		3	Alfred Saunders
Lyttelton	Harry Allwright		40	Samuel R. Webb
Manawatu	Walter Johnston	Douglas Macarthur	330	Donald Fraser
Manukau	Maurice O'Rorke		136	Frank Lawry
Marsden	Edwin Mitchelson		Uncontested	
Mataura	Francis Mackenzie	George Richardson	169	Francis Mackenzie
Moeraki	John McKenzie		116	Charles Haynes
Motueka	Richmond Hursthouse		30	John Kerr
Mount Ida	Cecil de Lautour	Scobie Mackenzie	114	John Ewing
Napier	John Buchanan	John Ormond	102	John Sheehan
Nelson	Henry Levestam		372	Jesse Piper
New Plymouth	Thomas Kelly	Oliver Samuel	71	Edward Smith
Newton	William Swanson	Thomas Peacock	124	Cecil de Lautour
Oamaru	Samuel Shrimski		42	Viscount Reidhaven
Parnell	Frederick Moss		108	Seymour George
Peninsula	William Larnach		306	Owen James Hodge
Picton	Edward Connolly		116	William Eyes
Port Chalmers	James Macandrew		Uncontested	
Rangitikei	Jack Stevens	Robert Bruce	103	Jack Stevens
Rodney	Seymour George	William Moat	304	Nathaniel Wilson
Roslyn	John Bathgate	Archibald Ross	77	John Bathgate
Selwyn	Edward Wakefield		Uncontested	
St Albans	John Brown	Francis Garrick	317	Joseph Jebson Jr.
Stanmore	Walter Pilliet	Dan Reese	89	George Ruddenklau
Sydenham	William White		314	John Lee Scott
Taieri	James Fulton		76	Walter Carncross
Taranaki	Robert Trimble		95	Thomas Bayly
Tauranga	George Morris		98	William Kelly
Te Aro	Charles Johnston		11	Francis Fraser
Thames	John Sheehan	William Fraser	7	William Speight
Thorndon	Alfred Newman		Uncontested	
Timaru	Richard Turnbull		168	Edward Kerr
Tuapeka	James Brown		244	Francis Oudaille
Waikato	John Whyte		Uncontested	
Waikouaiti	James Green	John Buckland	58	James Green
Waimate	William Steward		398	Alpheus Hayes
Waimea	Joseph Shephard		148	William Wastney
Waipa	Frederick Whitaker	Edward Lake	38	William Jackson
Waipawa	William Cowper Smith		289	Thomas Tanner
Wairarapa North	George Beetham		25	William McCardle
Wairarapa South	Wally Buchanan		61	Henry Bunny
Wairau	Henry Dodson		237	Joseph Ward
Waitaki	Tom Duncan		173	Duncan Sutherland
Waitemata	William Hurst		474	Harry Farnall
Waitotara	John Bryce		156	Thomas McDonnell
Wakanui	Joseph Ivess	John Grigg	54	Joseph Ivess
Wakatipu	Thomas Fergus		440	JT Hornsby
Wallace	Theophilus Daniel	Henry Hirst	65	Samuel Hodgkinson
Wanganui	William Hogg Watt	John Ballance	336	George Hutchison
Wellington South	William Hutchinson	George Fisher	240	William Hutchinson
Maori electorates (Note: The affiliation of many of the Maori candidates is unknown or uncertain)
Eastern Maori	Henare Tomoana	Wi Pere	23	James Carroll
Northern Maori	Hone Tawhai	Ihaka Hakuene	29	Sydney Taiwhanga
Southern Maori	Hōri Kerei Taiaroa		134	Kahu
Western Maori	Wiremu Te Wheoro	Te Puke Te Ao	72	Te Keepa Te Rangihiwinui

Table footnotes:
