= Daniel Reese (cricketer) =

New Zealand cricketer

Personal information
- Full name: Daniel Whitelaw Reese
- Born: 19 October 1898; Christchurch, New Zealand
- Died: 11 January 1954 (aged 55); Elwood, Melbourne, Australia
- Relatives: Tom Reese (father); Dan Reese (cricketer) (uncle); Daniel Reese (grandfather)

Domestic team information
- Years: Team
- 1917/18–1920/21: Canterbury

Career statistics
Competition	First-class
Matches	6
Runs scored	71
Batting average	6.45
100s/50s	0/0
Top score	27
Balls bowled	96
Wickets	5
Bowling average	10.40
5 wickets in innings	1
10 wickets in match	0
Best bowling	5/33
Catches/stumpings	2/–
- Source: CricketArchive, 27 February 2022

Daniel Whitelaw Reese (19 October 1898 – 11 January 1954) was a New Zealand cricketer. He played six first-class matches for Canterbury between 1917 and 1921.

== Life and career ==
Reese was born in 1898. His parents were Thomas Wilson Reese and Georgina Whitelaw Reese. His uncle, also called Dan Reese, captained the New Zealand cricket team for several years before World War I. Young Daniel attended Christ's College, Christchurch, where he captained the First XI in 1917.

Reese made his first-class debut at the age of 19 in the 1917–18 season. In his second match, later that season, he played in the same Canterbury team as his father, who was playing his last first-class match at the age of 50. His best match was against Otago in 1920–21, when he took 5 for 33 in the second innings and followed up with his highest score, 27.

From 1923, Reese spent time in Australia broadening his business experience. When he returned to New Zealand, he worked as a marine engineer and a businessman with interests in engineering, shipping and timber.

Reese married Dorothy Moreland in Melbourne in January 1926. She died in October 1935. He died suddenly in Melbourne on 11 January 1954, survived by his second wife, Kathleen.
