= Scobie Mackenzie =

New Zealand politician

New Zealand Parliament
Years	Term	Electorate	Party
1884–1887	9th	Mount Ida	Independent
1887–1890	10th	Mount Ida	Independent
1890–1893	11th	Mount Ida	Independent
1896–1899	13th	City of Dunedin	Independent

Mackay John Scobie Mackenzie (23 January 1845 – 15 September 1901), known as Scobie, was an independent conservative Member of Parliament in New Zealand.

== Biography ==
Mackenzie was born in Tain in Scotland in 1845. He moved from Victoria to the Otago region in 1870 to manage the Deepdell sheep station on an invitation by Donald McLean and Matthew Holmes. He married Jessy Adela Bell in 1876, the only daughter of Dillon Bell.

He first stood for the House of Representatives in the 1881 election in the Mount Ida electorate and was only narrowly beaten by the incumbent, Cecil de Lautour. He represented the Mount Ida electorate from 1884 to 1893, when he was defeated for Waihemo. In 1884 he supported the Stout–Vogel Ministry and became the government's Whip. However Mackenzie would later leave the Stout-Vogelites in protest of new tariffs and the notion of female enfranchisement, joining the opposition conservative MPs. In 1894 he came second in the 1894 by-election for Tuapeka.

He then represented the multi-member City of Dunedin electorate from 1896 to 1899 when he was defeated.

Mackenzie died at his home in Dunedin on 15 December 1901, and was buried at Andersons Bay Cemetery.

New Zealand Parliament
Preceded by Cecil de Lautour	Member of Parliament for Mount Ida; 1884–1893	In abeyance Title next held by Alexander Herdman
