= Anne Wilson (poet) =

Australian poet and novelist (1848–1930)

- Born: 11 June 1848; Greenvale, Victoria, Australia
- Died: 11 February 1930 (aged 81); Wanganui, New Zealand
- Writing career
- Pen name: Mrs James Glenny Wilson; Austral
- Genre: Poetry

Anne Wilson, Lady Wilson (née Adams) (11 June 1848 – 11 February 1930) was an Australian poet and novelist. Most of her work was published as Mrs James Glenny Wilson or the pseudonym Austral.

== Biography ==
Adams was born in 1848 at Greenvale, Victoria. Her mother, Jane Anderson, was Scottish, and her father, the farmer Robert Adams, was Irish. She was known as Annie, and she received her education at Geelong High School and at a private institution in St Kilda, Victoria. After her schooling, she travelled through Europe with her mother. On 21 January 1874, she married James Wilson at St Enochs station near Skipton, Victoria. Her husband had bought 6,210 acres (2,510 ha) of land in the Rangitikei District of New Zealand in 1873, and by the end of 1874, the Wilsons were living there. They lived in their homestead, which they called Lethenty, for the rest of their lives, but she always identified with Australia throughout her life. James Wilson, a well-known public man, was knighted in 1915.
