= James Fulton (New Zealand politician) =

New Zealand politician

New Zealand Parliament
Years	Term	Electorate	Party
1879–1881	7th	Taieri	Independent
1881–1884	8th	Taieri	Independent
1884–1887	9th	Taieri	Independent
1887–1890	10th	Taieri	Independent

James Fulton (27 June 1830 – 20 November 1891) was a 19th-century Member of Parliament in Otago, New Zealand and a cricketer.

== Biography ==
James Fulton was born in Bengal, and went to New Zealand in the late 1840s. On 22 September 1852, he married Catherine Valpy, a daughter of one of Dunedin's most prominent and prosperous families. His wife was to become a notable suffragette. They had three sons and three daughters. His two eldest sons, Arthur Fulton (1853–1889) and James Edward Fulton (1854–1928) were prominent civil engineers.

He played five first-class cricket matches for Otago between 1863 and 1868. These were the first five first-class matches played in New Zealand, and scores were very low. He made the top score of the match in the first two matches: 25 not out in the first match, which Otago won, and 22 in the second, which Canterbury won. He captained Otago in three of his matches.

For many years he was resident magistrate at Outram, a small town west of Dunedin, before taking up farming. He represented the Taieri electorate from 1879 to 1890 when he retired. He was one of the commissioners on the Royal Commission into sweated labour in 1890.

He was a member of the New Zealand Legislative Council in 1891, from 22 January to 20 November when he died. He was appointed as one of seven new members (including Harry Atkinson himself) appointed to the council by the outgoing fourth Atkinson Ministry; a move regarded by Liberals as a stacking of the upper house against the new government.

== Notes ==
New Zealand Parliament
Preceded by William Cutten	Member of Parliament for Taieri; 1879–1890	Succeeded by Walter Carncross
