= Edward Conolly (judge) =

New Zealand lawyer, politician and judge

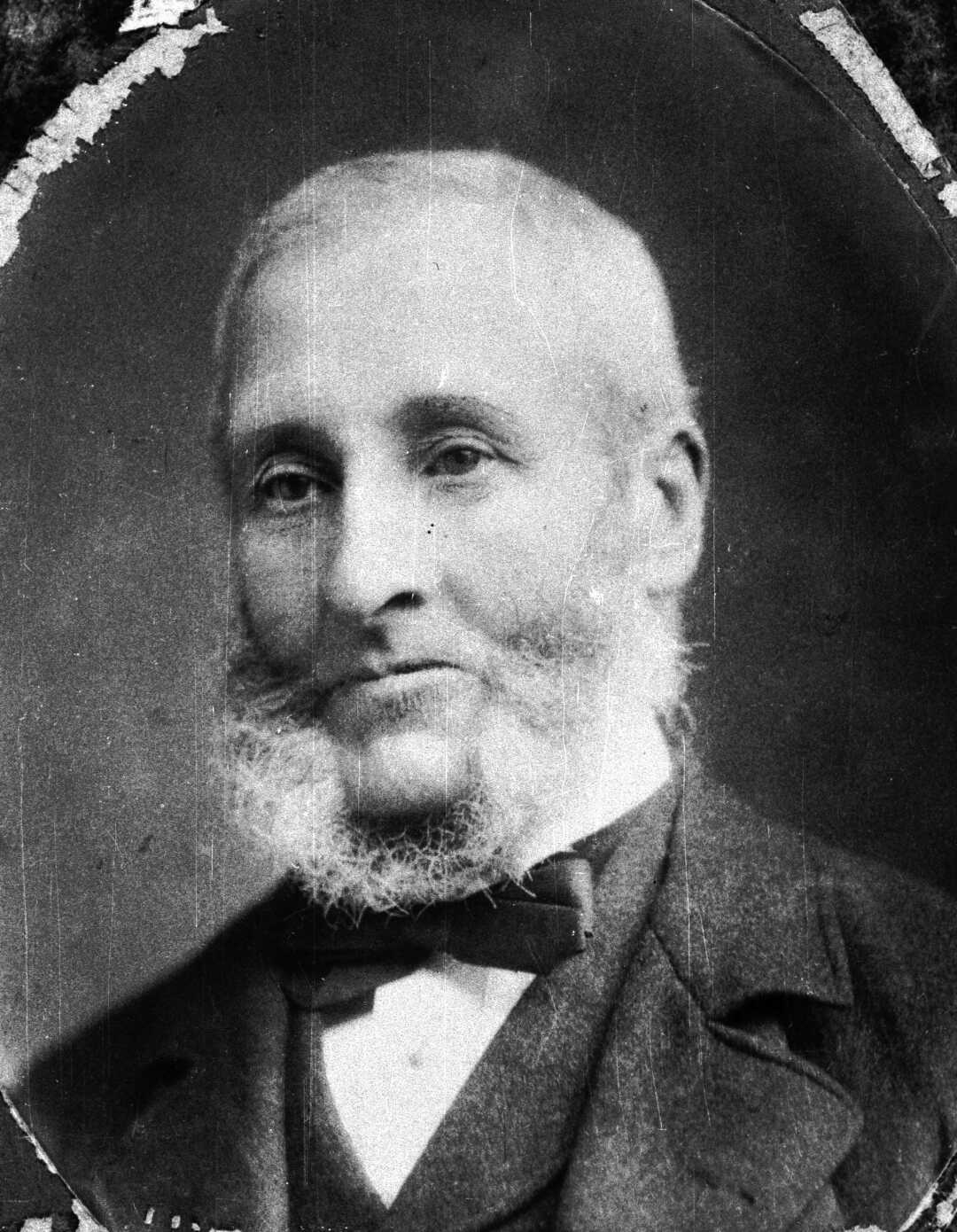
Conolly in c. 1892

Edward Tennyson Conolly (31 August 1822 – 8 November 1908) was a New Zealand lawyer, politician and judge.

New Zealand Parliament
Years	Term	Electorate	Party
1881–1884	8th	Picton	Independent
1884–1887	9th	Picton	Independent

Conolly was born in Chichester, Sussex, England, on 31 August 1822, and was the son of noted physician John Conolly.

He represented the Marlborough electorate of Picton in Parliament from 1881 to 1887, when he retired.

He was the Minister of Justice 1882–1884 and Attorney-General 1883–1884.

== Notes ==
New Zealand Parliament
Preceded by Courtney Kenny	Member of Parliament for Picton; 1881–1887	Constituency abolished
Political offices
Preceded by Thomas Dick	Minister of Justice; 1882–1884	Succeeded by Joseph Tole
Preceded by Frederick Whitaker	Attorney-General; 1883–1884	Succeeded by Robert Stout
