= Richard Hobbs (politician) =

New Zealand politician

Richard Hobbs (1833 – 16 July 1910) was a 19th-century Member of Parliament from the Auckland and Northland regions in New Zealand.

His father was the missionary John Hobbs.

Richard was born in Hokitika, see obituaries:

== Member of Parliament ==
New Zealand Parliament
Years	Term	Electorate	Party
1878–1879	6th	Franklin	Independent
1881–1884	8th	Bay of Islands	Independent
1884–1887	9th	Bay of Islands	Independent
1887–1890	10th	Bay of Islands	Independent

He represented the Franklin electorate from 20 May 1878 to 15 August 1879 when he was defeated, and the Bay of Islands electorate from 9 December 1881 to 3 October 1890, when he retired.

== Death ==
He died in Herne Bay, Ponsonby, Auckland, see death notices:

New Zealand Parliament
In abeyance Title last held by Hugh Carleton	Member of Parliament for Bay of Islands; 1881–1890	Succeeded by Robert Houston
