= James Clark Brown =

New Zealand politician

New Zealand Parliament
Years	Term	Electorate	Party
1870	4th	Bruce	Independent
1871–1875	5th	Tuapeka	Independent
1875–1879	6th	Tuapeka	Independent
1879–1881	7th	Tuapeka	Independent
1881–1884	8th	Tuapeka	Independent
1884–1887	9th	Tuapeka	Independent
1887–1890	10th	Tuapeka	Independent

James Clark Brown (December 1830 – 6 February 1891) was a 19th-century Member of Parliament in Otago, New Zealand.

He stood unsuccessfully in the 1869 by-election for Wallace; a contemporary report saying that his loss was due to his own inaction and also to the small number of miners and settlers on the electoral roll. He was a resident of Lawrence.

He represented the Bruce electorate in 1870 (from 21 March to 30 December), and then the Tuapeka electorate from 1871 to 1890, when he was defeated.

He represented Tuapeka on the Otago Provincial Council from 1865 to 1876. His obituary says that he was born in Macclesfield, Cheshire, England and died in St Clair, Dunedin.

New Zealand Parliament
Preceded by John Cargill	Member of Parliament for Bruce; 1870	Succeeded by William Murray
New constituency	Member of Parliament for Tuapeka; 1871-1890	Succeeded by Hugh Valentine
