= Joseph Dargaville =

New Zealand politician (1837–1896)

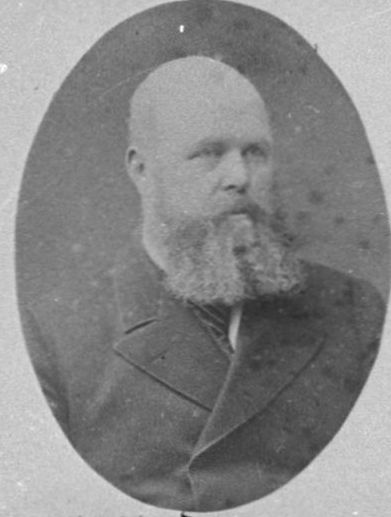
Joseph Dargaville in 1882

Joseph McMullen Dargaville (1837 – 27 October 1896) was a 19th-century New Zealand Member of Parliament and founder of the town of Dargaville.

== Early life ==
Joseph McMullen Dargaville was born in Cork, Ireland, the son of Anderson Dargaville, a physician, and his wife, Eliza McMullen. He was descended from Huguenots, who had fled to Ireland to escape persecution. He was baptised on 27 June 1837 and presumed to have been born earlier that same year. He attended Fermoy College.

== Business career ==
Dargaville emigrated with his brothers to Victoria. In early 1859 he relocated again, this time to Sydney, where he obtained a clerking job with the Union Bank of Australia at a salary of £100 per annum. From 1860 to 1866 he worked in several branches of the bank in New South Wales, Tasmania and Victoria.

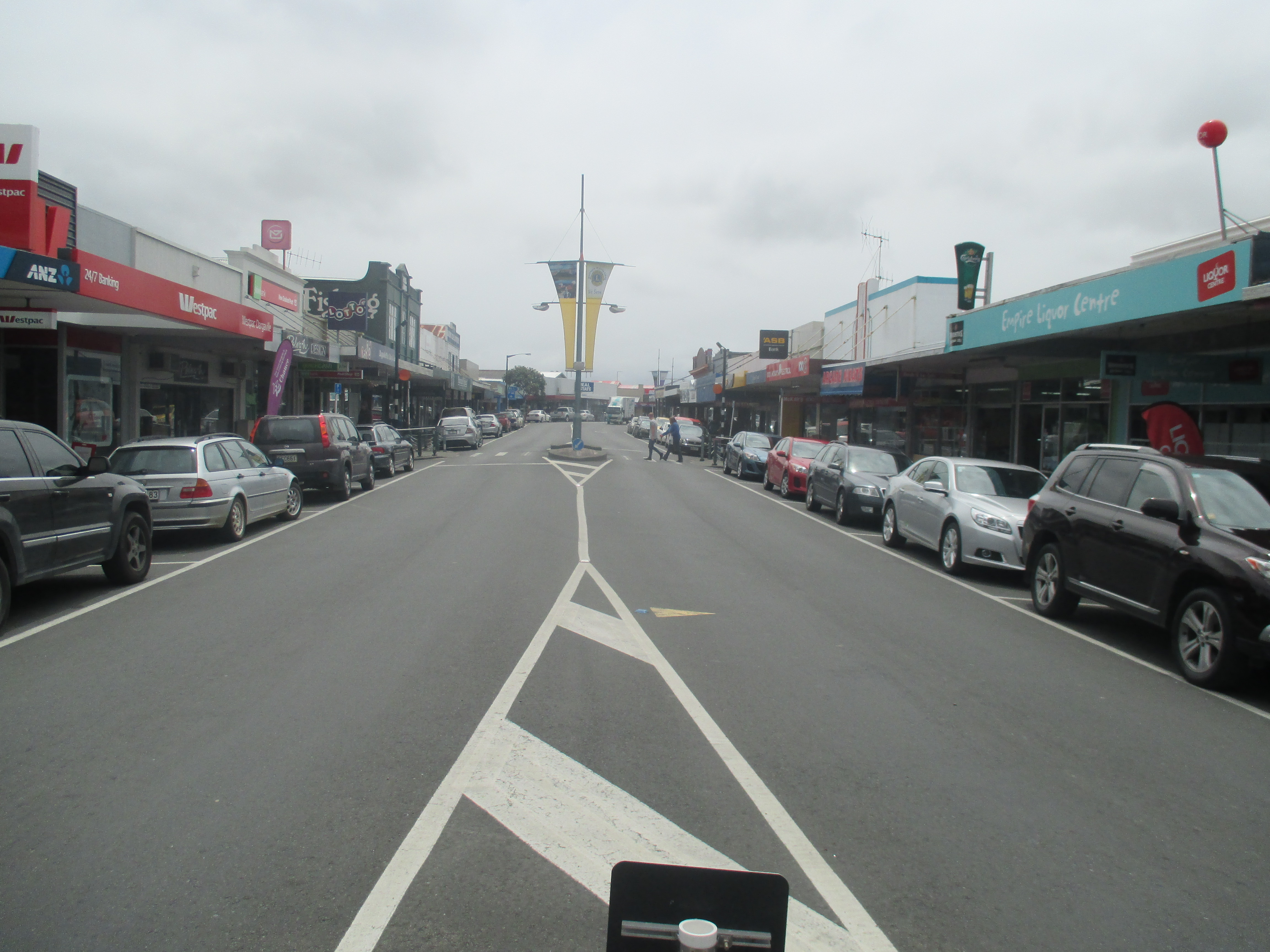
Victoria Street, Dargaville (2015) - the town originally established by Joseph Dargaville

In 1871 Dargaville visited the Northern Wairoa River (north of the Kaipara Harbour. Seeing the potential of the kauri timber and gum, he leased land and set up a trading post.

The next year he purchased the Tunatahi block - a block of 171 acres at the junction of the Wairoa and Kaihū Rivers. Here he founded and developed the town of Dargaville. He build stores, sheds, tramways, wharves, houses and two hotels. Owning the majority of the town he made a substantial income from the lease.

He was one of the original proponents for the Kaihu Valley Railway line.

== Marriage ==
On 20 April 1865 at Portland, Victoria, he wed Anne Must, daughter of Thomas and Anne Must; the couple had at least six children. His wife was born on 1 May 1845 in Sydney, they had two sons and five daughters.

== Political career ==
New Zealand Parliament
Years	Term	Electorate	Party
1881–1884	8th	Auckland West	Independent
1884–1887	9th	Auckland West	Independent

Dargaville would represent Auckland East on the Auckland Provincial Council from 1873 to 1876.

He stood unsuccessfully for the City of Auckland West in the 1875 by-election, then represented the electorate from 1881 to 1887.

In the 1887 election he stood in the Marsden electorate and was defeated by Robert Thompson (955 to 550 votes).

In the 1890 election he stood in the Bay of Islands electorate against three others (Robert Houston, James Trounsen, and John Lundon) and came last.

He contested the Bay of Islands electorate again in the 1893 election against two others (Houston and Trownson) and again came last.

He was a member of the Orange Order.

== Death ==
Dargaville was on a return visit from England when he died aboard the Mariposa on 27 October 1896, and was buried at sea. He has a memorial at the St Stephens Cemetery in Parnell, Auckland, shared with his wife Anne, who died on 5 July 1915.
