= 1877 Wairarapa by-election =

New Zealand by-election

The 1877 Wairarapa by-election was a by-election held on 3 July in the Wairarapa electorate in the Wairarapa during the 6th New Zealand Parliament.

The by-election was caused by the resignation of the incumbent, John Andrew, who was retiring from politics. The electorate was represented by two members; the other member being Henry Bunny.

Andrew was replaced by George Beetham.

Although Charles Pharazyn (a local landowner and son of Charles Johnson Pharazyn) had also been nominated he had withdrawn, and George Beetham was declared elected.
