= Jack Reese =

New Zealand cricketer (1877–1971)

Personal information
- Full name: John Bailie Reese
- Born: 23 April 1877; Christchurch, New Zealand
- Died: 26 January 1971 (aged 93); Christchurch, New Zealand
- Source: Cricinfo, 20 October 2020

John Bailie Reese (23 April 1877 – 26 January 1971) was a New Zealand cricketer. He played in two first-class matches for Canterbury in 1900/01. He was a son of Daniel Reese and two of his brothers were also prominent in cricket: Tom Reese and Dan Reese. His youngest brother, Andrew Reese, was an architect; he was killed in action in 1917.

Reese died on 26 January 1971 and was buried at Ruru Lawn Cemetery.

== See also ==
- List of Canterbury representative cricketers
