= Robert Trimble (politician) =

New Zealand politician (1824–1899)

Colonel Robert Trimble
- Born: 1824; Belfast, Ireland
- Died: September 5, 1899 (aged 74–75); New Plymouth, New Zealand
- Children: 7

Colonel Robert Trimble (1824 – 5 September 1899) was an Irish-born New Zealand politician and judge who served as a Member of Parliament.

== Early life ==
Trimble was born near Belfast, in 1824. He did his apprenticeship as a spinner at Sion Mills. He emigrated to the United States at age 21, where he remained for two or three years. While there, he was exposed to William Henry Channing's unitarianism, which he adopted instead of his presbyterian upbringing. He then moved to Manchester and then to Liverpool, where he worked for the American linen commission merchants Watson and Co.

In 1856, he married Jane Heywood of Manchester. She was the eldest daughter of Abel Heywood, who at the time was an alderman and later became the Mayor of Manchester. Their son, William Hayward Trimble, became the first librarian at the Hocken Collections.

While in Manchester, Robert became interested in the volunteer movement which caused him to join the Liverpool Irish. He then joined the 15th Lancashire Artillery Volunteers, where he financed an additional battery. He was appointed lieutenant-colonel and upon leaving Manchester, was promoted to honorary colonel. The leading personalities of Manchester attended his leaving dinner in 1875.

Trimble settled with his family near Inglewood on 2,000 acres (810 ha) of land purchased from the provincial government, on which he established a sawmill.

== Political career ==
New Zealand Parliament
Years	Term	Electorate	Party
1879–1881	7th	Grey and Bell	Independent
1881–1884	8th	Taranaki	Independent
1884–1887	9th	Taranaki	Independent

After the abolition of provincial government, he became the first chairman of the Inglewood Town Board. He represented the Grey and Bell electorate from 1879 to 1881, and then the Taranaki electorate from 1881 to 1887 when he was defeated. He contested the New Plymouth electorate in the 1893 election and was beaten by the incumbent, Edward Smith.

Later, he was a judge at the Native Land Court.

== Death ==
Trimble died on 5 September 1899, aged 74 or 75, at New Plymouth, after having been unwell for a long time.

New Zealand Parliament
Preceded by Frederic Carrington	Member of Parliament for Grey and Bell; 1879–1881	Constituency abolished
New constituency	Member of Parliament for Taranaki; 1881–1887	Succeeded by George Marchant
