= Thomas Peacock (politician) =

New Zealand politician

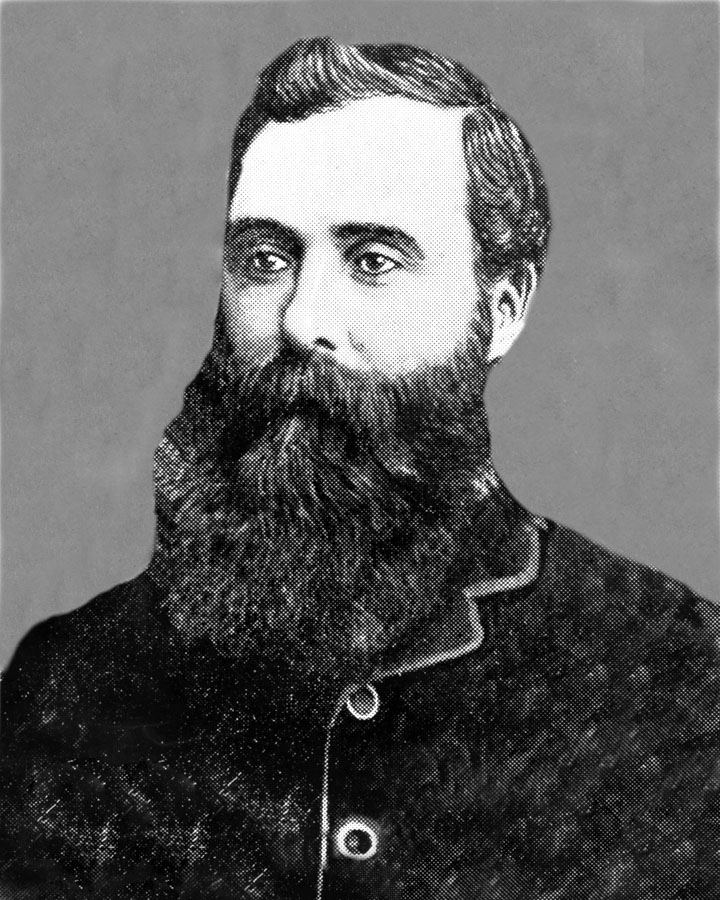
Thomas Peacock

Thomas Peacock (1837 – 18 February 1922) was a Scottish-born New Zealand optician, scientific instrument maker, 19th-century member of parliament, and mayor of the City of Auckland, New Zealand. He arrived in New Zealand in 1862 and established a business on Shortland Street specialising in sale and repair of surveying and nautical instruments. Amongst other positions held by him are those of chairman of the South British Insurance Company, and vice-president of the Auckland Savings Bank.

== Political career ==
Peacock entered public life through the Auckland City Council, representing the Auckland North electorate from 1881 to 1884. He served as Mayor of Auckland City from November 1878 to 1880, his mayoralty is noted for the establishment of the Auckland Free Public Library in September 1880.. After Auckland North, he represented Newton from 1884 to 1887, then Ponsonby from 1887 to 1890, after which he retired from politics.

In 1884, Peacock defeated Cecil de Lautour by 732 to 608 votes.

New Zealand Parliament
Years	Term	Electorate	Party
1881–1884	8th	Auckland North	Independent
1884–1887	9th	Newton	Independent
1887–1890	10th	Ponsonby	Independent

New Zealand Parliament
Preceded by William Swanson	Member of Parliament for Newton; 1884–1887	Succeeded by Edward Withy
Political offices
Preceded by Henry Brett	Mayor of Auckland City; 1878–1880	Succeeded by James Clark
