= Dan Reese (cricketer) =

New Zealand cricketer

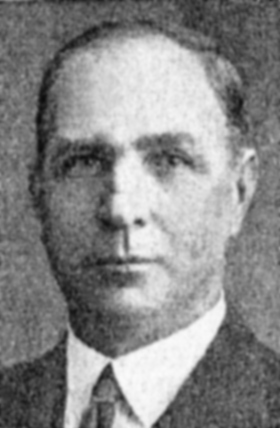
- Reese in 1930

Personal information
- Full name: Daniel Reese
- Born: 26 January 1879; Christchurch, New Zealand
- Died: 12 June 1953 (aged 74); Christchurch, New Zealand
- Batting: Left-handed
- Bowling: Left-arm slow-medium
- Relatives: Daniel Reese (father); Tom Reese (brother); Jack Reese (brother); Daniel Reese (nephew)

Career statistics
Competition	First-class
Matches	72
Runs scored	3,182
Batting average	25.25
100s/50s	4/16
Top score	148
Balls bowled	7,766
Wickets	196
Bowling average	19.86
5 wickets in innings	11
10 wickets in match	1
Best bowling	7/53
Catches/stumpings	36/–
- Source: CricketArchive, 14 March 2014

Daniel Reese (26 January 1879 – 12 June 1953) was a New Zealand cricketer.

== Biography ==
Reese was a son of Christchurch businessman, Member of Parliament and former rower Dan Reese. He was born in Christchurch in 1879 and received his education at West Christchurch School.

A left-handed batsman and a slow-medium bowler, Reese first represented his national team aged 19. His early cricket was with the Midland club in Christchurch and his provincial team, Canterbury. He left New Zealand to play for Melbourne Cricket Club from 1900 to 1903 before continuing to England. In England he played for London County and Essex. Plum Warner rated him as among the greatest fielders of all time.

He returned to New Zealand and captained Canterbury from 1907 to 1921, as well as New Zealand from 1907 to 1914, including the tour to Australia in 1913–14. His highest first-class score was 148—out of a team total of 274—for New Zealand against Lord Hawke's XI in 1902–03. His best bowling figures were 7 for 53 for the New Zealanders against Queensland in Brisbane in 1913–14.

After his playing days, Reese was involved in cricket administration, serving as president of the Canterbury Cricket Association and the New Zealand Cricket Council.

When Tom Lowry was president of the New Zealand Cricket Council he made a speech in 1952 in which he declared that Reese was one of New Zealand's "five greatest cricketers", along with Syd Hiddleston, Martin Donnelly, Bert Sutcliffe and Jack Cowie.

Reese managed the Golden Bay Cement Works in Tarakohe for three years.

Reese died in Christchurch on 12 June 1953.
