= James Wilson (New Zealand politician, born 1849) =

Politician from New Zealand born in 1849

Sir James Wilson
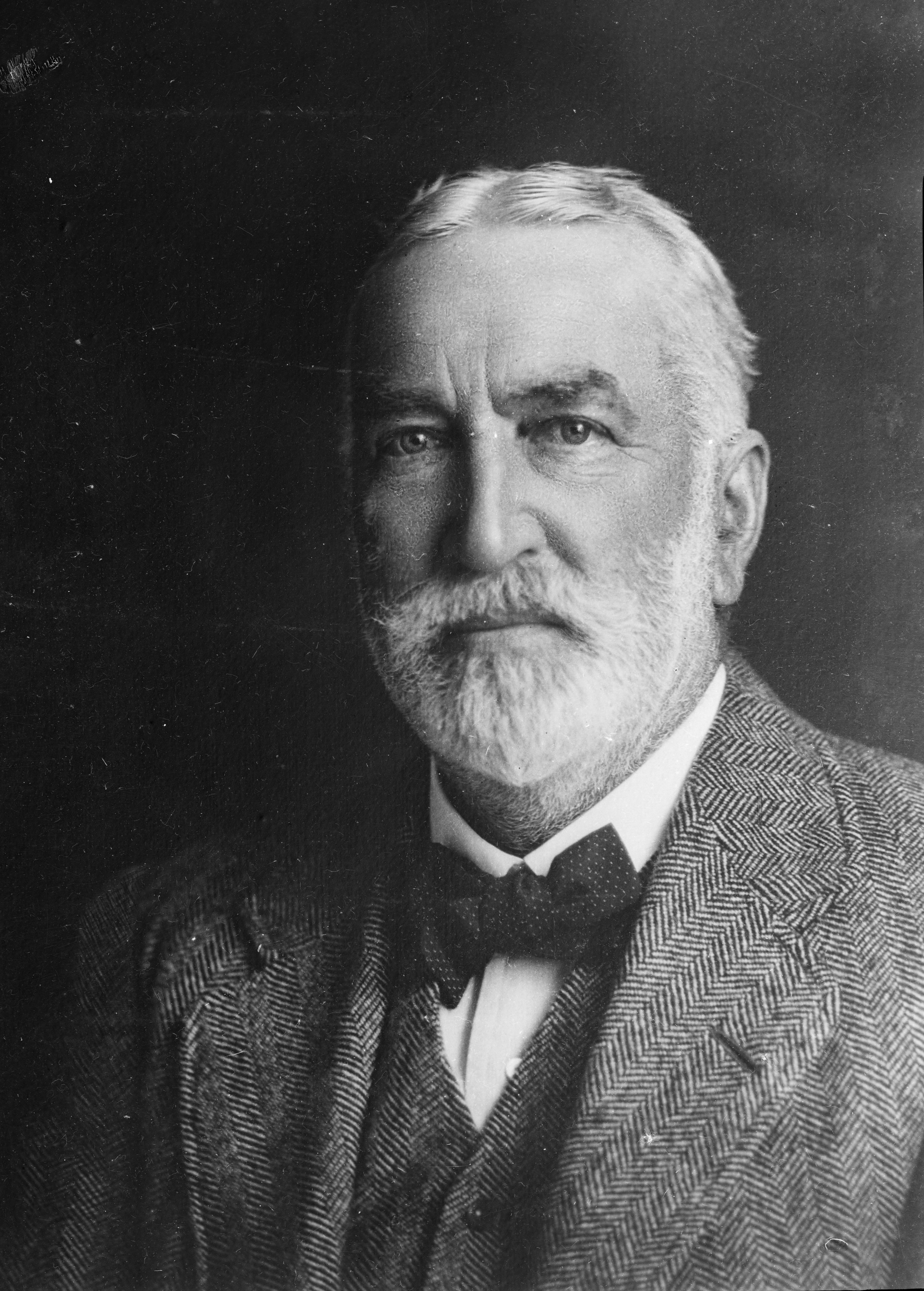
- James Wilson, c. 1910

Member of the New Zealand Parliament for Foxton
- In office 1881–1890
- Preceded by: new constituency
- Succeeded by: constituency abolished

Member of the New Zealand Parliament for Palmerston
- In office 1890–1893
- Preceded by: new constituency
- Succeeded by: Frederick Pirani

Member of the New Zealand Parliament for Otaki
- In office 1893–1896
- Preceded by: new constituency
- Succeeded by: Henry Augustus Field

Personal details
- Born: James Glenny Wilson; 29 November 1849 Hawick, Roxburghshire, Scotland
- Died: 3 May 1929 (aged 79) Bulls, New Zealand
- Spouse: Anne Adams
- Relations: Ormond Wilson (grandson); James Wilson (uncle)

Sir James Glenny Wilson (probably on 29 November 1849 – 3 May 1929) was a New Zealand politician and farmer.

== Biography ==
New Zealand Parliament
| Years | Term | Electorate | Party |
|---|---|---|---|
| 1881–1884 | 8th | Foxton | Independent |
| 1884–1887 | 9th | Foxton | Independent |
| 1887–1890 | 10th | Foxton | Independent |
| 1890–1893 | 11th | Palmerston | Independent |
| 1893–1896 | 12th | Otaki | Independent |

Originally from Hawick, Roxburghshire in Scotland, Wilson was educated at Bruce Castle School, in London, and then at the Edinburgh Institution. He emigrated to Victoria in 1870 and worked on a sheep run. He met his future wife, Annie Adams, at the Melbourne Club. She was born in 1848 at Greenvale, Victoria. He went to New Zealand in January 1873 and purchased a large block of rough land in an area between what is now Bulls and Sanson in the Rangitikei district. Once established, he returned to Australia and married Annie Adams near Skipton, Victoria.

Wilson represented Foxton in the 8th, 9th & 10th Parliaments (1881–1890), then Palmerston North in the 11th Parliament (1890–1893), and then Otaki in the 12th Parliament (1893–1896), after which retired. The 1881 election in the Foxton electorate was contested by six candidates, and he beat Charles Beard Izard, Walter Buller, George Russell, Alfred Newman, and W. France.

Wilson was knighted in 1915, and died at Bulls on 3 May 1929. He was the first president (1902–1920) of the Farmer's Union, now Federated Farmers. Ormond Wilson was his grandson. His uncle was the MP James Wilson, Financial Secretary to the Treasury and founder of both The Economist and the Chartered Bank of India, Australia and China.

New Zealand Parliament
| New constituency | Member of Parliament for Palmerston; 1890–1893 | Succeeded by Frederick Pirani |
| New constituency | Member of Parliament for Otaki; 1893–1896 | Succeeded by Henry Augustus Field |
