= 1882 Stanmore by-election =

New Zealand by-election

The 1882 Stanmore by-election was a by-election held on 12 July 1882 in the Stanmore electorate during the 8th New Zealand Parliament.

The by-election was caused by the election of the incumbent MP Walter Pilliet being voided on a petition on 20 February 1882.

The seat was retained by Pilliet.

Initially a 0 (zero) was mistaken for a 9 (nine) and the total for the Hon E. Richardson was wrong (336 not 345).

And the Waikato Times published a grossly erroneous poll result.

== Results ==
The following table gives the election result:

1882 Stanmore by-election
Party	Candidate	Votes	%	±%
Independent	Walter Pilliet	469	44.33	
Independent	Edward Richardson	345	32.61	
Independent	William Patten Cowlishaw	244	23.06	
Turnout		1,058		
Majority		124	11.72	
