= John Blair Whyte =

New Zealand politician (1840–1914)

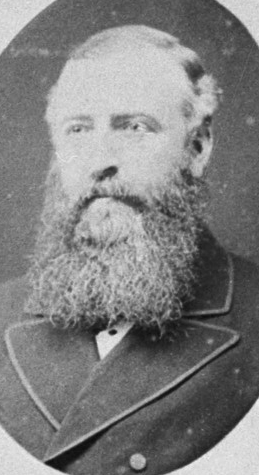
- Whyte in 1882

Member of the New Zealand Parliament for Waikato
- In office 1879–1890
- Preceded by: Frederick Whitaker
- Succeeded by: John Bryce

Member of the New Zealand Legislative Council
- In office 1891–1897

2nd Mayor of Hamilton
- In office December 1878 – December 1879
- Preceded by: Isaac Richardson Vialou
- Succeeded by: Thomas Dawson

Personal details
- Born: 1840
- Died: 21 July 1914 (aged 73–74) England
- Party: Independent
- Spouse: Ann MacGregor Hay (m. 1874)

John Blair Whyte (1840 – 21 July 1914) was a Member of Parliament and Mayor in the Waikato region of New Zealand.

== Political career ==
New Zealand Parliament
Years	Term	Electorate	Party
1879–1881	7th	Waikato	Independent
1881–1884	8th	Waikato	Independent
1884–1887	9th	Waikato	Independent
1887–1890	10th	Waikato	Independent

Whyte began his political career in 1877, when he became a member of the first Waikato County Council. Subsequently, he was the mayor of Hamilton from December 1878 to December 1879, when he resigned.

In September 1879, Whyte was elected to the New Zealand Parliament, where he represented Waikato. When he was elected, he claimed to be politically independent and supportive of the liberal policies of George Grey and his Ministry, which was defeated in the same election. Whyte retired from parliament in October 1890. Subsequently, he was appointed to the Legislative Council on 22 January 1891 by the outgoing ministry of Harry Atkinson, one of seven such appointments (which included Atkinson himself). These appointments were seen by Liberals as a stacking of the upper house against the new government. He served in that role until 1897, when he resigned on account of his decision to move to England.

After his resignation from the Legislative Council, Whyte advised the Bank of New Zealand on land values, and moved to England on matters relating to banking. Later, he moved to Auckland, where he reported on gold-mining in the region on behalf of an English gold syndicate, before returning to England, where he died on 21 July 1914.

== Personal life ==
Beginning in 1868, Whyte was a farmer, and owned land at Tuhuroa and Tuhikaramea, as well as a farm near Hamilton, which later became the Waikato Diocesan School. During the 1870s, Whyte began to sub-divide and sell his land, selling the last of his Tuhikaramea land by August 1882.

In 1874, Whyte married Annie MacGregor Hay. The couple had at least three children, one of whom was Kenneth Whyte, who was born in 1882 and died in March 1884 in Hamilton.

Political offices
Preceded by Isaac Richardson Vialou	Mayor of Hamilton, New Zealand; 1878–1879	Succeeded by Thomas Dawson
New Zealand Parliament
Preceded by Frederick Whitaker	Member of Parliament for Waikato; 1879–1890	Succeeded by John Bryce
