= James Dupré Lance =

New Zealand politician

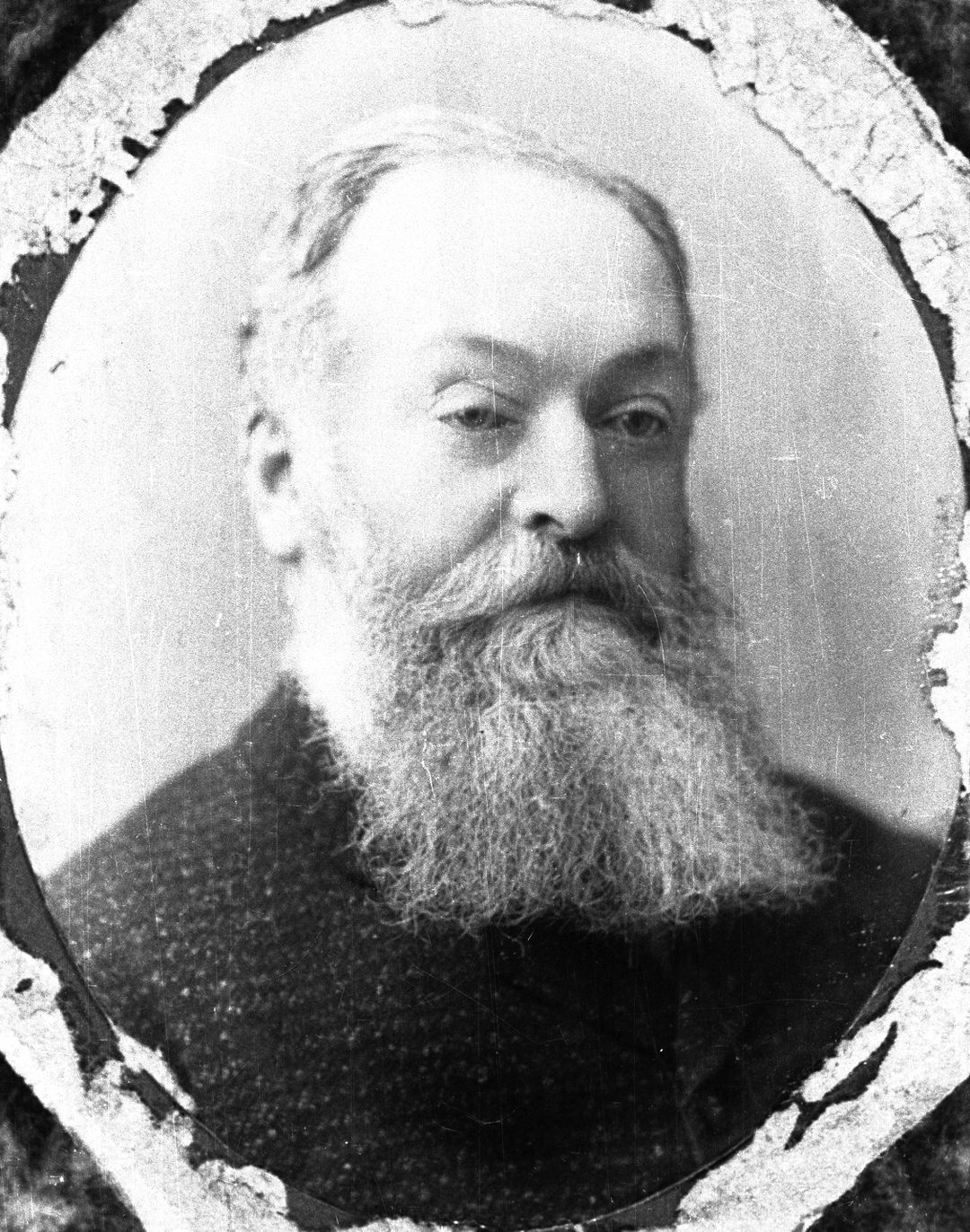

Member of the New Zealand Parliament for Cheviot
- In office 22 July 1884 – 5 December 1890
- Preceded by: Hugh McIlraith
- Succeeded by: Constituency abolished

Personal details
- Born: 28 January 1829 Boulogne, France
- Died: 28 March 1897 (aged 68) Waiau, New Zealand
- Spouse: Mary Ann Eliza Mallock (m. 1862)
- Children: Four
- Occupation: Runholder

James Dupré Lance (28 January 1829 – 28 March 1897) was a 19th-century Member of Parliament from Canterbury, New Zealand.

== Biography ==
New Zealand Parliament
Years	Term	Electorate	Party
1884–1887	9th	Cheviot	Independent
1887–1890	10th	Cheviot	Independent

Lance was born in Boulogne, France. He first came to New Zealand in 1856 to visit his brothers.

He contested the 1866 election for the superintendency of the Canterbury Provincial Council against William Sefton Moorhouse representing the runholders; he came a distant second. On 12 July 1865, Lance was appointed to the New Zealand Legislative Council. His membership lapsed on 18 October 1867 through absence. He represented the Cheviot electorate from 1884 to 1890.

He was a supporter of the Stout–Vogel government. After the government was defeated, it was left leaderless as Sir Robert Stout lost his seat and Sir Julius Vogel retired from parliament in 1888. Opposition MPs were in Parliament were in limbo. To address this, the opposition held a caucus to address the question of leadership. It resulted not to elect a new leader, but instead it decided on collective leadership, and elected a committee to co-ordinate its parliamentary operation. It consisted of Lance, John Ballance, John McKenzie, Oliver Samuel, Richard Seddon, William Steward and Frederick Moss as well as the two opposition whips; William Campbell Walker and Frederick Fitchett. Lance was elected as the leadership committee's chairman. By July 1889, Ballance had been elected as a permanent Leader of the Opposition, and Lance left the role of leadership committee chairman in favour of Ballance.

He later fell out with Ballance over policy differences on land and taxation policy. He broke from the Liberal Party and contested the Ashley electorate as an independent in the 1890 election, but was narrowly defeated by Richard Meredith in a three-way race.

New Zealand Parliament
Preceded by Hugh McIlraith	Member of Parliament for Cheviot; 1884–1890	Constituency abolished
