= Charles Beard Izard =

New Zealand politician (1829–1904)

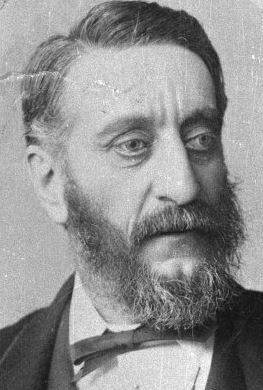

Member of the New Zealand Parliament for Wellington South and Suburbs
- In office 26 September 1887 – 5 December 1890
- Preceded by: seat established
- Succeeded by: seat abolished

Personal details
- Born: 4 December 1829 Brighton, England
- Died: 23 October 1904 (aged 74) Wellington, New Zealand
- Spouse: Mary Ann Hayward
- Relations: Charles Hayward Izard (son)
- Profession: Lawyer

Charles Beard Izard (4 December 1829 – 23 October 1904) was a 19th-century Member of Parliament and lawyer in Wellington, New Zealand.

== Biography ==
=== Early life ===
Izard was born in Brighton, England, and educated at King's College London and Magdalene College, Cambridge, graduating in mathematics in 1854. After studying at Lincoln's Inn he was admitted to the bar in England. He married Miss Mary Ann Hayward from Sussex in 1859. She died in Wellington on 18 July 1900 aged 71 years.

In 1860 they emigrated to Auckland, and that year moved to Wellington. He was a Crown solicitor and partner in the law firm that became Bell Gully. His son, Charles Hayward Izard, was a partner in that firm from 1882 to 1897. He was on the boards of local schools and local companies e.g. the Wellington and Manawatu Railway Company and the Meat Export Company. He retired from the law in 1887 due to failing eyesight.

=== Political career ===
New Zealand Parliament
Years	Term	Electorate	Party
1887–1890	10th	Wellington South and Suburbs	Independent

He contested the 1881 election and 1884 election in the Foxton electorate, where he was second of six candidates (1881), beaten by James Wilson.

He represented the Wellington South and Suburbs electorate from 1887 to 1890, when he was defeated (for the Hutt electorate).

His son Charles Hayward Izard was also a Member of Parliament.
