= John Holmes (New Zealand politician) =

New Zealand politician (1838–1907)

New Zealand Parliament
Years	Term	Electorate	Party
1881–1884	8th	Christchurch South	Independent
1884–1887	9th	Christchurch South	Independent

John Holmes (1838 – 3 July 1907) was a New Zealand Member of Parliament from Christchurch.

Holmes was born in Ireland in 1838, and emigrated first to Victoria and then to New Zealand.

He represented the Christchurch South electorate from 1881 to 1887, when he retired.

Holmes was a barrister and solicitor in Christchurch. He set up a law firm in 1868. He later went into partnership with Andrew Loughrey. The firm is today known as Lane Neave.

In the 1884 election, he was challenged by Thomas Joynt, whom he defeated with 638 votes to 600.

Holmes lived in retirement on his estate, "Viewmount", near Methven. He later returned to live in Christchurch, where he died on 3 July 1907. He was buried in Methven Cemetery.

New Zealand Parliament
New constituency	Member of Parliament for Christchurch South; 1881–1887	Succeeded by Westby Perceval
