= Wairarapa South =

Wairarapa South was a New Zealand parliamentary electorate from 1881 to 1887.

== Population centres ==
The previous electoral redistribution was undertaken in 1875 for the 1875–1876 election. In the six years since, New Zealand's European population had increased by 65%. In the 1881 electoral redistribution, the House of Representatives increased the number of European representatives to 91 (up from 84 since the 1875–76 election). The number of Māori electorates was held at four. The House further decided that electorates should not have more than one representative, which led to 35 new electorates being formed, including Wairarapa South, and two electorates that had previously been abolished to be recreated. This necessitated a major disruption to existing boundaries.

Wairarapa South was centred on the smaller Wairarapa towns of Featherston, Greytown, Carterton and Martinborough.

== History ==
The Wairarapa South electorate in the Wairarapa district of New Zealand and the adjacent Wairarapa North electorate were formed for the 1881 election by splitting the old Wairarapa electorate. These electorates existed for two parliamentary terms from 1881 to 1887, when Wairarapa North was renamed Masterton, and Wairarapa South became the new Wairarapa electorate.

Between 1871 and 1881, the previous Wairarapa electorate had been a two-member electorate. One of the incumbents, George Beetham, successfully stood in 1881 in the Wairarapa North electorate. The other incumbent, Henry Bunny, who had represented Wairarapa since a by-election in 1865, contested the Wairarapa South electorate in 1881 and was challenged by Wally Buchanan and Burton Boys. Bunny, Buchanan and Boys received 370, 436, and 133 votes, respectively, with Buchanan thus defeating Bunny.

The 1884 election was contested by Bunny and Buchanan, who received 504 and 565 votes, respectively, and Buchanan was thus declared re-elected.

In 1887, Buchanan won the reconstituted Wairarapa electorate, again defeating Bunny.

=== Election results ===
Wairarapa South was represented by one MP for all six years.

Key

Independent

Election	Winner
1881 election	Wally Buchanan
1884 election	Wally Buchanan
