= Walter Pilliet =

Walter Pilliet JP
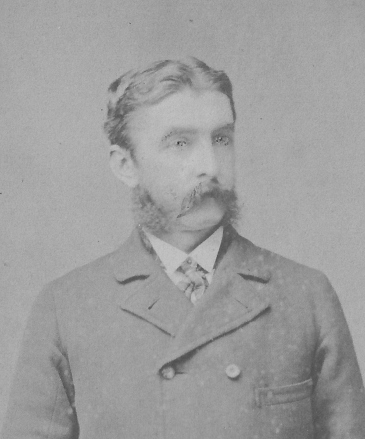
- Walter Pilliet in his 30s

Member of the New Zealand Parliament for Stanmore
- In office 9 December 1881 – 20 February 1882
- In office 11 July 1882 – 27 June 1884

Personal details
- Born: 8 February 1840 Lyon; France
- Died: 7 November 1885 (aged 45) Wellington; New Zealand
- Spouse(s): Mary Ann Johnstone (m. 1864); Agnes Hay (m. 1872)
- Children: three daughters, two sons (including Charles Pilliet)
- Profession: politician, surveyor, resident magistrate

Walter Hippolyte Pilliet JP (8 February 1840 – 7 November 1885) was a 19th-century Member of Parliament in Christchurch, New Zealand. He worked initially as a surveyor and was then resident magistrate in several places. He was a newspaper editor and was represented in Parliament for one term.

== Early life ==
He was born in Lyon on 8 February 1840 to an English mother and French father. His mother, Anna (née Coyney), was the daughter of Walter Hill Coyney. His mother's sister, Mary, was the mother of Charles Clifford. His father, Chevalier Jean Hippolyte Pilliet (1793–1881), was an army officer who distinguished himself at Waterloo.

== Professional life ==
His mother's family was Catholic, and English Catholic relatives had preceded Walter Pilliet in the colony – the Cliffords, the Vavasours, Frederick Weld. These connections assisted him in finding his first position, working as a clerk in the Lands Office in Wellington, upon his arrival, and he was soon transferred to Napier to work in the Hawke's Bay Provincial Survey Department. It was here that he met Sir Donald McLean, then Superintendent of Hawke's Bay Province.

Back in Wellington in 1864, he met his acquaintance Coutts Crawford, who suggested he accompany him to Havelock in the Marlborough Sounds, where gold had recently been discovered. Crawford was resident magistrate there and quickly appointed Pilliet warden of the burgeoning gold fields; by 1865 the 25-year-old Pilliet was himself resident magistrate. He was made a justice of the peace in 1866.

He met Mary Ann Johnston of Nelson and married her in that city in 1865. In 1867 he joined the Marine Survey to chart the Marlborough coastline as assistant surveyor under surveyor Lieutenant Woods. The Government steamer St Kilda left Wellington on 15 December 1867 under Captain Fox, but the ship struck rocks at Kaikōura the following day in calm weather.

Woods and Pilliet were soon back in the area, this time on the ketch Sea Bird from Lyttelton. On 2 and 3 February 1868, there was heavy rain and a severe gale in the area, causing floods "greater than have ever been known by the oldest settlers". The Sea Bird foundered on 3 February at Amuri Bluff, some 20 km south of Kaikōura. Pilliet received a serious injury to his ankle and the survey gear was lost, but all on board survived. In December of that year he became Resident Magistrate at Kaikōura.

That position was disestablished the following year and he became private secretary to Sir Donald Mclean, based in Auckland, handling his correspondence and keeping him informed of political news. McLean proved an awkward man to work for, and when the Resident Magistracy of Akaroa became vacant in 1870, he applied for and was granted the position.

Pilliet had two enjoyable years on the Peninsula, where he was popular with both the English and French settler families due to his knowledge of languages. During that time, he pursued negotiations over land with local Māori. This was brought to an abrupt end in May 1872 when his wife Mary Ann died. Pilliet married again to a daughter of Ebenezer and Agnes Hay, a very well known Banks Peninsula family, but happiness was once more short-lived. Pilliet's temper again had been his undoing; he was dismissed from the Magistracy, after a conviction for assault was upheld in the Lyttelton Magistrate's Court. On 23 May 1873, he had punched the Christchurch architect Samuel Farr during an altercation on the Lyttelton wharf at Dampier's Bay. Justin Aylmer succeeded him as Resident Magistrate in Akaroa.

He then pursued a newspaper career, editing and purchasing at least one Canterbury newspaper (The Sun). During this time, he had his political career, both on local and national level.

== Political career ==
New Zealand Parliament
Years	Term	Electorate	Party
1881–1882	8th	Stanmore	Independent
1882–1884	8th	Stanmore	Independent

Pilliet was elected for Bays in the Canterbury Provincial Council. He served on the seventh (and last) Council and represented his electorate from 11 April 1874 until the dissolution on 31 October 1876.

Following the resignation of Robert Heaton Rhodes from his Akaroa seat in the New Zealand parliament, William Montgomery and Pilliet contested the 20 April 1874 by-election. The results were 168 and 76 votes, respectively, i.e. a margin of 92 for Montgomery, who thus entered parliament.

In July 1874, a select committee declared Montgomery's election to be "null and void" on a technicality. The select committee accepted that the breach was inadvertent and Montgomery stood for re-election in the 10 August 1874 by-election. Pilliet chose not to stand for election this time, neither did anybody else, and Montgomery was thus returned unopposed.

Montgomery and Pilliet contested the 1875 general election, which was held on 29 December. Once again, Montgomery had the upper hand, with 205 versus 159 votes recorded in his favour. Pilliet's problem was that their political views were quite similar, and the voters were satisfied with Montgomery's performance. Pilliet did not stand for the 1879 general election in any of the electorates.

In the 1881 general election, the Stanmore electorate was contested by Pilliet, William Patten Cowlishaw (a partner of Francis James Garrick) and William Flesher (father of James Flesher). They received 383, 362 and 303 votes, respectively. Pilliet was declared elected with a majority of 21 votes.

Following a petition, the 1881 election was declared invalid with effect of 20 February 1882. The resulting 12 July 1882 by-election was contested by Pilliet, Edward Richardson and Cowlishaw. They received 469, 345 and 244 votes, respectively. Pilliet was declared elected with a majority of 124 votes.

There were rumours in July 1883 that Pillet was sick and would void the seat in favour of Richardson, but this did not eventuate.

The 1884 general election was contested by five candidates. The incumbent, through his political conduct, had become deeply unpopular in his electorate and came a distant fourth place. Dan Reese, George Ruddenklau, Dorney, Pilliet and Wansey received 524, 435, 142, 43 and 19 votes, respectively. The majority for Reese was 89 votes. There was some protest about the election, but this came to nothing and the result stood as declared.

== Family and death ==
Pilliet married twice. His first marriage was in 1865 at Nelson to Mary Ann Johnston. They had two sons and three daughters. His wife died on 31 May 1872, aged 26 years. This was after complications following the birth of her fifth child, Caroline, on 22 May 1872.

In 1872, he married Agnes Hay of Pigeon Bay on Banks Peninsula. There were no further children from the second marriage.

It was after his 1884 parliamentary defeat that he moved again into political reporting for the daily press, and made arrangements to bring his young family to resettle them in Wellington. They had yet to leave Christchurch, however, before news came that he had taken ill and died at his home on 7 November 1885. He is buried at Mount Street Catholic Cemetery in that city.

His second wife, Agnes Hay, left the colony after a few years for the United Kingdom, leaving her step children with relatives in New Zealand. She remarried to a Scottish shipping magnate, and never saw the children again.

Of Pilliet's five children, only the youngest, Caroline, was to marry and have children. She married William Pringle in Nelson in 1897.

Pilliet's father had fought for the French army in his youth, and died in Dunkerque in 1881, and his mother also died there in 1893. His sister, Ann Mary, died unmarried in the same town in 1920. The Pilliet name does not live on in New Zealand today but is found in some parts of France.

New Zealand Parliament
New constituency	Member of Parliament for Stanmore; 1881–84	Succeeded by Dan Reese
