= Dan Reese (politician) =

New Zealand politician

Member of the New Zealand Parliament for Stanmore
- In office 22 July 1884 – 15 July 1887

Personal details
- Born: Daniel Reese; 31 October 1841 Motherwell, Scotland
- Died: 4 October 1891 (aged 49) Sumner, New Zealand
- Spouse: Cecilia (m. 1867)
- Children: Tom Reese (1867–1949); Jack Reese (1877–1971); Dan Reese (1879–1953)
- Profession: Builder; Politician

Daniel Reese (31 October 1841 – 4 October 1891) was a 19th-century Member of Parliament from Christchurch, New Zealand.

Reese was born in Motherwell, (Note: Contemporary obituaries recorded that he had been born at Wishaw and had trained as a carpenter and builder at the Motherwell Ironworks; this was repeated by Guy Scholefield in his 1940 Dictionary of New Zealand Biography. George Macdonald later recorded that the birth place was not correct and that it was his brother Alec who had trained at Motherwell Ironworks.) Scotland, on 31 October 1841. He emigrated to New Zealand in 1862 on the New Zealandia. His wife to be, Cecilia, was also from Lanarkshire in Scotland and arrived in New Zealand in 1863. They married in 1867. Reese founded a building firm in 1864. He was a champion rower, and his son Dan Reese (who was 12 when Reese Sr. died) was a champion Canterbury cricketer. Two other sons, Tom and Jack, were also prominent cricketers in Canterbury. His youngest son, Andrew Reese, was an architect; he was killed in action in 1917.

Reese had several high-profile commissions. He built Trinity Congregational Church (ca 1870), the Canterbury Club (1873), Cranmer Court (1873–1875), St Paul's Church (1877), parts of Lincoln College, the Chief Post Office (1877–1878), the United Service Hotel in Cathedral Square (1884–1885), parts of Sunnyside Hospital, the first Christchurch Girls' High School (now part of the Arts Centre), and the second Girls' High School (1881). He also built the Belfast Freezing Works.

New Zealand Parliament
Years	Term	Electorate	Party
1884–1887	9th	Stanmore	Independent

Reese was elected onto Christchurch City Council for the South-west ward in 1882 and served until 1885. He was re-elected for the period from 1888 to 1891. He represented the Stanmore electorate from 1884 when he defeated Walter Pilliet, but was defeated in 1887 by Andrew Loughrey when he stood in Linwood.

Reese had Bright's disease and was ill for four months before he died at his home in Sumner on 4 October 1891. He had moved to Sumner while he was ill as he sought improvement from breathing sea air. He was buried at Addington Cemetery.
