= Tom Reese (cricket historian) =

New Zealand cricketer (1867–1949)

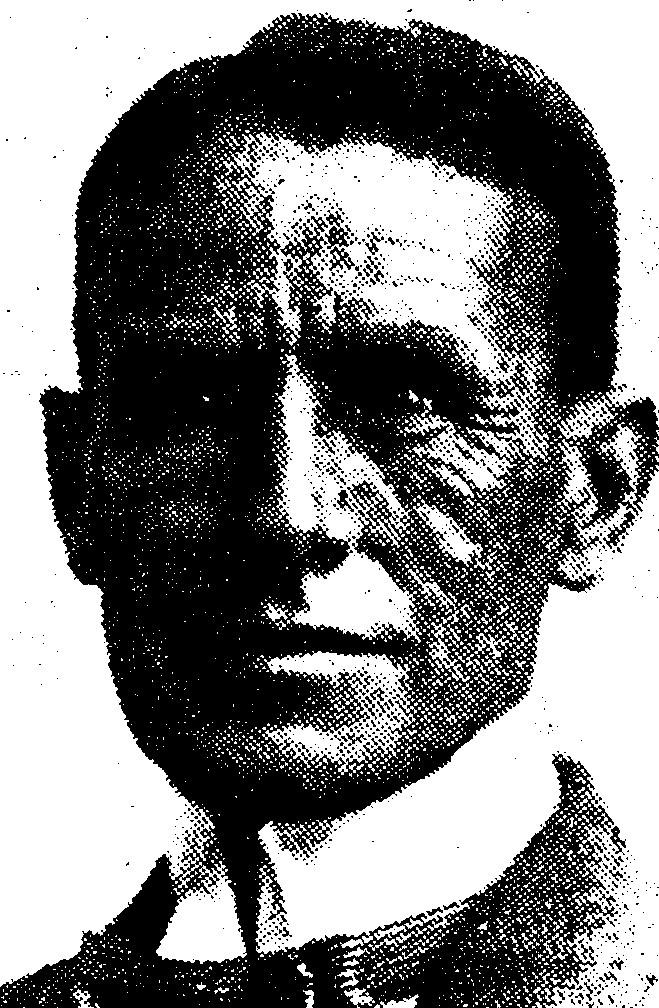
- Reese in 1937

Personal information
- Full name: Thomas Wilson Reese
- Born: 29 September 1867; Christchurch, New Zealand
- Died: 13 April 1949 (aged 81); Merivale, Christchurch, New Zealand
- Relatives: Dan Reese (father); Dan Reese (brother); Jack Reese (brother)

Domestic team information
- Years: Team
- 1887/88–1917/18: Canterbury

Career statistics
Competition	First-class
Matches	24
Runs scored	374
Batting average	10.10
100s/50s	0/1
Top score	53
Catches/stumpings	20/0
- Source: CricketArchive, 10 October 2014

Thomas Wilson Reese (29 September 1867 – 13 April 1949) was a New Zealand first-class cricketer who played for Canterbury from 1888 to 1918, and later wrote a two-volume history of New Zealand cricket.

== Life and career ==
Reese was one of the first pupils at Christchurch Boys' High School. He was the older brother of Dan Reese, who captained the New Zealand cricket team from 1907 to 1914. Jack Reese, a younger brother, also played cricket. His younger brother Alexander went as a missionary to Brazil. His youngest brother, Andrew Reese, was an architect; he was killed in action in 1917. Their father, Daniel Reese, was a builder and a member of parliament.

Tom played irregularly over two decades for Canterbury, batting low in the order. He reached fifty only once, when he made 53 against Hawke's Bay in 1903–04. However, he was regarded as one of the best fieldsmen in New Zealand. A spectacular catch he took in his first first-class match established his reputation:

Niven sent Dunlop hard to leg, and Reese, running along the boundary for some twenty or thirty yards, took a headlong dive, and was next seen at full length on the ground with his left arm extended just clear of the turf, and the ball held, to the surprise of the whole field. Niven's innings thus ended with the most brilliant catch that had ever been seen on the ground.

Reese was a prominent batsman in Christchurch club cricket; in the 1906–07 season, playing for St Albans, he was the only player in the competition to score three centuries. He captained Canterbury once, leading them to a five-wicket victory over Wellington in 1906–07.

He formed a successful business partnership with Dan. After many years of research, he wrote the first volume of his 1200-page history of New Zealand cricket, New Zealand Cricket, 1841–1914, in 1927, and the second volume, New Zealand Cricket, 1914–1933, in 1936.

Reese and his wife Georgina, who predeceased him, had a daughter and two sons. He died at his home in the Christchurch suburb of Merivale in April 1949, aged 81.
