= Fred Sutton =

New Zealand politician (1836–1906)

New Zealand Parliament
Years	Term	Electorate	Party
1877–1879	6th	Napier	Independent
1879–1881	7th	Napier	Independent
1881–1884	8th	Hawkes Bay	Independent

Frederick Sutton (1836 – 26 January 1906) was a 19th-century Member of Parliament from the Hawke's Bay Region of New Zealand and an early settler, storekeeper and farmer in the area.

He represented the Napier electorate from an 1877 by-election to 1881, and then the Hawkes Bay electorate from 1881 to 1884, when he was defeated.

He died in Napier on 26 January 1906 aged 69 years, leaving a widow, one son and five or six daughters.

New Zealand Parliament
Preceded by Donald McLean	Member of Parliament for Napier; 1877–1881; Served alongside: William Russell	Succeeded by John Buchanan
New constituency	Member of Parliament for Hawke's Bay; 1881–1884	Succeeded by William Russell
