= Cecil de Lautour =

New Zealand politician

New Zealand Parliament
Years	Term	Electorate	Party
1876–1879	6th	Mount Ida	Independent
1879–1881	7th	Mount Ida	Independent
1881–1884	8th	Mount Ida	Independent

Cecil Albert de Lautour (1845 – 15 December 1930) was a 19th-century Member of Parliament in the Otago region of New Zealand.

He represented the Mount Ida electorate from 1876 to 1884.

In circa 1879, he moved to Napier to pursue a legal career. In July 1884, he travelled to Auckland to contest the Newton electorate in the 1884 election. Thomas Peacock defeated him by 732 to 608 votes.

He stood in the 1893 election in the Waiapu electorate and was beaten by James Carroll.

He died on 15 December 1930.

New Zealand Parliament
Preceded by David Mervyn	Member of Parliament for Mount Ida; 1876–1884	Succeeded by Scobie Mackenzie
