= George Beetham =

New Zealand politician (1840–1915)

New Zealand Parliament
Years	Term	Electorate	Party
1877–1879	6th	Wairarapa	Independent
1879–1881	7th	Wairarapa	Independent
1881–1884	8th	Wairarapa North	Independent
1884–1887	9th	Wairarapa North	Independent
1887–1890	10th	Masterton	Independent

George Beetham, F.R.G.S., M.H.R. (1840 – 20 August 1915), known to Māori as Hori Pitama, was a New Zealand politician and alpinist.

Beetham was born in 1840 in Horncastle, Lincolnshire, England. His father was the noted portrait painter William Beetham. The Beetham family emigrated to New Zealand in 1855, arriving on the William and Jane in 1855. Together with his brothers, he settled in the Wairarapa. The brothers built up a farm on land bought by his father, and Brancepeth Station was by 1901 the largest land holding in the Wairarapa, at 24,000 hectares (240 km^{2}). As the land had originally been owned by Māori, Beetham engaged with them frequently and they knew him as Hori Pitama. His sister Susannah married Cecil Fitzroy in 1878.

Beetham made his first exploration of Mount Ruapehu in March 1878. In 1879, Beetham, accompanied by Joseph Prime Maxwell, a civil engineer of Wellington, made a complete ascent of Mount Ruapehu, and, reaching its summit, crossed the large southern glacier, and made a close examination of the hot lake that is in the great ice plateau, the existence of which had not been previously recorded. In 1881 Beetham made another ascent of the north-east ridge to the Tahurangi peak accompanied by William Birch and his wife Ethel, the first European woman to make the ascent.

Beetham represented the Wairarapa West electorate on the Wellington Provincial Council from February 1873 until the abolition of provincial government in October 1876. He represented the Wairarapa electorate in Parliament, after winning the 1877 by-election, to 1881. He then represented the Wairarapa North electorate from 1881 to 1887, and the Masterton electorate from 1887 to 1890, when he was defeated by just 18 votes. For a time, he was in Parliament at the same time as Fitzroy, his brother-in-law.

Beetham moved to London in 1898, and died there on 20 August 1915.

== Notes ==
New Zealand Parliament
Preceded by John Chapman Andrew, Henry Bunny	Member of Parliament for Wairarapa; 1877–1881; Served alongside: Henry Bunny	In abeyance Title next held by Walter Clarke Buchanan
