= William Hogg Watt =

New Zealand politician

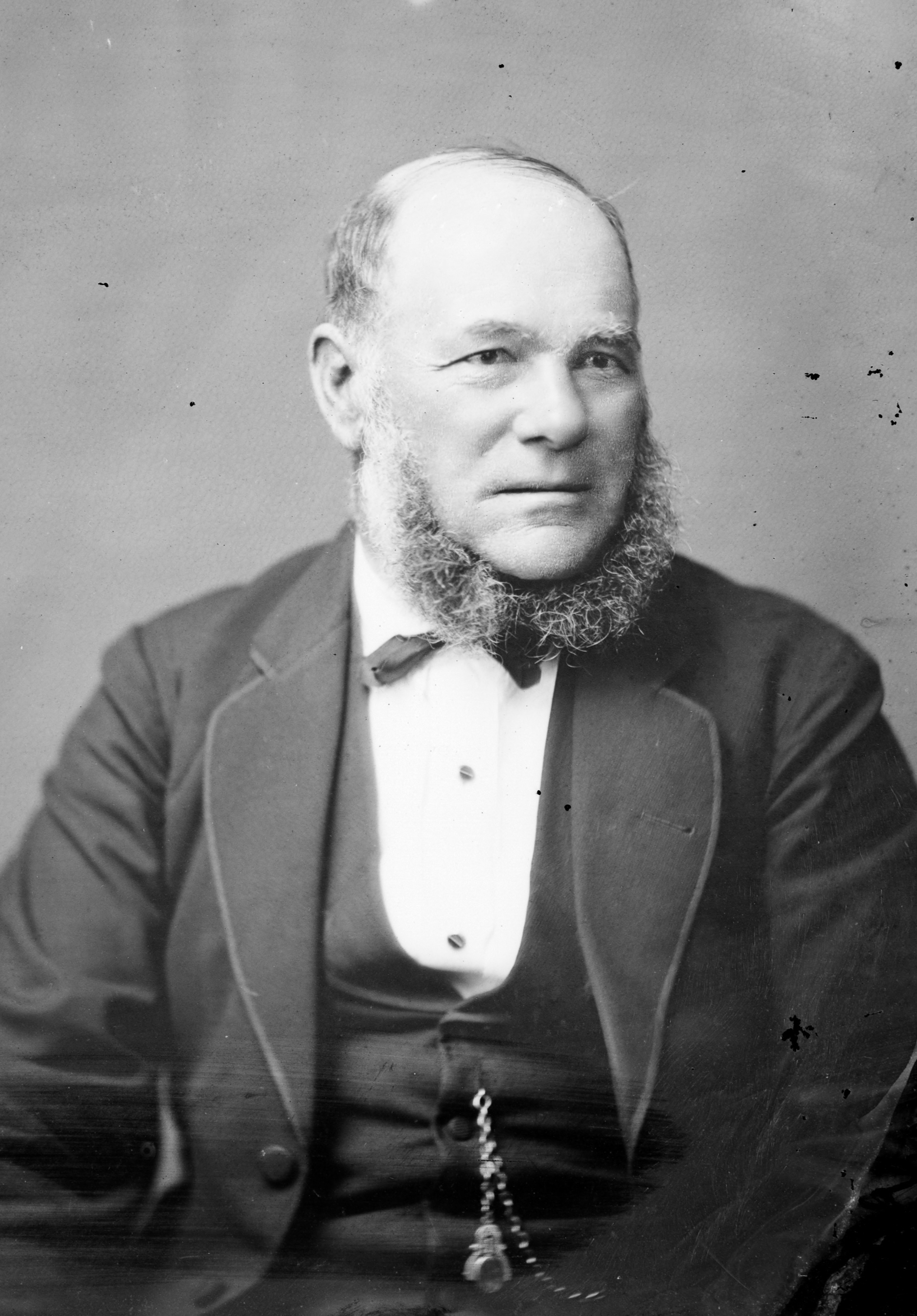
William Hogg Watt during the 1870s

William Hogg Watt (1818–1893) was a 19th-century Member of Parliament in the Manawatū region of New Zealand.

== Wellington Provincial Council ==
Watt was elected to the Wellington Provincial Council at the 1853 New Zealand provincial elections, representing Wanganui and Rangitikei.

== Member of Parliament ==
New Zealand Parliament
Years	Term	Electorate	Party
1866–1868	4th	Rangitikei	Independent
1881–1884	8th	Wanganui	Independent

He represented the Rangitikei electorate from 1866 to 1868 when he resigned, being replaced by William Fox. He then represented the Wanganui electorate from 1881 to 1884 when he was defeated.

== Mayor of Wanganui ==
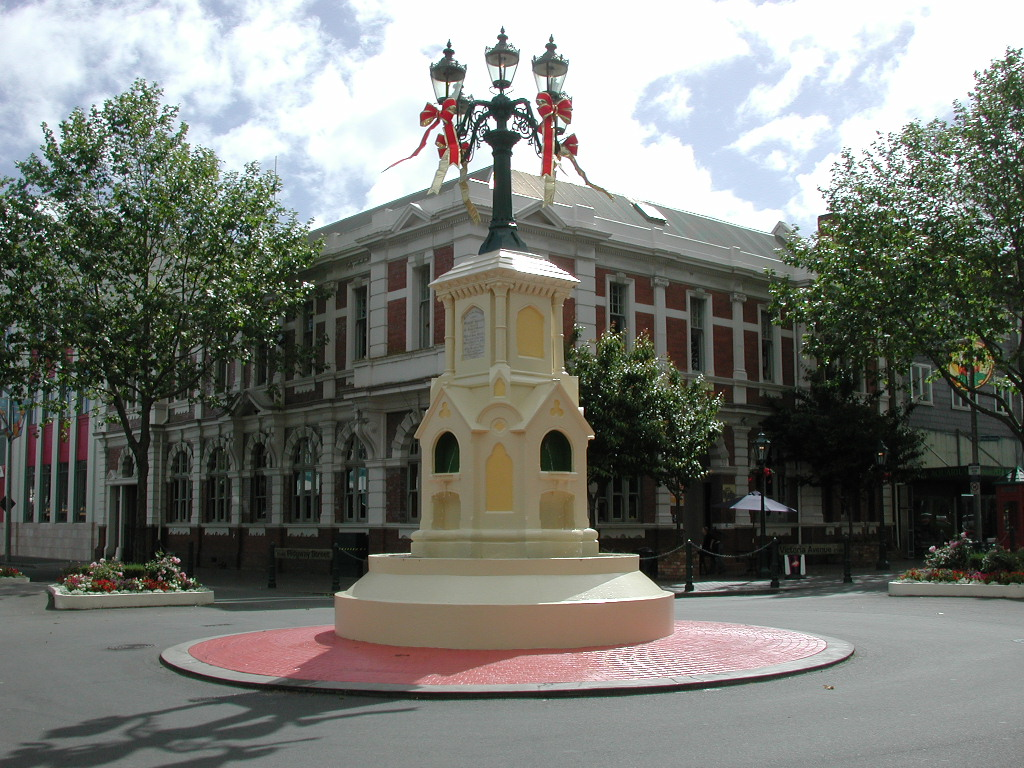
The Watt Fountain in Victoria Avenue. The fountain was built in honour of William Hogg Watt.

Hogg was elected as the first Mayor of Wanganui in 1872, serving until in 1881 when he was succeeded by Gilbert Carson.

New Zealand Parliament
Preceded by Robert Pharazyn	Member of Parliament for Rangitikei; 1866–68	Succeeded by William Fox
Preceded by John Bryce, John Ballance	Member of Parliament for Whanganui; 1881–84	Succeeded by John Ballance
