= Thorndon (electorate) =

Thorndon is a former parliamentary electorate in the city of Wellington, New Zealand, from 1881 to 1890.

== Population centres ==
The previous electoral redistribution was undertaken in 1875 for the 1875–1876 election. In the six years since, New Zealand's European population had increased by 65%. In the 1881 electoral redistribution, the House of Representatives increased the number of European representatives to 91 (up from 84 since the 1875–76 election). The number of Māori electorates was held at four. The House further decided that electorates should not have more than one representative, which led to 35 new electorates being formed, including Thorndon, and two electorates that had previously been abolished to be recreated. This necessitated a major disruption to existing boundaries.

The electorate was based on the inner-city suburb of Thorndon. The boundaries were defined as follows:

The district is bounded towards the West, North, and East by the limits of the Borough of Wellington, to a point in line with the continuation of Taranaki Street, thence by that line and street to Taranaki Place; towards the South by Taranaki Place, Dixon Street, Woolcombe Street, Mount Street, the road leading to and by Upland Farm, to the boundary of the borough.

== History ==
The Thorndon electorate was created for the 1881 election. The previous multi-member electorates, including the two-member Wellington electorate, were abolished. The changes were the result of the Representation Act 1881.

William Levin won the 1881 election against Thomas Dwan by 772 votes to 228. Since the 1879 election, Levin had represented the Wellington electorate. He resigned before the end of the parliamentary term 21 March 1884 due to ill health.

The resignation caused the 1884 by-election. At the nomination meeting, Thomas Dwan, Alfred Newman and Henry Bunny were proposed as candidates, with Dwan winning the show of hands. At the election on 14 May 1884, Newman, Bunny and Dwan received 636, 379 and 121 votes, respectively.

At the 1884 election, Newman was re-elected unopposed. At the 1887 election, Newman beat William McLean by 873 to 425 votes.

The Thorndon electorate was abolished at the end of the parliamentary term in 1890. Newman successfully contested the Hutt electorate in the 1890 election.

=== Election results ===
Thorndon was represented by two Members of Parliament.

Key

Independent

Elections	Winner
1881 election	William Levin
1884 by-election	Alfred Newman
1884 election	Alfred Newman
1887 election	Alfred Newman
