= Stanmore (New Zealand electorate) =

Stanmore was a parliamentary electorate in Christchurch, New Zealand, from 1881 to 1887. The electorate was represented by two Members of Parliament.

== Population centres ==
The previous electoral redistribution was undertaken in 1875 for the 1875–1876 election. In the six years since, New Zealand's European population had increased by 65%. In the 1881 electoral redistribution, the House of Representatives increased the number of European representatives to 91 (up from 84 since the 1875–76 election). The number of Māori electorates was held at four. The House further decided that electorates should not have more than one representative, which led to 35 new electorates being formed, including Stanmore, and two electorates that had previously been abolished to be recreated. This necessitated a major disruption to existing boundaries.

The electorate covered the north-eastern suburbs of Christchurch, including Richmond (then called Bingsland), Phillipstown, and St Albans (parts of which were then called Knightstown). The electorate derived its name from Stanmore Road, which is located in Richmond. Stanmore Road itself was named by an original landowner from Little Stanmore in the London Borough of Harrow.

== History ==
In the 1881 general election, the electorate was contested by Walter Pilliet, William Patten Cowlishaw (a partner of Francis James Garrick) and William Flesher (father of James Arthur Flesher). They received 383, 362 and 303 votes, respectively. Pilliet was declared elected with a majority of 21 votes.

Following a petition, the 1881 election was declared invalid. The resulting 12 July 1882 by-election was contested by Pilliet, Edward Richardson and Cowlishaw. They received 469, 345 and 244 votes, respectively. Pilliet was declared elected with a majority of 124 votes.

From March 1884, requests were put to the Mayor of Christchurch, Charles Hulbert, to contest the 1884 election for Parliament, either in the Stanmore or Christchurch North electorate. In late June, he announced that he would not accede to the request. The 1884 general election was contested by five candidates. The incumbent came a distant fourth place. Daniel Reese, George Ruddenklau, Dorney, Pilliet and Wansey received 524, 435, 142, 43 and 19 votes, respectively. The majority for Reese was 89 votes. There was some protest about the election, but this came to nothing and the result stood as declared.

In 1887 Reese was defeated and came third in the replacement electorate of Linwood by Andrew Loughrey.

=== Members of Parliament ===
Unless otherwise stated, all MPs terms began and ended at a general election.

Key

Independent

Election	Winner
1881 election	Walter Pilliet
1882 by-election	Walter Pilliet
1884 election	Daniel Reese

== Election results ==
=== 1882 Stanmore by-election ===
1882 Stanmore by-election
Party	Candidate	Votes	%	±%
Independent	Walter Pilliet	469	44.33	
Independent	Edward Richardson	345	32.61	
Independent	William Patten Cowlishaw	244	23.06	
Turnout		1,058		
Majority		124	11.72	
