= Moeraki (electorate) =

Moeraki was a parliamentary electorate in the Otago region of New Zealand, from 1881 to 1887.

== Population centres ==
The previous electoral redistribution was undertaken in 1875 for the 1875–1876 election. In the six years since, New Zealand's European population had increased by 65%. In the 1881 electoral redistribution, the House of Representatives increased the number of European representatives to 91 (up from 84 since the 1875–76 election). The number of Māori electorates was held at four. The House further decided that electorates should not have more than one representative, which led to 35 new electorates being formed, including Moeraki, and two electorates that had previously been abolished to be recreated. This necessitated a major disruption to existing boundaries.

The electorate was based on the settlement of Moeraki.

== History ==
Moeraki was established for the 1881 election and was abolished after two parliamentary terms in 1887. The electorate was represented by one Member of Parliament, John McKenzie. This was McKenzie's first time in Parliament.

The 1881 election was contested by McKenzie, William Henry Williams (Manager of the Shag Point Colliery) and William Murcott, who received 364, 165 and 130 votes, respectively. McKenzie thus won the election with an absolute majority.

In the 1884 election, McKenzie was challenged by Charles Haynes. McKenzie and Haynes received 389 and 273 votes, respectively.

After the Moeraki electorate was abolished, McKenzie successfully contested the Waihemo electorate in the 1887 election. He remained in Parliament until 1900, and in 1901 was appointed to the New Zealand Legislative Council shortly before his death.

=== Election results ===
Key

Independent

Election	Winner
1881 election	John McKenzie
1884 election	John McKenzie
