= Kumara (electorate) =

Kumara was a parliamentary electorate in the West Coast region of New Zealand, from 1881 to 1890.

== Population centres ==
The previous electoral redistribution was undertaken in 1875 for the 1875–1876 election. In the six years since, New Zealand's European population had increased by 65%. In the 1881 electoral redistribution, the House of Representatives increased the number of European representatives to 91 (up from 84 since the 1875–76 election). The number of Māori electorates was held at four. The House further decided that electorates should not have more than one representative, which led to 35 new electorates being formed, including Kumara, and two electorates that had previously been abolished to be recreated. This necessitated a major disruption to existing boundaries.

The electorate got its name from the town of Kumara. The northern boundary of the electorate was the Taramakau River over its entire length (i.e. up to Harper's Pass). The electorate was located between the Greymouth and Hokitika electorates. The eastern boundary was the old boundary between the Canterbury and Westland Provinces.

In the 1887 electoral redistribution, the northern boundary shifted further north, and Lake Brunner was gained.

== History ==
Kumara was established for the 1881 election and was abolished after three parliamentary terms in 1890. The electorate was represented by one Member of Parliament, the future Premier Richard Seddon, known as 'King Dick'. Seddon had previously, since the 1879 election, represented Hokitika. Following the abolition of the Kumara electorate, Seddon successfully stood in the Westland electorate in the 1890 election. He became Premier in 1893.

=== Members of Parliament ===
Key

Independent

Election	Winner
1881 election	Richard Seddon
1884 election	Richard Seddon
1887 election	Richard Seddon

== Election results ==
=== 1887 election ===
1887 general election, Kumara
Party	Candidate	Votes	%	±%
Independent	Richard Seddon	Unopposed		
Registered electors		1,816		

=== 1884 election ===
1884 general election, Kumara
Party	Candidate	Votes	%	±%
Independent	Richard Seddon	667	57.31	+4.33
Independent	Edwin Blake	497	42.69	−4.43
Majority		170	14.60	+8.86
Turnout		1,164	62.61	+4.21
Registered electors		1,859		

=== 1881 election ===
1881 general election, Kumara
Party	Candidate	Votes	%	±%
Independent	Richard Seddon	700	52.88	
Independent	Edwin Blake	624	47.12	
Majority		76	5.74	
Turnout		1,324	58.40	
Registered electors		2,267		
