= Wairarapa North =

Wairarapa North is a former New Zealand parliamentary electorate, from 1881 to 1887.

== Population centres ==
The previous electoral redistribution was undertaken in 1875 for the 1875–1876 election. In the six years since, New Zealand's European population had increased by 65%. In the 1881 electoral redistribution, the House of Representatives increased the number of European representatives to 91 (up from 84 since the 1875–76 election). The number of Māori electorates was held at four. The House further decided that electorates should not have more than one representative, which led to 35 new electorates being formed, including Wairarapa North, and two electorates that had previously been abolished to be recreated. This necessitated a major disruption to existing boundaries.

Wairarapa North was centred on the largest Wairarapa town of Masterton, with its southern boundary south of Masterton.

== History ==
The Wairarapa North electorate in the Wairarapa district of New Zealand and the adjacent Wairarapa South electorate were formed for the 1881 election by splitting the old Wairarapa electorate. These electorates existed for two elections from 1881 to 1887, when Wairarapa North was renamed Masterton, and Wairarapa South became the new Wairarapa electorate.

Between 1871 and 1881, the previous Wairarapa electorate had been a two-member electorate. In the 1871 election, one of the incumbents, Henry Bunny, who had represented Wairarapa since a by-election in 1865, was beaten by Walter Clarke Buchanan in the Wairarapa South electorate. The other incumbent, George Beetham, was challenged by Alfred Renall in the Wairarapa North electorate. Beetham and Renall received 670 and 351 votes, respectively, and Beetham was thus declared elected.

In the 1884 election, the incumbent Buchanan was challenged by William Wilson McCardle. Beetham and McCardle received 542 and 517 votes, respectively.

In 1887, when Wairarapa North was abolished, Beetham became the MP for the new Masterton electorate.

=== Election results ===
Wairarapa North was represented by one MP for all six years.

Key

Independent

Election	Winner
1881 election	George Beetham
1884 election	George Beetham
