= Theophilus Daniel =

New Zealand politician

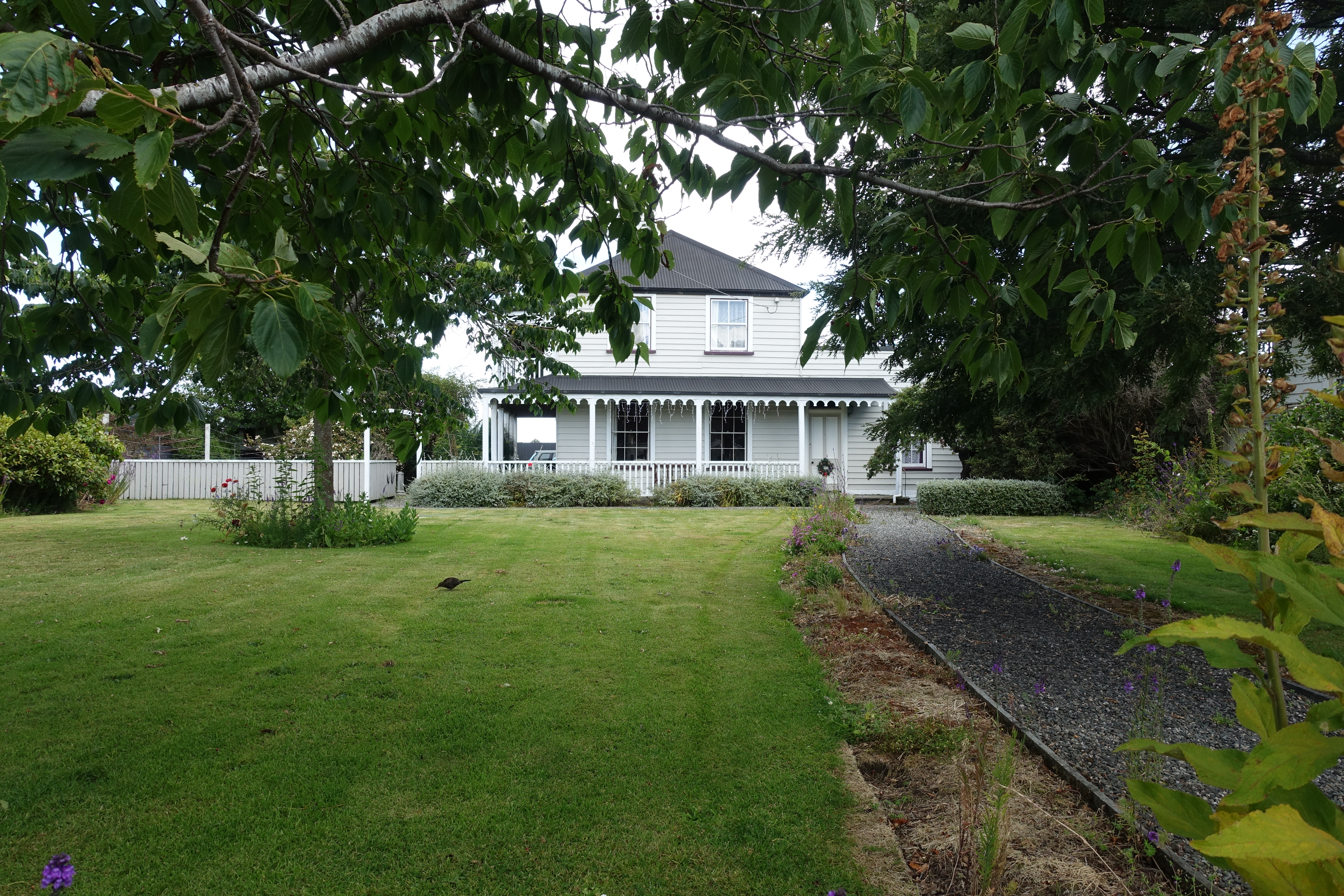
Daniel House in Riverton in 2018

New Zealand Parliament
Years	Term	Electorate	Party
1881–1884	8th	Wallace	Independent

Theophilus Alfred James Daniel (1817 – 22 March 1893) was a 19th-century Member of Parliament from Southland, New Zealand.

He represented the Wallace electorate from 1881 to 1884, when he was defeated.

He was from Hastings, Sussex, England, and came to Foveaux Strait via New South Wales. He had been on the Southland and Otago Provincial Councils. He died at Otaitai Bush and his funeral was held in Riverton on 26 March 1893.

Daniel married Elizabeth Stevens, the half-sister of John Howell, the founder of Riverton. His building in Riverton's main street, known as Daniel House, is registered with Heritage New Zealand as a Category II structure.

Political offices
Preceded by David Murchie	Mayor of Riverton; 1879; 1880–1881	Succeeded by James Reid
Preceded by James Reid	Mayor of Riverton; 1879; 1880–1881	Succeeded by John R. Mills
New Zealand Parliament
Preceded by Henry Hirst	Member of Parliament for Wallace; 1881–1884	Succeeded by Henry Hirst
