= Auckland North =

Auckland North was a parliamentary electorate in Auckland, New Zealand, from 1881 to 1890.

== Population centres ==
The previous electoral redistribution was undertaken in 1875 for the 1875–1876 election. In the six years since, New Zealand's European population had increased by 65%. In the 1881 electoral redistribution, the House of Representatives increased the number of European representatives to 91 (up from 84 since the 1875–76 election). The number of Māori electorates was held at four. The House further decided that electorates should not have more than one representative, which led to 35 new electorates being formed, including Auckland North, and two electorates that had previously been abolished to be recreated. This necessitated a major disruption to existing boundaries.

The area that was covered comprised what is today the central business district.

== History ==
Four people were nominated for the 1881 election: William Lee Rees, who had previously represented Auckland East, Thomas Peacock, William George Garrard, and Thomas Thwaites. Thwaites soon withdrew from the contest, and Peacock narrowly defeated Rees, with Garrard coming a distant third.

In the 1884 election, Peacock successfully stood in the Newton electorate. Thomas Thompson and Joseph Newman contested Auckland North in 1884, with Thompson achieving a decisive win.

Three people were nominated for the 1887 election: the incumbent, Thompson; Samuel Vaile, a merchant and land agent, and Harry Farnall. The latter withdrew before the election, and Thompson achieved a narrow win over Vaile. Thompson represented Auckland North until its abolition in 1890.

=== Members of Parliament ===
The electorate was represented by two Members of Parliament.

Key

Independent

Election	Winner
1881 election	Thomas Peacock
1884 election	Thomas Thompson
1887 election	Thomas Thompson

== Election results ==
=== 1887 election ===
1887 general election: Auckland North
Party	Candidate	Votes	%	±%
Independent	Thomas Thompson	743	51.21	−27.99
Independent	Samuel Vaile	708	48.79	
Majority		35	2.41	−55.98
Turnout		1,451	63.53	−1.17
Registered electors		2,284		

=== 1884 election ===
1884 general election: Auckland North
Party	Candidate	Votes	%	±%
Independent	Thomas Thompson	746	79.19	
Independent	Joseph Newman	196	20.81	
Majority		550	58.39	+54.51
Turnout		942	64.70	+0.03
Registered electors		1,456		

=== 1881 election ===
1881 general election: Auckland North
Party	Candidate	Votes	%	±%
Independent	Thomas Peacock	346	51.64	
Independent	William Lee Rees	320	47.76	
Independent	William George Garrard	4	0.60	
Majority		26	3.88	
Turnout		670	64.67	
Registered electors		1,036		
