= Foxton (electorate) =

Foxton is a former parliamentary electorate in the Manawatū-Whanganui and Wellington regions of New Zealand, from 1881 to 1890.

== Population centres ==
The previous electoral redistribution was undertaken in 1875 for the 1875–1876 election. In the six years since, New Zealand's European population had increased by 65%. In the 1881 electoral redistribution, the House of Representatives increased the number of European representatives to 91 (up from 84 since the 1875–76 election). The number of Māori electorates was held at four. The House further decided that electorates should not have more than one representative, which led to 35 new electorates being formed, including Foxton, and two electorates that had previously been abolished to be recreated. This necessitated a major disruption to existing boundaries.

== History ==
The Foxton electorate was established for the 1881 election. The election was contested by James Wilson, Charles Beard Izard, Walter Buller, George Warren Russell, Alfred Newman, and W. France; Wilson won the election and was re-elected at the two subsequent elections. When the electorate was abolished in 1890, Wilson successfully contested the Palmerston electorate in the 1890 election.

=== Election results ===
Foxton was represented by one Member of Parliament.

Key

Independent

Election	Winner
1881 election	James Wilson
1884 election	James Wilson
1887 election	James Wilson
