= John Buchanan (New Zealand politician) =

Member of Parliament from the Hawke's Bay Region of New Zealand

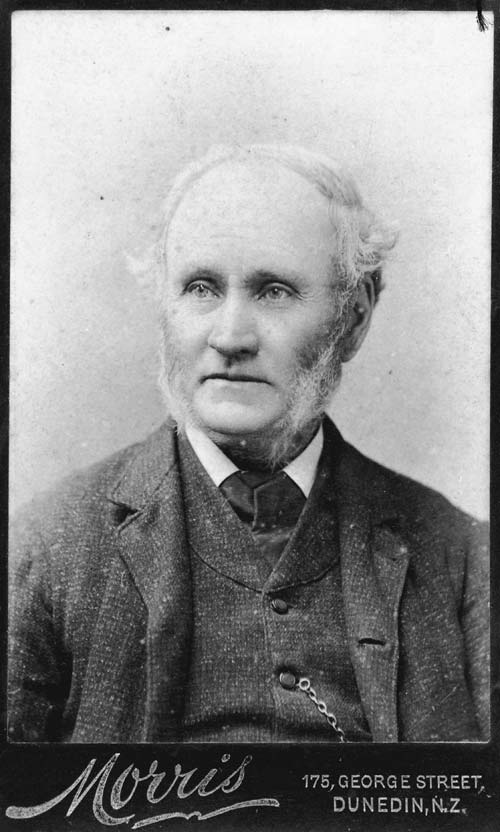
John Buchanan was approx 75 years old at the time this photograph was taken in Dunedin, New Zealand.

New Zealand Parliament
Years	Term	Electorate	Party
1881–1884	8th	Napier	Independent

John Buchanan (1819–1892) was a nineteenth-century Member of Parliament from the Hawke's Bay region of New Zealand.

He represented the Napier electorate from 1881 to 1884, when he retired.

New Zealand Parliament
Preceded by Fred Sutton, William Russell	Member of Parliament for Napier; 1881–1884	Succeeded by John Davies Ormond
