= Hokonui (electorate) =

Hokonui was a parliamentary electorate in the Southland region of New Zealand, from 1881 to 1890.

== Population centres ==
The previous electoral redistribution was undertaken in 1875 for the 1875–1876 election. In the six years since, New Zealand's European population had increased by 65%. In the 1881 electoral redistribution, the House of Representatives increased the number of European representatives to 91 (up from 84 since the 1875–76 election). The number of Māori electorates was held at four. The House further decided that electorates should not have more than one representative, which led to 35 new electorates being formed, including Hokonui, and two electorates that had previously been abolished to be recreated. This necessitated a major disruption to existing boundaries.

The electorate included the Hokonui Hills, the range of hills which rise above the Southland Plains, of which the hills mark a northern extremity.

== History ==
The Hokonui electorate in the Southland Region of New Zealand was formed for the 1881 election. The 1881 election was contested by Henry Driver, Cuthbert Cowan and Peter Finn, who obtained 527, 431, and 121 votes, respectively. Driver was thus declared elected. Driver had previously represented the Roslyn electorate for four parliamentary terms. Cowan had represented the Wallace in 1869 following a by-election for only a few months. Peter Finn, a supporter of the previous Premier George Grey, was a barrister and solicitor from Invercargill who had previously been a politician in Victoria.

The 1884 election was contested by Cowan, Frank Stephen Canning, Justus Hobbs, and Thomas James Lumsden (a son of George Lumsden). Cowan, Canning, Hobbs and Lumsden received 557, 286, 52 and 5 votes, respectively.

In the 1887 election, Cowan was challenged by Alfred Baldey, a farmer from Ryal Bush who was prominent in local Southland politics. Cowan and Baldey received 649 and 593 votes, respectively.

At the end of the parliamentary term in 1890, the Hokonui electorate was abolished and Cowan retired from Parliament.

=== Election results ===
Hokonui was represented by two Members of Parliament.

Key

Independent

Election	Winner
1881 election	Henry Driver
1884 election	Cuthbert Cowan
1887 election	Cuthbert Cowan
