= Hugh McIlraith =

New Zealand politician

New Zealand Parliament
Years	Term	Electorate	Party
1881–1884	8th	Cheviot	Independent

Hugh McIlraith was a 19th-century Member of Parliament from Canterbury, New Zealand.

He represented the Cheviot electorate from 1881 to 1884, when he retired.

New Zealand Parliament
Preceded by Alfred Saunders	Member of Parliament for Cheviot; 1881–1884	Succeeded by James Dupré Lance
