= Dunedin East =

Dunedin East was a parliamentary electorate in the city of Dunedin in the Otago region of New Zealand from 1881 to 1890.

== Population centres ==
The previous electoral redistribution was undertaken in 1875 for the 1875–1876 election. In the six years since, New Zealand's European population had increased by 65%. In the 1881 electoral redistribution, the House of Representatives increased the number of European representatives to 91 (up from 84 since the 1875–76 election). The number of Māori electorates was held at four. The House further decided that electorates should not have more than one representative, which led to 35 new electorates being formed, including Dunedin East, and two electorates that had previously been abolished to be recreated. This necessitated a major disruption to existing boundaries.

== History ==
Dunedin East is one of the electorates that replaced the three-member City of Dunedin electorate. The other two electorates formed in 1881 were Dunedin Central and Peninsula.

=== Members of Parliament ===
The electorate was represented by three Members of Parliament:

Key

Independent

Election	Winner
1881 election	Matthew Green
1884 election	Robert Stout
1887 election	James Allen

== Election results ==
=== 1887 election ===
1887 general election: Dunedin East
Party	Candidate	Votes	%	±%
Independent	James Allen	889	50.82	
Independent	Sir Robert Stout	860	49.18	−10.27
Majority		29	1.65	
Turnout		1,749	78.32	+7.69
Registered electors		2,233		

=== 1884 election ===
1884 general election: Dunedin East
Party	Candidate	Votes	%	±%
Independent	Robert Stout	755	59.45	
Independent	Matthew Green	515	40.55	
Majority		240	18.89	
Turnout		1,270	70.63	
Registered electors		1,798		
