= 1881 New Zealand general election =

General election

1881 general election
- 8 (Māori) & 9 (general) December 1881

All 95 seats in the House of Representatives
- Turnout: 66.5%
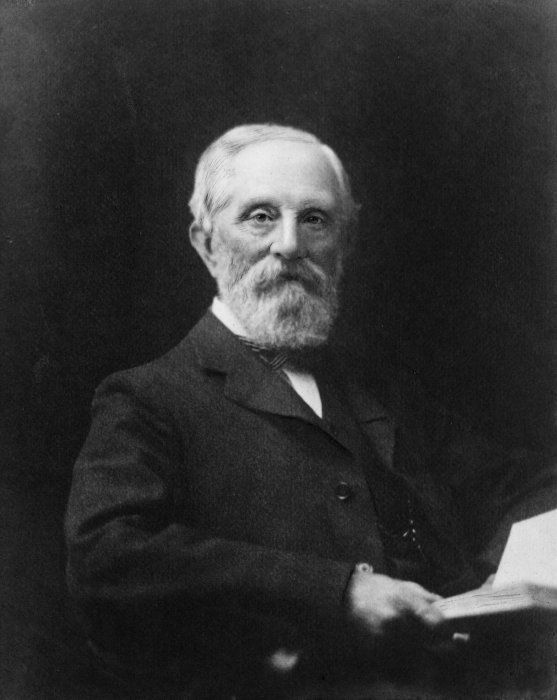

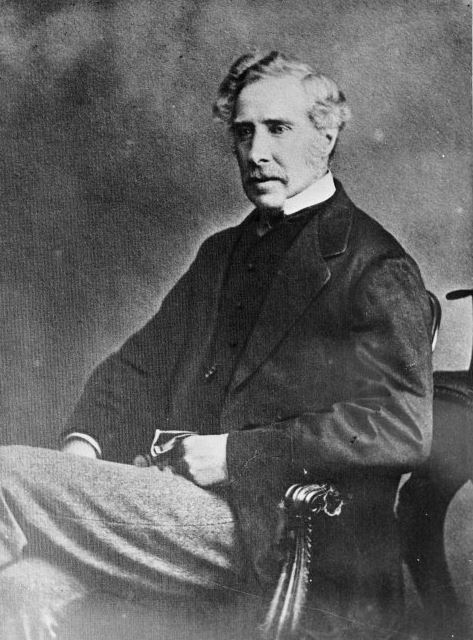
	First party	Second party
Leader	John Hall	George Grey
Party	Conservative Independents	Greyite Independents
Leader since	1879	1877
Leader's seat	Selwyn	Auckland East
Seats won	45	39
Seat change	0	▼2
Popular vote	N/A	N/A
Percentage	N/A	N/A
Swing	N/A	N/A
Premier before election
John Hall
Independent
Subsequent Premier
John Hall
Independent

The 1881 New Zealand general election was held on 8 and 9 December in the Māori and European electorates, respectively, to elect 95 MPs to the 8th session of the New Zealand Parliament.

1881 was the first time a general election was held under universal male suffrage; all MPs were elected in single-member electorates; and the country quota was introduced, allowing rural electorates to have 25% fewer voters than urban electorates. Beginning with the 1881 election, all elections in European electorates were to be held on the same day, a measure not introduced for Māori electorates until 1951.

== 1881 electoral redistribution ==
The previous electoral redistribution was undertaken in 1875 for the 1875–1876 election. In the six years since, New Zealand's European population had increased by 65%. In the 1881 electoral redistribution, the House of Representatives increased the number of European representatives to 91 (up from 84 since the 1875–76 election). The number of Māori electorates was held at four. The House further decided that electorates should not have more than one representative, which led to 35 new electorates being formed: Ashburton, Auckland North, Awarua, Christchurch North, Christchurch South, Coromandel, Dunedin Central, Dunedin East, Dunedin South, Dunedin West, Foxton, Franklin North, Franklin South, Hawke's Bay, Hokonui, Inangahua, Kumara, Lincoln, Manukau, Moeraki, Peninsula, St Albans, Stanmore, Sydenham, Taranaki, Tauranga, Te Aro, Thorndon, Waimate, Waipawa, Wairarapa North, Wairarapa South, Waitotara, Wakanui, and Wellington South. In addition, two electorates that had previously been abolished were recreated: Bay of Islands and Oamaru.

These changes necessitated a major disruption to existing boundaries. Only six electorates remained unchanged: Waikato, Waipa, Bruce, Lyttelton, Nelson, and Picton.

The electoral distribution was the first that formally acknowledged the existence of a country quota, where country electorates contained 25% fewer voters than town electorates.

== The election ==
The 1881 election was held on Thursday, 8 December, in the Māori electorates and on Friday, 9 December, in the European electorates to elect a total of 95 MPs to the 8th Parliament. A total number of 120,972 (66.5%) voters turned out to vote. In 11 seats there was only one candidate. 36 and 55 seats were in the North Island and South Island, respectively, plus the 4 Māori electorates.

The incumbent government led by John Hall retained office having support from 45 members with 39 "Greyites" (supporters of George Grey) and 11 Independents not affiliated with either faction.

== Results ==
The following table shows the successful candidate for each electorate.

Member	Electorate	Affiliation	MP's term
William Montgomery	Akaroa	Greyite	Fourth
Edward George Wright	Ashburton	Greyite	Second
William Fisher Pearson	Ashley	Greyite	First
George Grey	Auckland East	Greyite	Fourth
Thomas Peacock	Auckland North	Independent	First
Joseph Dargaville	Auckland West	Independent	First
William Rolleston	Avon	Conservative	Fifth
James Parker Joyce	Awarua	Greyite	Second
Richard Hobbs	Bay of Islands	Conservative	Second
James Rutherford	Bruce	Independent	First
John Munro	Buller	Independent Liberal	First
William Barron	Caversham	Greyite	Second
Hugh McIlraith	Cheviot	Conservative	First
Henry Thomson	Christchurch North	Conservative	First
John Holmes	Christchurch South	Greyite	First
James William Thomson	Clutha	Conservative	Fourth
David McMillan	Coleridge	Conservative	First
Alfred Cadman	Coromandel	Greyite	First
Thomas Bracken	Dunedin Central	Greyite	First
Matthew Green	Dunedin East	Independent	First
Henry Fish	Dunedin South	Independent	First
Thomas Dick	Dunedin West	Conservative	Fourth
Vincent Pyke	Dunstan	Greyite	Fourth
Allan McDonald	East Coast	Greyite	Second
Joseph Tole	Eden	Greyite	Third
Harry Atkinson	Egmont	Conservative	Sixth
James Wilson	Foxton	Conservative	First
Benjamin Harris	Franklin North	Greyite	Second
Ebenezer Hamlin	Franklin South	Greyite	Third
William Postlethwaite	Geraldine	Conservative	First
James Sutter	Gladstone	Independent	First
Joseph Petrie	Greymouth	Conservative	First
Fred Sutton	Hawkes Bay	Conservative	Third
Henry Wynn-Williams	Heathcote	Conservative	First
Gerard George Fitzgerald	Hokitika	Conservative	First
Henry Driver	Hokonui	Conservative	Fifth
Thomas Mason	Hutt	Conservative	Second
Thomas S. Weston	Inangahua	Conservative	Second
Henry Feldwick	Invercargill	Greyite	Second
Isaac Wilson	Kaiapoi	Conservative	First
Richard Seddon	Kumara	Greyite	Second
Arthur O'Callaghan	Lincoln	Conservative	First
Harry Allwright	Lyttelton	Conservative	Second
Walter Johnston	Manawatu	Conservative	Fourth
Maurice O'Rorke	Manukau	Independent	Sixth
Edwin Mitchelson	Marsden	Conservative	First
Francis Wallace Mackenzie	Mataura	Greyite	First
John McKenzie	Moeraki	Greyite	First
Richmond Hursthouse	Motueka	Conservative	Third
Cecil de Lautour	Mount Ida	Greyite	Third
John Buchanan	Napier	Greyite	First
Henry Levestam	Nelson	Greyite	Second
Thomas Kelly	New Plymouth	Conservative	Fifth
William Swanson	Newton	Conservative	Fourth
Samuel Shrimski	Oamaru	Greyite	Third
Frederick Moss	Parnell	Greyite	Third
James Seaton	Peninsula	Greyite	Second
Edward Connoly	Picton	Conservative	First
James Macandrew	Port Chalmers	Greyite	Eighth
Jack Stevens	Rangitikei	Independent Liberal	First
Seymour Thorne George	Rodney	Greyite	Third
John Bathgate	Roslyn	Greyite	Second
John Hall	Selwyn	Conservative	Fifth
John Evans Brown	St Albans	Greyite	Third
Walter Pilliet	Stanmore	Conservative	First
William White	Sydenham	Greyite	First
James Fulton	Taieri	Conservative	Second
Robert Trimble	Taranaki	Conservative	Second
George Morris	Tauranga	Conservative	Second
Charles John Johnston	Te Aro	Conservative	First
John Sheehan	Thames	Independent	Fourth
William Levin	Thorndon	Conservative	Second
Richard Turnbull	Timaru	Greyite	Third
James Clark Brown	Tuapeka	Greyite	Fifth
John Blair Whyte	Waikato	Conservative	Second
James Green	Waikouaiti	Conservative	Second
William Steward	Waimate	Conservative	Second
Joseph Shephard	Waimea	Greyite	Third
Frederick Alexander Whitaker	Waipa	Conservative	Second
William Cowper Smith	Waipawa	Independent Liberal	First
George Beetham	Wairarapa North	Conservative	Third
Wally Buchanan	Wairarapa South	Conservative	First
Henry Dodson	Wairau	Greyite	First
Tom Duncan	Waitaki	Greyite	First
William John Hurst	Waitemata	Conservative	Second
John Bryce	Waitotara	Conservative	Fifth
Cathcart Wason	Wakanui	Conservative	Second
Thomas Fergus	Wakatipu	Conservative	First
Theophilus Daniel	Wallace	Greyite	First
William Hogg Watt	Wanganui	Conservative	Second
William Hutchison	Wellington South	Greyite	Second
Henare Tomoana	Eastern Maori	Conservative	Third
Hone Tawhai	Northern Maori	Greyite	Second
Hori Kerei Taiaroa	Southern Maori	Greyite	Fourth
Wiremu Te Wheoro	Western Maori	Greyite	Second
