= Matthew Green (New Zealand politician) =

New Zealand politician

New Zealand Parliament
| Years | Term | Electorate | Party |
|---|---|---|---|
| 1881–1884 | 8th | Dunedin East | Independent |

Matthew Wood Green (1840 – 29 September 1914) was a 19th-century Member of Parliament from Dunedin, New Zealand.

He represented the Dunedin East electorate from 1881 to 1884, when he was defeated.

New Zealand Parliament
| New constituency | Member of Parliament for Dunedin East; 1881–1884 | Succeeded by Robert Stout |
