= 1892 Rangitikei by-election =

New Zealand by-election

- 8 July 1892
- Turnout: 2,127

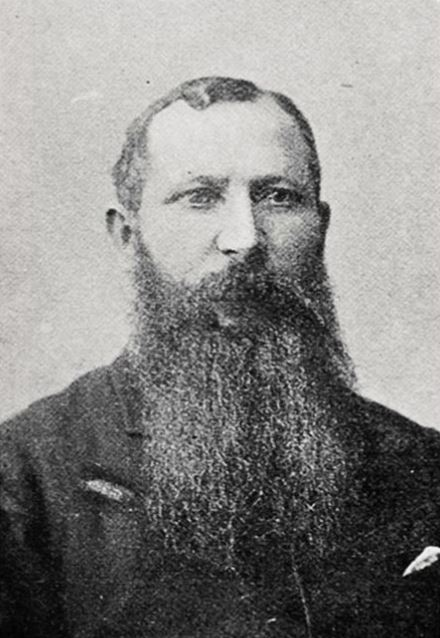
Candidate	Robert Bruce	Jack Stevens
Party	Conservative	Independent Liberal
Popular vote	1,094	1,033
Percentage	51.43	48.57
Member before election
Douglas Macarthur
Conservative
Elected Member
Robert Bruce
Conservative

The 1892 Rangitikei by-election was a by-election held during the 11th New Zealand Parliament in the Rangitikei electorate of the North Island. This was the fifth by-election since the Rangitikei electorate was established for the 1861 election. The previous by-election took place in 1880 and the following one took place in 1909. Robert Bruce, who had previously been the MP for Rangitikei between 1884 and 1890, won the by-election narrowly.

This was the last election in Rangitikei and the fifth last election overall in New Zealand in which there was no universal suffrage. The Electoral Act 1893 extended voting rights to all women aged 21 and over.

== Background ==
Robert Bruce, an independent, had previously been the MP for Rangitikei between 1884 and 1890. In 1890 he contested the election for the Waitotara electorate in South Taranaki, but was beaten by incumbent George Hutchison. The Rangitikei electorate, meanwhile, was won by Douglas Hastings Macarthur, but Macarthur died on 24 May 1892. Macarthur's death resulted in a by-election which took place on 8 July 1892.

The two candidates for this by-election were Robert Bruce, a previous MP and conservationist, and Jack Stevens, also a previous MP for Rangitikei between 1881 and 1884. Bruce was a candidate for the opposition and Stevens was an Independent Liberal as the Liberal Party was reluctant to endorse him in light of the recent Bruce by-election in which the candidate the Liberal Party endorsed lost by a large margin. Furthermore, the result was regarded as "a foregone conclusion in favour of Mr Bruce".

== Results ==
1892 Rangitikei by-election
Party	Candidate	Votes	%	±%
Conservative	Robert Bruce	1,094	51.43	
Independent Liberal	John Stevens	1,033	48.57	
Majority		61	2.87	
Turnout		2,127		

The by-election was much closer than what was expected as Bruce won by 61 votes, a margin of less than 3%. After the election results were announced at the Club Hotel in Marton both candidates gave speeches and enjoyed a whisky together.

Bruce would never go on to win another election, as he temporarily retired in 1893 and lost to Stevens in the Manawatu electorate in both 1896 and 1899.

== See also ==
- List of New Zealand by-elections
- Rangitikei by-election (disambiguation), other by-elections for the Rangitikei electorate
