= 1891 Te Aroha by-election =

New Zealand by-election

| ← 1890 general | 9 July 1891 | electorate abolished → |
- Turnout: 1,437
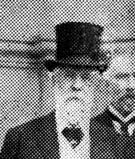

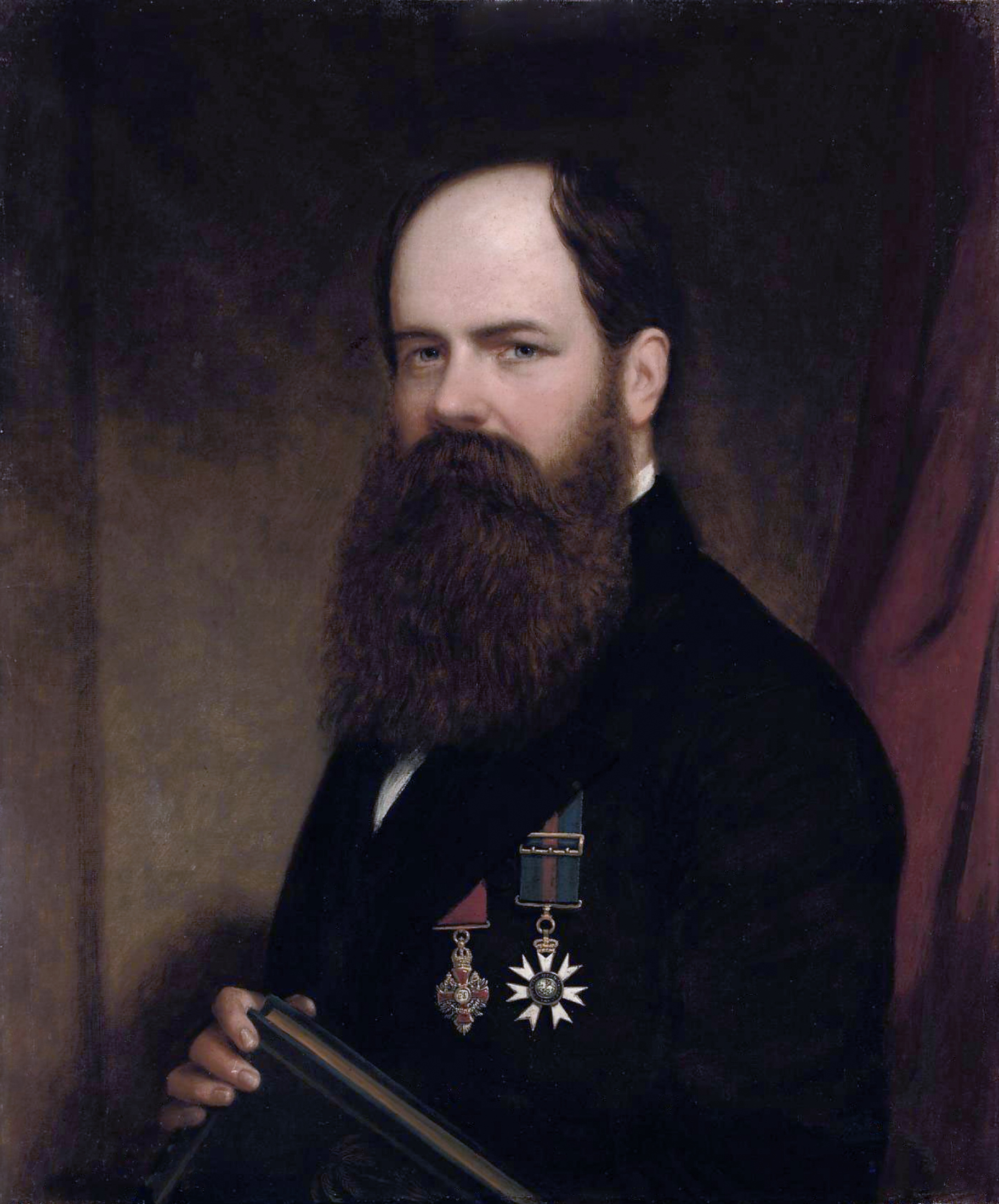
| Candidate | William Fraser | Walter Buller |
| Party | Liberal | Liberal |
| Popular vote | 875 | 523 |
| Percentage | 60.89 | 36.40 |
Member before election
William Shepherd Allen
Independent
Elected Member
William Fraser
Liberal

The 1891 Te Aroha by-election was a by-election held on 9 July 1891 during the 11th New Zealand Parliament in the Waikato electorate of Te Aroha. The 1890 general election in the Te Aroha electorate had been contested by William Shepherd Allen and William Fraser. Allen was elected, but Fraser mounted a successful election petition, and Allen was disqualified from standing again. The by-election was contested by Fraser and Sir Walter Buller, the well known ornithologist, who both represented the Liberal Party, plus a third candidate who was not taken seriously. Shortly before the election, the Liberal Government made Fraser its official candidate. A candidate representing the opposition pulled out of the contest in late June, as it was clear that only a Liberal Party supporter could win. Fraser won the by-election, obtaining more than 60% of the votes.

== Background ==
The Te Aroha electorate was first formed for the 11th New Zealand Parliament in 1890. William Shepherd Allen and William Fraser contested the 1890 election. Allen had a majority of 235 votes and was declared elected. Fraser petitioned against the election on three grounds: that Allen (who at the time of the election was overseas) had not given his consent to being nominated, that scrutineers had not been appointed by Allen in writing, and charges of bribery, corruption and treating of Allen's agents. The case was heard over two and a half days by Chief Justice James Prendergast and by Justice Edward Conolly. They issued their judgement on 3 April 1891, and declared that Allen's nomination was legal, charges of bribery or corruption were not proven, but that T. O. Hammond having been a paid agent of Allen was in violation of the Corrupt Practices Prevention Act, 1881, and the election was thus declared void. There was then legal argument that Fraser should be declared duly elected instead, but Justice Conolly rejected this, stating that it was up to the House of Representatives to decide on that. The judges disqualified Allen from standing in the Te Aroha electorate for 12 months, but he could contest by-elections in other electorates should they arise. Allen regretted that he could not contest the upcoming by-election. Some of his friends decided to petition parliament to have the disqualification overturned. The Public Petition Committee reported to the House on 10 July (i.e. the day after the by-election) and recommended that the Government pass a bill to remove the stigma of disqualification.

The following table gives the final 1890 election results:

1890 general election: Te Aroha
| Party | Candidate | Votes | % | ±% |
|---|---|---|---|---|
| Independent | William Shepherd Allen | 786 | 56.34 | |
| Liberal | William Fraser | 609 | 43.65 | |
| Majority | | 175 | 12.54 | |
| Turnout | | 1,395 | 48.60 | |
| Registered electors | | 2,870 | | |

== Candidates ==
Various potential candidates were approached by the electors and discussed in the newspapers. Fraser, a supporter of the Liberal Party, confirmed that he would contest the by-election on 15 April, after it had previously been reported that he would not stand again. William Herries of Shaftesbury in Piako County was asked to become a candidate in April. Joseph Dargaville, who had previously represented the Auckland West electorate, was discussed as a probable candidate, and the potential candidacy of Sir Maurice O'Rorke, who after 29 years in Parliament had been defeated at the 1890 election, was rumoured. The lawyer and ornithologist Walter Buller, who had previously been unsuccessful in the 1876 and 1881 elections, started canvassing in the electorate as a supporter of the Liberal Government during April. William McCullough, a former Mayor of Thames, was asked in mid June to stand in the upcoming by-election. William Murray, who had until 1881 represented the Te Aroha electorate, was understood to be a candidate for the opposition to the ruling Liberal Government. Dr. Charles Broome of Huntly announced his candidacy in late June, but his nomination was regarded as a "joke" by the local newspaper, the Thames Star. Lemuel Bagnall was another candidate. He retired from the contest in late June, as the public showed strong support for the government, and that as opposition candidate he would not find sufficient support.

== Election ==
Nominations were received by 29 June from Fraser, Buller, and Broome. On 1 July, the government decided to make Fraser its official candidate. The by-election was held on 9 July 1891 and was won by Fraser. The following table gives the election results:

1891 Te Aroha by-election
| Party | Candidate | Votes | % | ±% |
|---|---|---|---|---|
| Liberal | William Fraser | 875 | 60.89 | +17.24 |
| Independent Liberal | Walter Buller | 523 | 36.40 | |
| Independent | Charles Broome | 12 | 0.84 | |
| Informal votes | | 27 | 1.88 | |
| Majority | | 352 | 24.50 | |
| Turnout | | 1,437 | 50.06 | +1.46 |
| Registered electors | | 2,870 | | |

Fraser represented the electorate until the end of the parliamentary term in 1893, when the electorate was abolished again.
