= 11th New Zealand Parliament =

Term of the Parliament of New Zealand

11th Parliament of New Zealand
←	10th Parliament	12th Parliament	→

Overview
- Legislative body: New Zealand Parliament
- Term: 23 January 1891 – 6 October 1893
- Election: 1890 New Zealand general election
- Government: Liberal Government

House of Representatives
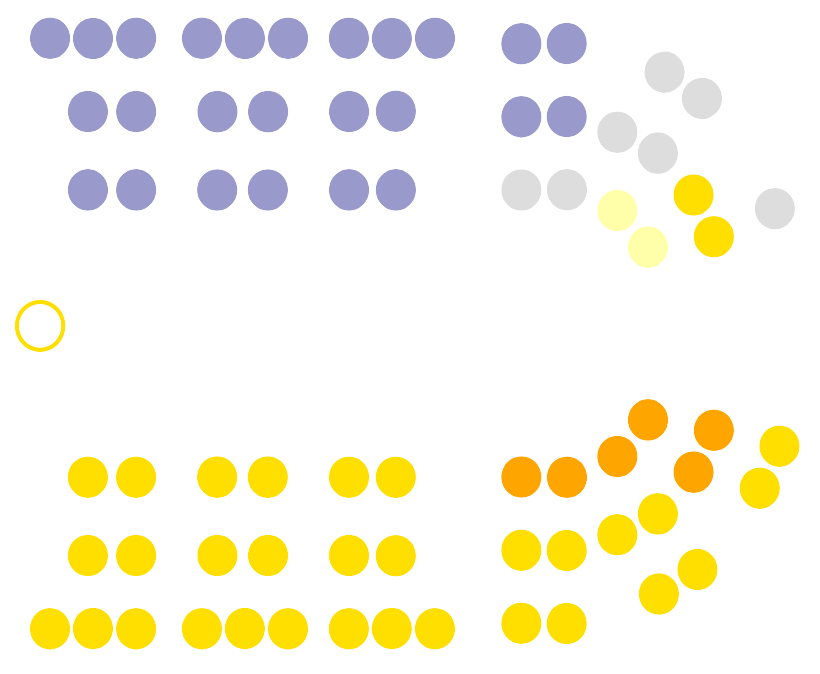
- Members: 74
- Speaker of the House: William Steward
- Premier: Richard Seddon — John Ballance until 27 April 1893†
- Leader of the Opposition: William Rolleston — John Bryce until 31 August 1891

Legislative Council
- Members: 46
- Speaker of the Council: Henry Miller — Harry Atkinson until 28 June 1892†

Sovereign
- Monarch: HM Victoria
- Governor: HE Rt. Hon. The Earl of Glasgow from 6 June 1892 — HE Rt. Hon. The Earl of Onslow until 25 February 1892

The 11th New Zealand Parliament was a term of the Parliament of New Zealand.

Elections for this term were held in 4 Māori electorates and 62 European electorates on 27 November and 5 December 1890, respectively. A total of 74 MPs were elected – a reduction on the 95 MPs of the previous Parliament.

== Sessions ==
The 11th Parliament opened on 23 January 1891, following the 1890 general election. It sat for four sessions (with two sessions in 1891), and was prorogued on 8 November 1893.

Session	Opened	Adjourned
first	23 January 1891	30 January 1891
second	11 June 1891	25 September 1891
third	23 June 1892	11 October 1892
fourth	22 June 1893	6 October 1893

== Party standings ==
=== Start of Parliament ===
Party	Leader(s)	Seats at start
Liberal Party	John Ballance	34
Conservative	John Bryce	25
Independents		9
Liberal-Labour		5
Independent Liberal		2

=== End of Parliament ===
Party	Leader(s)	Seats at end
Liberal Party	Richard Seddon	34
Conservative	William Rolleston	24
Independents		9
Liberal-Labour		6
Independent Liberal		2

== Historical context ==
In December 1887, the House of Representatives voted to reduce its membership from general electorates from 91 to 70. The 1890 electoral redistribution used the same 1886 census data used for the 1887 electoral redistribution. In addition, three-member electorates were introduced in the four main centres. This resulted in a major restructuring of electorates, with 12 new electorates created. Of those, four electorates were created for the first time: Te Aroha, Halswell, Dunedin Suburbs, and Palmerston. The remaining eight electorates had previously existed and were re-created through the 1890 electoral redistribution: City of Auckland, City of Christchurch, City of Dunedin, City of Wellington, Ellesmere, Franklin, Geraldine, and Westland.

The 11th Parliament was most significant, as following the 1890 general election, it marked the beginning of party politics in New Zealand with the formation of the Liberal Government, which was to enact major welfare, labour and electoral reforms, including giving the vote to women.

== Ministries ==
The fourth Atkinson Ministry, known as the Scarecrow Ministry, had been the government. The election had returned several "Independent" or "Labour" members as well as the Liberals. Some of Atkinson's conservative colleagues proposed schemes that would keep him in office, but Atkinson, who had been Premier on and off for 14 years, announced that the house would be called on 23 January 1891 to decide. On 21 January Atkinson told his colleagues that he was retiring on doctor's orders, resigned his seat and was sworn into the Legislative Council, and appointed Speaker. When William Rolleston lost the ministerial nomination for Speaker, Edwin Mitchelson announced the resignation of the government. The Governor asked John Ballance to form a government, which he did on 24 January. It was found to have a majority in the house. After a week of debate, the house went into recess until June.

Atkinson was appointed to the Council with six colleagues, on 20 or 22 January 1891. He was widely regarded as having stacked the council before leaving office. There was a 5000-signature petition against the appointments, but they were approved by the Governor, The Earl of Onslow. The seven appointments on 20 or 22 January to the Council were Atkinson himself plus Charles Bowen, James Fulton, Charles Johnston, John Davies Ormond, William Downie Stewart Sr and John Blair Whyte.

Ballance had considerable difficulty in achieving reform of the Legislative Council, with new appointments to be for seven years rather than life, and he had major disagreements with the Governor. Ballance's victory is seen as establishing an important precedent in the relationship between Governor and Prime Minister.

The Ballance Ministry was the beginning of the Liberal Government, which lasted until 1912. John Ballance died suddenly on 27 April 1893 and whilst Ballance had favoured Robert Stout as his successor, the caucus selected Richard Seddon instead. The Seddon Ministry was in power from 1 May 1893 until 10 June 1906, when Seddon in turn died.

== Initial composition of the 11th Parliament ==
74 seats were created across 66 electorates.

While the Liberal party was the only established party structure at the time, many independent conservative MPs coalesced as a semi-formal conservative opposition under the leadership of John Bryce. Due to the loose nature of this grouping it is difficult to determine the affiliation of some Independent MPs.

Party	Name	Electorate	Term
Liberal	John Joyce	Akaroa	Second
Conservative	Edward George	Ashburton	Third
Liberal	Richard Meredith	Ashley	First
Liberal	William Rees	City of Auckland	Second
Liberal	John Shera	City of Auckland	First
Liberal	Thomas Thompson	City of Auckland	Third
Liberal	Edwin Blake	Avon	Third
Liberal	Joseph Ward	Awarua	Second
Liberal	Robert Houston	Bay of Islands	First
Conservative	James Thomson	Bruce	Sixth
Independent	Eugene O'Conor	Buller	Fourth
Liberal	Westby Perceval	City of Christchurch	Second
Liberal	William Reeves	City of Christchurch	Second
Independent	Richard Taylor	City of Christchurch	Third
Liberal	Thomas Mackenzie	Clutha	Second
Liberal	Henry Fish	City of Dunedin	Third
Liberal	William Hutchison	City of Dunedin	Third
Liberal–Labour	David Pinkerton	City of Dunedin	First
Liberal	William Dawson	Dunedin Suburbs	First
Liberal	William Kelly	East Coast	Third
Conservative	Edwin Mitchelson	Eden	Fourth
Conservative	Harry Atkinson	Egmont	Ninth
Conservative	John Hall	Ellesmere	Seventh
Conservative	Ebenezer Hamlin	Franklin	Sixth
Conservative	Arthur Rhodes	Geraldine	Second
Liberal	Arthur Guinness	Grey	Third
Conservative	William Rolleston	Halswell	Seventh
Conservative	William Russell	Hawke's Bay	Fifth
Liberal–Labour	William Tanner	Heathcote	First
Conservative	Alfred Newman	Hutt	Third
Liberal	Richard Reeves	Inangahua	Third
Liberal–Labour	James Kelly	Invercargill	First
Conservative	Richard Moore	Kaiapoi	First
Conservative	Frank Buckland	Manukau	Second
Conservative	Robert Thompson	Marsden	Second
Liberal	Alexander Hogg	Masterton	First
Conservative	George Richardson	Mataura	Third
Conservative	Scobie Mackenzie	Mount Ida	Third
Conservative	George Swan	Napier	First
Conservative	Joseph Harkness	City of Nelson	Second
Liberal	Edward Smith	New Plymouth	First
Liberal	David Goldie	Newton	Third
Liberal	Thomas Duncan	Oamaru	Fourth
Conservative	James Wilson	Palmerston	Fourth
Conservative	Frank Lawry (Note: Lawry stood in support of the Atkinson Ministry but changed allegiance to the Liberals in 1891)	Parnell	Second
Liberal–Labour	William Earnshaw	Peninsula	First
Independent	James Mills	Port Chalmers	Third
Conservative	Douglas Macarthur	Rangitikei	Third
Independent	Alfred Saunders	Selwyn	Fifth
Liberal	Walter Carncross	Taieri	First
Independent	William Allen	Te Aroha	First
Liberal	Alfred Cadman	Thames	Fourth
Independent Liberal	William Hall-Jones	Timaru	Second
Conservative	Hugh Valentine	Tuapeka	Second
Conservative	John Bryce	Waikato	Eighth
Liberal	William Steward	Waimate	Fifth
Liberal	Charles H Mills	Waimea-Picton	First
Liberal	William Smith	Waipawa	Fourth
Conservative	Walter Buchanan	Wairarapa	Fourth
Liberal–Labour	Lindsay Buick	Wairau	First
Liberal	John McKenzie	Waitaki	Fourth
Independent Liberal	Jackson Palmer	Waitemata	First
Conservative	George Hutchinson	Waitotara	Second
Conservative	Thomas Fergus	Wakatipu	Fourth
Liberal	James Mackintosh	Wallace	First
Liberal	John Ballance	Wanganui	Sixth
Conservative	John Duthie	City of Wellington	First
Liberal	George Fisher	City of Wellington	Third
Liberal	Kennedy Macdonald	City of Wellington	First
Liberal	Richard Seddon	Westland	Fifth
Independent	James Carroll	Eastern Maori	Second
Independent	Sydney Taiwhanga	Northern Maori	Second
Liberal	Tame Parata	Southern Maori	Third
Independent	Hoani Taipua	Western Maori	Third

Table footnotes:

== Changes during 11th Parliament ==
There were a number of changes during the term of the 11th Parliament.

Electorate and by-election		Date	Incumbent	Cause	Winner
Northern Maori	1891	7 February	Sydney Taiwhanga	Death	Eparaima Te Mutu Kapa
Egmont	1891	17 February	Harry Atkinson	Appointed to Legislative Council	Felix McGuire
Newton	1891	31 March	David Goldie	Resignation	Sir George Grey
Te Aroha	1891	9 July	William Allen	Disallowed on petition	William Fraser
Waikato	1891	6 October	John Bryce	Resignation	Edward Lake
City of Christchurch	1891	9 October	Westby Perceval	Appointed Agent General	Ebenezer Sandford
City of Wellington	1892	15 January	Kennedy Macdonald	Resignation	William McLean
Bruce	1892	4 May	James Thomson	Resignation	James Allen
Rangitikei	1892	8 July	Douglas Macarthur	Death	Robert Bruce
Inangahua	1893	8 June	Richard Reeves	Bankruptcy	Sir Robert Stout
Wanganui	1893	9 June	John Ballance	Death	Archibald Willis
Thames	1893	26 July	Alfred Cadman	Resignation	James McGowan
City of Auckland	1893	4 August	William Rees	Resignation	Alfred Cadman

Person	Year	Seat	From	To
Frank Lawry	1891	Parnell	Conservative	Liberal
