= Walter Buller =

New Zealand lawyer and naturalist (1838–1906)

Sir Walter Buller KCMG
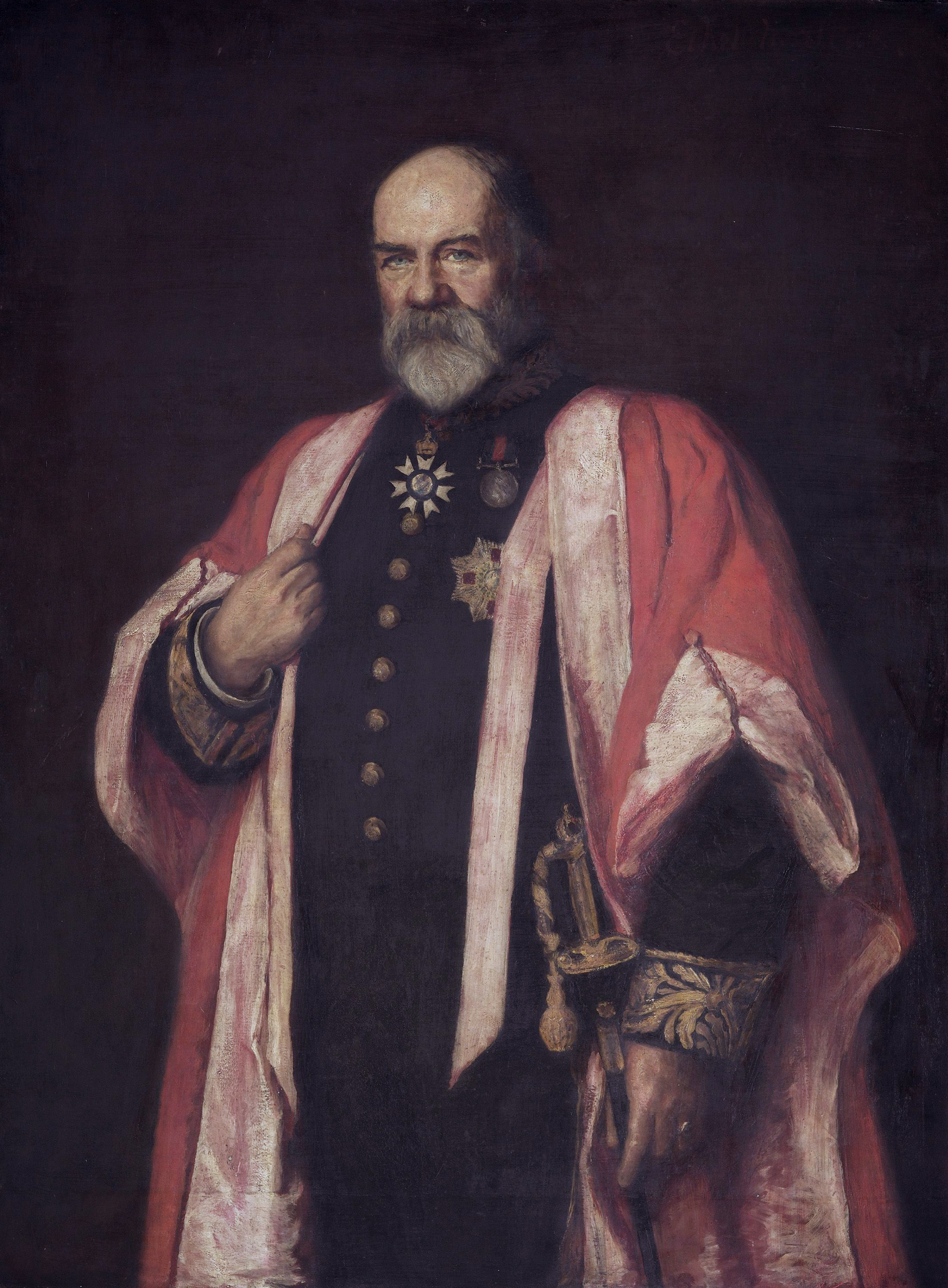
- Portrait of Buller, c. 1903
- Born: Walter Lawry Buller; 9 October 1838; Pākanae, Hokianga, New Zealand
- Died: 19 July 1906 (aged 67); Fleet, Hampshire, England
- Education: Wesley College, Auckland
- Known for: New Zealand ornithology, A History of the Birds of New Zealand
- Spouse: Charlotte Mair
- Children: Four
- Scientific career
- Fields: Law, ornithology
- Author abbrev. (zoology): Buller

Sir Walter Lawry Buller KCMG (9 October 1838 – 19 July 1906) was a New Zealand lawyer and naturalist who was a dominant figure in New Zealand ornithology. His book, A History of the Birds of New Zealand, first published in 1873, was published as an enlarged version in 1888 and became a New Zealand classic.

== Biography ==
Buller was born at Newark, the Wesleyan mission at Pākanae in the Hokianga, the son of Rev. James Buller, a Cornish missionary who had helped convert the people of Tonga to Methodism. He was educated at Wesley College in Auckland. In 1854, he moved to Wellington with his parents, where he was befriended by the naturalist William Swainson. In 1859 he was made Native Commissioner for the Southern Provinces. In 1871 he travelled to England and was called to the bar at the Inner Temple. Three years later he returned to Wellington and practised law.

In 1862, he married Charlotte Mair at Whangārei. They were to have four children.

Buller was the author of A History of the Birds of New Zealand (1872–1873, 2nd ed. 1887–1888), with illustrations by John Gerrard Keulemans and Henrik Grönvold. In 1882 he produced the Manual of the Birds of New Zealand as a cheaper popular alternative. In 1905, he published a two-volume Supplement to the History of the Birds of New Zealand, which brought the work up to date.

Buller was appointed Companion of the Most Distinguished Order of St Michael and St George in 1875. In November 1886, he was promoted to Knight Commander. Buller helped establish the scientific display in the New Zealand Court at the World's Fair in Paris and was decorated with the Officer of the Legion of Honour by the President of France in November 1889.

He made several unsuccessful attempts to enter Parliament as a Liberal. He contested the general elections of 1876 (Manawatu; beaten by the incumbent Walter Johnston) and 1881 (Foxton, where he came fourth of six candidates), and the 1891 by-election in the Te Aroha electorate (where he was beaten by William Fraser, the official Liberal Party candidate).

He emigrated to England in 1899 and died at Fleet, Hampshire, on 19 July 1906.

Wellington playwright Nick Blake authored a play on Buller's life, Dr Buller's Birds, which had its debut at the 2006 NZ International Arts Festival.

== List of honours ==
- KCMG
- Officier de la Légion d'Honneur (France)
- Officier de la Palmes académiques (France)

== Eponyms ==
Species named after Walter Buller include Thalassarche bulleri (Buller's albatross) and Puffinus bulleri (Buller's shearwater).

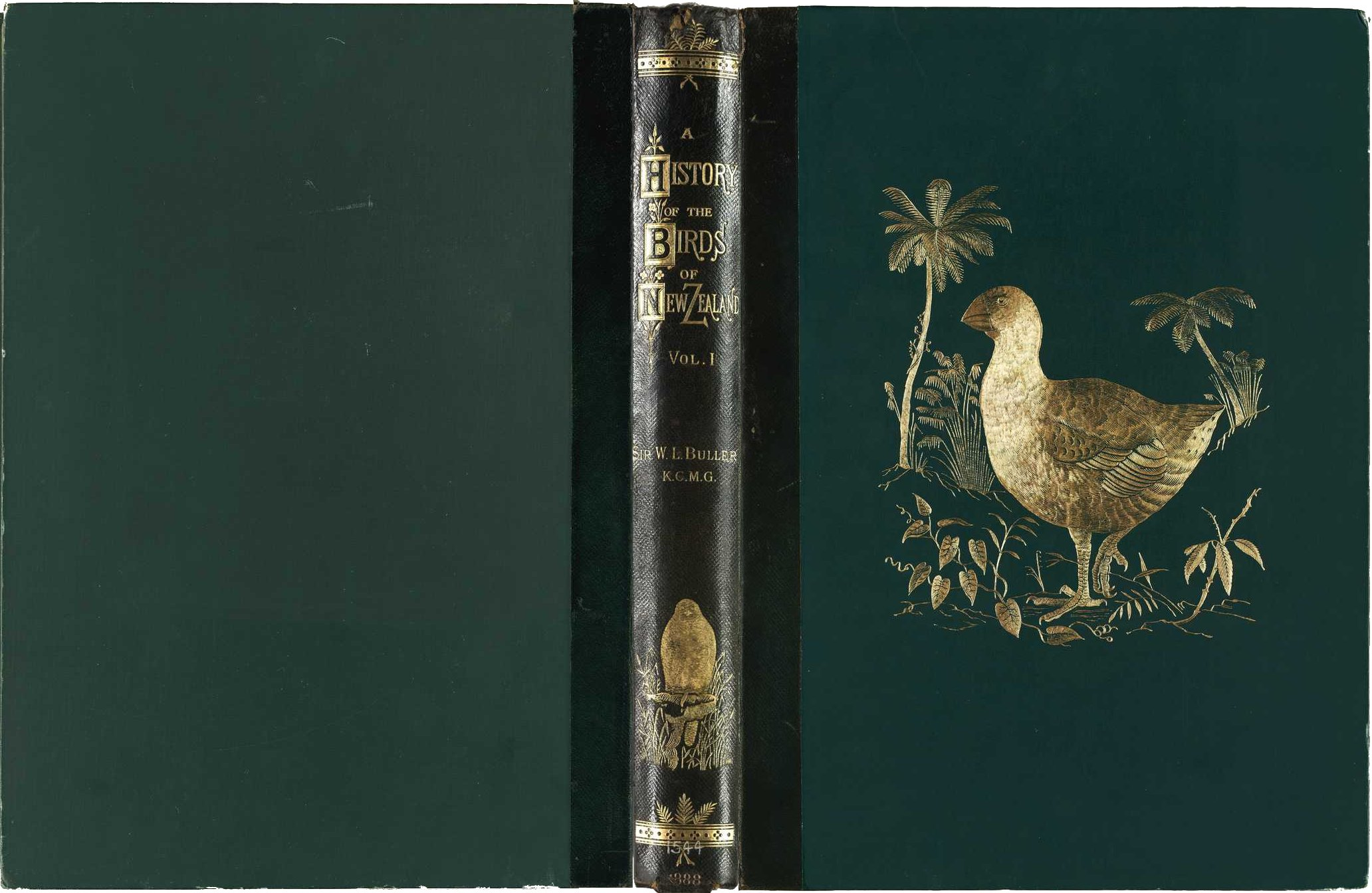
Book cover - A History of the Birds of New Zealand by Sir Walter Lawry Buller, Illustrated by J. G. Keulemans, 2nd edition, Published 1888.

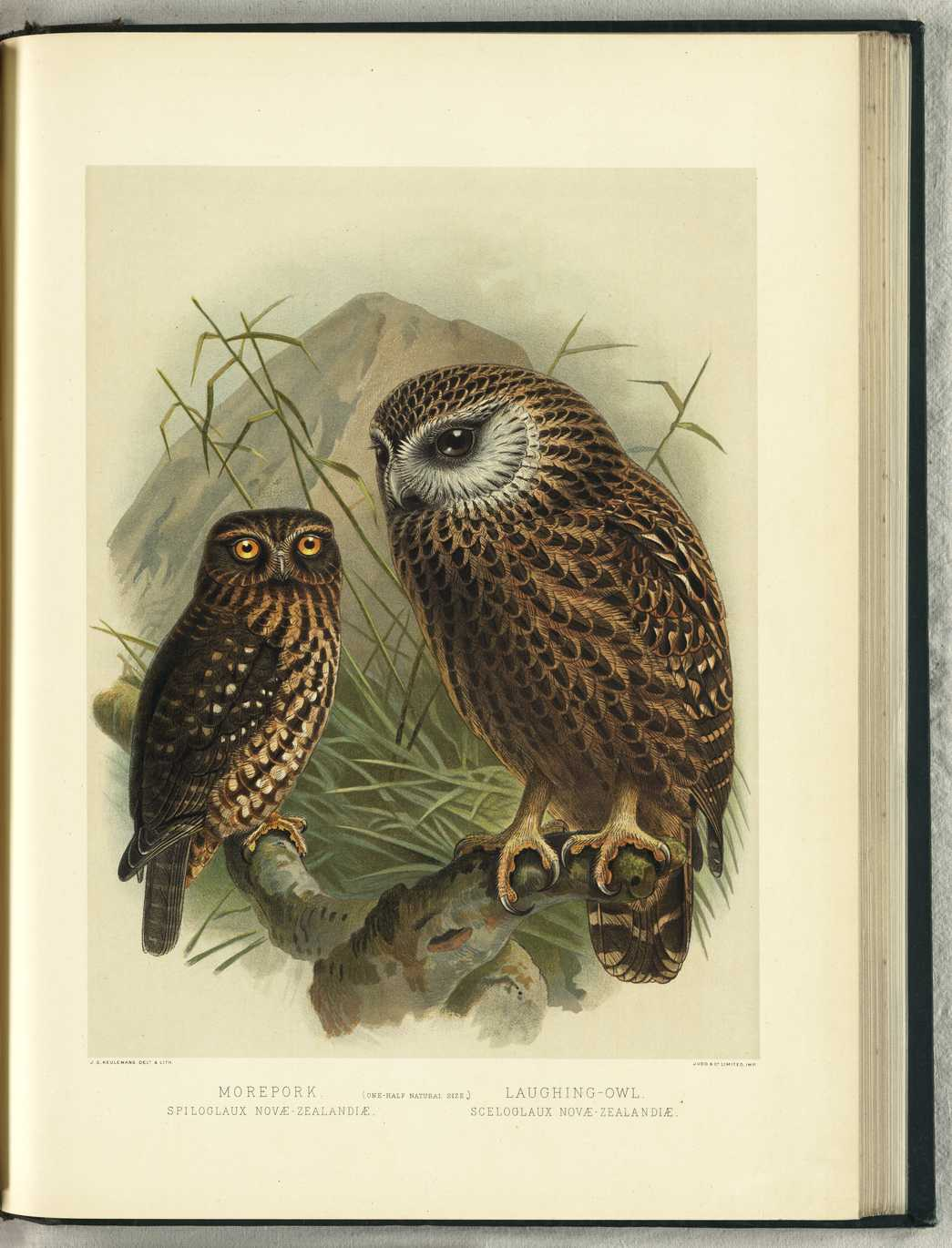
Illustrations of the morepork (left) and the extinct laughing owl (right) by John Gerrard Keulemans in Buller's A History of the Birds of New Zealand. 2nd edition. Published 1888.

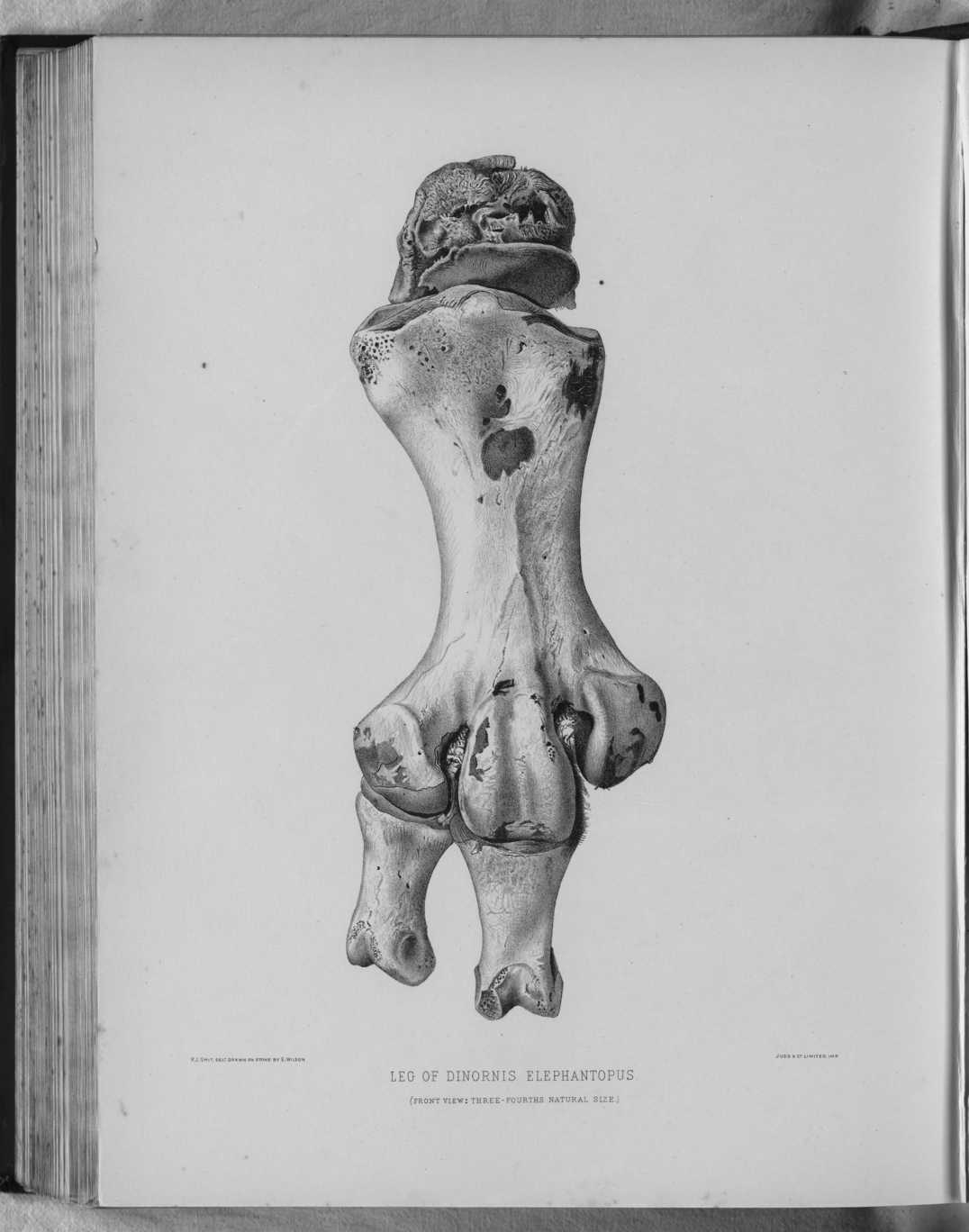
Pachyornis elephantopus ("Heavy-footed Moa")
original caption: Leg of Dinornis elephantopus (front view: three-fourths natural size)
