= Septimus James Edgar Closey =

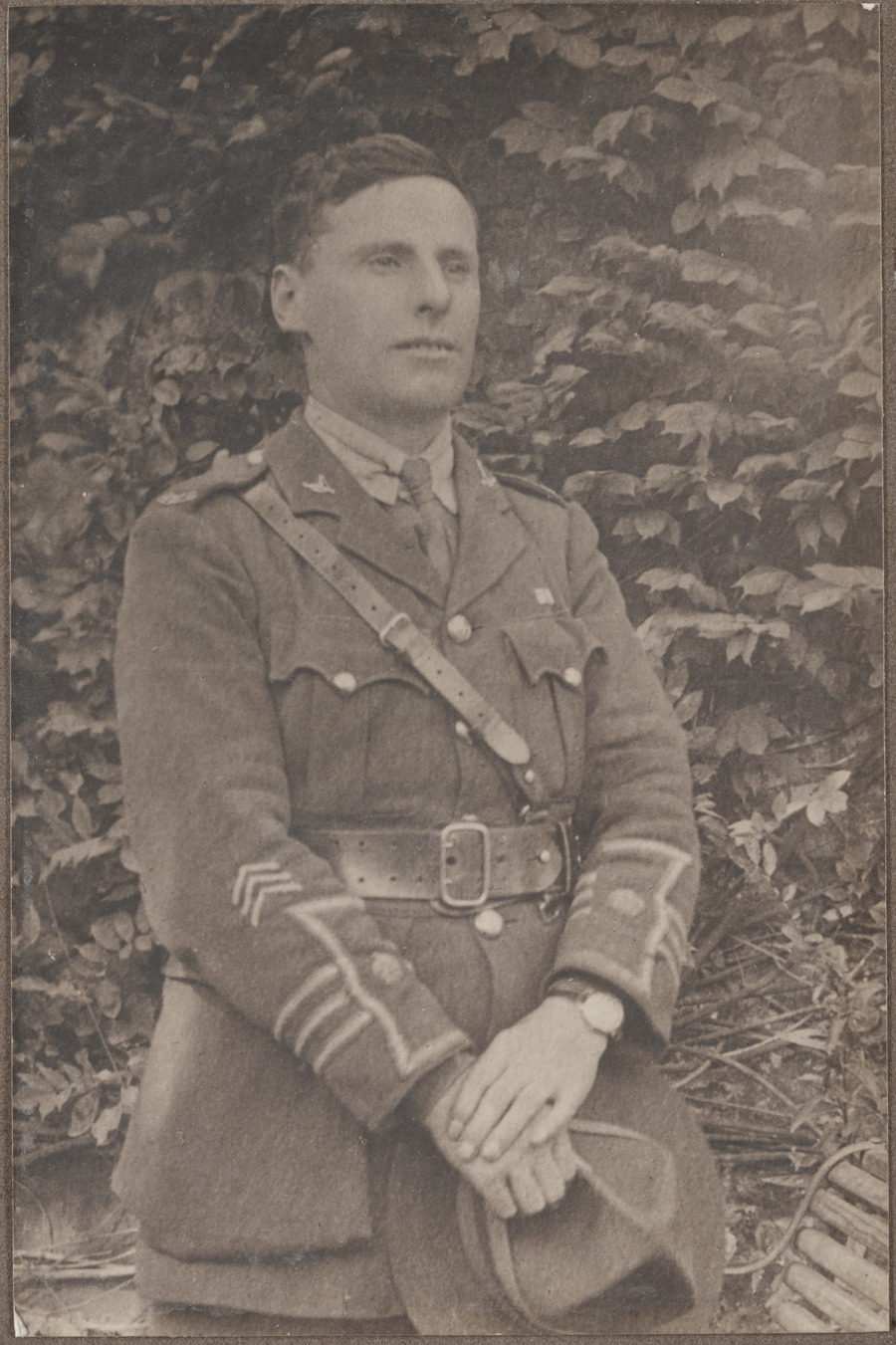
Captain S. J. E. Closey photograph (1920)

Septimus James Edgar Closey MC VD (13 October 1892 – 3 November 1981) was a New Zealand soldier, social crediter and politician.

== Biography ==
=== Early life and career ===
Closey was born in Lancashire in 1892. He and his family moved to New Zealand when he was 12 years old where they purchased a farm in the King Country. At the outbreak of World War I he enlisted in the New Zealand Expeditionary Force.

After the war he married Amy Finch and moved to Northland and worked as a builder then farmer. He was a member of the Ōtorohanga Borough Council where he was involved in improving rural education facilities. He was interested in army bands, rugby and racing. He served as president of the New Zealand Ayrshire Society.

=== Military career ===
He served overseas during World War I in the Waikato regiment of the New Zealand Rifle Brigade. He became the youngest soldier to ever rise to the rank of Colonel. He won the Military Cross and was also awarded the Volunteer Officers' Decoration.

Two of his brothers served in World War I; Frederick William and Robert Vincent Closey. He lectured extensively on the history of the New Zealand Rifle Brigade.

=== Political involvement ===
He became interested in monetary reform and joined the Country Party eventually becoming president of the party. In 1931 he was the campaign manager of Harold Rushworth in the Bay of Islands electorate.

Closey was the chairman of the Auckland branch of the Farmers' Union. By the 1932 he was recognised as the leader of the Social Credit Movement in New Zealand. Under his leadership the Farmers' Union passed resolutions on the need for public control of the country's financial system and increased payments to farm workers and the unemployed. He organised the visit of C. H. Douglas to New Zealand in 1934. Later that year he gave evidence in support of the social credit system at a Royal Commission of Inquiry.

He stood for the Manawatu electorate for the New Zealand House of Representatives in 1935 where he placed third out of five candidates with Labour's Lorrie Hunter winning. Following the election Closey tried to build a mutually beneficial relationship between the social credit movement and the Labour Party, writing to the finance minister Walter Nash. However Closey's intended outcome of a partnership did not eventuate and his goal of a credit authority being established as an independent wing of government was likewise unrealised. Nevertheless, he co-operated with many Labour MPs to establish affordable housing policies and a system of guaranteed prices for farmers. Closey stood in Manawatu again in the 1943 election as an independent. He placed third out of three candidates with National's Matthew Oram winning.

He supported the establishment of the Social Credit Party in 1953 and became the party's first president. He founded 160 branches of the party throughout the country. He was also a prolific pamphlet author for social credit ideas and frequently lectured on economics.

He was also a friend of radio personality Colin Scrimgeour.

=== Later life and death ===
He moved from Auckland to Christchurch in 1975. His wife died in March 1981. Closey died in Christchurch on 3 November 1981 aged 89. He was cremated at Canterbury Crematorium.
