= Ellen Ballance =

New Zealand suffragist and community worker (1846–1935)

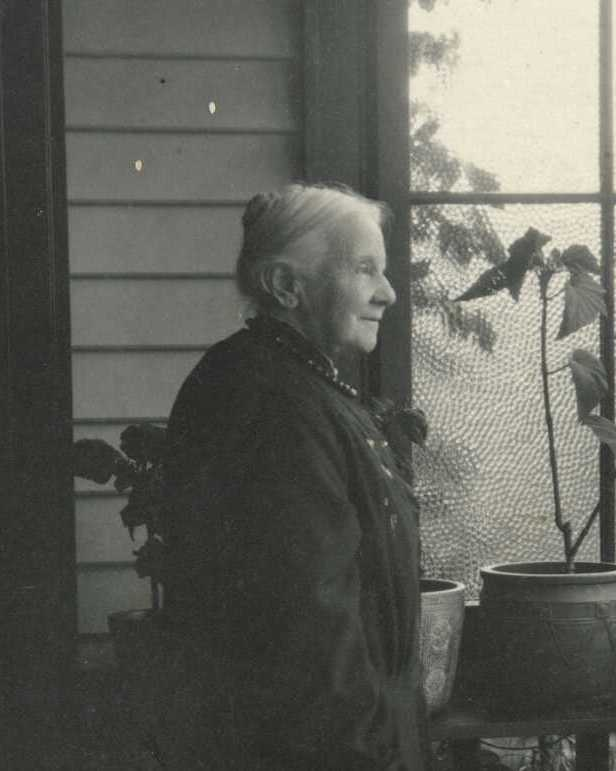
- Ballance, c. 1930

Spouse of the Prime Minister of New Zealand
- In role 24 January 1891 – 27 April 1893
- Preceded by: Ann Elizabeth Atkinson
- Succeeded by: Louisa Jane Seddon

Personal details
- Born: Ellen Anderson; 1846; Wellington, New Zealand
- Died: 14 June 1935 (aged 88–89); Wanganui, New Zealand
- Spouse: John Ballance (m. 1870; died 1893)
- Children: 1
- Occupation: Suffragist; community leader

Ellen Ballance (née Anderson; 1846 – 14 June 1935) was a New Zealand suffragist and community leader. She was a vice-president of the Women's Progressive Society, an international suffrage organisation based in London, and the inaugural president of the Wanganui Women's Franchise League in 1893.

== Early life and family ==
Ballance was born in Wellington and was the daughter of merchant David Anderson and his wife Ann Thompson. She had five brothers and three sisters.

On 19 May 1870, she married John Ballance, then a newspaper editor. She was his second wife. In 1886 they adopted her four-year-old niece, Florence, and re-christened her Kathleen.

== Political involvement and activism ==
Ballance was a prominent figure in the suffrage movement in New Zealand, and a vice-president of the Women's Progressive Society, an international suffrage organisation based in London. She shared her husband's political interests and became highly regarded in political circles in Wellington.

After the 1890 New Zealand general election, Ballance's husband became the 14th Premier of New Zealand. He was a supporter of women's suffrage; his successor later said that it had been Ballance who converted her husband to the cause. With his election and the new government, suffragist Kate Sheppard and women's groups renewed efforts to get the vote for women. In 1891, Ballance wrote to Sheppard to say that she would do everything in her power to "further the cause".

Ballance regularly attended Parliament to listen to debates. On one occasion in 1891 she caused a stir in the House when, after an anti-suffrage MP declared that women did not want the vote, she handed around a petition in the Ladies' Gallery. 68 women signed the petition to assure the House that they did in fact want the vote. She also collected signatures for the 1891 women's suffrage petition.

In April 1893 Ballance's husband died suddenly and she moved to live in his former constituency of Wanganui, where she was the inaugural president of the Wanganui Women's Franchise League, founded in June 1893. The League had close links to the National Council of Women of New Zealand and provided a forum for the discussion of issues of concern to women in Wanganui. The League's initial priorities under Ballance's leadership were collecting signatures for the women's suffrage petition (which went from 200 signatures locally to 2,600 signatures within a month of the League's foundation), and engaging with Parliament and local politicians. Later that year, the Electoral Act 1893 gave New Zealand women the right to vote. Ballance also donated her husband's library to the League.

Ballance lived in Wanganui for the rest of her life, and remained active in community organisations, including the Anglican church, the Wanganui Orphanage and the Plunket Society.
