= Jack Stevens (New Zealand politician) =

New Zealand politician

Jack Stevens MP
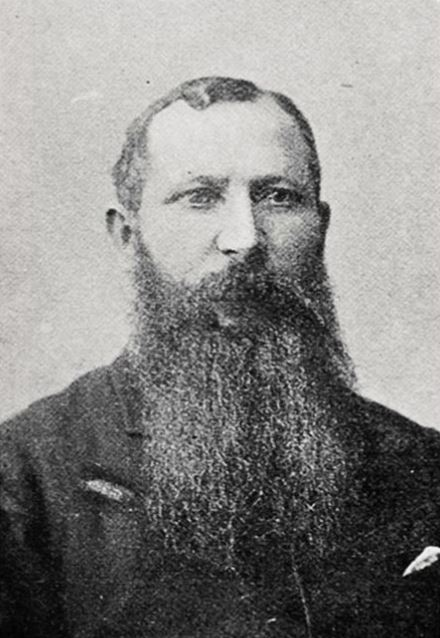

Member of the New Zealand Parliament for Manawatu
- In office 6 December 1905 – 17 November 1908
- Preceded by: Job Vile
- Succeeded by: Edward Newman
- In office 4 December 1896 – 25 November 1902
- Preceded by: In abeyance
- Succeeded by: Job Vile

Member of the New Zealand Parliament for Rangitikei
- In office 28 November 1893 – 4 December 1896
- Preceded by: Robert Bruce
- Succeeded by: Frank Lethbridge
- In office 9 December 1881 – 22 July 1884
- Preceded by: William Fox
- Succeeded by: Robert Bruce

Personal details
- Born: 1845 Wellington, New Zealand
- Died: 31 July 1916 (aged 70–71) Bulls, New Zealand
- Party: Liberal

John Stevens (1845 – 31 July 1916), known as Jack, was a Liberal Party Member of Parliament in New Zealand.

== Biography ==
=== Early life ===
Stevens was born in Wellington in 1845. Stevens moved north and resided in first the Rangitikei then Manawatu districts from 1854. He made a living in agricultural until 1873, when he was hired by Henry Russell as an assistant and interpreter during a Native Lands Alienation Commission at Napier. He pursued an occupation as a Maori interpreter and land agent, then began an auctioneering and land agency in 1875.

=== Member of Parliament ===
New Zealand Parliament
Years	Term	Electorate	Party
1881–1884	8th	Rangitikei	Independent
1893–1896	12th	Rangitikei	Liberal
1896–1899	13th	Manawatu	Liberal
1899–1902	14th	Manawatu	Liberal
1905–1908	16th	Manawatu	Liberal

Stevens represented the Rangitikei electorate from 1881 to 1884 when he was defeated, and then from 1893 to 1896. He unsuccessfully contested the Palmerston electorate in the 1890 election.

Stevens contested the 1892 Rangitikei by-election as an Independent Liberal as the Liberal Party was reluctant to endorse him in light of the recent Bruce by-election in which the candidate the Liberal Party endorsed lost by a large margin. Stevens lost by only 61 votes.

He later returned to parliament, representing the Manawatu electorate from 1896 to 1902 when he was defeated, and from 1905 to 1908 when he was again defeated. Stevens served as the Liberal Party's Senior Whip from 1900 until 1902. He was not a frequent speaker during debates in the house, but was very popular member in the lobbies, and was reputed as someone who knew the "political game" as well as any other. In July 1901 he was one of several Liberal MPs (alongside David Buddo, Henry Augustus Field, Richard Meredith and Frederick Pirani) that held a meeting to receive a deputation of the Farmers' Union. Some Liberals (such as Alexander Hogg) were opposed to meeting them and attempted to persuade them not to do so, but there was general support in the party for a pressure group to tend to the interests of farmers.

=== Later life ===
In his later years, he had become blind and his lower limbs were paralysed, but he was in good spirits and would not allow others to sympathise with him. He was in the midst of a conversation with friends when he leaned back and died on 31 July 1916.

== Citations ==
New Zealand Parliament
Preceded by William Fox	Member of Parliament for Rangitikei; 1881–1884 1893–1896	Succeeded by Robert Bruce
Preceded by Robert Bruce	Member of Parliament for Rangitikei; 1881–1884 1893–1896	Succeeded by Frank Lethbridge
In abeyance Title last held by Douglas Hastings Macarthur	Member of Parliament for Manawatu; 1896–1902 1905–1908	Succeeded by Job Vile
Preceded by Job Vile	Member of Parliament for Manawatu; 1896–1902 1905–1908	Succeeded by Edward Newman
Party political offices
Preceded by Charlie Mills	Senior Whip of the Liberal Party; 1900–1902	Succeeded by Walter Carncross
