= 1889 New Zealand Liberal Party leadership election =

- 6 July 1889
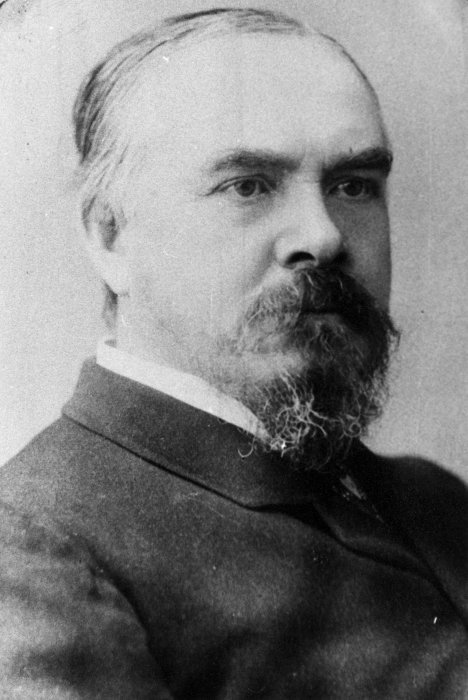

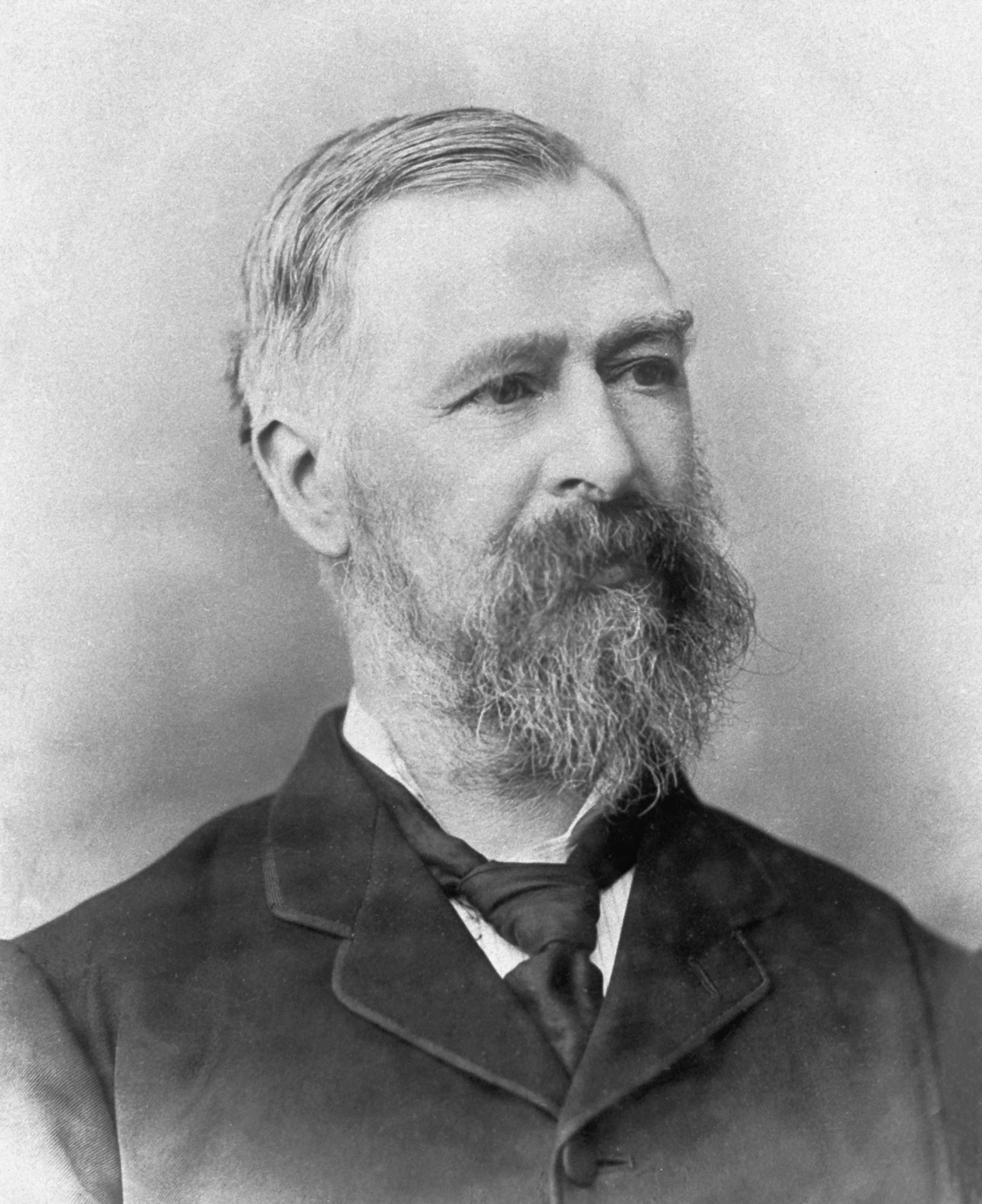
Candidate	John Ballance	William Walker
Leader's seat	Wanganui	Ashburton
Popular vote	23	11
Percentage	67.6	32.4
Leader before election
none
Leader after election
John Ballance

The 1889 New Zealand Liberal leadership election was held on 6 July to choose who would lead New Zealand's parliamentary opposition and, ultimately, decide the inaugural leader of the New Zealand Liberal Party. The election was won by Wanganui MP John Ballance.

== Background ==
After the Stout–Vogel Ministry had been defeated in the polls at the 1887 election parliament's liberal wing was in disarray. The MPs had lost their leader Sir Robert Stout, and were overwhelmingly tasked with defeating the sitting ministry headed by Harry Atkinson at the next general election. Sir Julius Vogel became the leader of the opposition with Stout out of Parliament, however he too in 1888 decided he would retire. Parliament continued and the opposition politicians were in limbo with little real leadership. To address these concerns a caucus was organised to select a new leader from amongst them to rival Atkinson and win back power in 1890. With Vogel's imminent departure the opposition decided not to elect a new leader. Instead it opted for collective leadership and elected a committee to co-ordinate its parliamentary activities. It consisted of James Dupré Lance, John Ballance, John McKenzie, Oliver Samuel, Richard Seddon, William Steward and Frederick Moss as well as the two opposition whips; William Campbell Walker and Frederick Fitchett. Lance was elected chairman of the leadership committee.

== Candidates ==
=== John Ballance ===
Ballance had been a leading figure in parliament's liberal faction for years and was a prominent critic of Atkinson. He had been a minister in the two previous liberal ministries of Sir George Grey and Sir Robert Stout. After Stout lost his seat in 1887, Ballance had been urging him to return and once again lead the liberal cause in parliament. Stout declined, and after his retirement from politics was known to Ballance, he took the initiative to stake his own claim to the leadership.

=== William Campbell Walker ===
Walker had been in Parliament from 1884 representing the Ashburton electorate. Since 1887 he had been the opposition Whip and a member of the leadership committee since 1888. Like Ballance, he had progressive views and was a personal friend of both him and Stout. Prior to entering parliament he had involved in provincial politics as a member of the Canterbury Provincial Council.

== Result ==
The election was conducted through a members' ballot by the opposition caucus upon which Ballance was successful. Walker made known his support for Ballance and a second vote entailed at his request, the vote unanimous. Lance vacated his role as chairman of the leadership committee in favour of Ballance.

Name	Votes	Percentage
John Ballance	23	67.6%
William Campbell Walker	11	32.4%

== Aftermath ==
John Ballance led the Liberals until his death in 1893 including two years as prime minister, forming his own ministry in 1891 after winning the 1890 election. He took on the leadership by stating to caucus that he accepted 'not without much hesitation' and feeling it was his duty. The Premier, Harry Atkinson, congratulated Ballance on winning the leadership at Parliament's next sitting.
