= Halswell (electorate) =

Halswell was a parliamentary electorate in Christchurch, New Zealand, from 1890 to 1893. It was represented by one Member of Parliament during that time.

== Population centres ==
In December 1887, the House of Representatives voted to reduce its membership from general electorates from 91 to 70. The 1890 electoral redistribution used the same 1886 census data used for the 1887 electoral redistribution. In addition, three-member electorates were introduced in the four main centres. This resulted in a major restructuring of electorates, and Halswell was one of four electorates to be first created for the 1890 election.

The area of the Halswell electorate was classed as fully rural (i.e. no boroughs within its area had a population of more than 2,000 people), and the maximum country quota of 28% thus applied. The electorate was named after Halswell near Christchurch. In the 1890 election, polling booths were in Halswell, Tai Tapu, Templeton, Addington, Prebbleton and Fendalton. Other settlements that fell within the electorate's boundaries were Yaldhurst, Islington, Oaklands, Ladbrooks, and Lincoln.

== History ==
The Halswell electorate was formed for the 1890 election, which determined the composition of the 11th Parliament.

The electorate was represented by one Member of Parliament, William Rolleston. The 1890 election was contested by Rolleston and Francis Samuel Parker. Rolleston and Parker received 748 and 548 votes, respectively.

Rolleston remained a member during the term of the term of the 11th Parliament. The Halswell electorate was abolished in 1893, and Rolleston unsuccessfully contested the Ellesmere electorate in the 1893 election.

=== Members of Parliament ===
Key

Conservative

Election	Winner
1890 election	William Rolleston
(Electorate abolished in 1893; see Riccarton)

== Election results ==
=== 1890 election ===
1890 general election: Halswell
Party	Candidate	Votes	%	±%
Conservative	William Rolleston	748	57.71	
Liberal–Labour	Francis Samuel Parker	548	42.29	
Majority		200	15.43	
Turnout		1,296	49.40	
Registered electors		2,623		
