= John Ballance =

Premier of New Zealand from 1891 to 1893

The Right Honourable John Ballance
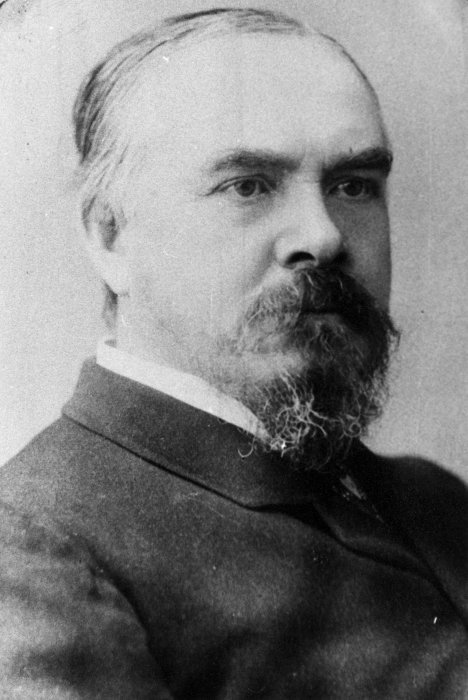
- Ballance c. 1880

14th Premier of New Zealand
- In office 24 January 1891 – 27 April 1893†
- Monarch: Victoria
- Governor: William Onslow; David Boyle
- Preceded by: Harry Atkinson
- Succeeded by: Richard Seddon

1st Leader of the Opposition
- In office 2 July 1889 – 23 January 1891
- Deputy: Richard Seddon
- Succeeded by: John Bryce

17th Minister of Lands
- In office 3 September 1884 – 8 October 1887
- Prime Minister: Robert Stout
- Preceded by: Richmond Hursthouse
- Succeeded by: George Richardson

5th Minister of Defence
- In office 16 July 1884 – 8 October 1887
- Prime Minister: Robert Stout
- Preceded by: John Bryce
- Succeeded by: Thomas Fergus

1st Minister of Education
- In office 12 January 1878 – 1 July 1879
- Prime Minister: George Grey
- Succeeded by: William Rolleston

Member of the New Zealand Parliament for Wanganui
- In office 22 July 1884 – 27 April 1893
- Preceded by: William Hogg Watt
- Succeeded by: Archibald Willis
- In office 5 September 1879 – 9 December 1881
- Preceded by: William Fox
- Succeeded by: William Hogg Watt

Member of the New Zealand Parliament for Rangitikei
- In office 24 April 1875 – 5 September 1879
- Preceded by: William Fox
- Succeeded by: William Willis

Personal details
- Born: 27 March 1839 Glenavy, Ulster, Ireland
- Died: 27 April 1893 (aged 54) Wellington, New Zealand
- Party: Liberal
- Spouse(s): Fanny Taylor (m. 1863, d. 1868); Ellen Anderson (m. 1870)
- Children: 1 (adopted)
- Parent(s): Samuel Ballance; Mary McNiece
- Awards: New Zealand Medal
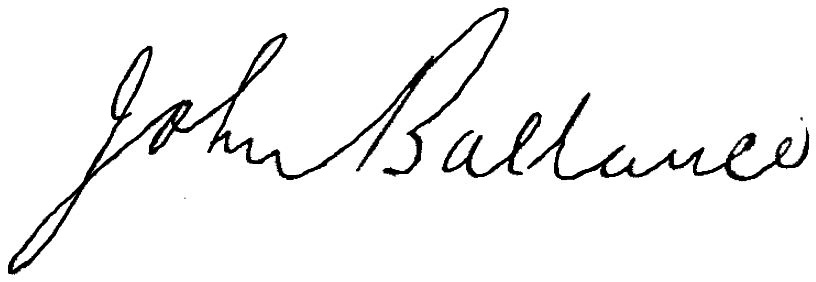
- Signature

Military service
- Allegiance: New Zealand Army
- Years of service: 1868–69
- Rank: Cornet
- Battles/wars: New Zealand Wars

John Ballance (27 March 1839 – 27 April 1893) was a New Zealand politician who served as the 14th premier of New Zealand from January 1891 until his death in April 1893. He governed as the leader of New Zealand's first organised political party, the New Zealand Liberal Party, which was formed shortly after the 1890 election.

Born in Ireland, Ballance emigrated to New Zealand in 1866, where he initially worked as a journalist before entering politics. He represented Whanganui in Parliament, and was known for his progressive and reformist views. Elected leader of the Opposition in 1889, Ballance led liberal factions to victory in the 1890 election. His Liberal Government implemented progressive policies, including land reform, and introduced a land tax influenced by Georgist principles. It also laid the groundwork for women's suffrage, achieved shortly after his death.

Ballance emphasised egalitarianism and sought to balance the interests of urban workers and rural farmers. Despite his relatively short tenure, his reforms profoundly influenced the country's political landscape. Ballance died in office in 1893. He was succeeded as head of government by Richard Seddon.

== Early life ==
The eldest son of Samuel Ballance, a tenant farmer, and Mary McNiece, Ballance was born on 27 March 1839 in Glenavy in County Antrim Ireland (modern-day Northern Ireland). He was educated at a national school, then apprenticed to an ironmonger in Belfast. He later became a clerk in a wholesale ironmonger's house in Birmingham, where he married. Ballance was highly interested in literature, and was known for spending vast amounts of time reading books. He also became interested in politics, mostly due to the influence of his parents – his father was active in conservative circles, while his mother was a liberal and a Quaker. It was from his mother that Ballance gained many of the ideas he was later to promote. Having witnessed religious rioting when in Belfast, he became committed to the principle of secularism.

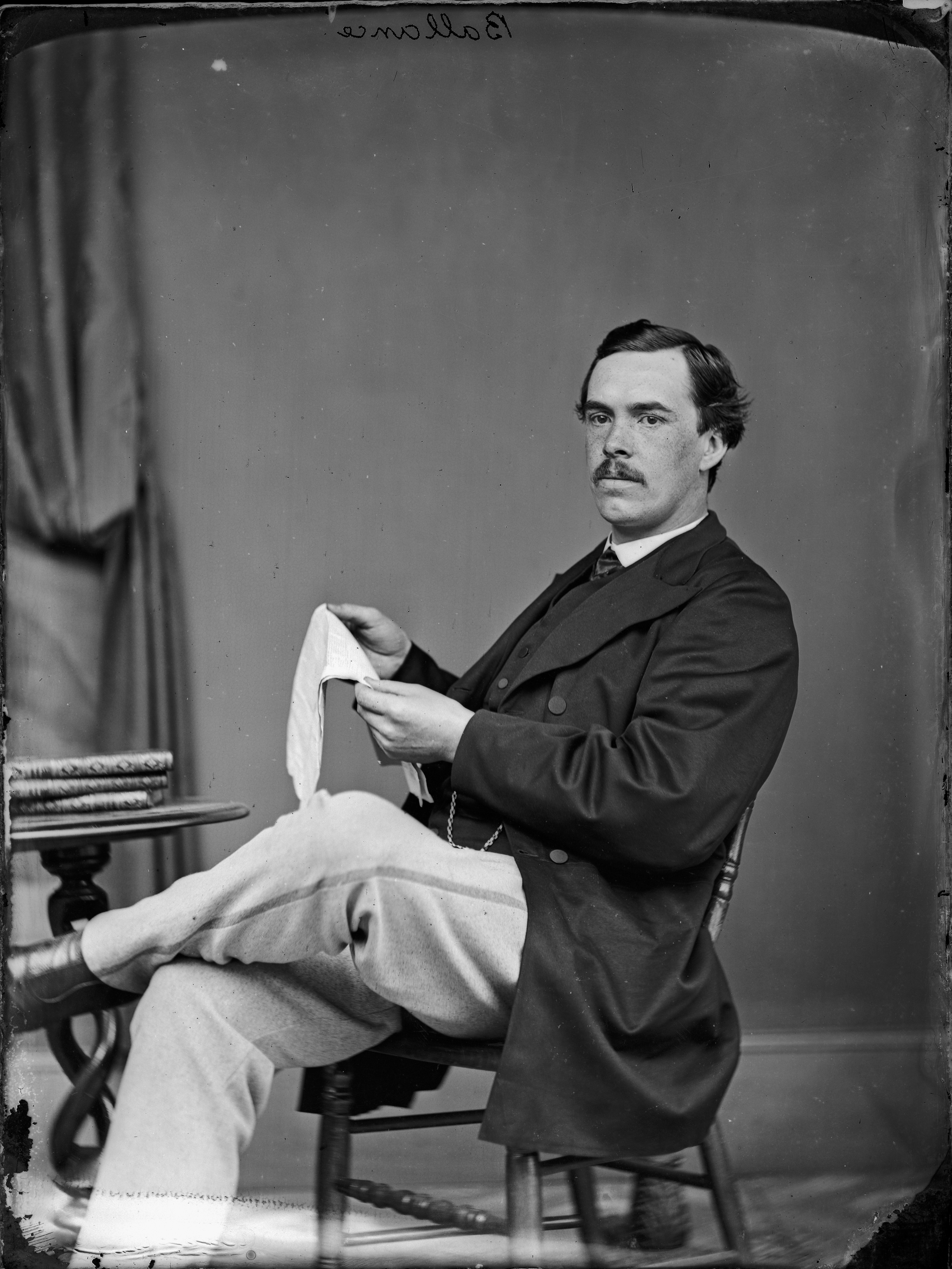
Ballance in around 1870

In 1866, Ballance and his wife migrated to New Zealand, intending to start in business as a small jeweller. After settling in Wanganui, however, he took an opportunity to found a newspaper, The Wanganui Herald. He became the editor, and remained chief owner for the rest of his life. During the fighting with the Māori chief Titokowaru in 1867, Ballance was involved in the raising of a volunteer cavalry troop, in which he received a commission. He was later deprived of this owing to the appearance in the Herald of articles criticising the management of the campaign. He behaved well in the field, and, in spite of his dismissal, was awarded the New Zealand Medal.

Following the conflict, Ballance's status in Wanganui grew. He was respected for his management of the Herald, particularly his forthright and direct approach to reporting. He became increasingly involved in the affairs of the town, establishing a number of societies and associations. Perhaps the least important to Wanganui but among the most important to him was the chess club – he became a skilled player. In 1868 his wife Fanny died of illness, aged only 24. Two years later, he married Ellen Anderson, the daughter of a Wellington merchant.

== Member of Parliament ==
New Zealand Parliament
Years	Term	Electorate	Party
1875–1876	5th	Rangitikei	Independent
1876–1879	6th	Rangitikei	Independent
1879–1881	7th	Wanganui	Independent
1884–1887	9th	Wanganui	Independent
1887–1890	10th	Wanganui	Independent
1890–1893	11th	Wanganui	Liberal

Ballance first contemplated moving into national politics in 1872, putting his name forward as a candidate for the seat of Egmont in a parliamentary by-election. However, Ballance withdrew from the ballot before the vote was held. In 1875, Ballance entered Parliament, having won Rangitikei in a by-election. He campaigned on two major issues – the abolition of the provinces (widely regarded as incompetent, petty, and obstructive) and the provision of free education. Ballance soon made his presence felt in Wellington. The abolition of the provinces occurred in 1876 under Julius Vogel—after which Ballance turned his attention to promoting closer land settlement, considering it the main political issue of the day.

=== Grey Ministry ===
In 1877, Ballance entered the cabinet of Sir George Grey, a former Governor who was then Premier. Grey's policies were not closely aligned with those of Ballance, but Ballance believed that he could nevertheless accomplish something worthwhile. He was Minister of Customs, Minister of Education, and later Colonial Treasurer. His appointment to head the treasury was a surprise to most, giving a high office to a relative newcomer on the political stage.

On 6 August 1878, Ballance delivered a financial statement, which was seen as the most significant since the public works announcement by Julius Vogel in 1870. Ballance set about reforming the tariff system by removing duties on basic necessities and introducing a modest though somewhat symbolic land tax, an idea he later revisited. His alliance with Grey ended with a notorious and very painful quarrel. Ballance found Grey far too controlling and authoritarian, resigning his portfolios yet still gave him confidence in the house.

From 1879 Ballance represented Wanganui, but in 1881 he lost by just four votes (393 to 397), and it was reported that seven of his supporters were too late to vote as their carriage broke down. He returned to Parliament for Wanganui in 1884.

=== Stout Ministry ===
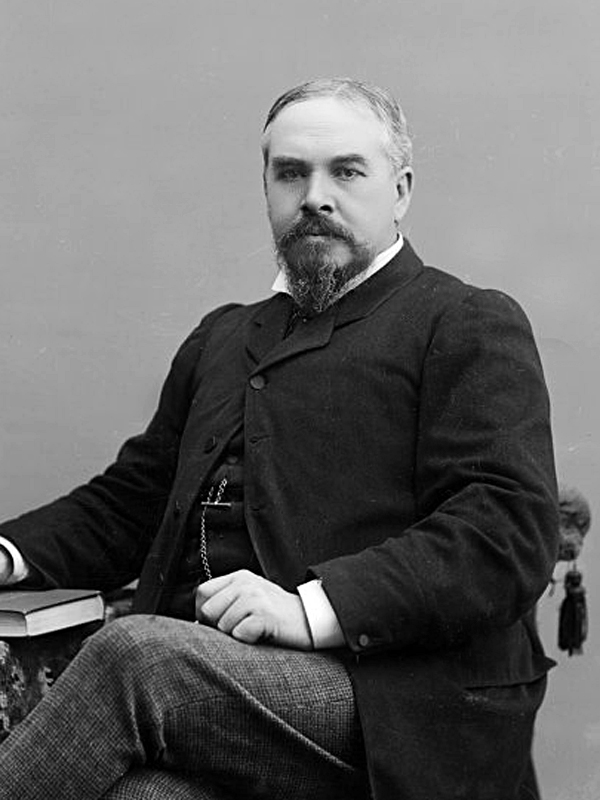
Ballance in around 1880

On re-election as an independent in 1884, Ballance became a minister in the Cabinet of Robert Stout, a fellow liberal. He was Minister of Lands and Immigration, Minister of Defence and Minister of Native Affairs (relations with Māori). In his role as Minister of Lands he encouraged intensive settlement of rural areas, aiming to increase the number of people leaving the cities to "work the land", which he believed was essential to increase productivity and self-sufficiency. His system of state-aided "village settlements" – small holdings were leased by the Crown to farmers and money lent them to make a beginning of building and cultivation – was generally successful.

Despite this desire for increased settlement of colonist-held land, he strongly supported the rights of Māori to retain the land they still held – many other politicians of his time believed that acquisition of Māori land was essential for increasing settlement. He reduced military presence in areas where strong tensions with Māori existed, and made an attempt to familiarise himself with Māori language and culture. In 1887 Stout's government lost the general election, but Ballance remained popular. Illness initially prevented his full participation in politics, but with his recovery in July 1889 he became Leader of the Opposition.

== Premier ==
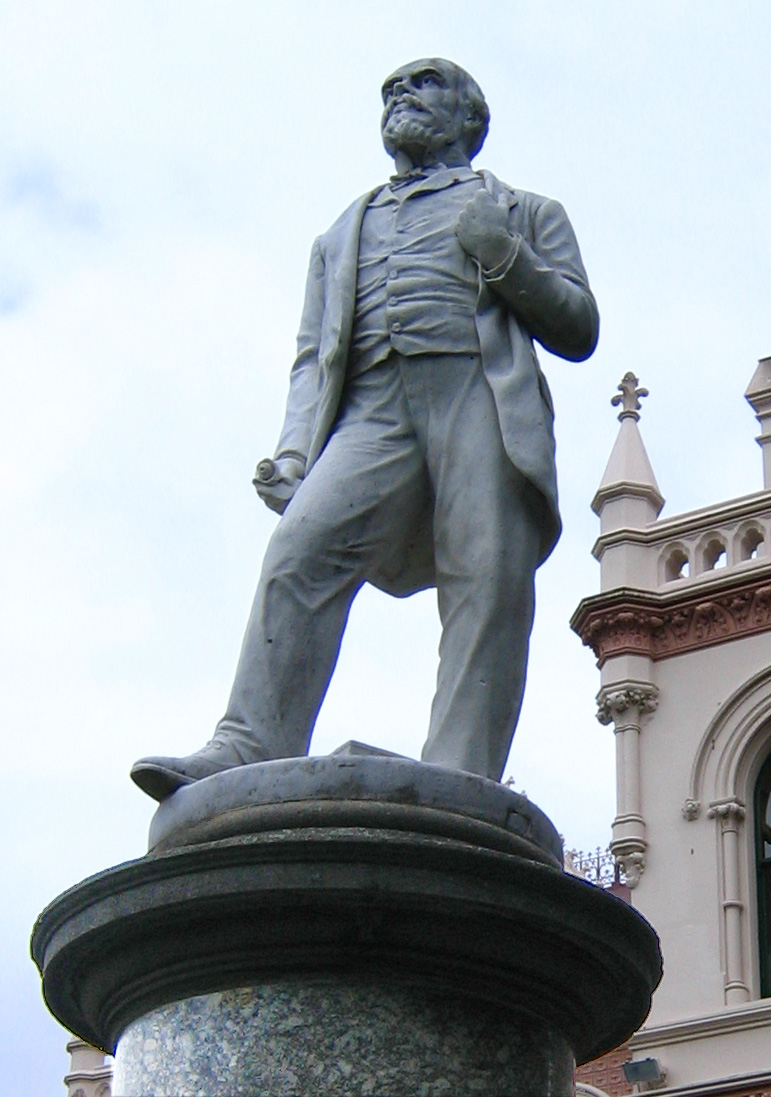
A statue of John Ballance outside the Parliamentary Library in Wellington

In 1890 Ballance led a loose coalition of liberal politicians to victory in the general election. The more liberal minded candidates at the election fared well as there was public discontent with the sitting administration. The background of the election was filled with strikes and an economic recession. Harry Atkinson, the Premier who had defeated Stout, was forced to resign, but not before stacking the Legislative Council with his supporters. This was a serious problem for Ballance's premiership but he was able to overcome it, partly by reducing the life-tenure of legislative councillors to one term of seven years. His successful battle with the Governor over changes to the Legislative Council helped define the relationship between the elected Premier and the appointed Governor, mostly in the Premier's favour.

As leader of Parliament's liberal faction, he brought his allies and colleagues into the Liberal Party, New Zealand's first political party, intended to embody the liberal ideas of Stout, Vogel, and Ballance himself. The next four premiers were from the party, although some (such as Richard Seddon) were more conservative than Ballance. Quiet and unassuming in manner and well read, Ballance always seemed fonder of his books and his chessboard than of public bustle. He has been described as "unassuming and unpretentious", and was quiet, polite, and extremely patient.

After hand-picking a cabinet of men of considerable talent, Ballance led the government through two difficult years of economic reform. He appointed himself as Treasurer, and in this capacity, in 1891, he implemented new land and progressive income taxes, similar to that of the taxes introduced under Grey, though more radical. Several other notable pieces of legislation were passed by Ballance in this period, such as the Land Act 1892 and the Land for Settlements Act 1892. Despite initial outcry, the tax was seen as equitable by the people, who eventually found themselves better off as a result of such a great decrease in direct taxations. He was widely praised for his handling of the economy, which expanded greatly during his term.

Ballance was actively involved in the advocacy of women's suffrage, declaring to Parliament that he believed in the "absolute equality of the sexes." This was a cause he had partially inherited from his colleague in the Stout government, Julius Vogel, and in which he was influenced by his politically astute wife.

== Death ==
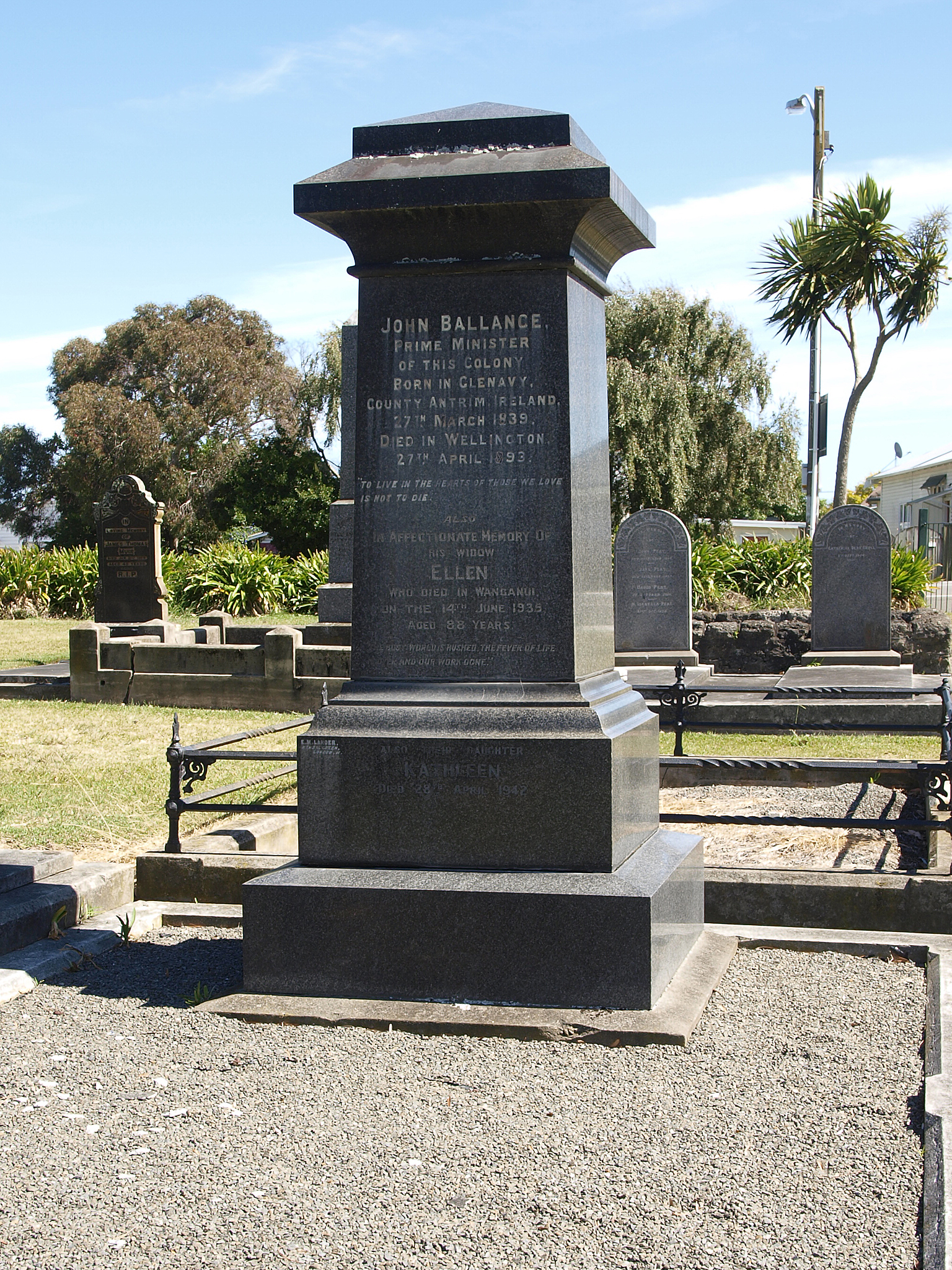
Ballance's gravestone in Whanganui

In 1893, at the height of his success and popularity, he died at Premier House in Wellington of cancer. He was succeeded by Richard Seddon despite supporting Stout as his preferred successor. He was the first New Zealand Prime Minister to die in office.

A state funeral was held for Ballance in Whanganui on 30 April 1893, and he was buried in Whanganui the same day.

A statue was erected to his memory in front of Parliament House, Wellington, in front of what is now the parliamentary library – Parliament has since moved to a bigger, adjacent building. Another statue was erected in Moutoa Gardens in Wanganui.

== Notes ==
Government offices
Preceded by Harry Atkinson	Premier of New Zealand; 1891–1893	Succeeded by Richard Seddon
First	Minister of Education; 1878–1879	Succeeded by William Rolleston
New Zealand Parliament
Preceded by William Fox	Member of Parliament for Rangitikei; 1876–1879	Succeeded by William Jarvis Willis
Preceded by William Fox	Member of Parliament for Wanganui; 1879–1881 (serving alongside John Bryce); 1884–1893	Succeeded by William Hogg Watt
Preceded by William Hogg Watt	Member of Parliament for Wanganui; 1879–1881 (serving alongside John Bryce); 1884–1893	Succeeded by Archibald Willis
Party political offices
First	Leader of the Liberal Party; 1889–1893	Succeeded by Richard Seddon
