= Te Aroha (electorate) =

Te Aroha was a parliamentary electorate centred around the town of Te Aroha. The electorate was represented by two Members of Parliament.

== Population centres ==
In December 1887, the House of Representatives voted to reduce its membership from general electorates from 91 to 70. The 1890 electoral redistribution used the same 1886 census data used for the 1887 electoral redistribution. In addition, three-member electorates were introduced in the four main centres. This resulted in a major restructuring of electorates, and Te Aroha was one of four electorates to be first created for the 1890 election.

The electorate was based on the town of Te Aroha. In the 1890 elections, there were 22 polling booths in the electorate covering a large part of the eastern Waikato and the Coromandel.

== History ==
The electorate was first formed for the 11th New Zealand Parliament in 1890. William Shepherd Allen and William Fraser contested the 1890 election. Votes for Allen and Fraser were 786 and 609 respectively; a majority of 177 votes for Allen, who was declared elected. After a petition by Fraser was accepted, the election was declared void on 3 April 1891.

The 9 July 1891 by-election was contested by Fraser, Sir Walter Buller, and Dr Broome (Allen was prevented from standing). It was won by Fraser with a large majority. He represented the electorate until the end of the term of the 11th Parliament in 1893, when the electorate was abolished.

=== Members of Parliament ===
The electorate was represented by two Members of Parliament:

Key

Independent Liberal

Election	Winner
1890 election	William Allen
1891 by-election	William Fraser

== Election results ==
=== 1891 by-election ===
1891 Te Aroha by-election
Party	Candidate	Votes	%	±%
Liberal	William Fraser	875	60.89	+17.24
Independent Liberal	Walter Buller	523	36.40	
Independent	Charles Broome	12	0.84	
Informal votes		27	1.88	
Majority		352	24.50	
Turnout		1,437	50.06	+1.46
Registered electors		2,870		

=== 1890 election ===
1890 general election: Te Aroha
Party	Candidate	Votes	%	±%
Independent	William Shepherd Allen	786	56.34	
Liberal	William Fraser	609	43.65	
Majority		175	12.54	
Turnout		1,395	48.60	
Registered electors		2,870		
