= Robert Bruce (New Zealand politician) =

New Zealand sailor, politician and conservationist (1843–1917)

New Zealand Parliament
Years	Term	Electorate	Party
1884–1887	9th	Rangitikei	Independent
1887–1890	10th	Rangitikei	Conservative
1892–1893	11th	Rangitikei	Conservative

Robert Cunningham Bruce (c. 1843 – 23 April 1917) was a Scottish-born sailor, New Zealand politician and conservationist.

Born in East Lothian, Scotland, Bruce's family moved to County Cork, Ireland, when he was seven years of age. He became an apprentice sailor at 13, leaving London on an East Indiaman. He eventually arrived in New Zealand on the Blue Jacket in 1860.

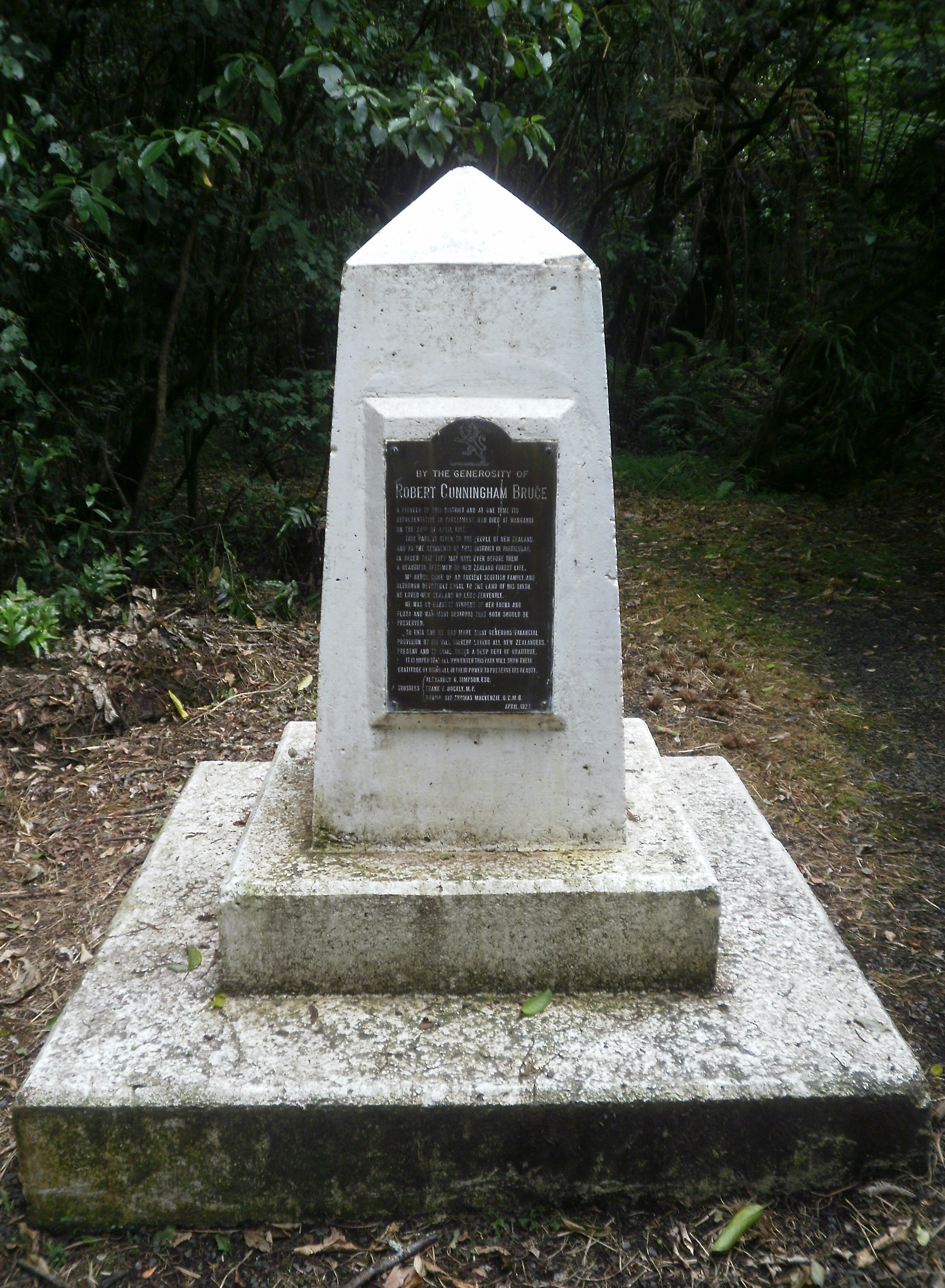
Bruce Park Memorial in Bruce Park Scenic Reserve

After working in the goldfields of New Zealand and Queensland, he went to the United States where he remained for several years. In 1877 he returned to New Zealand, buying land in Paraekaretu in the Manawatū region.

Bruce was an independent conservative Member of Parliament in the Manawatū region of New Zealand. He represented the Rangitikei electorate from 1884 to 1890. He contested the 1890 election in the Waitotara electorate, but was beaten by the incumbent, George Hutchison. He stood in the 1891 Egmont by-election but was beaten by Felix McGuire.

The Rangitiki electorate, meanwhile, had been won by Douglas Hastings Macarthur in 1890, but Macarthur died on 24 May 1892. The resulting 1892 by-election was won by Bruce. He served until the end of the parliamentary term in 1893 when he retired. He was one of three candidates to contest the new Manawatu electorate in the 1896 election, but he was narrowly beaten by Jack Stevens. He challenged Stevens again in the 1899 election but was again defeated.

Bruce was a notable pioneer of the Manawatū District, who preserved several native forest remnants, including Bruce Park Scenic Reserve. Bruce Road at Mount Ruapehu is named after him. Late in his life, Bruce wrote a book about his experiences at sea. He died at his homestead Carrick in the Wanganui suburb of St. Johns Hill on 23 April 1917.

== Bibliography ==
- Bruce, Robert Cunningham (1914). Reminiscences of a Wanderer. Whitcombe & Tombs.

== Notes ==
New Zealand Parliament
Preceded by Jack Stevens	Member of Parliament for Rangitikei; 1884–1890 1892–1893	Succeeded by Douglas Macarthur
Preceded by Douglas Macarthur	Member of Parliament for Rangitikei; 1884–1890 1892–1893	Succeeded by Jack Stevens
