= William Dawson (New Zealand politician) =

New Zealand politician

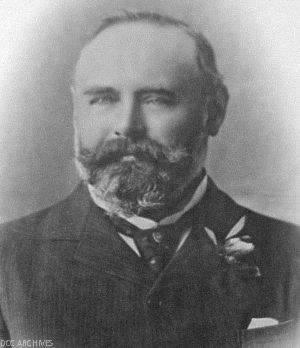

16th Mayor of Dunedin
- In office 1887–1888
- Preceded by: Richard Henry Leary
- Succeeded by: Hugh Gourley

Member of the New Zealand Parliament for Dunedin Suburbs
- In office 1890–1893

Personal details
- Born: January 1852 Aberdeen, Scotland
- Died: 27 July 1923 (aged 71) Wellington, New Zealand
- Party: Liberal
- Children: Three

William Dawson (January 1852 – 27 July 1923) was a 19th-century Liberal Party Member of Parliament in Dunedin, Otago, New Zealand.

== Early life ==
Dawson was born in Aberdeen, Scotland, in January 1852. He followed his father into the profession as a brewer.

== Political career ==
New Zealand Parliament
Years	Term	Electorate	Party
1890–93	11th	Dunedin Suburbs	Liberal

He was first elected to Dunedin City Council in 1885. Two years later, he was elected Mayor of Dunedin for one term. In 1892, he was again elected onto the city council.

He represented the Dunedin Suburbs electorate in Parliament from 1890 to 1893, when he retired.

Political offices
Preceded by Richard Henry Leary	Mayor of Dunedin; 1887–1888	Succeeded by Hugh Gourley
