= Bruce Park Scenic Reserve =

Coordinates: 39°57′41″S 175°31′56″E

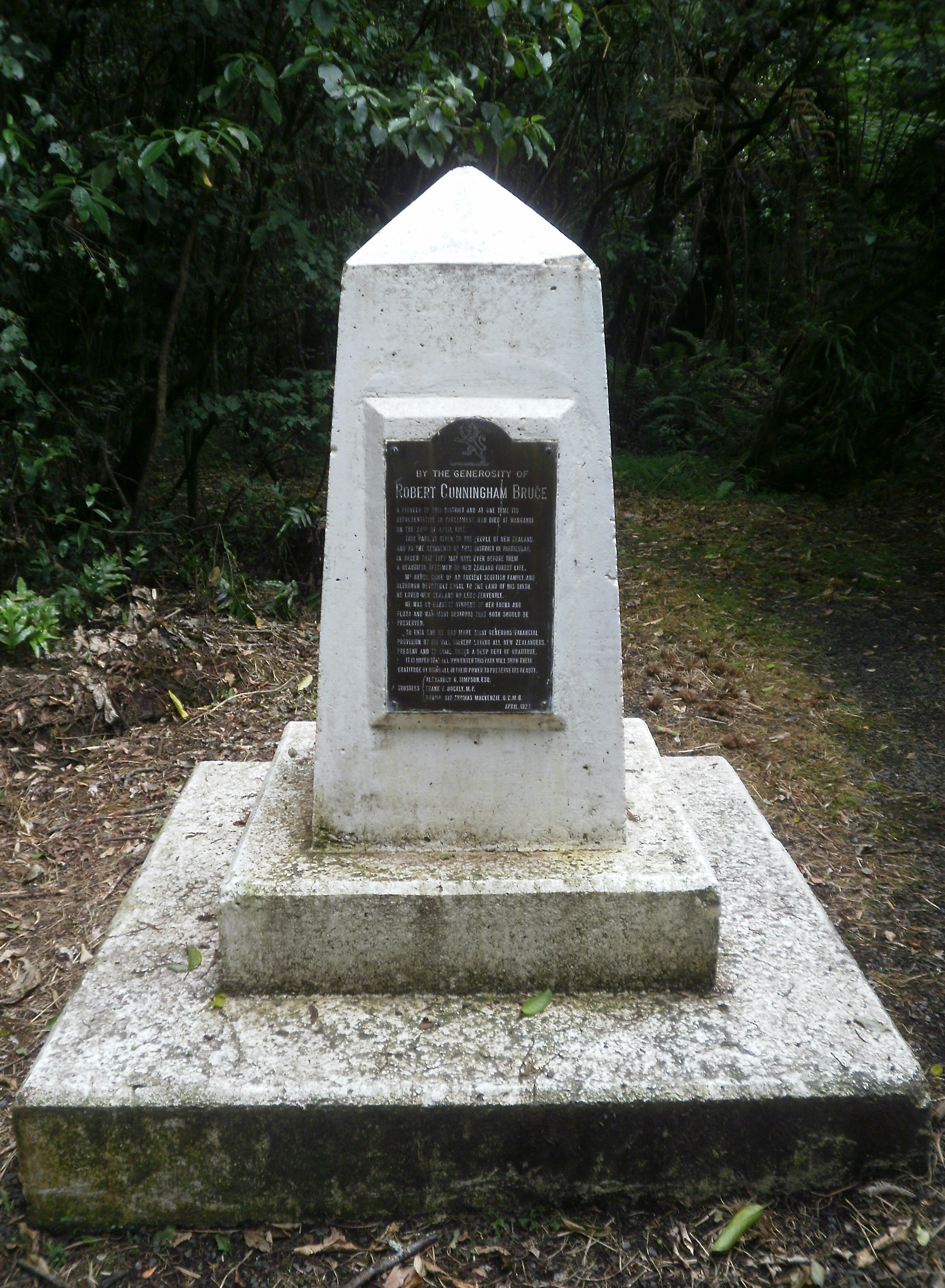
Memorial to Robert Cunningham Bruce within the reserve

Bruce Park Scenic Reserve is located near Hunterville in the Rangitikei District of the North Island of New Zealand.

The park is named after Robert Cunningham Bruce, who gifted the forest remnant to the public.

The remnant contains a variety of native flora including rimu, tōtara and kahikatea trees.
