= William Murray (Newcastle-under-Lyme MP) =

British Conservative politician

William Murray (1796–?) was a British Conservative politician who sat in the House of Commons from 1859 to 1865.

At the 1859 general election Murray was elected unopposed as one of the two Members of Parliament (MPs) for Newcastle-under-Lyme. However, he did not stand again at the 1865 general election.

Parliament of the United Kingdom
Preceded by Samuel Christy-Miller; William Jackson	Member of Parliament for Newcastle-under-Lyme; 1859 – 1865; With: William Jackson	Succeeded by William Shepherd Allen; Sir Edmund Buckley, Bt
