= Job Vile =

New Zealand politician

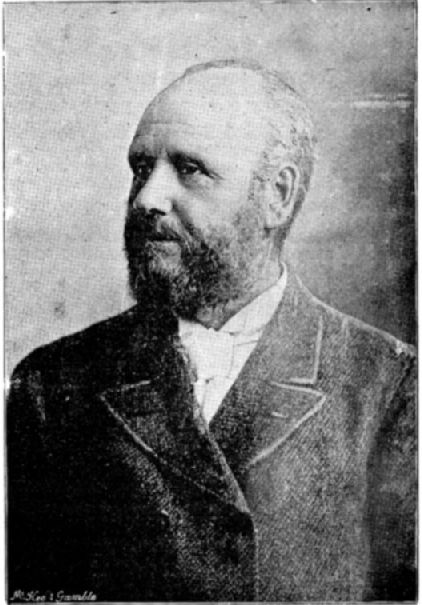

1st Chairman of Pahiatua County Council
- In office 1888–1890
- Succeeded by: Samuel Bolton

1st Mayor of Pahiatua
- In office 1892–1893
- Succeeded by: Harold Smith
- In office January – November 1895
- Preceded by: Harold Smith
- Succeeded by: David Crewe

Member of the New Zealand Parliament for Manawatu
- In office 25 November 1902 – 6 December 1905
- Preceded by: Jack Stevens
- Succeeded by: Jack Stevens

Personal details
- Born: 1845 North Curry, Somerset, England
- Died: 6 December 1905 (aged 60) Marton, New Zealand
- Party: Independent
- Spouse: Helen Bland Rayner (m. 1866)
- Relations: Sonja Davies (great-granddaughter)
- Children: 12

Job Vile (1845 – 6 December 1905) was an independent conservative Member of Parliament in New Zealand, representing the Manawatu electorate between 1902 and 1905. He served as the first chairman of Pahiatua Country Council, and the first mayor of Pahiatua.

== Early life and family ==
Born in North Curry, Somerset, England, in 1845, Vile was the son of John Vile and Ann Foster. In 1856, the family emigrated to New Zealand on the Anne Wilson, arriving in Wellington and first settling in the Hutt Valley. However, after flooding in 1858, they moved to the Wairarapa, eventually purchasing land to farm near present-day Carterton.

On 15 June 1866, Vile married Helen Bland Rayner, and the couple went on to have 12 children. The trade unionist and politician Sonja Davies was Vile's great-granddaughter.

== Business activities ==
By 1873, Vile was in business as a carrier, operating coaches between Wellington and Wairarapa. Over the years the length of his run decreased as the railway line was extended. Between 1893 and 1895, he ran a coach line servicing the coastal route from Hāwera to New Plymouth. Vile purchased the Hastings Standard newspaper in 1897, and his son, Arthur, became the manager and editor. However, the paper was sold in 1899.

== Political career ==
=== Local politics ===
Vile began his involvement in local-body politics as one of the first members of the Masterton Borough Council after the town achieved that status in 1877. He later served as the first chairman of the Pahiatua County Council from 1888 to 1890, and continued as a council member for a further three years. He was the first mayor of the borough of Pahiatua, serving two separate terms: from 1892 to 1893; and from January to November in 1895.

A long-time temperance advocate, Vile served as "chief ruler" of the Pahiatua Rechabite Lodge.

=== New Zealand Parliament ===
New Zealand Parliament
Years	Term	Electorate	Party
1902–1905	15th	Manawatu	Independent

At the 1902 general election, Vile stood as an independent for the Manawatu electorate, defeating the incumbent, Jack Stevens of the Liberal Party, by 1,691 votes to 1,515. He campaigned as an independent, but when addressing a meeting in Marton he pledged that in the event of a no-confidence motion he would vote against the Liberal Party government. At a later meeting in Foxton he credited the government for some of their legislation which he supported, but criticised it for its administration, particularly for the length of time it took bills to pass. During the term, he criticised the government, and in particular wasteful public spending. He again contested the seat at the 1905 election against John Stevens, who this time defeated Vile 2404 votes to 2045, a majority of 359. A third candidate, Oswald Gardner, standing as an independent, garnered 233 votes. However, Vile died suddenly from heart failure at Marton on the day of the election (6 December 1905), before the results were released. He was buried at Mangatainoka Pahiatua Cemetery.

New Zealand Parliament
Preceded by Jack Stevens	Member of Parliament for Manawatu; 1902–1905	Succeeded by Jack Stevens
