= Manawatu (electorate) =

Manawatu was a parliamentary electorate in the Manawatū-Whanganui region of New Zealand that existed during three periods between 1871 and 1996.

== Population centres ==
The 1870 electoral redistribution was undertaken by a parliamentary select committee based on population data from the 1867 New Zealand census. Eight sub-committees were formed, with two members each making decisions for their own province; thus members set their own electorate boundaries. The number of electorates was increased from 61 to 72, and Manawatu was one of the new electorates.

== History ==
The electorate existed during three periods: from 1871 to 1890, 1896 to 1911, and 1919 to 1996.

The first representative was Walter Johnston, who was elected at the 1871 general election. He won the three subsequent general elections, and retired at the end of the parliamentary term in 1884. In the 1876 election, Johnston was challenged by the lawyer, naturalist and ornithologist Walter Buller. The contest was close and Buller had a small majority in the district of two votes, but the voters from Wellington who were eligible to vote in the Manawatu and who made the arduous journey (the route was affected by recent flooding) to the nearest polling booth in Paikakariki gave Johnston the advantage. Johnston was succeeded by Douglas Hastings Macarthur in the 1884 general election. Macarthur held the electorate for two terms until 1890, when it was abolished. He successfully contested Rangitikei in the 1890 general election.

The electorate was recreated for the 1896 general election, when John Stevens got elected for the Liberal Party. He represented it until the 1902 general election, when he was defeated by Job Vile. Vile lost the electorate again at the 1905 general election to Stevens, who held it until 1908. In the 1908 general election, Stevens was defeated by the conservative politician Edward Newman in a second ballot. The electorate was abolished in 1911.

The electorate was recreated in for the 1919 general election, when John Stevens was once again successful. He held the electorate for one term. He was succeeded by Joseph Linklater in the 1922 general election. Linklater held the electorate for four parliamentary terms until 1935. In the 1935 general election, he was defeated by Labour's Lorrie Hunter, who held the electorate for one term.

Hunter lost the electorate in the 1938 general election to National's John Cobbe, who retired in 1943. He was succeeded by Matthew Oram until 1957.

=== Members of Parliament ===
Manawatu was represented by 16 Members of Parliament.

Key

Independent	Conservative	Liberal	Reform
Labour	National	Alliance	Liberal

Election	Winner
1871 election	Walter Johnston
1876 election	Walter Johnston
1879 election	Walter Johnston
1881 election	Walter Johnston
1884 election	Douglas Macarthur
1887 election	Douglas Macarthur
(Electorate abolished 1890–1896)
1896 election	John Stevens
1899 election	John Stevens
1902 election	Job Vile
1905 election	John Stevens
1908 election	Edward Newman
(Electorate abolished 1911–1919)
1919 election	Edward Newman
1922 election	Joseph Linklater
1925 election	Joseph Linklater
1928 election	Joseph Linklater
1931 election	Joseph Linklater
1935 election	Lorrie Hunter
1938 election	John Cobbe
1943 election	Matthew Oram
1946 election	Matthew Oram
1949 election	Matthew Oram
1951 election	Matthew Oram
1954 election	Matthew Oram
1957 election	Blair Tennent
1960 election	Blair Tennent
1963 election	Blair Tennent
1966 election	Les Gandar
1969 election	Les Gandar
1972 election	Allan McCready
1975 election	Allan McCready
1978 election	Michael Cox
1981 election	Michael Cox
1984 election	Michael Cox
1987 election	David Robinson
1990 election	Hamish MacIntyre
1993 election	Jill White
(Electorate abolished in 1996; see Rangitīkei)

== Election results ==
=== 1943 election ===
1943 general election: Manawatu
Party	Candidate	Votes	%	±%
National	Matthew Oram	6,304	56.85	
Labour	William Henry Oliver	3,999	36.06	
Independent	Septimus James Edgar Closey	675	6.08	
Informal votes		110	0.99	+0.35
Majority		2,305	20.78	
Turnout		11,088	90.42	−1.95
Registered electors		12,262		

=== 1938 election ===
1938 general election: Manawatu
Party	Candidate	Votes	%	±%
National	John Cobbe	6,245	57.20	
Labour	Lorrie Hunter	4,601	42.14	+10.43
Informal votes		70	0.64	−0.08
Majority		1,644	15.06	
Turnout		10,916	92.37	+1.76
Registered electors		11,817		

=== 1935 election ===
1935 general election: Manawatu
Party	Candidate	Votes	%	±%
Labour	Lorrie Hunter	2,958	31.71	−2.44
Reform	Joseph Linklater	2,929	31.40	−34.45
Independent	Septimus James Edgar Closey	1,271	13.62	
Democrat	Matthew Oram	673	7.21	
Independent	John Knowles Hornblow	618	6.62	
Informal votes		68	0.72	+0.13
Majority		30	0.32	
Turnout		8,452	90.61	−9.18
Registered electors		9,327		

=== 1931 election ===
1931 general election: Manawatu
Party	Candidate	Votes	%	±%
Reform	Joseph Linklater	4,666	65.85	
Labour	Lorrie Hunter	2,420	34.15	
Informal votes		42	0.59	
Majority		2,246	31.70	
Turnout		7,128	81.43	
Registered electors		8,753		

=== 1928 election ===
1928 general election: Manawatu
Party	Candidate	Votes	%	±%
Reform	Joseph Linklater	3,401	44.01	
United	Patrick James Small	1,935	25.04	
Labour	John Henry Taylor	1,634	21.15	
Independent	Henry Joseph Dalton McManaway	757	9.80	
Majority		1,466	18.97	
Informal votes		70	0.90	
Turnout		7,797	89.06	
Registered electors		8,755		

=== 1899 election ===
1899 general election: Manawatu
Party	Candidate	Votes	%	±%
Liberal	John Stevens	1,732	52.23	
Conservative	Robert Bruce	1,584	47.77	
Majority		148	4.46	
Turnout		3,316	73.66	
Registered electors		4,502		
