= Walter Johnston (New Zealand politician) =

New Zealand politician (1839–1907)

The Honourable Walter Johnston
- Born: Walter Woods Johnston; 10 August 1839; London, England
- Died: 31 August 1907 (aged 68); Wellington, New Zealand
- Education: France
- Occupations: Merchant and runholder, MP
- Organization(s): Levin & Co, Johnston & Co
- Parent: Henrietta and John Johnston
- Relatives: brothers Charles and Sydney Johnston

Walter Woods Johnston (10 August 1839 – 31 August 1907) was a prominent merchant in 19th-century Wellington, a Member of Parliament for the Manawatu region of New Zealand and a Minister of the Crown.

== Family and immigration ==
Johnston was born in London, the eldest child of the Hon. John Johnston, M.L.C., and his wife Charlotte Henrietta Hatton. He came to New Zealand as a young boy on the Prince of Wales, arriving on 3 January 1843 in Wellington with his parents John and Henrietta, his younger brother Sydney and a sister who was born during the journey. Johnston married in Wellington on 24 February 1868, Cecilia Augusta, second daughter of Forster Goring. (Note: fourth son of Sir Charles Forster Goring, Bart., by his marriage with the Hon. Sidney Eloisa Yelverton, daughter of the third Viscount Avonmore) There were four daughters and three sons.

== Johnston & Co and Levin & Co ==
On his return from education in France he worked in his father's stock and station agency, Johnston & Co but in March 1868 he joined with Charles Pharazyn and William Levin as partners in W H Levin & Co when Nathaniel William Levin retired to return to England. Pharazyn left after two years but Johnston stayed with Willie Levin until 1878 when following his own father's retirement he moved back to his brother Charles in Johnston & Co, the firm their father had started, the pair making it a major importing and exporting business with branches throughout central New Zealand.

== Bank of New Zealand ==
Johnston joined the board of the Bank of New Zealand in 1888 when he was appointed by bank shareholders to a committee to investigate and bring the bank's affairs onto a sounder basis. When in 1894 its head office was moved to New Zealand from London he became a shareholder as well as a director of the bank.

== Castlepoint station ==
He acquired Castlepoint station in the Wairarapa in 1876 while with W H Levin & Co and inherited further property in southern Hawkes Bay from his father. He bought a 1200-acre estate near Awahuri in Manawatu County in 1888 and built a large house, Highden, there before the turn of the century.

== Politician ==
New Zealand Parliament
Years	Term	Electorate	Party
1871–1875	5th	Manawatu	Independent
1876–1879	6th	Manawatu	Independent
1879–1881	7th	Manawatu	Independent
1881–1884	8th	Manawatu	Independent

He represented the Manawatu electorate from 1871 to 1884, when he retired taking his children to England for five years to be educated. Johnston was a cabinet minister in 1881–84 in the Hall, Whitaker and Atkinson Ministries; Postmaster-General, Telegraphs and Public Works. His youngest brother Charles Johnston was also an MP.

== Character ==
New Zealand's Dictionary of national biography reports that he was "an excellent, clear and concise speaker", "the most popular (MP in the House)" and that the few other reports "highlight his integrity, geniality and unassuming demeanour".

== Death ==
Walter Woods Johnston died at his house in Hobson Street, Wellington 31 August 1907, of pneumonia. Cecilia his widow died at Highden Awahuri 22 December 1922.

== Notes ==
Political offices
Preceded by John Hall	Postmaster-General; 1881–1882	Succeeded by Thomas Dick
Preceded by John Hall	Commissioner of Telegraphs; 1881–1882	Position abolished
New Zealand Parliament
New constituency	Member of Parliament for Manawatu; 1871–1884	Succeeded by Douglas Hastings Macarthur
