= William Fraser (New Zealand politician, born 1827) =

New Zealand politician

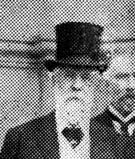
Colonel William Fraser

William Fraser (1827–1901) was a 19th-century Liberal Party Member of Parliament in the Auckland Region, New Zealand.

== Biography ==
New Zealand Parliament
Years	Term	Electorate	Party
1884–1887	9th	Thames	Independent
1887–1890	10th	Thames	Independent
1891–1893	11th	Te Aroha	Liberal

He was born in Inverness, Scotland, in 1827.

He was Mayor of Thames in 1882–1887. He represented the Thames electorate in Parliament from 1884 to 1890.

In the 1890 general election, he was defeated for the Te Aroha electorate by William Shepherd Allen. Allen's election was declared void on 3 April 1891. Fraser won the resulting 9 July 1891 by-election and represented the electorate until the end of the term in 1893.

== Notes ==
New Zealand Parliament
Preceded by John Sheehan	Member of Parliament for Thames; 1884–1890	Succeeded by Alfred Cadman
Preceded by William Shepherd Allen	Member of Parliament for Te Aroha; 1891–1893	Constituency abolished
