= Douglas Hastings Macarthur =

New Zealand politician (1839–1892)

Douglas Hastings Macarthur (1839 – 24 May 1892) was a 19th-century independent conservative Member of Parliament in the Manawatū region of New Zealand.

New Zealand Parliament
Years	Term	Electorate	Party
1884–1887	9th	Manawatu	Conservative
1887–1890	10th	Manawatu	Conservative
1890–1892	11th	Rangitikei	Conservative

He represented the Manawatu electorate from 1884 to 1890, and then the Rangitikei electorate from 1890 to 1892, when he died. He briefly served as the mayor of Feilding in 1885, being elected unopposed following the resignation of Hugh L. Sherwill.

New Zealand Parliament
Preceded by Walter Johnston	Member of Parliament for Manawatu; 1884–1890	In abeyance Title next held by Jack Stevens
Preceded by Robert Bruce	Member of Parliament for Rangitikei; 1890–1892	Succeeded by Robert Bruce
