= Dunedin Suburbs =

Dunedin Suburbs is a former parliamentary electorate in the city of Dunedin in Otago, New Zealand from 1890 to 1893. The electorate was represented by one Member of Parliament, William Dawson, representing the Liberal Party.

== Population centres ==
In December 1887, the House of Representatives voted to reduce its membership from general electorates from 91 to 70. The 1890 electoral redistribution used the same 1886 census data used for the 1887 electoral redistribution. In addition, three-member electorates were introduced in the four main centres. This resulted in a major restructuring of electorates, and Dunedin Suburbs was one of four electorates to be first created for the 1890 election. It covered the area north, west and south of the City of Dunedin electorate, including North East Valley, Leith Valley, and South Dunedin. Dunedin Suburbs incorporated the vast majority of the former Roslyn electorate.

In the 1892 electoral redistribution, the Dunedin Suburbs electorate was abolished again. Its southern area mostly went to the City of Dunedin electorate, and some areas went to the Caversham electorate. Northern and eastern areas were taken into the new Chalmers electorate, and small areas went to the new Waikouaiti electorate.

== History ==
The 1890 election was contested by William Dawson, Archibald Hilson Ross, and Francis Wilkinson. Dawson had previously been Mayor of Dunedin (1887–1888). Ross was the incumbent from the Roslyn electorate, and had been Mayor of Dunedin in 1880–1881. Dawson won the election by a large majority.

At the end of the parliamentary term in 1893, the Dunedin Suburbs electorate was abolished.

=== Members of Parliament ===
Election	Winner
1890 election	William Dawson

== Election results ==
=== 1890 election ===
1890 general election: Dunedin Suburbs
Party	Candidate	Votes	%	±%
Liberal	William Dawson	877	63.09	
Conservative	Archibald Hilson Ross	457	32.88	
Independent	Francis Wilkinson	56	4.03	
Majority		420	30.22	
Turnout		1,390	51.37	
Registered electors		2,706		
