= William Shepherd Allen =

British politician (1831–1915)

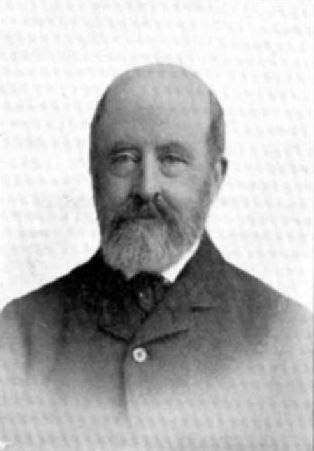
- W. S. Allen 1912

Member of Parliament for Newcastle-under-Lyme
- In office 1865–1886
- Preceded by: William Murray; William Jackson
- Succeeded by: Douglas Harry Coghill

Member of the New Zealand Parliament for Te Aroha
- In office 1890–1891
- Preceded by: new constituency
- Succeeded by: William Fraser

Personal details
- Born: 22 June 1831 Manchester, England
- Died: 15 January 1915 (aged 83) Cheadle, Staffordshire
- Resting place: St Giles the Abbot's Churchyard, Cheadle
- Party: Liberal Party (UK) (until 1886)
- Children: 10
- Relatives: John Candlish (father-in-law); William Allen (son); Stephen Allen (son); John Manchester Allen (grandson)
- Education: Wadham College, Oxford

William Shepherd Allen (22 June 1831 – 15 January 1915) was an English Liberal politician. He also worked as a farmer and served as an MP in New Zealand.

== Biography ==
Allen was born in Manchester. Cheadle. Allen was educated at Wadham College, Oxford. He graduated with a BA in law and history in 1854, and an MA in 1857.

In 1869, Allen married Elizabeth Penelope Candlish, the daughter of John Candlish MP for Sunderland. Their eldest son William was later MP for Newcastle-under-Lyme. Another son, Colonel Sir Stephen Allen, (1882–1964) was a New Zealand lawyer, farmer, local body politician, and mayor of Morrinsville. He served in World War I and in the Territorial Army, and was administrator of the colony of Western Samoa (now Samoa) 1928–31.

He was a devout Methodist and wrote several religious papers.

In 1865 Allen was elected as member of parliament for Newcastle-under-Lyme as a member of the Liberal Party. He held this seat until 1886 when he broke with his party over its stance on Home Rule for Ireland and became a Liberal Unionist.

In 1885 Allen had visited New Zealand and purchased land. By 1890 he had purchased up 4,300 acres (1,700 ha), had 2,000 head of sheep, and 600 head of mixed cattle. Allen returned to England several times and was not living at Annandale until c.1895.

In 1890 he was elected MP for Te Aroha in New Zealand, but he was unseated by petition due to an irregularity created by his agent. He returned to England and was re-elected to the House of Commons in 1891. In 1893 he contested the Parnell electorate in New Zealand but lost the election. He served as member of the Piako County Council from 1895 to 1896 before resigning to travel to England.

He died at Cheadle on 15 January 1915 at the age of 83 and is buried at St Giles the Abbot's Churchyard in Cheadle. His wife died in 1922.

== Publications ==
- The Teaching of Christ With Respect to the Future Punishment of the Wicked
- The present position of Wesleyan Methodism: The causes of its decreasing numbers, and the means which must be adopted to secure an increase

Parliament of the United Kingdom
| Preceded by William Murray; William Jackson | Member of Parliament for Newcastle-under-Lyme; 1865–1886; With: Edmund Buckley 1865–1878; Samuel Rathbone Edge 1878–1880; Charles Donaldson-Hudson 1880–1885 | Succeeded by Douglas Coghill |
New Zealand Parliament
| New constituency | Member of Parliament for Te Aroha; 1890–1891 | Succeeded by William Fraser |
