= 1890 New Zealand general election =

1890 general election
- 27 November (Māori) & 5 December (general) 1890

All 74 seats in the New Zealand House of Representatives 38 seats were needed for a majority
- Turnout: 80.4%
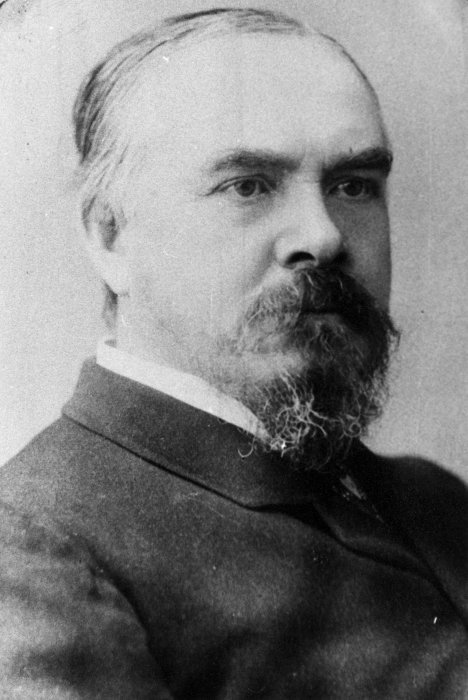

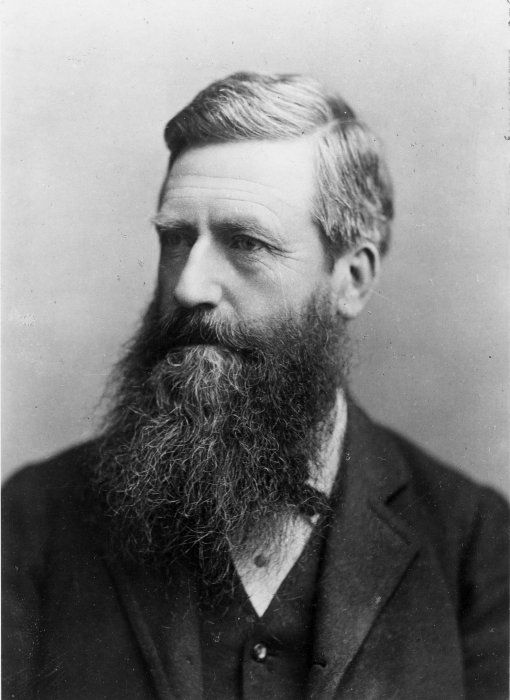
	First party	Second party
Leader	John Ballance	Harry Atkinson
Party	Liberal	Conservative
Leader since	6 July 1889	25 September 1883
Leader's seat	Wanganui	Egmont
Last election	34 seats	52 seats
Seats won	40	25
Seat change	▲6	▼27
Popular vote	76,548	39,338
Percentage	56.1%	28.9%
- Results of the election.
Premier before election
Harry Atkinson
Conservative
Subsequent Premier
John Ballance
Liberal

The 1890 New Zealand general election was one of New Zealand's most significant. It marked the beginning of party politics in New Zealand with the formation of the Liberal Government, which was to enact major welfare, labour and electoral reforms, including giving the vote to women.

It was also the first election in which there was no legal plural voting. Multi-member electorates were re-introduced in the four main centres and the 'country quota' (which gave more weight to rural votes) was increased to 28%.

Following the election and the resignation of the previous government headed by Harry Atkinson, John Ballance formed the first Liberal Party ministry, taking office on 24 January 1891. At this stage no formal party organisation existed, but the formation of the Liberal ministry signalled the end of the system by which governments were made up of a loose and unstable coalition of independent MPs and the beginning of the 'party system'.

== Electoral redistribution ==
In December 1887, the House of Representatives voted to reduce its membership from general electorates from 91 to 70. The 1890 electoral redistribution used the same 1886 census data used for the 1887 electoral redistribution. In addition, three-member electorates were introduced in the four main centres. This resulted in a major restructuring of electorates, with 12 new electorates created. Of those, four electorates were created for the first time: Te Aroha, Halswell, Dunedin Suburbs, and Palmerston. The remaining eight electorates had previously existed and were re-created through the 1890 electoral redistribution: City of Auckland, City of Christchurch, City of Dunedin, City of Wellington, Ellesmere, Franklin, Geraldine, and Westland.

74 MPs were elected to the 11th session of the New Zealand Parliament. The Māori electorates voted on 27 November and the European (now known as General) electorates on 5 December. There were 183,171 voters registered in the sixty-two European electorates, which returned a total of 70 members. This figure includes 13,668 voters in the six electorates where there was an unopposed return. 136,337 valid votes were cast in European electorates, including additional votes cast in the four three-member electorates.

== Results ==
=== Party totals ===
Note that as the election was held before the establishment of formal political parties, the figures should only be regarded as an approximate indication of the division of political opinion.

Election results
Party	Candidates	Total votes	Percentage	Seats won
Liberal	69	76,548	56.1%	40
Conservative	54	39,338	28.9%	25
Independent	56	20,451	15.0%	9
Total	179	136,337		74

=== Votes summary ===
Popular vote
Liberal	56.1%
Conservatives	28.9%
Independents	15.0%

Parliament seats
Liberal	54.1%
Conservatives	33.8%
Independents	12.2%

Mackie and Rose suggest there was a 74.4% turnout, based on valid votes cast as a percentage of the registered electors. The official turnout figure is 80.4%, calculated on a different basis (see the Elections New Zealand official results web-site link below for further details of the changing methods used to calculate the official turnout).

The Māori vote, for the remaining four seats, was held on 27 November. Maori electorates did not have electoral rolls so their voting figures and percentages are not included above.

=== Electorate results ===
The following table shows the results of the 1890 general election. Six European members were returned unopposed.

Key

Liberal Conservative Liberal–Labour Independent Liberal Independent

Electorate results for the 1890 New Zealand general election
Electorate	Incumbent	Winner	Majority	Runner up
General electorates
Akaroa	Alexander McGregor	John Joyce	107	Alexander McGregor
Ashburton	William Campbell Walker	Edward George Wright	16	Rev. James Wright Sawle
Ashley	John Verrall	Richard Meredith	38	James Dupré Lance
City of Auckland	New electorate	William Lee Rees	260	Adam Porter
City of Auckland	New electorate	Thomas Thompson	442	William Joseph Napier
City of Auckland	New electorate	John Shera	1,013	James Wallis
Avon	Edwin Blake		186	George Stead
Awarua	Joseph Ward		Uncontested	
Bay of Islands	Richard Hobbs	Robert Houston	11	James Trounsen
Bruce	Crawford Anderson	James William Thomson	494	James Smith
Buller	Eugene O'Conor		Uncontested	
City of Christchurch	New electorate	William Pember Reeves	802	John Tippett Smith
City of Christchurch	New electorate	Westby Perceval	945	Edward Wingfield Humphreys
City of Christchurch	New electorate	Richard Molesworth Taylor	2,494	Eden George
Clutha	Thomas Mackenzie		Uncontested	
Dunedin Suburbs	New electorate	William Dawson	420	Archibald Hilson Ross
City of Dunedin	New electorate	David Pinkerton	348	James Allen
City of Dunedin	New electorate	Henry Fish	995	Richard Henry Leary
City of Dunedin	New electorate	William Hutchison	998	Alfred Lee Smith
East Coast	Alexander Creighton Arthur	William Kelly	14	Alexander Creighton Arthur
Eden	Edwin Mitchelson		91	Joseph Greenwood
Egmont	Harry Atkinson		305	Felix McGuire
Ellesmere	New electorate	John Hall	105	John McLachlan
Franklin	Ebenezer Hamlin		102	Benjamin Harris
Geraldine	New electorate	Arthur Rhodes	323	Searby Buxton
Grey	Arthur Guinness		19	William Hugh Jones
Halswell	New electorate	William Rolleston	200	Francis Samuel Parker
Hawke's Bay	William Russell		659	Charles William Reardon
Heathcote	Frederic Jones	William Tanner	212	Heaton Rhodes
Hutt	New electorate	Alfred Newman	178	George Thomas London
Inangahua	Richard Reeves		1	John Drake
Invercargill	Henry Feldwick	James Kelly	116	James Walker Bain
Kaiapoi	Edward Richardson	Richard Moore	387	William Hoban
Manukau	Sir Maurice O'Rorke	Frank Buckland	80	Sir Maurice O'Rorke
Marsden	Robert Thompson		176	Albert Elliot
Masterton	George Beetham	Alexander Hogg	18	George Beetham
Mataura	George Richardson		123	John Gideon Fraser
Mount Ida	Scobie Mackenzie		105	Vincent Pyke
Napier	John Davies Ormond	George Swan	133	Michael Gannon
Nelson	Joseph Harkness		15	John Kerr
New Plymouth	Oliver Samuel	Edward Smith	23	John Elliot
Newton	David Goldie		Uncontested	
Oamaru	Thomas Hislop	Tom Duncan	470	Thomas Hislop
Palmerston	New electorate	James Wilson	61	Frederick Pirani
Parnell	Frank Lawry (Note: Lawry stood in support of the Atkinson Ministry but changed allegiance to the Liberals in 1891)		209	James Marshall Lennox
Peninsula	William Larnach	William Earnshaw	128	William Larnach
Port Chalmers	James Mills		227	John A. Millar
Rangitikei	Robert Bruce	Douglas Macarthur	32	Francis Arkwright
Selwyn	John Hall	Alfred Saunders	51	Thomas Anson
Taieri	Walter Carncross		124	William Snow
Te Aroha	New electorate	William Allen	175	William Fraser
Thames	William Fraser	Alfred Cadman	104	Edmund Taylor
Timaru	William Hall-Jones		52	Edward George Kerr
Tuapeka	James Clark Brown	Hugh Valentine	63	James Clark Brown
Waikato	John Bryce		Uncontested	
Waimate	William Steward		296	Alpheus Hayes
Waimea-Sounds	Arthur Seymour	Charlie Mills	210	Richmond Hursthouse
Waipawa	Thomas Tanner	William Cowper Smith	349	George Hunter
Wairarapa	Wally Buchanan		275	Henry Bunny
Wairau	Henry Dodson	Lindsay Buick	77	Arthur Seymour
Waitaki	Tom Duncan	John McKenzie	352	John Buckland
Waitemata	Richard Monk	Jackson Palmer	91	Richard Monk
Waitotara	George Hutchison		22	Robert Bruce
Wakatipu	Thomas Fergus		Uncontested	
Wallace	Samuel Hodgkinson	James Mackintosh	178	Samuel Hodgkinson
Wanganui	John Ballance		27	Gilbert Carson
Wellington, City of	New electorate	George Fisher	183	Francis Bell
Wellington, City of	New electorate	John Duthie	561	Edwin Jellicoe
Wellington, City of	New electorate	Kennedy Macdonald	727	Francis Fraser
Westland	New electorate	Richard Seddon	338	Joseph Grimmond
Maori electorates (Note: The affiliation of many of the Maori candidates is unknown or uncertain)
Eastern Maori	James Carroll		185	Wi Pere
Northern Maori	Sydney Taiwhanga (Note: Sydney Taiwhanga won the election and, despite having died on election day, was declared elected. Taiwhanga also stood in Eastern Maori and came third)		267	Tinoti Pupipupi
Southern Maori	Tame Parata		(Note: Final results were not reported in contemporary media)	Honi Maaka Hape
Western Maori	Hoani Taipua		(Note: Final results were not reported in contemporary media)	Kipa Te Whatanui

Table footnotes:

== See also ==
- Elections in New Zealand
