= Waimarino (electorate) =

Waimarino was a New Zealand parliamentary electorate that existed from 1911 to 1954, and from 1963 to 1972. It was rural in nature and was represented by four Members of Parliament.

== Population centres ==
In the 1911 electoral redistribution, the North Island gained a further seat from the South Island due to faster population growth. In addition, there were substantial population movements within each island, and significant changes resulted from this. Only four electorates were unaltered, five electorates were abolished, one former electorate was re-established, and four electorates, including Waimarino, were created for the first time.

The Waimarino electorate was used in its initial form for the 1911 and 1914 elections. The electorate was rural without any urban areas. For the 1914 election, 73 polling stations were used, and at only 15 of them were more than 100 votes cast. These polling stations were in Taihape (878 votes), Ohakune (449), Raetihi (361), Manunui (331), Kakahi (279), Rangataua town hall (273), Ōwhango (270), Ohakune East (167), Fordell (163), Raurimu (158), Horopito (151), Upukongaroa [sic] (127), Umumuri (126), Piriaka (111), and Mataroa (107). The electorate's area stretched from the South Taranaki Bight to Lake Taupō (but not Taupō itself), and from Taihape in the south-east to just outside Taumarunui in the north-west.

In the 1918 Electoral Redistribution, the electorate moved further north. It no longer bordered onto the coast; that area was taken up by Rangitīkei, which incorporated Taihape. Taumarunui was now within the electorate.

The 1922 Electoral Redistribution resulted in only minimal boundary changes. Significantly, for the first time, part of the population in the electorate was classed as urban (2,144 of 14,587 people, or 14.7%).

The 1927 Electoral Redistribution, which took effect with the 1928 election, resulted in more significant boundary changes. The southern boundary moved further north, the boundary near Lake Taupō moved significantly further south, and land was gained in the north-west to near the North Taranaki Bight including the town of Ōhura. There was a slight decrease in the proportion of the population that was classed as urban (to 13.6%).

The 1937 Electoral Redistribution, which took effect with the 1938 election, resulted in more boundary changes. Taihape moved back into the Waimarino electorate. The easternmost part of the electorate went to the Rotorua electorate including Tūrangi. In the north, some area was gained from the Waitomo electorate. The proportion of the population classed as urban increased to 24.5%.

The 1946 Electoral Redistribution, which took effect with the 1946 election, resulted in very significant boundary changes. In 1945, the country quota had been abolished and as a result, mostly rural electorates like Waimarino had to increase significantly in area to compensate for this. Waimarino grew slightly to the south, significantly to the east, and very significantly to the north, and somewhat to the north-west. For the first time, Taupō was fully located within the electorate.

In the 1952 Electoral Redistribution, Waimarino was abolished and the area divided between Rotorua, Waitomo, Patea, and Rangitīkei. This took effect with the 1954 election.

Through the 1962 Electoral Redistribution, Waimarino was re-established mostly from areas that previously belonged to Pātea and Waitomo, but also small areas that had belonged to Stratford and Egmont. This took effect with the 1963 election. It had again a coastal boundary with the South Taranaki Bight. The western boundary stopped just short of Pātea. At the eastern end, Bulls came for the first time into the electorate. In the north, the electorate extended as far as Lake Taupō. Taumarunui was also again included within the electorate.

The 1967 Electoral Redistribution, which took effect with the 1969 election, saw the electorate lose some area to Egmont, but gain some area from Waitomo (including Ōhura) and Taupo.

In the 1972 Electoral Redistribution, Waimarino was abolished and the area divided mostly between Rangitīkei and King Country.

== History ==
The electorate of Waimarino was first created during the 1911 Electoral Redistribution. The South Island lost one electorate to the North Island in the redistribution, resulting in 42 and 34 European electorates, respectively. Significant population movements within the North Island resulted in significant adjustments, with only four electorates remaining unchanged. The Waimarino electorate initially covered areas that were previously covered by Taumarunui, Hawke's Bay, and Rangitikei.

Arthur Remington of the Liberal Party had held the Rangitikei electorate, but he died on 17 August 1909. The resulting 1909 by-election was contested by five candidates, with Frank Hockly as one of the opposition candidates leading Robbie Smith for the government by 1548 votes to 1055. At the time, the Second Ballot Act 1908 applied and since Hockly had not achieved an absolute majority, a second ballot between the two leading contenders was required. In the second contest, Smith had a majority of 400 votes over Hockly and was thus declared elected.

In the 1911 election, three candidates contested the new Waimarino electorate: Smith for the Liberal government, Hockly as the opposition candidate, and Joseph Ivess as an Independent Liberal. Smith and Hockly progressed to the second ballot, which was won by Smith with a 480 votes majority. In the 1922 election, Smith was defeated by Labour's Frank Langstone. In the 1925 election, Smith won it back, but was defeated again by Langstone in the 1928 election.

William Henry Wackrow, who had been nominated in 1922 for the Liberal Party in the Rotorua electorate but who withdrew shortly before the election unsuccessfully challenged Langstone in the 1931 election for the United Party.

Langstone transferred to the Auckland electorate of Roskill in the 1946 election, and Paddy Kearins became the new Labour representative. In 1953 Kearins crossed the floor of parliament and voted with the government to support the Licensing Amendment Bill (No. 2). This Bill proposed that the licensing of the King Country, part of Kearins' electorate, be subject to a referendum. Following the 1952 Electoral Redistribution, Kearins' electorate of Waimarino was abolished, which took effect for the 1954 election. The northern part of the electorate went to Rotorua, which included the towns of Taupō (which was previously located in Waimarino), Rotorua, and Tokoroa. However, at the candidate selection for Rotorua, Ray Boord won the nomination over Kearins and was subsequently elected, and "Labour lost its only farming voice... sacrificed by the party machine". The central and southern parts of the Waimarino electorate were split between Waitomo, Patea, and Rangitikei.

The 1962 Electoral Redistribution saw the re-establishment of the Waimarino electorate, which took effect with the 1963 election. National's Roy Jack, who had previously represented Patea, was the representative. Following the 1967 Electoral Redistribution, Waimarino was abolished, which took effect for the 1969 election.

== Members of Parliament ==
The electorate was represented by four Members of Parliament.

Key

Liberal Labour National

Election	Winner
1911 election	Robbie Smith
1914 election	Robbie Smith
1919 election	Robbie Smith
1922 election	Frank Langstone
1925 election	Robbie Smith (2nd period)
1928 election	Frank Langstone (2nd period)
1931 election	Frank Langstone (2nd period)
1935 election	Frank Langstone (2nd period)
1938 election	Frank Langstone (2nd period)
1943 election	Frank Langstone (2nd period)
1946 election	Paddy Kearins
1949 election	Paddy Kearins
1951 election	Paddy Kearins
(Electorate abolished 1954–1963, see Rotorua, Waitomo, Patea, and Rangitikei)
1963 election	Roy Jack
1966 election	Roy Jack
1969 election	Roy Jack
(Electorate abolished 1972, see Rangitikei and King Country)

== Election results ==
=== 1969 election ===
1969 general election: Waimarino
Party	Candidate	Votes	%	±%
National	Roy Jack	7,939	50.73	+0.54
Labour	Shaun Alex Cameron	5,726	36.59	+5.89
Social Credit	Graham Ross Dempsey	1,724	11.01	
Country Party	Clifford Stanley Emeny	258	1.64	
Majority		2,213	14.14	−5.34
Turnout		15,647	87.60	−1.96
Registered electors		17,860		

=== 1966 election ===
1966 general election: Waimarino
Party	Candidate	Votes	%	±%
National	Roy Jack	6,416	50.19	+0.87
Labour	Shaun Alex Cameron	3,925	30.70	
Social Credit	L V Luford	2,442	19.10	
Majority		2,491	19.48	+6.29
Turnout		12,783	85.64	−3.58
Registered electors		14,925		

=== 1963 election ===
1963 general election: Waimarino
Party	Candidate	Votes	%	±%
National	Roy Jack	6,673	49.32	
Labour	Olive Smuts-Kennedy	4,888	36.12	
Social Credit	Terence Gregory Mullins	1,721	12.72	
Liberal	John Duggan	247	1.82	
Majority		1,785	13.19	
Turnout		13,529	89.22	
Registered electors		15,162		

=== 1951 election ===
1951 general election: Waimarino
Party	Candidate	Votes	%	±%
Labour	Paddy Kearins	7,456	50.23	−0.47
National	Arthur MacPherson	7,389	49.77	+0.47
Majority		67	0.45	−0.95
Turnout		14,845	86.88	−5.16
Registered electors		17,086		

=== 1949 election ===
1949 general election: Waimarino
Party	Candidate	Votes	%	±%
Labour	Paddy Kearins	7,319	50.70	−1.96
National	Arthur MacPherson	7,117	49.30	
Majority		202	1.40	−3.90
Turnout		14,436	92.04	−0.93
Registered electors		15,683		

=== 1946 election ===
1946 general election: Waimarino
Party	Candidate	Votes	%	±%
Labour	Paddy Kearins	6,755	52.66	
National	Norman Robert Hill	6,074	47.34	
Majority		681	5.30	
Turnout		12,829	92.97	−0.34
Registered electors		13,798		

=== 1943 election ===
1943 general election: Waimarino
Party	Candidate	Votes	%	±%
Labour	Frank Langstone	5,352	54.70	−9.18
National	Roger Oswald Montgomerie	3,948	40.35	
People's Movement	Digby Perrett	381	3.89	
Informal votes		102	1.04	+0.42
Majority		1,404	14.35	−14.05
Turnout		9,783	93.31	−0.33
Registered electors		10,484		

=== 1938 election ===
1938 general election: Waimarino
Party	Candidate	Votes	%	±%
Labour	Frank Langstone	6,613	63.88	+3.82
National	Cecil Boles	3,673	35.48	−1.95
Informal votes		65	0.62	−0.02
Majority		2,940	28.40	−5.77
Turnout		10,351	93.64	+0.23
Registered electors		11,053		

=== 1935 election ===
1935 general election: Waimarino
Party	Candidate	Votes	%	±%
Labour	Frank Langstone	4,945	60.06	+6.25
Reform	Cecil Boles	3,082	37.43	
United	Henry William Bucknall Littlewood	206	2.50	
Informal votes		53	0.64	+0.06
Majority		1,863	22.63	+15.01
Turnout		8,286	93.41	+9.85
Registered electors		8,870		

=== 1931 election ===
1931 general election: Waimarino
Party	Candidate	Votes	%	±%
Labour	Frank Langstone	4,174	53.81	+7.42
United	William Henry Wackrow	3,583	46.19	
Informal votes		45	0.58	−0.02
Majority		591	7.62	−5.00
Turnout		7,802	83.56	−1.30
Registered electors		9,337		

=== 1928 election ===
1928 general election: Waimarino
Party	Candidate	Votes	%	±%
Labour	Frank Langstone	3,620	46.39	−2.43
United	Robbie Smith	2,635	33.77	−16.93
Independent	James Georgetti	1,500	19.22	
Informal votes		47	0.60	+0.12
Majority		985	12.62	
Turnout		7,802	84.86	−5.04
Registered electors		9,193		

=== 1925 election ===
1925 general election: Waimarino
Party	Candidate	Votes	%	±%
Liberal	Robbie Smith	3,751	50.70	+22.59
Labour	Frank Langstone	3,611	48.82	+8.32
Informal votes		36	0.48	−0.45
Majority		140	1.89	
Turnout		7,398	89.90	+2.84
Registered electors		8,229		

=== 1922 election ===
1922 general election: Waimarino
Party	Candidate	Votes	%	±%
Labour	Frank Langstone	2,900	40.50	−3.75
Liberal	Robbie Smith	2,013	28.11	−27.64
Reform	David Donald McLean	1,662	23.21	
Liberal–Labour	George James Goldfinch	507	7.08	
Independent Liberal	Henry William Bucknall Littlewood	10	0.13	
Informal votes		67	0.93	−0.46
Majority		887	12.38	
Turnout		7,159	87.06	+11.55
Registered electors		8,223		

=== 1919 election ===
1919 general election: Waimarino
Party	Candidate	Votes	%	±%
Liberal	Robbie Smith	3,116	55.75	−10.36
Labour	Frank Langstone	2,473	44.25	
Informal votes		79	1.39	+0.49
Majority		643	11.50	−20.72
Turnout		5,668	75.51	+7.49
Registered electors		7,506		

=== 1914 election ===
1914 general election: Waimarino
Party	Candidate	Votes	%	±%
Liberal	Robbie Smith	4,093	66.11	+16.85
Reform	Hugh Montgomerie Speed	2,098	33.89	
Informal votes		56	0.90	−0.13
Majority		1,995	32.22	+25.81
Turnout		6,247	68.02	−2.97
Registered electors		9,184		

=== 1911 election ===
1911 general election: Waimarino, first ballot
Party	Candidate	Votes	%	±%
Liberal	Robbie Smith	2,805	49.26	
Reform	Frank Hockly	2,440	42.85	
Independent Liberal	Joseph Ivess	449	7.89	
Informal votes		59	1.03	
Majority		365	6.41	
Turnout		5,753	70.99	
Registered electors		8,104		

1911 general election: Waimarino, second ballot
Party	Candidate	Votes	%	±%
Liberal	Robbie Smith	3,071	54.24	
Reform	Frank Hockly	2,591	45.76	
Informal votes		21	0.37	
Majority		480	8.48	
Turnout		5,683	70.13	
Registered electors		8,104		
