= Frank Hockly =

New Zealand politician

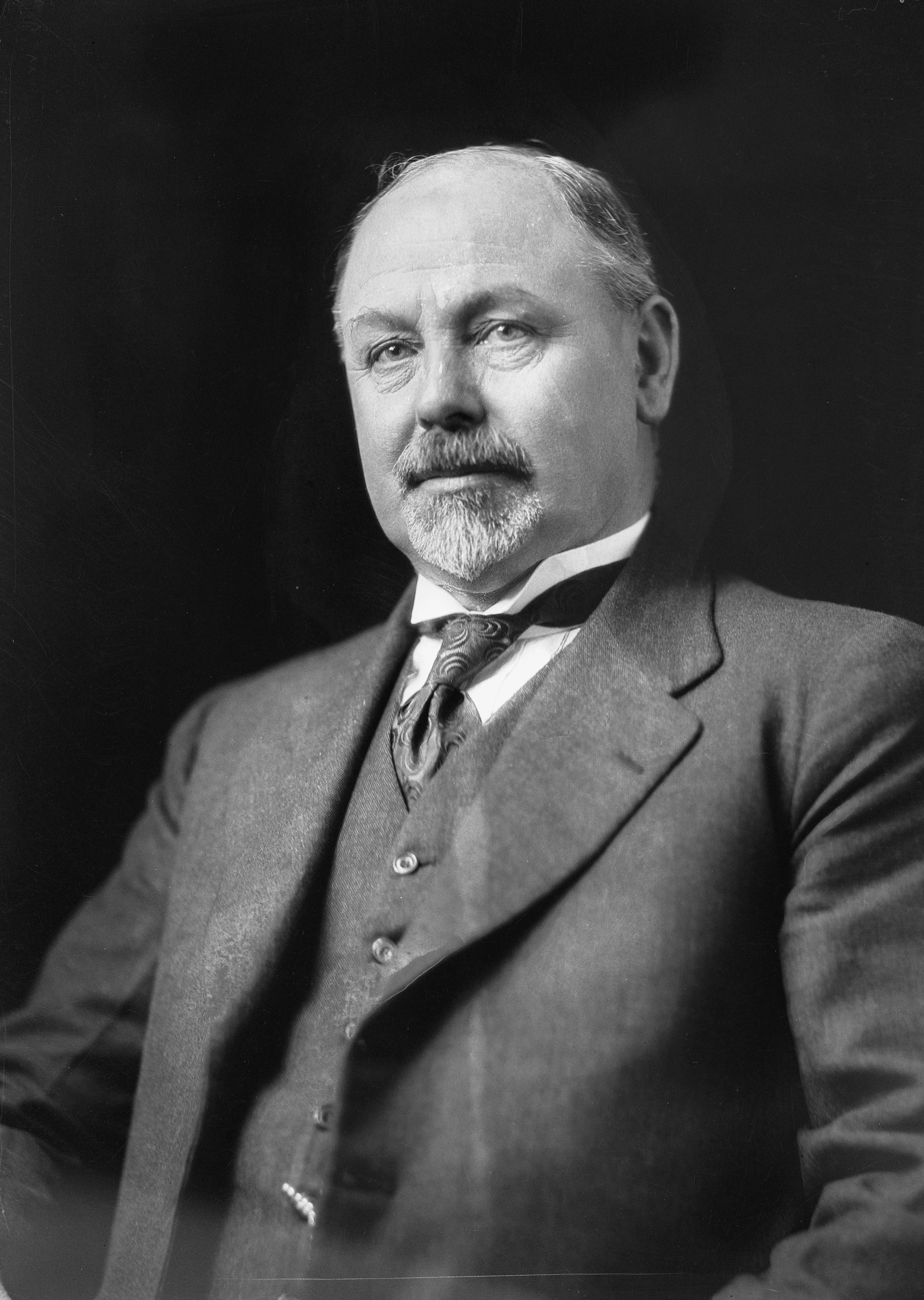
Frank Hockly in 1922

Frank Franklin Hockly (1865 – 7 October 1936) was a Reform Party Member of Parliament in New Zealand.

== Biography ==
New Zealand Parliament
Years	Term	Electorate	Party
1919–1922	20th	Rotorua	Reform
1922–1925	21st	Rotorua	Reform
1925–1928	22nd	Rotorua	Reform

Born in Orrell near Litherland, Lancashire, England, in 1865, Hockly emigrated to New Zealand in 1884.

Arthur Remington of the Liberal Party had held the Rangitikei electorate, but he died on 17 August 1909. The resulting 1909 by-election was contested by five candidates, with Hockly as one of the opposition candidates leading Robert William Smith for the government by 1548 votes to 1055. At the time, the Second Ballot Act 1908 applied and since Hockly had not achieved an absolute majority, a second ballot between the two leading contenders was required. In the second contest, Smith had a majority of 400 votes over Hockly and was thus declared elected.

In the 1911 election, three candidates contested the new Waimarino electorate: Smith for the Liberal government, Hockly as the opposition candidate, and Joseph Ivess as an Independent Liberal. Smith and Hockly progressed to the second ballot, which was won by Smith with a 480 votes majority.

Hockly was elected to the Rotorua electorate in the 1919 general election, but was defeated in 1928. He was Chairman of Committees from 1926 to 1928.

In 1935, he was awarded the King George V Silver Jubilee Medal. He died in Auckland in 1936 and was buried in Waikumete Cemetery.

== Notes ==
Political offices
Preceded by Alexander Young	Chairman of Committees of the House of Representatives; 1926–1928	Succeeded by Sydney George Smith
New Zealand Parliament
New constituency	Member of Parliament for Rotorua; 1919–1928	Succeeded by Cecil Clinkard
