= Rangitikei by-election =

Rangitikei by-election may refer to several by-elections in the history of the Rangitikei electorate.

- Rangitikei by-election, 1865
- Rangitikei by-election, 1868
- Rangitikei by-election, 1875
- Rangitikei by-election, 1880
- Rangitikei by-election, 1892
- Rangitikei by-election, 1909
- Rangitikei by-election, 1978
