= Robert Hornblow =

Robert Edward Hornblow (14 June 1861 – 21 October 1937) was a New Zealand politician, auctioneer, reporter and newspaper proprietor.

== Business career ==
Hornblow was born in Wellington in 1861, the son of Charles William Hornblow. He grew up in Greytown in the Wairarapa. He received little education and started work from the age of ten. He was an apprentice at the Greytown Standard for six years and in 1882, he worked as a compositor for the New Zealand Times in Wellington. He returned to Greytown and worked at the Greytown Standard as a reporter. This was followed by a short period of the Greytown representative for the New Zealand Times, and four years each at the Wairarapa Star and the Wairarapa Daily. He started his own printing business in 1891 in Masterton and sold it in 1894. He then became an auctioneer and land agent.

In later life, he owned newspapers in Mangaweka, Dargaville, Whangārei, Rawene, and Kohukohu.

== Political career ==
Hornblow stood for the New Zealand House of Representatives several times during his life. In the 1902 election, he stood in the Rangitikei electorate and of the five candidates, he came fourth. In the 1905 election, he stood in the Oroua electorate and of the three candidates, he came last. He once more contested the Oroua electorate in the subsequent election in 1908 and of the three candidates, he came last in the first ballot and was thus eliminated from the second round of voting. In the 1909 Rangitikei by-election, he came last of the five candidates in the first ballot. In the 1911 election, he stood in the Oroua electorate but was beaten by David Guthrie. In the 1914 election, he stood in the Rangitikei electorate but was beaten by Edward Newman. In the 1919 election, he stood in the Eden electorate and of the three candidates, he came last. In the 1922 election, he stood in the Kaipara electorate and was beaten by Gordon Coates. In the 1925 election, he stood in the Bay of Islands electorate and of the five candidates, he came last. He again stood in the Bay of Islands electorate in 1925 and of the three candidates, he came a distant last. In the 1935 election he stood for the Bay of Islands electorate again against Harold Rushworth as an Independent Labour candidate, placing third out of four candidates.

Hornblow was mayor of Dargaville from 1919 to 1925.

== Private life ==
On 21 February 1889 at Greytown, he married Emily Sarah Perry of Masterton. They had a son and a daughter, and divorced in December 1906. His first wife remarried in Nelson the following year.

Hornblow married Rose Lavinia Spain in March 1907 in Dunedin. There were no children from this marriage, they separated in December 1927 and were divorced in June 1931.
