= 1880 Rangitikei by-election =

New Zealand by-election

- 8 May 1880
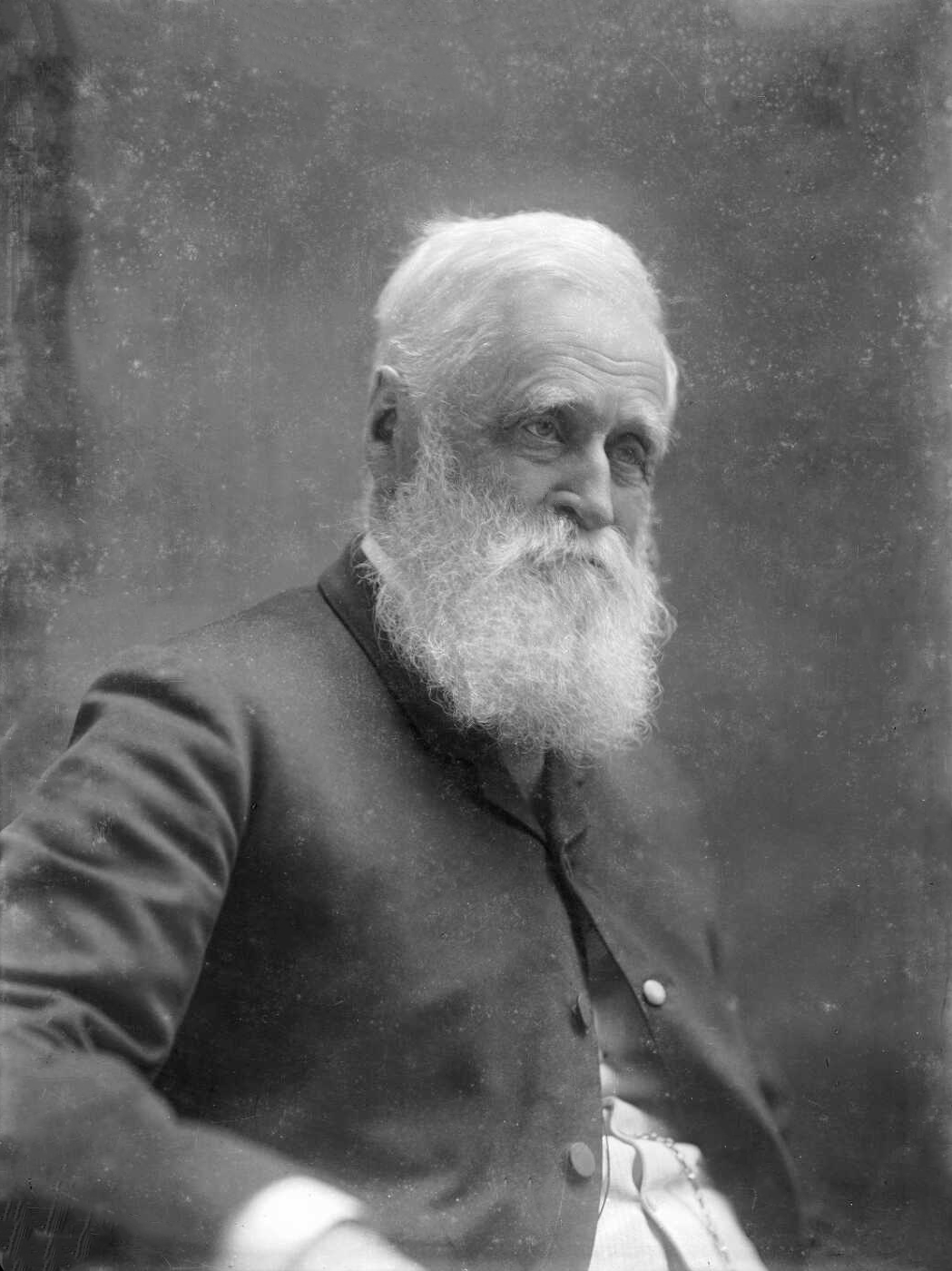
Candidate	William Fox	Donald Fraser
Party	Independent	Independent
Popular vote	233	123
Percentage	54.82	28.94
Member before election
William Willis
Independent
Elected Member
William Fox
Independent

The 1880 Rangitikei by-election was a by-election held during the 7th New Zealand Parliament in the Rangitikei electorate of the North Island. This was the fourth by-election since the Rangitikei electorate was established for the 1861 election. The previous by-election took place in 1875 and the following one took place in 1892. Sir William Fox, Premier of New Zealand on four occasions, was elected to Parliament for his sixth and final time.

== Background ==
Despite William Jarvis Willis' election to Parliament only one year earlier in the 1879 election, he resigned on 5 April 1880 due to poor health. A by-election was called for 8 May 1880 with former Premier of New Zealand William Fox, Marton politician Henry Lyon and Donald Fraser of Lower Rangitikei being the three candidates.

== Results ==
1880 Rangitikei by-election
Party	Candidate	Votes	%	±%
Independent	William Fox	233	54.82	
Independent	Donald Fraser	123	28.94	
Independent	Henry Lyon	69	16.24	
Majority		110	25.88	
Turnout		425		

Fox was elected to Parliament for a sixth and final term, serving as MP for Rangitikei until the 1881 general election. He was elected by a majority of 110 votes, or 25.88%, over runner-up Fraser.

Some electors in Turakina were unable to vote as the local polling station opened at 9:40 a.m. instead of the legally-mandated 9 a.m., leaving some electors with no opportunity to vote as they had to go back to their daily routines.

== See also ==
- List of New Zealand by-elections
- Rangitikei by-election (disambiguation), other by-elections for the Rangitikei electorate
