= Overton railway station, New Zealand =

Railway station in New Zealand

Overton railway station
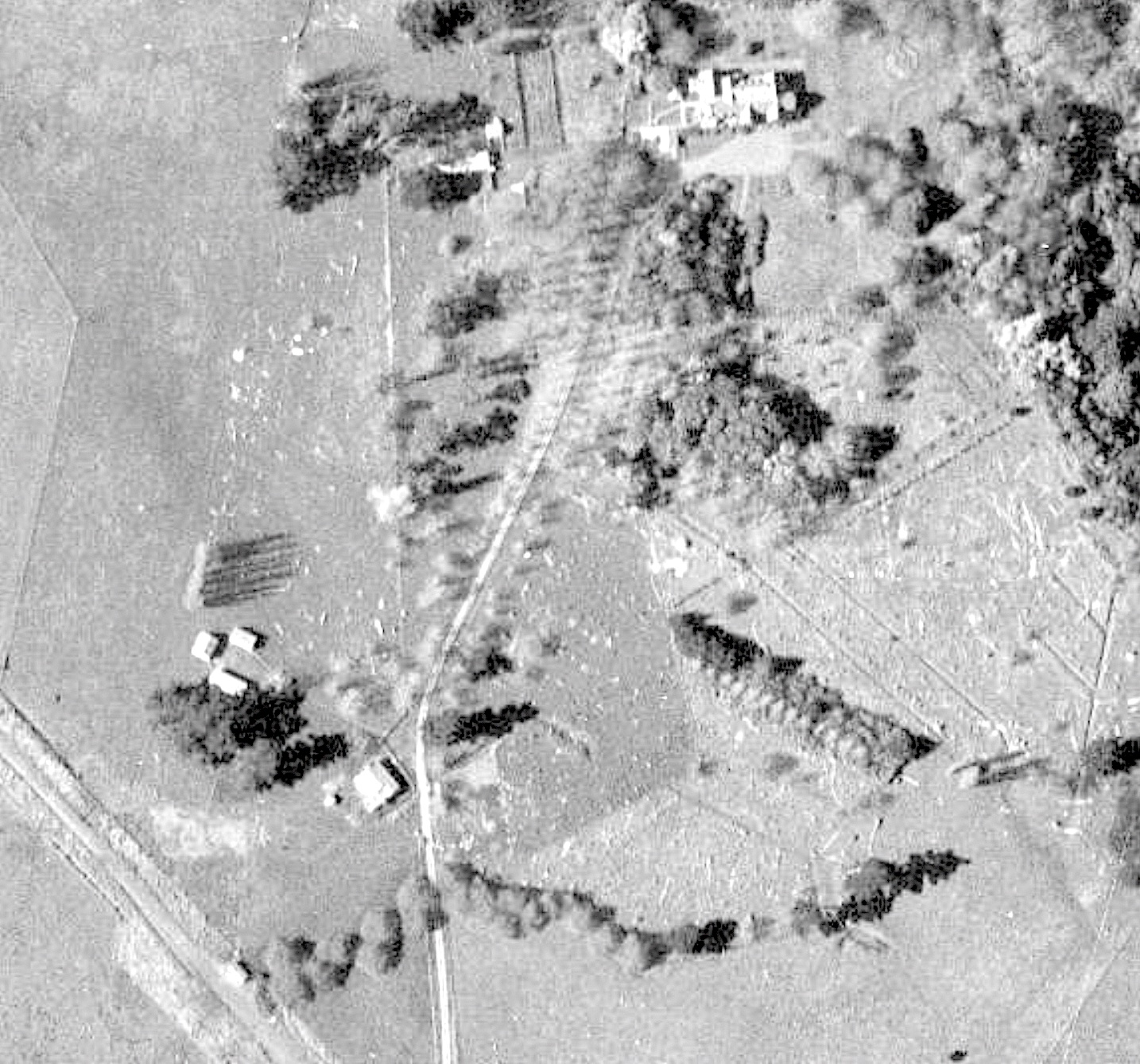
- Overton House and railway station in 1942

General information
- Location: New Zealand
- Coordinates: 40.039001°S 175.454322°E
- Elevation: 93 m (305 ft)
- Line: North Island Main Trunk
- Distance: Wellington 188.69 km (117.25 mi)

History
- Opened: 2 June 1888
- Closed: 10 August 1959
- Electrified: June 1988

Services
Preceding station	Historical railways	Following station
Porewa; Line open, station closed 1.84 km (1.14 mi)	North Island Main Trunk; KiwiRail	Cliff Road; Line open, station closed 5.11 km (3.18 mi)
Location

Overton railway station was a very small flag station on the North Island Main Trunk and in the Manawatū-Whanganui region of New Zealand.

It was 5 mi 28 ch (8.6 km) from Marton, opened on 2 June 1888 and closed on 10 August 1959.

== History ==
The route of the Hunterville branch (later incorporated into the NIMT) was inspected on foot in 1884 and officially opened on Saturday 2 June 1888, when the station was served by two trains a week. By 1894 the branch had two trains a day.

Overton was first noted on 1 May 1888 and a 1 August 1895 note considered the necessity for a flag station. It seems to have had only a plain line until 1897, when it had a passing loop for 6 wagons. In 1898 it had a platform and by 1904 also a shelter shed. The loop was removed in October 1953 and the station closed to all traffic on Monday, 10 August 1959.

=== Overton House ===
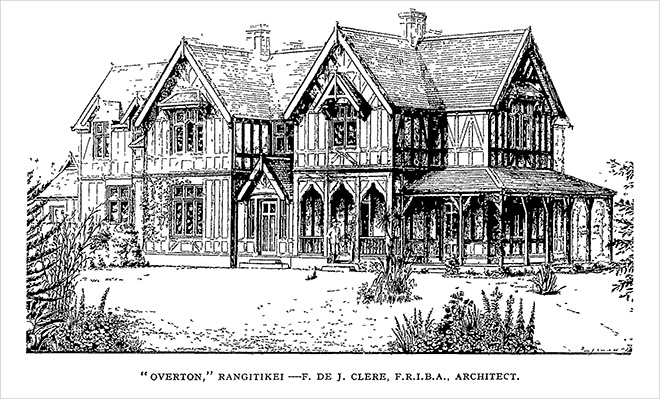
Overton House 1884

In June 1959 it was noted that the station was retained following negotiations with Mr N F Arkwright. Until 1926 the station was surrounded by the Overton estate. The estate was bought about 1882 by Francis Arkwright, who stood as a Member of Parliament for the seat of Rangitīkei, but was defeated in 1887 and 1890. He had a large Tudor revival house built in 1884. In 1990 the House was registered by Heritage New Zealand as a Category I heritage item, with registration number 187.
