= Porewa =

- Locality
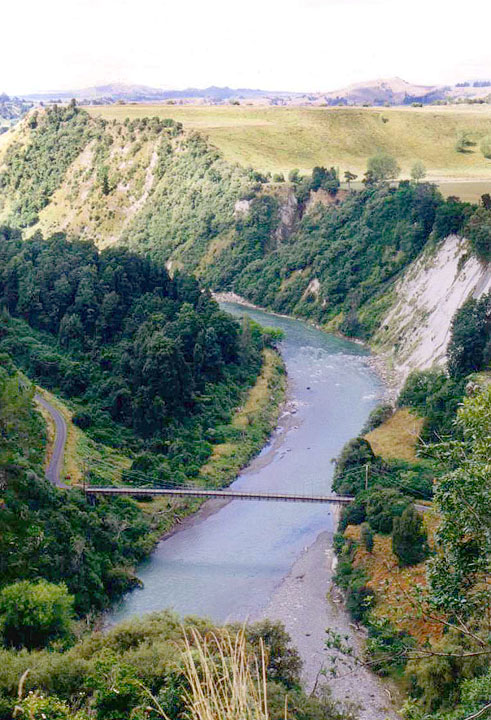
- The Rangitikei River running through Pohonui-Porewa

- Location within New Zealand
- Coordinates: 39°45′49.2116″S 175°33′17.5165″E
- Country: New Zealand
- Region: Manawatū-Whanganui
- Territorial authority: Rangitikei District

Government
  - Mayor: Andy Watson
  - MP: Ian McKelvie

Population (2013 census)
  - Total: 2,031

Porewa is a rural community, in the Rangitikei District of the Manawatū-Whanganui region of New Zealand's North Island.

It is the location of the former Porewa railway station. The station is 164 metres above sea level, 11 kilometres from Marton Railway Station.

== Geography ==
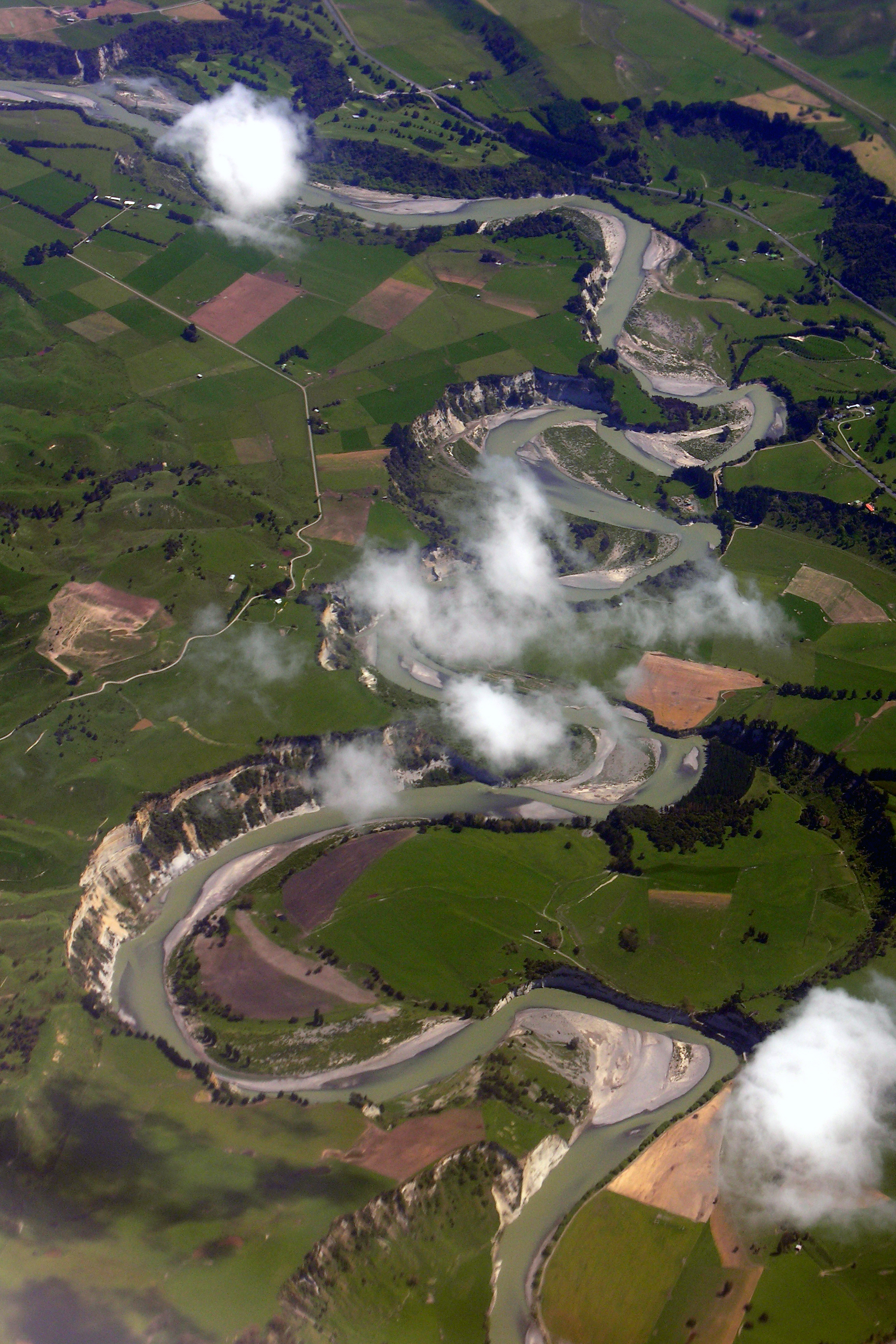
An aerial view of the Rangitikei River.

Several rivers run through the area, including the Rangitikei River, Moawhango River, the Mangawharariki River and the Kawhatau River.

The mostly rural area is sparsely populated.

Pohonui-Porewa had the following boundaries with other statistical areas: Moawhango to the north, Whanawhana (towards Hastings, Hawke's Bay) to the northeast, Tikokino (Central Hawke's Bay) to the east, Pohangina (Manawatū) to the southeast, Kiwitea (Manawatu) to the south, Tokorangi-Hiwinui (Manawatu) and Lake Alice to the southwest and Fordell-Kakatahi (Whanganui) to the west.

== History ==
Porewa was one of the first communities in the Rangitikei District to get a school.

A railway station was established in 1887.

By 1897, the rural settlement consisted of a small wooden schoolhouse, two homes, and a one-acre school playground. The school could accommodate 40 students, had a roll of 36, had average attendance of 27, and had a single teacher.

The Porewa railway station closed in 1982, and there is now a single track through the site.

In the 2013 census, the Pohonui-Porewa statistical area had a population of 2,031 inhabitants.

In the 2018 census the statistical area was largely divided between Mokai-Patea and Otairi.

== Government and politics ==
=== Local politics ===
As part of the Rangitikei District, the current Mayor of Rangitikei since 2013 is Andy Watson.

=== National government ===
Porewa, like the rest of the Rangitikei District, is located in the general electorate of Rangitīkei and in the Māori electorate of Te Tai Hauāuru. Rangitīkei is a safe National Party seat since the 1938 election with the exception of 1978–1984 when it was held by Bruce Beetham of the Social Credit Party. Since 2011 it has been held by Ian McKelvie.

Te Tai Hauāuru is a more unstable seat, having been held by three different parties since 1996, i.e. New Zealand First, the Māori Party and the Labour Party. Since 2014 it has been held by Adrian Rurawhe of the Labour Party.

== Education ==
Due to its sparse population, the area itself does not have any schools. However, there are several schools in Hunterville and Taihape, including Taihape Area School.

== Demographics ==
Historical population
Year	Pop.	±% p.a.
2001	2,157	—
2006	2,076	−0.76%
2013	2,031	−0.31%

Pohonui-Porewa had a population of 2,031 according to the 2013 New Zealand census. This is a decrease of 48, or 2.3 percent, since the 2006 census. There were 810 occupied dwellings, 153 unoccupied dwellings, and 3 dwellings under construction.

Of the residential population, 1,059 (52.1%) were male compared to 48.7% nationally, and 972 (47.9%) were female, compared to 51.3% nationally. The district had a median age of 41.1 years, 3.1 years above the national median age of 38.0 years. People aged 65 and over made up 12.6% of the population, compared to 14.3% nationally, and people under 15 years made up 21.7%, compared to 20.4% nationally.

The meshblock's ethnicity is made up of (national figures in brackets): 89.3% European (74.0%), 15.6% Māori (14.9%), 0.9% Asian (11.8%), 0.9% Pacific Islanders (7.4%), 0.0% Middle Eastern, Latin American or African (1.2%), and 2.9% Other (1.7%).

Pohonui-Porewa had an unemployment rate of 2.9% of people 15 years and over, compared to 7.4% nationally. The median annual income of all people 15 years and over was $30,800, compared to $28,500 nationally. Of those, 34.7% earned under $20,000, compared to 38.2% nationally, while 24.7% earned over $50,000, compared to 26.7% nationally.

== Transport ==
=== Roads ===
State Highway 1 goes through the central and eastern parts of the area, beginning just before Taihape in central northern Pohonui-Porewa and continuing down through Mangaweka and Hunterville as it leaves the area on towards Lake Alice. The North Island portion of this national state highway begins at Cape Reinga and ends at Wellington International Airport.

=== Public transport ===
InterCity runs several daily and non-daily services throughout the area. These routes include: Auckland–Wellington, Wellington–Auckland, Tauranga–Wellington and Wellington–Tauranga.

The area used to be serviced by the North Island Main Trunk (or Overlander), a railway line connecting Auckland and Wellington. However, in 2012 the Overlander was replaced by the Northern Explorer, which has fewer stops and does not stop in Pohonui-Porewa.

The nearest airports to the town are Whanganui Airport, located 62 km west of Hunterville, and Palmerston North Airport, located 64 km south from Hunterville. Both airports are domestic only.

== See also ==
- Rangitikei District
