= Cliff Road railway station =

Railway station in New Zealand

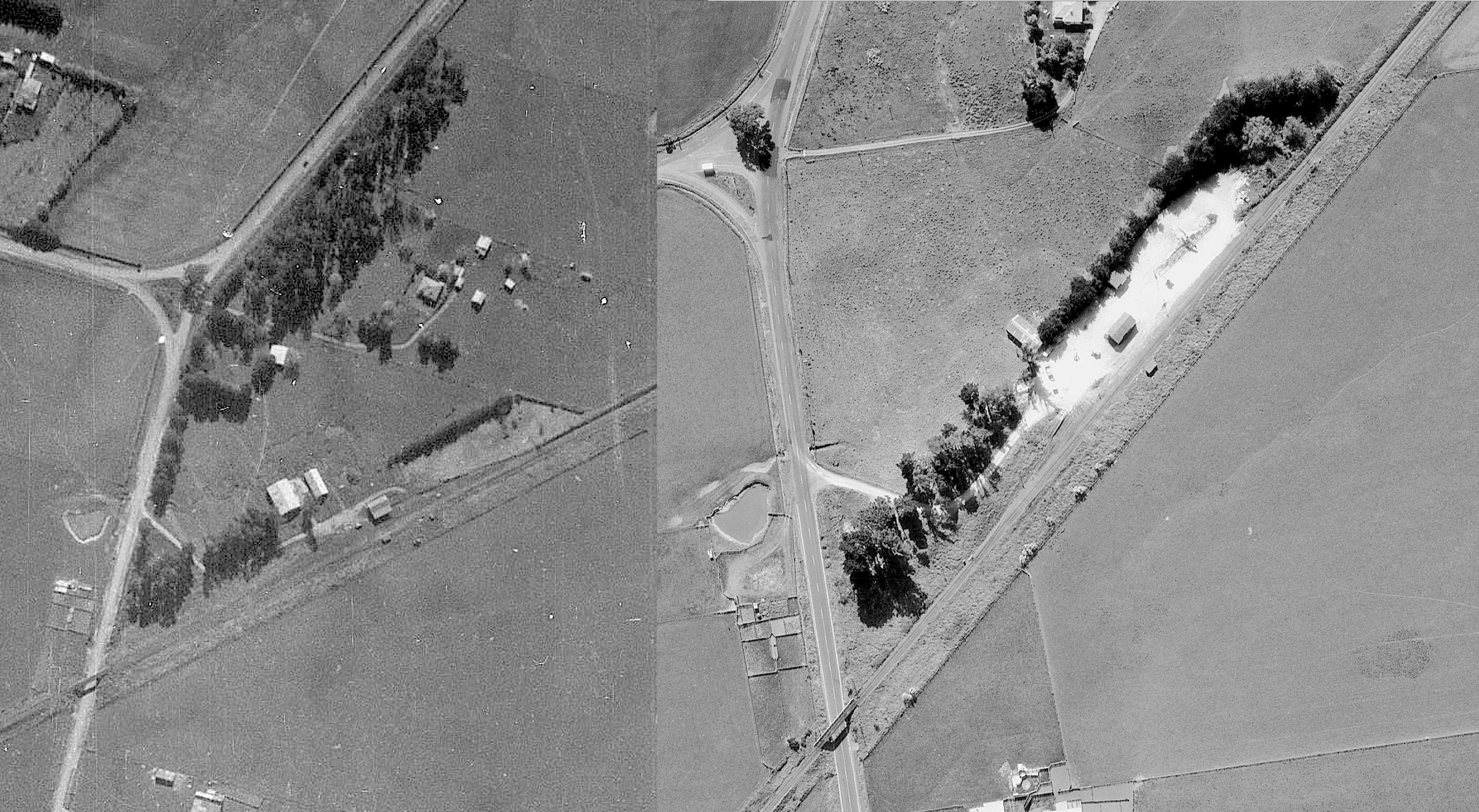
- Cliff Rd railway station - left 1942, right 1971

General information
- Location: New Zealand
- Coordinates: 40.072212°S 175.418226°E
- Elevation: 94 m (308 ft)
- Line: North Island Main Trunk
- Distance: Wellington 183.58 km (114.07 mi)

History
- Opened: 2 June 1888
- Closed: passengers by 10 August 1959 goods 25 April 1982
- Electrified: June 1988

Services
Preceding station	Historical railways	Following station
Overton; Line open, station closed 5.11 km (3.18 mi)	North Island Main Trunk; KiwiRail	Marton; Line open, station closed 3.33 km (2.07 mi)
Location

Cliff Road railway station was a flag station on the North Island Main Trunk in New Zealand. It opened in 1888 and closed in 1982. Only a single track now passes through the station site and no buildings remain.

== History ==
The route of the Hunterville branch (later incorporated into the NIMT) was inspected on foot in 1884. A station at Cliff Road was planned from 1885, when authority was requested for £50.9/- for alterations to the station, though the station doesn't seem to have existed until 1888. A report said goods were first carried on the branch on 19 October 1887, though the line was said to be almost ready to open in December 1887 and an estimate of May 1888 opening was given, but the official opening of the 15 mi 57 ch (25.3 km) Marton to Hunterville section was on Saturday 2 June 1888, when the station was served by two trains a week, reported as losing £15 a week. A Certificate of Inspection for the line was issued on Wednesday, 6 June 1888. By 1894 the branch had two trains a day.

In 1890 special trains ran to Cliff Road for Marton hack races.

Although an application for cattle yards was made in 1893, it seems none was provided, though sheep were handled at the station.

By 1896 there was a shelter shed, platform, loading bank, urinals and a passing loop for 24 wagons. By 1899 a cart approach existed. An 1897 petition asked for a goods shed. In 1904 it was decided to move a spare engine shed from Wanganui District and convert it to a goods shed for about £75. By November 1904 Cliff Road had a 40 ft (12 m) by 20 ft (6.1 m) goods shed. In 1913, to ease dray access to the siding, £70 was spent to shift loading back to the north end of the yard and extend the approach road.

The station had a caretaker from at least 1912 to 1951. Houses were built for railway workers in 1919 and 1920.

In 1939 the loop siding at Cliff Road was lifted for use at Whangamōmona. Seven wagons were derailed at the station in 1942.

A report on 19 June 1959 said there was still a shelter shed, platform, a tablet locked loop siding, goods shed, loading bank and sheep yards. Traffic was then mostly inward loads of bulk lime, manure and occasional livestock and, outwards, potatoes and straw. On Monday, 10 August 1959 the station closed for passengers, parcels, and goods in small lots. By 1971 the goods shed was rarely used. From 1 September 1972 until 1 October 1978 the shed was leased to Marton Lime Company. From Sunday, 25 April 1982 the station closed to all traffic.

== Bridge strikes ==
The level crossing, on what is now State Highway 1, was the subject of a court case about a car collision with a train as early as 1913. The defendant S. J. Gibbons was awarded the amount of £15 as claimed in a precedent-setting case. Trees were felled in 1916 to improve sight-lines for motorists.

The crossing was replaced by a bridge under the railway in about 1938. In 2007 a truck hit the bridge and its debris was hit by another truck, which caught fire. Sleepers on the bridge burnt and had to be replaced. Another truck hit the bridge in 2017 and overturned.
