= James Douglas (plumber) =

New Zealand plumber and politician (1872–1957)

James Douglas JP
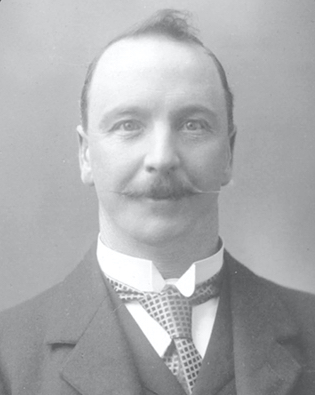
- Douglas in 1917

42nd Mayor of Dunedin
- In office 1921–1923
- Preceded by: William Begg
- Succeeded by: Harold Tapley

Personal details
- Born: 16 April 1872 Dunedin, New Zealand
- Died: 2 August 1957 (aged 85) Dunedin, New Zealand
- Spouse: Catherine Mackie (m. 1900)
- Children: 7
- Occupation: Master plumber

James Sandilands Douglas JP (16 April 1872 – 2 August 1957) was a New Zealand plumber and politician. He served as mayor of Dunedin from 1921 to 1923.

== Early life and family ==
Douglas was born in Dunedin on 16 April 1872. His father, also called James Sandilands Douglas, was the publican of Wain's Hotel in Dunedin, and his mother was Agnes Fortune Douglas (née McFadyen), whose father Hugh McFadyen was the first town clerk of North East Valley Borough.

On 18 April 1900, Douglas married Catherine Mackie at the Leith Street Congregational Church in Dunedin. The couple went on to have seven children.

Douglas' brother, Robert Rutherford Douglas, unsuccessfully contested the Dunedin South electorate for the Independent Political Labour League at the 1908 general election, finishing second behind the Liberal candidate, Thomas Sidey. At the 1911 general election, he stood as an independent candidate for Dunedin North, but again placed second, being defeated by George Thomson.

== Plumbing career ==
After leaving school, Douglas was apprenticed to the plumbing trade in 1888, and in 1895 he became a partner in a plumbing firm with James Wilson when the pair acquired the business from their retiring boss. In 1902, Douglas took over the plumbing business of Messrs Croxford and Sons, and ran it as J. S. Douglas and Company until his retirement from the trade in 1932.

Douglas was a founding member of the Otago Master Plumbers' Association serving as secretary from 1895 to 1898, and then as president from 1899, retiring in 1933. He served as president of the Federation of New Zealand Master Plumbers on three occasions, and was a member of the Plumbers' Registration Board from 1914 until 1946, having advocated for the registration of plumbers in New Zealand.

== Local politics ==
Douglas was active in local politics in Dunedin over a long period. He was first elected to the Dunedin Drainage Board in 1912, and served for 19 years, including as chairman on three occasions. In 1914, he was elected as a member of the Dunedin City Council in 1914, and remained a city councillor until 1930. In 1921, Douglas was elected unopposed as mayor of Dunedin, and did not seek re-election in 1923.

At the 1935 local-body elections, Douglas withdrew from the election for the Dunedin City Council before polling day, and in 1938, he finished 25th out of 28 candidates and was not elected to council.

Douglas served as a member of the Otago Harbour Board for 12 years, and was, for 14 years, a member of the Ocean Beach Domain Board. He also served on the University of Otago Council, the boards governors of King Edward Technical College and the Otago High Schools, and the Dunedin Licensing Committee. He chaired the provisional committee that launched the New Zealand and South Seas International Exhibition, which was held in Dunedin in 1925–1926.

== Other activities ==
In 1891, Douglas joined the Dunedin City Guards as a private; he rose through the ranks, being commissioned as a lieutenant in 1899, and was promoted to captain in 1906. Following the establishment of the territorial system, he was appointed major and second-in-command of the Otago Infantry, 4th Regiment. After 30 years of continuous volunteer service, he was posted to the reserve and retired list. A fine shot, Douglas won several prizes in shooting competitions, and in 1898 he won the marksman's badge.

Douglas was active as a Freemason; he was connected with Lodge Maori No. 105, New Zealand Constitution, serving a term as worshipful master from 1908. He was also a member of the Ancient Order of Foresters from 1897.

Douglas was a deacon of the United Congregational Church, served as treasurer of the Leith Street and United Congregational Churches for over 40 years, and was appointed a justice of the peace in 1916.

== Death and legacy ==
Douglas died in Dunedin on 2 August 1957, and was buried at Andersons Bay Cemetery. His wife, Katie, died in 1959.

Since 1948, the New Zealand Master Plumbers' Federation has awarded the James Douglas Medallion to the leading newly qualified apprentice in New Zealand.

Political offices
| Preceded by William Begg | Mayor of Dunedin; 1921–1923 | Succeeded by Harold Tapley |
