= Porewa railway station =

Railway station in New Zealand

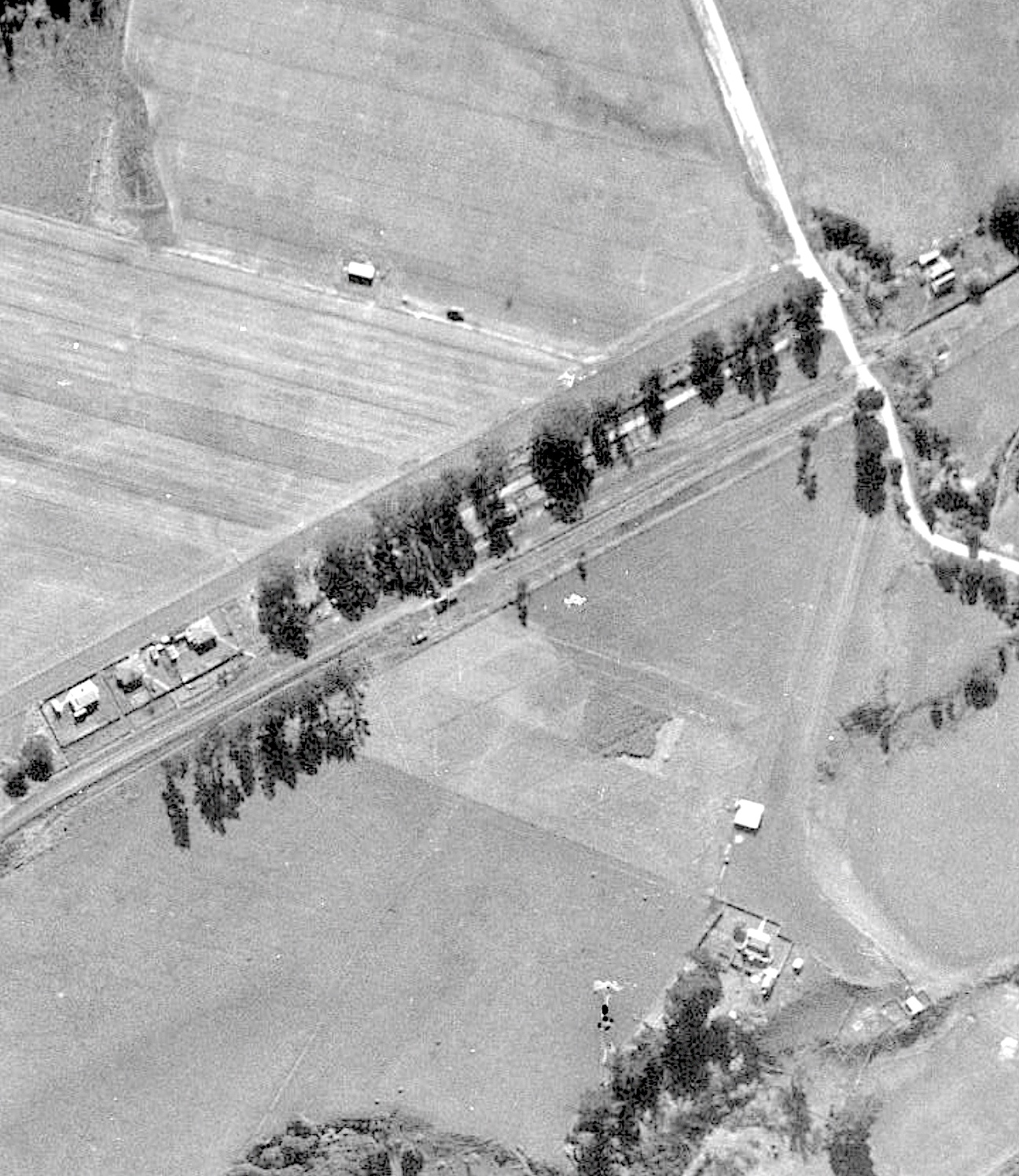
- Porewa railway station in 1942

General information
- Location: New Zealand
- Coordinates: 40.0262°S 175.4714°E
- Elevation: 165 m (541 ft)
- Line: North Island Main Trunk
- Distance: Wellington 190.53 km (118.39 mi)

History
- Opened: 19 October 1887
- Closed: passenger before December 1975 goods 25 April 1982
- Electrified: June 1988

Services
| Preceding station | Historical railways | Following station |
|---|---|---|
| Rata; Line open, station closed 4.93 km (3.06 mi) | North Island Main Trunk; KiwiRail | Overton; Line open, station closed 1.84 km (1.14 mi) |
Location

Porewa railway station was a station on the North Island Main Trunk in New Zealand located in Pohonui-Porewa, on the Hunterville Branch (later incorporated into the NIMT), 6 mi 42 ch (10.5 km) from Marton. The station was in use from 1887 to 1982, but now has only a single track through the site.

== History ==
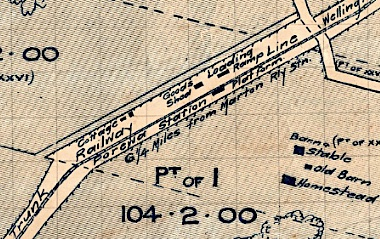
Porewa railway station plan 1915 showing the goods shed location

The line was inspected in 1884. The official opening of the 15 mi 57 ch (25.3 km) Marton to Hunterville section was on Saturday 2 June 1888, when the station was served by two trains a week. A Certificate of Inspection for the line was issued on Wednesday, 6 June 1888. By 1894 the branch had two trains a day.

Gifford & O'Connor built the station in 1887, its final certificate being given on 6 January 1888. By 1896 Porewa had a shelter shed, platform, cart approach, loading bank, urinals and a passing loop for 27 wagons, extended to 76 by 1980. Sheep yards were added by 1898 and a 30 ft (9.1 m) by 20 ft (6.1 m) goods shed by 1904, though there is a note about J W Marshall erecting a goods shed in 1888. Cattle yards were added in 1888. After flooding, it was recommended in 1897 that the ganger's house be moved to higher ground. In 1978 the railway housing was given up. A tablet porter started in 1912, who could help with goods traffic. The sidings were improved in 1914. Electric lighting came in 1939. In 1980 only a loading bank was noted. On Sunday, 25 April 1982 Porewa closed to all traffic.

== New passing loop ==
From 14 December 1983 a new crossing loop replaced those at Rata and Porewa, 1.89 km (1.17 mi) to the east of Porewa. Porewa is the official name, for the new crossing loop. The correct name for the nearby Porewa Stream is Pourewa. There is a shelter at the new loop. The realignment of State Highway 1 alongside the railway occurred between the map editions of 1986 and 2009.
