= 1911 New Zealand general election =

- 7 to 19 December 1911

All 80 seats in the New Zealand House of Representatives 41 seats were needed for a majority
- Turnout: 83.5%
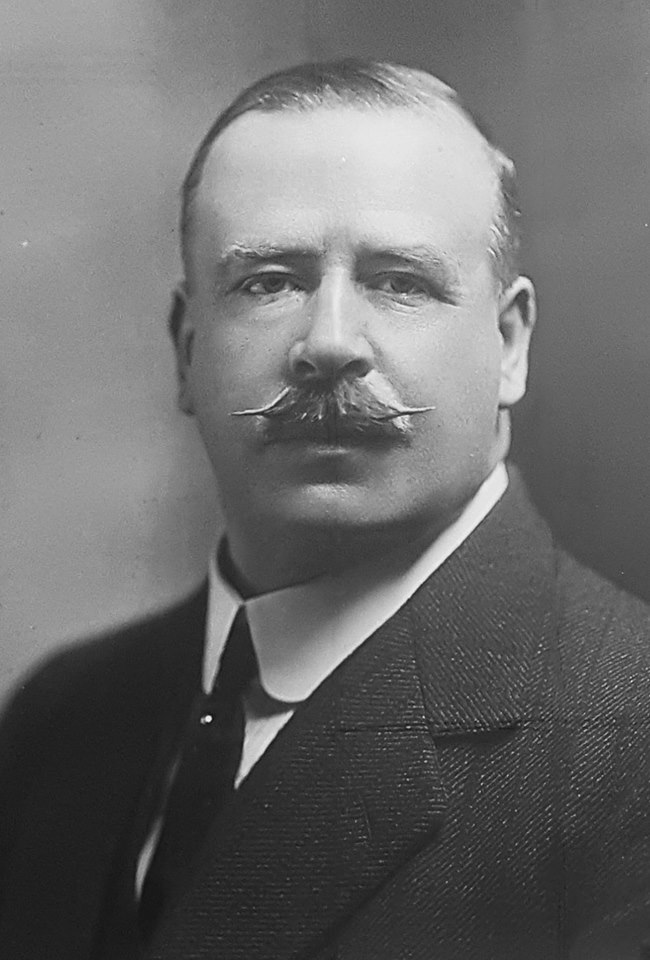

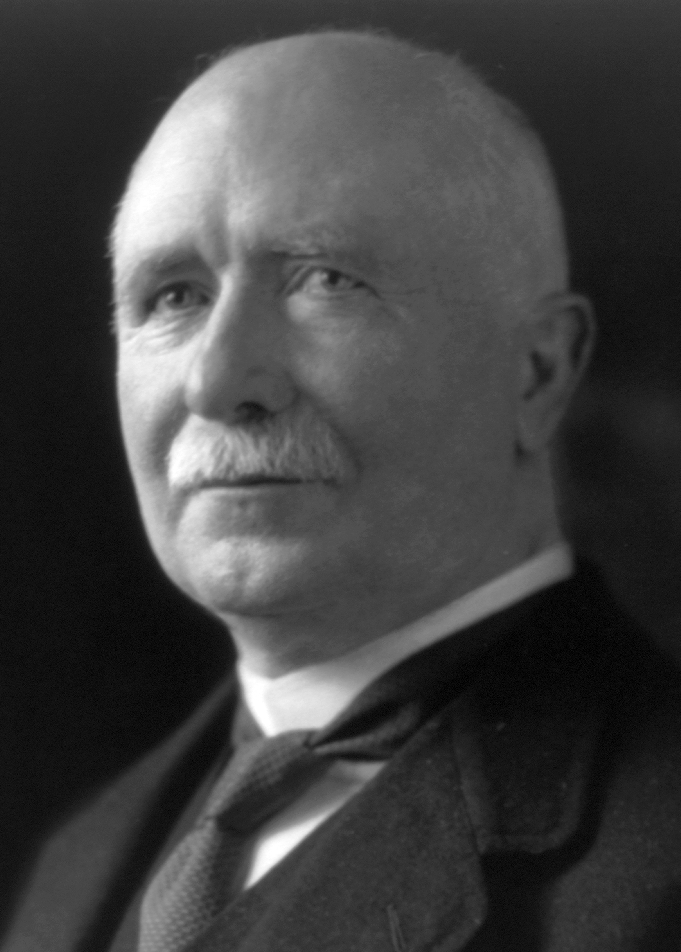

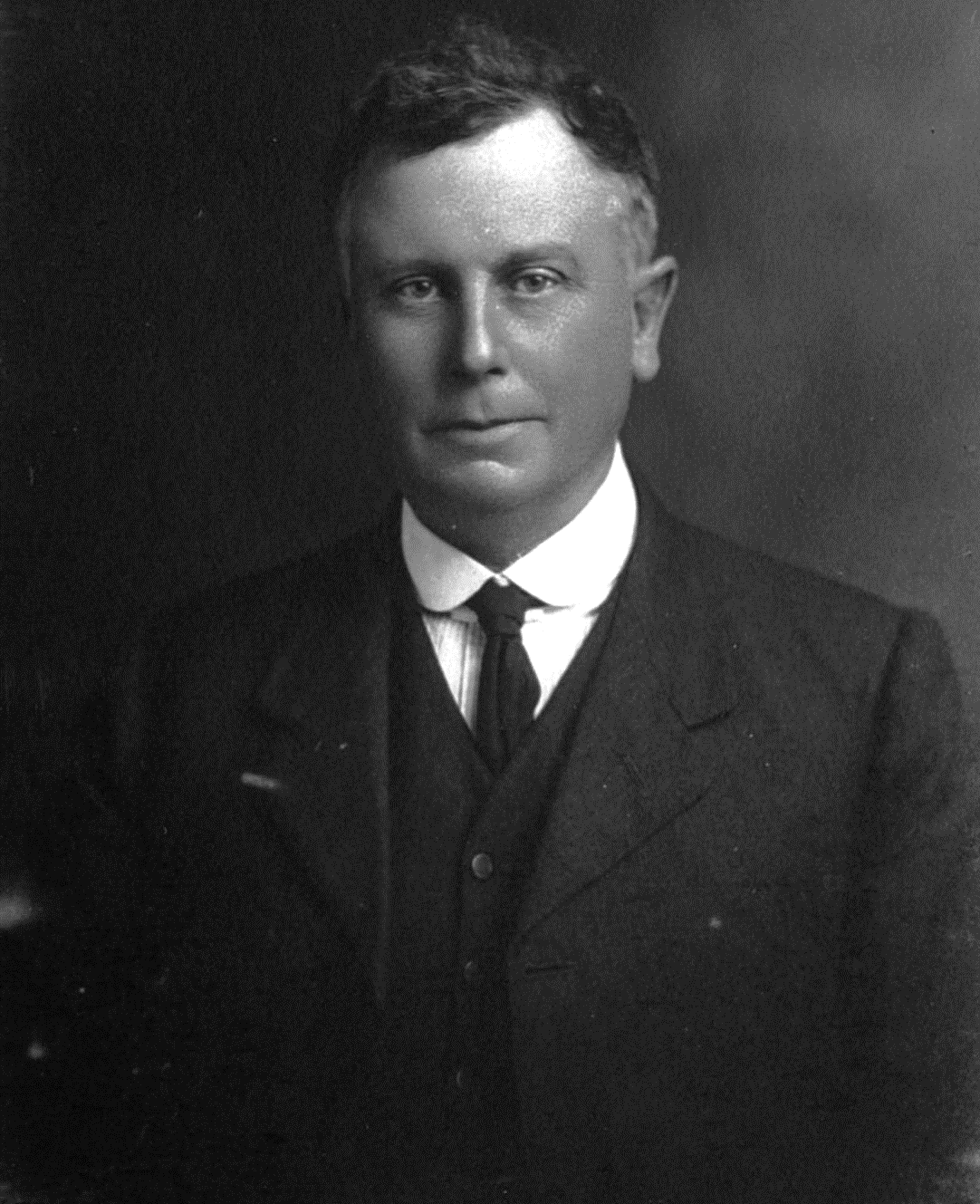
	First party	Second party	Third party
Leader	Joseph Ward	William Massey	Alfred Hindmarsh
Party	Liberal	Reform	Labour
Leader since	6 August 1906	11 February 1909	July 1910
Leader's seat	Awarua	Franklin	Wellington South
Last election	50 seats	New	1 seat
Seats won	33	37	4
Seat change	▼17	▲37	▲3
Popular vote	163,401	161,773	35,869
Percentage	34.23%	33.37%	7.51%
Swing	▼14.4%	▲33.37%	▲2.62%
- Results of the election.
Prime Minister before election
Joseph Ward
Liberal
Subsequent Prime Minister
Joseph Ward
Liberal

The 1911 New Zealand general election was held on Thursday, 7 and 14 December in the general electorates, and on Tuesday, 19 December in the Māori electorates to elect a total of 80 MPs to the 18th session of the New Zealand Parliament. A total number of 590,042 (83.5%) voters turned out to vote. In two seats (Eastern Maori and Gisborne) there was only one candidate (not one seat, as in Wilson).

== Outcome ==
The result was that the Liberal Party, which had won a majority of seats (50 of 80) in Parliament, lost 17 seats and its majority, winning only 33. The Reform Party gained 9 to obtain a plurality (37) of seats. Liberal Prime Minister Joseph Ward was able to retain office, but in 1912, Reform Party founder William Massey formed a new government.

Joseph Ward hoped to remain in power with the support of independents and Labour Party members. Several candidates before the election made commitments to support the Ward Government in the event of a no-confidence motion in the House of Representatives. Ward considered delaying a new session of the house, perhaps for six months until June 1912, but following some tough talking from the Governor-General Lord Islington, he set the date as 15 February. To speed up the negotiating process, Ward promised to resign as Prime Minister after the Reform Party's no-confidence motion was defeated. The end result was even at 39 all, with the Speaker casting the deciding vote in favour of the Ward Government. Joseph Ward then resigned as Prime Minister on 28 March 1912. He was succeeded by Thomas Mackenzie and his new Cabinet was sworn in. The Mackenzie Government lasted only two months and was defeated by a no-confidence motion, 41 votes to 33 on 5 July 1912.

The Second Ballot Act 1908 provided for second or runoff ballots between the top two candidates where the top candidate did not get an absolute majority. The second ballot was held seven days after the first ballot except in ten large rural seats, where fourteen days were allowed. At the 1911 election, all 30 second ballots were held seven days later. Two 1913 by-elections (Grey and Lyttelton) also required second ballots.

The Second Ballot Act did not apply to the Maori electorates, and was used only in 1908 and 1911, as it was repealed in 1913.

In 1911 were the first triennial national referendum on prohibition of alcohol. Referendums were subsequently held in conjunction with each general election (except for 1931 and 1951) until they were abolished in 1989.

== Results ==
=== Party totals ===
Election results
Party	Candidates	Total votes	Percentage	Seats won
Reform	64	159,309	33.37	37
Liberal	89	163,401	34.23	33
Labour	20	35,869	7.51	4
Socialist	8	9,091	1.90	0
Independent	59	109,666	22.97	6
	240	477,336		80

=== Votes summary ===
Popular Vote
Liberal	34.23%
Reform	33.37%
Labour	7.51%
Socialist	1.90%
Independents	22.97%

Parliament seats
Reform	46.25%
Liberal	41.25%
Labour	5.00%
Independents	7.50%

=== Electorate results ===
The following are the results of the 1911 general election:

Key

Reform	Liberal	Labour	Independent Liberal	Independent Labour
Socialist	Liberal–Labour	Independent	Affiliation unknown

Electorate results for the 1911 New Zealand general election
Electorate	Incumbent	Winner	Majority	Runner up
General electorates (Note: † in Majority column depicts electorates in which a second ballot was held.)
Ashburton	William Nosworthy		913†	John Kennedy
Auckland Central	Albert Glover		2,261	Michael Joseph Savage
Auckland East	Arthur Myers		1,993	Arthur Withy
Auckland West	Charles Poole	James Bradney	1,577	Charles Poole
Avon	George Russell		271†	James McCombs
Awarua	Joseph Ward		628	John Hamilton
Bay of Islands	Vernon Reed		183	George Wilkinson
Bay of Plenty	William MacDonald		535	Harry De Lautour
Bruce	James Allen		675	Parker McKinlay
Buller	James Colvin		150	Fergus Ferguson Munro
Chalmers	Edward Henry Clark		326†	John Thomas Johnson
Christchurch East	Thomas Davey		1181†	Henry Thacker
Christchurch North	Leonard Isitt		749†	Dryden Hall
Christchurch South	Harry Ell		631	Gains Whiting
Clutha	Alexander Malcolm		375	George Livingstone
Dunedin Central	James Arnold	Charles Statham	1544	James Arnold
Dunedin North	George Thomson		759†	Robert Douglas
Dunedin South	Thomas Sidey		745	John McManus
Dunedin West	John A. Millar		639†	Harry Bedford
Eden	John Bollard		663	William Speight
Egmont	Bradshaw Dive	Thomas Mackenzie	327	Bradshaw Dive
Ellesmere	Heaton Rhodes		1581	George Armstrong
Franklin	William Massey		1963	John McLarin
Gisborne	James Carroll		Uncontested	
Grey	Arthur Guinness		1138	Paddy Webb
Grey Lynn	George Fowlds	John Payne	38†	George Fowlds
Hawke's Bay	Alfred Dillon	Hugh Campbell	1107†	Horace Simson
Hurunui	George Forbes		939	David Macfarlane
Hutt	Thomas Wilford		1931	Michael Reardon
Invercargill	Josiah Hanan		667†	Thomas Fleming
Kaiapoi	David Buddo		209†	Richard Moore
Kaipara	John Stallworthy	Gordon Coates	572†	John Stallworthy
Lyttelton	George Laurenson		2079	Colin Cook
Manukau	Frederic Lang		2307	Ralph Stewart
Marsden	Francis Mander		544	Edmund Purdie
Masterton	Alexander Hogg	George Sykes	581†	Alexander Hogg
Mataura	George Anderson		857	John MacGibbon
Motueka	Roderick McKenzie		1104	Frederick Smith
Napier	Vigor Brown		1064	Henry Hill
Nelson	John Graham	Harry Atmore	1516†	Walter Moffatt
Oamaru	Tom Duncan	Ernest Lee	1364	Tom Duncan
Ohinemuri	Hugh Poland		1207†	Pat Hickey
Oroua	David Guthrie		1092	Robert Hornblow
Otago Central	New electorate	Robert Scott	1810	William Mason
Otaki	William Hughes Field	John Robertson	21†	William Hughes Field
Pahiatua	Bob Ross	James Escott	573†	Bob Ross
Palmerston	David Buick		832	Robert McNab
Parnell	Frank Lawry	James Samuel Dickson	438†	John Findlay
Patea	George Pearce		960	Patrick O'Dea
Raglan	New electorate	Richard Bollard	919†	Allen Bell
Rangitikei	Robbie Smith	Edward Newman	1028	William Meldrum
Riccarton	George Witty		1373†	Charles Ensor
Selwyn	Charles Hardy	William Dickie	271	Charles Hardy
Stratford	John Hine		730	Joseph McCluggage
Taranaki	Henry Okey		754	Charles Bellringer
Taumarunui	Bill Jennings	Charles Wilson	125	Bill Jennings
Tauranga	William Herries		1941	Robert King
Temuka	New electorate	Thomas Buxton	1372	William Jeffries
Thames	Edmund Taylor	Thomas William Rhodes	66	Edmund Taylor
Timaru	James Craigie		1226	Joseph Moore
Waikato	Henry Greenslade	Alexander Young	1128	Henry Greenslade
Waimarino	New electorate	Robbie Smith	480†	Frank Hockly
Waipawa	Charles Hall	George Hunter	569	Albert Jull
Wairarapa	Wally Buchanan		125	J. T. Marryat Hornsby
Wairau	John Duncan	Richard McCallum	142†	John Duncan
Waitaki	William Steward	Francis Henry Smith	84†	Jack MacPherson
Waitemata	Leonard Phillips	James Samuel Dickson	407†	William Joseph Napier
Wakatipu	William Fraser		91	James Horn
Wallace	John Charles Thomson		1962	Alan Carmichael
Wanganui	James Thomas Hogan	Bill Veitch	1156†	James Thomas Hogan
Wellington East	David McLaren	Alfred Newman	65†	David McLaren
Wellington Central	Francis Fisher		131†	Robert Fletcher
Wellington North	Alexander Herdman		1807	Arnold Woolford Izard
Wellington South	Robert Wright	Alfred Hindmarsh	254†	Robert Wright
Wellington Suburbs and Country	John Luke	William Henry Dillon Bell	399	Frank Moore
Westland	Tom Seddon		271	Henry Michel
Māori electorates (Note: The affiliation of many of the Maori candidates is unknown or uncertain; note that the Second Ballot Act 1908 did not apply to Maori constituencies.)
Eastern Maori	Āpirana Ngata		Uncontested	
Northern Maori	Te Rangi Hīroa		405	Riapo Timoti Puhipi
Southern Maori	Tame Parata	Taare Parata	31	Hopere Uru
Western Maori	Henare Kaihau	Māui Pōmare	565	Henare Kaihau

Table footnotes:

== Summary of changes ==
A boundary redistribution resulted in the abolition of four electorates:

- Geraldine, held by Thomas Buxton
- Manawatu, held by Edward Newman
- Taieri, held by Thomas Mackenzie
- Tuapeka, held by Robert Scott
- Wellington Suburbs, held by John Luke

At the same time, four new electorates came into being:

- Otago Central, first formed through the 1911 electoral redistribution
- Raglan, previously abolished in 1870
- Temuka, first formed through the 1911 electoral redistribution
- Waimarino, first formed through the 1911 electoral redistribution
- Wellington Suburbs and Country, first formed through the 1911 electoral redistribution
