= William Meldrum (general) =

New Zealand lawyer and military leader (1865–1964)

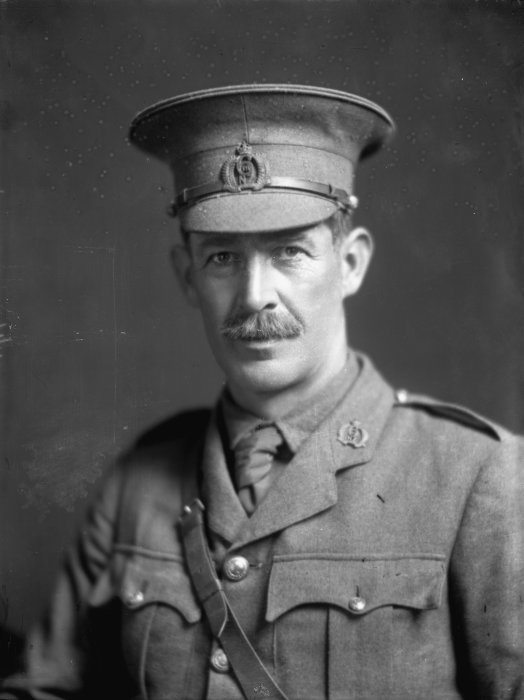
- Born: 28 July 1865; Kamo, Whangārei, New Zealand
- Died: 13 February 1964 (aged 98); Burnham, New Zealand
- Military career
- Allegiance: New Zealand
- Branch: New Zealand Military Forces
- Service years: 1900–1920
- Rank: Brigadier General
- Nickname: "Fix-Bayonets Bill"
- Commands: New Zealand Mounted Rifles Brigade (1917–19); Wellington Mounted Rifles Regiment (1914–17); 6th (Manawatu) Mounted Rifles (1914)
- Conflicts: First World War; Gallipoli campaign; Battle of Chunuk Bair; Sinai and Palestine campaign; Battle of Rafa; First Battle of Gaza; Second Battle of Gaza; Battle of Beersheba; Battle of Ayun Kara; Raid on Amman
- Awards: Companion of the Order of the Bath; Companion of the Order of St Michael and St George; Distinguished Service Order; Mentioned in Despatches (4); Colonial Auxiliary Forces Officers' Decoration; Order of the White Eagle (Serbia)

Brigadier General William Meldrum CB, CMG, DSO, VD (28 July 1865 – 13 February 1964) was a New Zealand lawyer, farmer, military leader, magistrate and local politician.

Born in the Northland region of New Zealand in 1865, Meldrum studied law after completing his schooling. A talented sportsman, he played representative rugby and cricket for Auckland. He was a barrister and solicitor practicing in Auckland initially before moving south to the Rangitikei District. He continued to work in the legal profession but also took up farming and was involved in local body politics. He was also prominent in the local militia, establishing a unit of mounted rifle volunteers. During the First World War, he volunteered for service with the New Zealand Expeditionary Force and commanded the Wellington Mounted Rifles Regiment during the Gallipoli campaign and the Sinai and Palestine Campaign. By late 1917, he was a brigadier-general and commander of the New Zealand Mounted Rifles Brigade. Returning to New Zealand after the war, he resumed practicing law. He later moved to Greymouth where he became the local magistrate and also served as the town's mayor. He died at Burnham Camp in 1964 at age of 98.

== Early life ==
Born in the Whangārei suburb of Kamo in New Zealand, Meldrum was the son of a farmer and his wife. As well as attending Kamo School, he was educated in Scotland. After completing his schooling at Auckland College and Grammar School, he studied law at Auckland University College. He participated in sports, representing Auckland in rugby in 1886 and also in four first-class cricket matches between 1884 and 1887. He played chess to a high standard and would be the New Zealand Chess Champion in 1896.

After completing his legal studies, Meldrum worked at the prominent law firm Whitaker and Russell and eventually became a barrister and solicitor in 1889. Two years later he moved to Hunterville, a town in the Rangitikei District and had a legal practice there for several years. On 24 April 1894, he married Nora Carthew of Te Henui at Taranaki Cathedral. She was the daughter of the late Edward Carthew, a barrister. They were to have one son and one daughter. Their son, Alexander Francis Meldrum, was a Rhodes Scholar in law in 1917.

Meldrum was prominent in local affairs, being on the Hunterville Town Board for a period and he was an unsuccessful candidate in the 1909 Rangitikei by-election, where he came third in the first ballot. In 1912, he sold his practice and from the profits bought land in the area which he farmed together with his wife, Nora, who he had married in 1894. The couple had two children.

== First World War ==
On the outbreak of the First World War, Meldrum volunteered for the New Zealand Expeditionary Force (NZEF) being raised for service overseas. He had extensive military service; he had formed a militia unit, the Hunterville Mounted Rifle Volunteers, in 1900 and by 1914 had risen to command of 6th (Manawatu) Mounted Rifles Regiment, with the rank of lieutenant colonel in the New Zealand Territorial Force. He would eventually be awarded the Colonial Auxiliary Forces Officers' Decoration for his lengthy service in the Territorial Force.

In the NZEF, Meldrum was appointed commander of the Wellington Mounted Rifles Regiment (WMR), which included three squadrons of mounted infantry from the three mounted regiments of the central North Island. After departing for the Middle East, Meldrum oversaw the training of his command until it was called upon for service in the Gallipoli campaign as part of the New Zealand Mounted Rifles Brigade, landing at ANZAC Cove on 12 May 1915. His men soon gave him the nickname 'Fix-Bayonets Bill' but despite this he demonstrated awareness of the value of the lives under his command. He refused orders to mount a frontal attack on Turkish machine guns on one occasion and sought a retreat from vulnerable positions on another.

A competent commander, Meldrum's WMR played an important role in the Battle of Chunuk Bair, when it captured Destroyer Hill and Table Top features, on the approaches to Chunuk Bair, in the evening of 6 August 1915. It then reinforced the defenders of Chunuk Bair in the evening of 8 August. Later that day Meldrum had to take overall command of the defending forces when the senior officer present was wounded. The WMR was relieved the next day, with 100 out of 183 men killed or wounded. Towards the end of the campaign, he was called up to take over command of the New Zealand Mounted Rifles Brigade. He was later recognised for his leadership during the battle with an appointment as a Companion of the Order of St Michael and St George and by the end of the campaign in Gallipoli had twice been mentioned in despatches.

After the evacuation from Gallipoli, and following a period of recuperation in Egypt, the New Zealand Mounted Rifles Brigade, with Meldrum having reverted to command of the WMR, was made part of the ANZAC Mounted Division. While the rest of the NZEF went to Europe for service on the Western Front, the ANZAC Mounted Division remained in the Middle East and served in the Sinai and Palestine Campaign, part of the efforts involved in protecting the Suez Canal from Turkish attacks. At one stage in 1916, Meldrum was called up to temporarily lead the Australian 2nd Light Horse Brigade when its original commanding officer was wounded. Later that year, the WMR was heavily involved in the Battle of Rafa. In January 1917, he was appointed to the Distinguished Service Order for his services the previous year and the following month he was gazetted as a recipient of the Serbian Order of the White Eagle with Swords for his services at Gallipoli.

Meldrum led his regiment during the First Battle of Gaza, getting as far as the perimeter of Gaza itself. In the followup Second Battle of Gaza, the WMR did even better. After the battle, Meldrum was promoted to brigadier general and made commander of the New Zealand Mounted Rifles Brigade, taking over from Edward Chaytor. He led the brigade in the Battle of Ayun Kara and the First Attack on Amman. He also co-ordinated the various units of the brigade well in the Battle of Beersheba. After the war, he was made a Companion of the Order of the Bath in recognition of his services in Egypt and Palestine. He had also been mentioned in despatches a further two times.

== Later life ==
On returning to New Zealand, Meldrum took up practicing law in New Plymouth. His farms, unprofitable because of the low wool prices, were sold and he also separated from his wife. In 1921, he moved to the town of Greymouth where he was the magistrate for several years. In 1927, having secured a divorce, he remarried. With his second wife, Clare Dodson, he had two daughters and a son. He served as Mayor of Greymouth from 1935 to 1938. During the Second World War, he was involved in the Home Guard for the Greymouth and Westport area and for two years, from 1942 to 1944, chaired the Armed Forces Appeal Board.

His second son, William John David Meldrum (known as William), joined the New Zealand Army and it was during a visit to see him at Burnham Military Camp that Meldrum died, on 13 February 1964. He was survived by four children and his second wife. His son William was a major with the army. His nephew, Maurice Dodson, was later Chief of Army.
