= 1909 Rangitikei by-election =

New Zealand by-election

- 23 September 1909
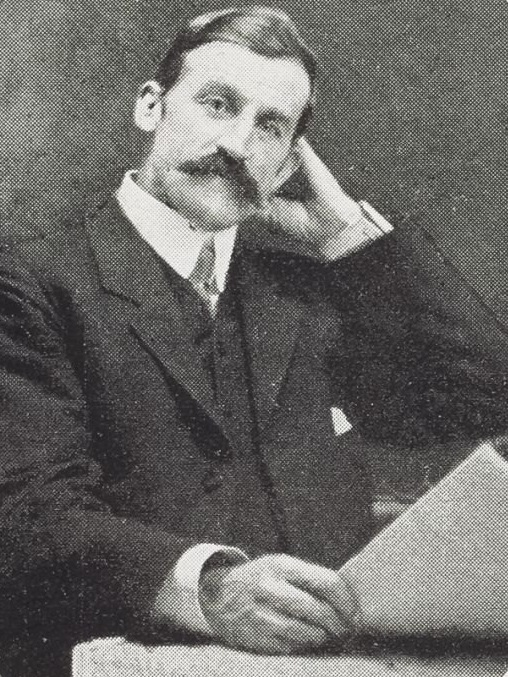

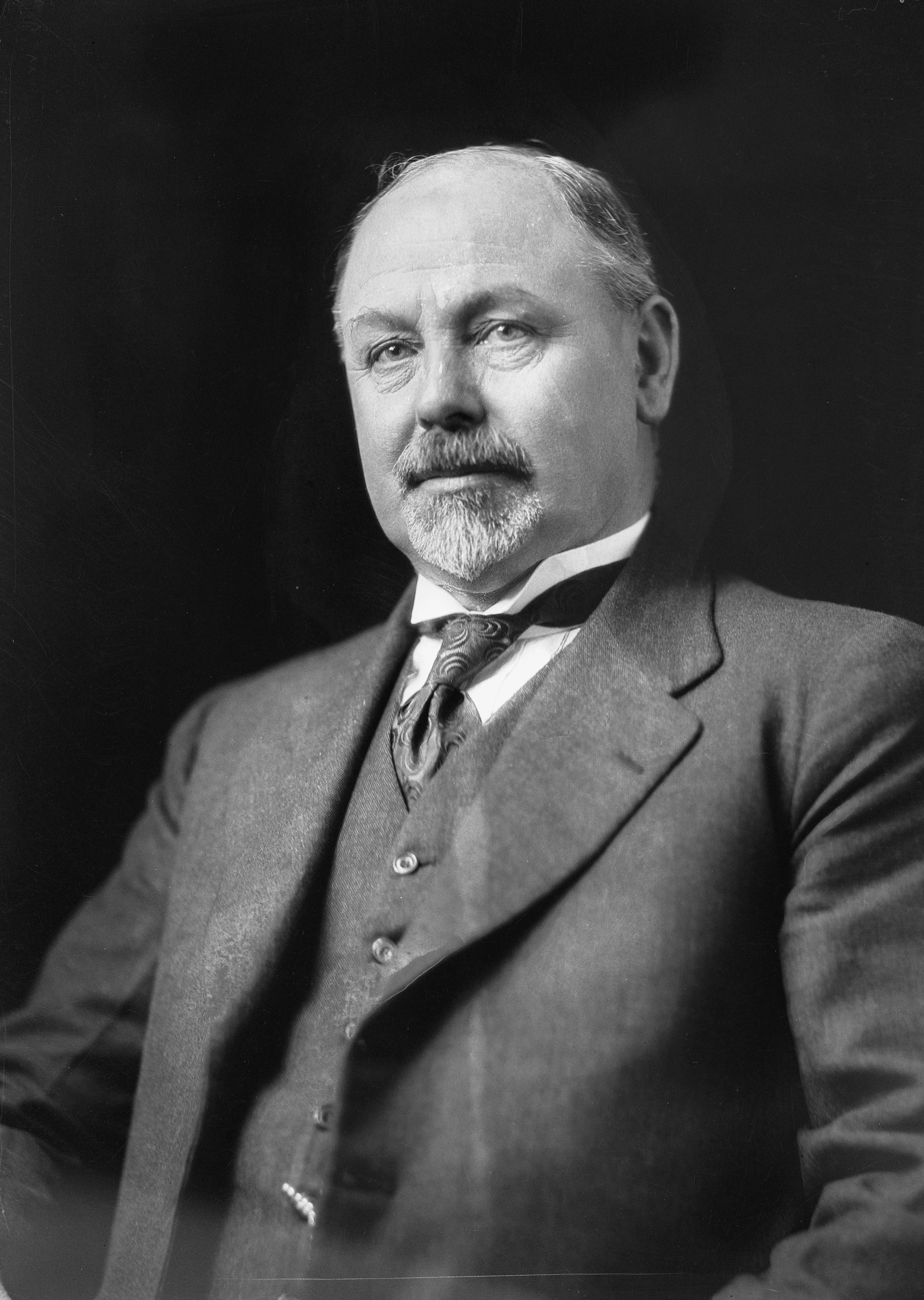
Candidate	Robbie Smith	Frank Hockly
Party	Liberal	Reform
Popular vote	2,410	2,011
Percentage	54.51	45.49
Member before election
Arthur Remington
Liberal
Elected Member
Robbie Smith
Liberal

The 1909 Rangitikei by-election was a by-election held during the 17th New Zealand Parliament in the Rangitikei electorate of the North Island. This was the sixth by-election since the Rangitikei electorate was established for the 1861 election. The previous by-election took place in 1892 and the following one took place in 1978. The Second Ballot Act 1908 was in force and in the first ballot, and Frank Hockly of the opposition Reform Party won the first ballot, but Robbie Smith of the governing Liberal Party was ultimately chosen in the second ballot.

== Background ==
The by-election was caused after the death of Liberal Party MP Arthur Remington on 17 August 1909. Remington died at his home in Tinakori Road, Wellington, at the age of 53.

Six candidates were announced on 9 September for the by-election: Frank Hockly and George Hutchison were candidates for the opposition, Robert Hornblow was a candidate for Liberal–Labour, James Georgetti was an independent, and Robbie Smith and William Meldrum were candidates for the Liberal Party. However, ultimately George Hutchison did not appear on the ballot as he agreed to stand down in the interests of the Reform Party in favour of Hockly.

The Second Ballot Act 1908 was in force and had previously been used for the 1908 election. This was the second by-election where it applied, and the act stipulated that the leading candidate had to obtain an absolute majority of the votes, or else the two highest polling candidates would face each other in a second election. No candidate received an absolute majority in the first ballot on 17 September and consequently a second ballot took place on 23 September.

== Results ==
The following tables give the election results:

=== First ballot ===
1909 Rangitikei by-election: First ballot
Party	Candidate	Votes	%	±%
Reform	Frank Hockly	1,548	37.04	
Liberal	Robert Smith	1,055	25.25	
Liberal	William Meldrum	903	21.61	
Independent	James Georgetti	340	8.14	
Liberal–Labour	Robert Hornblow	333	7.97	
Turnout		4,179		

Hockly received a plurality of votes, receiving 1,548 votes of the total of 4,179. Meldrum was expected to receive the votes from those in favour of the Liberal Government, however Smith ultimately came in second place. As no candidate received a majority, a second ballot took place one week later.

=== Second ballot ===
1909 Rangitikei by-election: Second ballot
Party	Candidate	Votes	%	±%
Liberal	Robert Smith	2,410	54.51	+29.26
Reform	Frank Hockly	2,011	45.49	+8.45
Majority		399	9.03	
Turnout		4,421		

The second ballot resulted in the return of Liberal candidate Smith, who was elected by a majority of 399 votes. Despite the in-fighting from Government candidates in the first ballot, they stood faithfully in favour of Smith for the second ballot. Thomas Mackenzie, who at the time served as Minister of Agriculture, attributed the victory to "a recognition on the part of the electors that the Government is honestly striving to do its very best in the interests of the country" and took the rural vote of the electorate to be an approval of his ministry's work.

=== Results by locality ===
Following are two tables showcasing the detailed results by locality for each of the two ballots.

First ballot

Locality	Hockly (Reform)		Smith (Liberal)		Meldrum (Liberal)		Georgetti (Independent)		Hornblow (Liberal–Labour)		Winner
Locality	Votes	%	Votes	%	Votes	%	Votes	%	Votes	%	Winner
Aberfeldie	12	75	0	0	3	18.75	1	6.25	0	0	Hockly
Awarua	2	22.22	4	44.44	2	22.22	1	11.11	0	0	Smith
Bell's Junction	14	34.15	19	46.34	6	14.63	1	2.44	1	2.44	Smith
Eastbrook	83	39.15	11	5.19	65	30.66	4	1.89	49	23.11	Hockly
Fordell	112	65.5	10	5.85	33	19.3	2	1.17	14	8.19	Hockly
Hunterville	181	38.35	8	1.69	257	54.45	14	2.97	12	2.54	Meldrum
Kaweka Road	4	50	0	0	4	50	0	0	0	0	Tied
Koeke	13	30.23	1	2.33	22	51.16	5	11.63	2	4.65	Meldrum
Kakatahi	14	29.79	11	23.4	20	42.55	1	2.13	1	2.13	Meldrum
Kauangaroa	18	75	2	8.33	4	16.67	0	0	0	0	Hockly
Long Acre Valley	13	56.52	1	4.35	9	39.13	0	0	0	0	Hockly
Lower Kawhatau	9	21.43	5	11.9	6	14.29	17	40.48	5	11.9	Georgetti
Mangahoe Road	30	90.91	1	3.03	2	6.06	0	0	0	0	Hockly
Mangamahu	49	74.24	1	1.52	12	18.18	4	6.06	0	0	Hockly
Mangaonoho	25	39.06	6	9.38	32	50	0	0	1	1.56	Meldrum
Mangaweka	52	16.2	61	19	25	7.79	111	34.58	72	22.43	Georgetti
Manui	7	22.58	6	19.35	5	16.13	3	9.68	10	32.26	Hornblow
Marybank	56	80	4	5.71	10	14.29	0	0	0	0	Hockly
Mataroa	47	42.73	23	20.91	16	14.55	13	11.82	11	10	Hockly
Moawhango	15	31.91	9	19.15	20	42.55	3	6.38	0	0	Meldrum
Ngawaka	6	16.22	27	72.97	3	8.11	0	0	1	2.7	Smith
Ohingaiti	57	46.72	36	29.51	15	12.3	12	9.84	2	1.64	Hockly
Okoia	82	86.32	2	2.11	8	8.42	0	0	3	3.16	Hockly
Otairi	33	67.35	0	0	16	32.65	0	0	0	0	Hockly
Pohonui	7	33.33	0	0	14	66.67	0	0	0	0	Meldrum
Polgreen's Corner	42	82.35	6	11.76	3	5.88	0	0	0	0	Hockly
Poukiore	31	70.45	0	0	11	25	1	2.27	1	2.27	Hockly
Pukeokahu	7	21.88	4	12.5	2	6.25	19	59.38	0	0	Georgetti
Rangiwaea	6	54.55	3	27.27	2	18.18	0	0	0	0	Hockly
Rata	41	37.61	42	38.53	22	20.18	2	1.83	2	1.83	Smith
Ruahine	17	28.81	23	38.98	10	16.95	4	6.78	5	8.47	Smith
Ruanui	15	50	7	23.33	4	13.33	4	13.33	0	0	Hockly
Taihape	113	16.03	403	57.16	93	13.19	27	3.83	69	9.79	Smith
Taoroa	21	53.85	5	12.82	8	20.51	2	5.13	3	7.69	Hockly
Tauakira	13	72.22	1	5.56	1	5.56	3	16.67	0	0	Hockly
Te Kapua Block	9	30	14	46.67	7	23.33	0	0	0	0	Smith
Tiriraukawa	12	44.44	3	11.11	6	22.22	4	14.81	2	7.41	Hockly
Toi Toi	1	33.33	1	33.33	1	33.33	0	0	0	0	Tied
Torere	1	1.47	24	35.29	21	30.88	16	23.53	6	8.82	Smith
Turangarere Railway station	5	7.94	49	77.78	7	11.11	1	1.59	1	1.59	Smith
Turangarere Schoolhouse	19	45.24	19	45.24	4	9.52	0	0	0	0	Tied
Upokongaro	59	64.13	2	2.17	8	8.7	18	19.57	5	5.43	Hockly
Upper Kawhatau	23	43.4	14	26.42	1	1.89	10	18.87	5	9.43	Hockly
Upper Turakina Valley	14	35.9	0	0	24	61.54	1	2.56	0	0	Meldrum
Utiku	20	13.79	67	46.21	14	9.66	15	10.34	29	20	Smith
Wainui	12	40	14	46.67	4	13.33	0	0	0	0	Smith
Wakelin's	5	17.86	10	35.71	3	10.71	2	7.14	8	28.57	Smith
Wairepo	9	47.37	3	15.79	3	15.79	1	5.26	3	15.79	Hockly
Whangaehu	36	64.29	4	7.14	11	19.64	2	3.57	3	5.36	Hockly
Winiata	12	19.05	27	42.86	8	12.7	11	17.46	5	7.94	Smith
Total	1,548	37.04	1,055	25.25	903	21.61	340	8.14	333	7.97	Hockly

Second ballot

Locality	Hockly (Reform)		Smith (Liberal)		Winner
Locality	Votes	%	Votes	%	Winner
Aberfeldie	16	94.12	1	5.89	Hockly
Awarua	0	0	4	100	Smith
Bell's Junction	21	44.68	26	55.32	Smith
Bennett's Siding	10	12.5	70	87.5	Smith
Eastbrook	153	49.58	155	50.32	Smith
Fordell	112	69.57	49	30.43	Hockly
Hunterville	223	47.55	246	52.45	Smith
Kaweka Road	6	75	2	25	Hockly
Koeke	19	45.24	23	54.76	Smith
Kakatahi	16	38.1	26	61.9	Smith
Kauangaroa	23	82.14	5	17.86	Hockly
Long Acre Valley	13	72.22	5	27.78	Hockly
Lower Kawhatau	12	26.09	34	73.91	Smith
Mangahoe Road	35	100	0	0	Hockly
Mangamahu	56	77.78	16	22.22	Hockly
Mangaonoho	26	40.63	38	59.38	Smith
Mangaweka	85	28.43	214	71.57	Smith
Manui	11	33.33	22	66.67	Smith
Marybank	72	80	18	20	Hockly
Mataroa	48	48	52	52	Smith
Moawhango	26	53.06	23	46.94	Hockly
Ngawaka	17	41.46	24	58.54	Smith
Ohingaiti	72	60	48	40	Hockly
Okoia	92	88.46	12	11.54	Hockly
Otairi	35	72.92	13	27.08	Hockly
Pohonui	9	39.13	14	60.87	Smith
Polgreen's Corner	51	87.93	7	12.07	Hockly
Poukiore	39	81.25	9	18.75	Hockly
Pukeokahu	16	57.14	12	42.86	Hockly
Rangiwaea	7	58.33	5	41.67	Hockly
Rata	56	47.46	62	52.54	Smith
Ruahine	13	20	52	80	Smith
Ruanui	22	70.97	9	29.03	Hockly
Taihape	188	23.95	597	76.05	Smith
Taoroa	26	60.47	17	39.53	Hockly
Tauakira	6	50	6	50	Tied
Te Kapua Block	11	36.67	19	63.33	Smith
Tiriraukawa	14	50	14	50	Tied
Toi Toi	1	50	1	50	Tied
Torere	12	16.9	59	83.1	Smith
Turangarere Railway station	6	7.5	74	92.5	Smith
Turangarere Schoolhouse	22	52.38	20	47.62	Hockly
Upokongaro	53	61.63	33	38.37	Hockly
Upper Kawhatau	27	55.1	22	44.9	Hockly
Upper Turakina Valley	17	50	17	50	Tied
Utiku	50	33.56	99	66.44	Smith
Wainui	16	47.06	18	52.94	Smith
Wakelin's	8	22.22	28	77.78	Smith
Wairepo	10	50	10	50	Tied
Whangaehu	36	62.07	22	37.93	Hockly
Winiata	16	23.53	52	76.47	Smith
Total	2,011	45.49	2,410	54.51	Smith

== See also ==
- List of New Zealand by-elections
- Rangitikei by-election (disambiguation), other by-elections for the Rangitikei electorate
