= Second Ballot Act 1908 =

Former Act of Parliament in New Zealand

New Zealand Parliament
- Assented to: 6 October 1908

Legislative history
- Introduced by: Joseph Ward
- Third reading: 8 September 1908
- Passed: 6 October 1908
- Status: Repealed

The Second Ballot Act 1908 was an Act of the New Zealand Parliament for regulating elections to the New Zealand House of Representatives. The Act implemented the two-round voting system to ensure that Members of Parliament were elected by a majority, not a simple plurality like the first-past-the-post voting system that had been used since the 1853 New Zealand general election.

The Second Ballot Act 1908 was in force for the 1908 and 1911 general elections, and a number of by-elections. The Legislature Amendment Act 1913 removed the two-round voting system and reinstated first past the post.

== Operation ==
The Act required every successful candidate in a parliamentary election to receive an absolute majority of votes. If a majority was not obtained on election night, a second ballot between the two highest-polling candidates was required to be held seven days later (except, in 1908 only, in the Bay of Islands, Bay of Plenty, Kaipara, Marsden, Motueka, Taumarunui, Tauranga, Wakatipu, Wallace, and Westland electorates, where any required second ballot would be held fourteen days later).

Candidates at the second ballot were not permitted to withdraw from the election. If a candidate at the second ballot election died between the first and second ballots, the Act required a fresh election to be held. The Act specified that, if a judicial recount on the first ballot determined that a candidate in fact had a majority, the second ballot was to be abandoned or ignored if it had already been conducted. Consistent with the previous tiebreaker method used under New Zealand's primary electoral legislation of the time, the Electoral Act 1905, a tie on the second ballot was broken by the returning officer's casting vote.

An early draft of the legislation proposed considering a margin of more than 500 votes sufficient to be interpreted as a majority, but this was struck out by Parliament in its consideration of the bill.

== Legislative history ==
=== Enactment ===
Second ballot legislation had been regularly debated without success in the New Zealand Parliament for the previous twelve years. Three second ballot bills, in the name of premier Richard Seddon, were introduced in 1896, 1897 and 1898; all lost. A fourth attempt was made by Joseph Ward, then the Postmaster-General, in 1905.

Ward made his second attempt, and the fifth overall, to pass second ballot legislation in 1908 after he had become prime minister. The Second Ballot Act 1908 was passed 37–14 in the 16th session of the New Zealand Parliament in late 1908, ahead of that year's general election. The leader of the large, broadly left-of-centre Liberal Party, Ward feared that the emergence of the Independent Political Labour League would split the vote on the political left and thus be beneficial to the conservative opposition (who in 1909 would coalesce as the Reform Party). Ward expected that the two-round voting system would result in all second ballots to be between Liberal and conservative independent (later Reform) candidates. Opponents of the bill, such as William Herries, who preferred the contingent vote system (a variation of instant-runoff voting), cautioned that second ballot voting would "throw the power more into the hands of the faddists and the supporters of the candidates who are not in the first two [who could] fix practically the whole election if it is likely to be close."

The Second Ballot Act applied to general electorates only, and not to the four Maori constituencies.

=== Repeal ===
A new Reform government came to power between the 1911 and 1914 elections, when independents who had previously supported the Liberal Party changed allegiances. The new government repealed the Second Ballot Act 1908 through the Legislature Amendment Act 1913, a bill in the name of internal affairs minister Francis Bell, restoring first past the post elections that continued until 1996.

== Application ==
=== General elections ===
The Second Ballot Act was in force for only two general elections: 1908 and 1911. In 1908, second ballots took place in 23 constituencies, when 15 of the leading candidates were elected and eight were defeated. In 1911, 30 elections went to a second ballot.

Ward's prediction that the second ballot system would always disadvantage Labour did not come true. In the 1908 Wellington East electorate contest, the Liberals stood two candidates who were both eliminated on the first ballot. This left the Independent Political Labour League (IPLL) candidate, David McLaren, facing a conservative candidate and with many liberal voters transferring their allegiance to McLaren, he became the only candidate of the IPLL who was ever elected to the House of Representatives. McLaren lost his 1911 re-election bid but four other Labour-affiliated candidates were elected in other constituencies that year, all on the second ballot.

=== By-elections ===
Seven by-elections were held while the Second Ballot Act was in force. The two by-elections where a second ballot was required both saw Social Democratic Party candidates elected, with Liberal support, over Reform candidates.

Electorate and by-election		Date	Incumbent	Cause	Winner
Thames	1909	4 February	James McGowan	Appointed to Legislative Council	Edmund Taylor
Rangitikei	1909	16 September	Arthur Remington	Death	Robert Smith
Auckland East	1910	16 June	Frederick Baume	Death	Arthur Myers
Christchurch North	1911	17 August	Tommy Taylor	Death	Leonard Isitt
Egmont	1912	17 September	Thomas Mackenzie	Resignation	Charles Wilkinson
Grey^{†}	1913	17 & 24 July	Arthur Guinness	Death	Paddy Webb
Lyttelton^{†}	1913	9 & 16 December	George Laurenson	Death	James McCombs

^{†} depicts by-elections in which a second ballot was held.
