= 1875 Rangitikei by-election =

New Zealand by-election

- 24 April 1875
- Turnout: 244
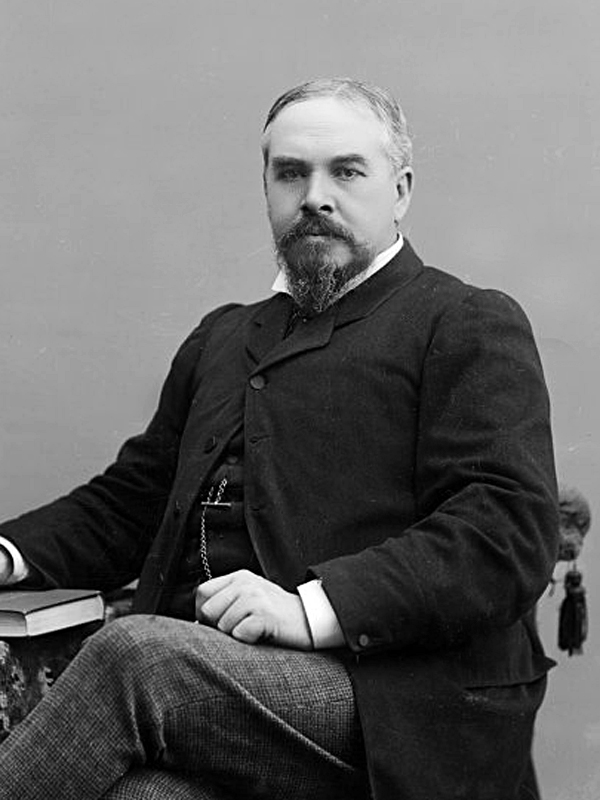

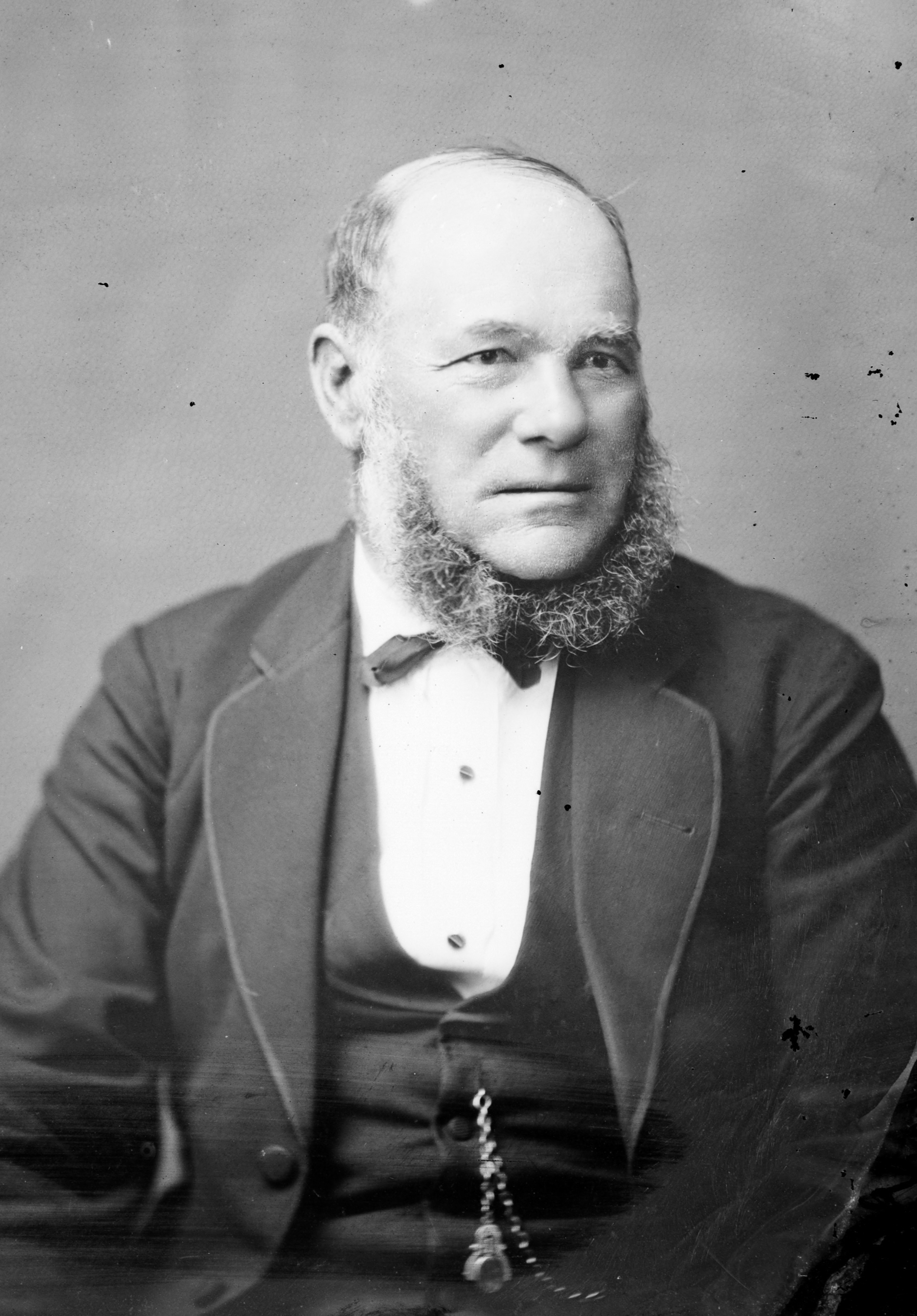
Candidate	John Ballance	William Hogg Watt
Party	Independent	Independent
Popular vote	112	105
Member before election
William Fox
Independent
Elected Member
John Ballance
Independent

The 1875 Rangitikei by-election was a by-election held on 24 April 1875 during the 5th New Zealand Parliament in the Rangitikei electorate on the West Coast of the North Island.

The by-election was held because of the resignation of sitting member of parliament and previous Premier William Fox on 11 March 1875 in order to pay an extended visit to England.

This election saw John Ballance narrowly win the seat by just seven votes over his main opponent, William Hogg Watt who had represented the Rangitikei electorate from 1866 to 1868 when he resigned. Conservative George Hutchison also ran. He was the son of William Hutchison a former mayor of Wellington and Member of Parliament, though performed poorly.

== Results ==
The following table gives the election results:

1875 Rangitikei by-election
Party	Candidate	Votes	%	±%
Independent	John Ballance	112	45.90	
Independent	William Hogg Watt	105	43.03	
Independent	George Hutchison	27	11.06	
Majority		7	2.86	
Turnout		244		

== See also ==
- Rangitikei by-election (disambiguation), other by-elections for the Rangitikei electorate
