= Robbie Smith (politician) =

New Zealand politician (1871–1958)

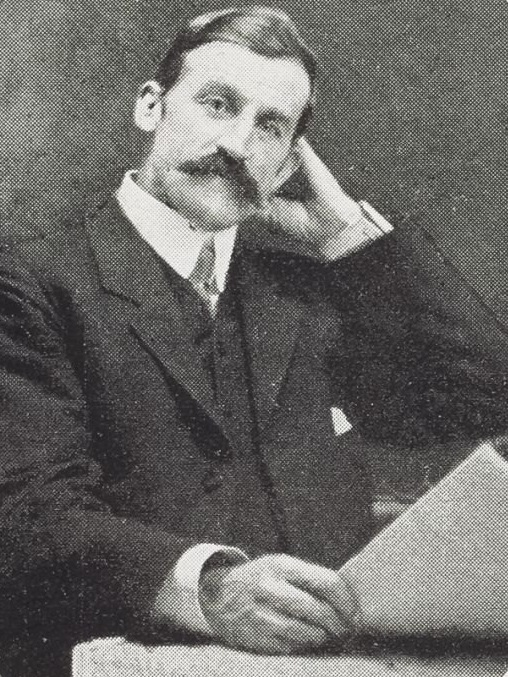
Smith in 1909

Robert William Smith (1871 – 2 June 1958), known as Robbie, was a New Zealand politician of the Liberal Party.

== Political career ==
New Zealand Parliament
Years	Term	Electorate	Party
1909–1911	17th	Rangitikei	Liberal
1911–1914	18th	Waimarino	Liberal
1914–1919	19th	Waimarino	Liberal
1919–1922	20th	Waimarino	Liberal
1925–1928	22nd	Waimarino	Liberal
1928	Changed allegiance to:		United

Smith won the Rangitikei electorate in a 1909 by-election and held it to 1911. In 1911, he won the Waimarino electorate, which he held to 1922, when he was defeated by Labour's Frank Langstone. In the 1925 election, Smith won it back, but was defeated again by Langstone in the 1928 election.

New Zealand Parliament
Preceded by Arthur Remington	Member of Parliament for Rangitikei; 1909–1911	Succeeded by Edward Newman
New constituency	Member of Parliament for Waimarino; 1911–1922 1925–1928	Succeeded by Frank Langstone
Preceded by Frank Langstone	Member of Parliament for Waimarino; 1911–1922 1925–1928	Succeeded by Frank Langstone
