= Arthur Remington =

New Zealand politician (1856–1909)

Arthur Edward Remington (28 July 1856 – 17 August 1909) was a Liberal Party Member of Parliament in New Zealand.

== Biography ==
New Zealand Parliament
Years	Term	Electorate	Party
1902–1905	15th	Rangitikei	Liberal
1905–1908	16th	Rangitikei	Liberal
1908–1909	17th	Rangitikei	Liberal

Remington was born in 1856 at New Plymouth. Due to the New Zealand Wars, the family returned to their native Jersey, where he received his education. The family returned to New Zealand in 1868, first settling in Auckland, but soon residing in Tauranga, where he first became involved in local body politics.

In 1877, Remington moved to Bulls, where he was a chemist selling tooth powder, which was advanced at the time. He was declared bankrupt in 1879.

Remington first stood for Parliament in the Patea electorate in 1896 and 1899, coming second both times. He also stood in the first 1901 by-election against an "official" Liberal candidate, which allowed an opponent of the Liberal Government to win.

He won the Rangitikei electorate in the 1902 general election, and held it until he died in 1909. His death triggered the 1909 by-election, which was won by Robbie Smith.

Remington died at his home in Tinakori Road, Wellington. He was survived by his wife Elizabeth Susanna Remington.

== Notes ==
New Zealand Parliament
Preceded by Frank Lethbridge	Member of Parliament for Rangitikei; 1902–1909	Succeeded by Robbie Smith
