= Rangitīkei (electorate) =

- Single-member general constituency for the New Zealand House of Representatives
- Interactive map of boundaries from the 2026 election
- Formation: 1861,
- Region: Manawatū-Whanganui; Waikato; Hawke's Bay
- Character: Rural
- Term: 3 years

Member for Rangitīkei
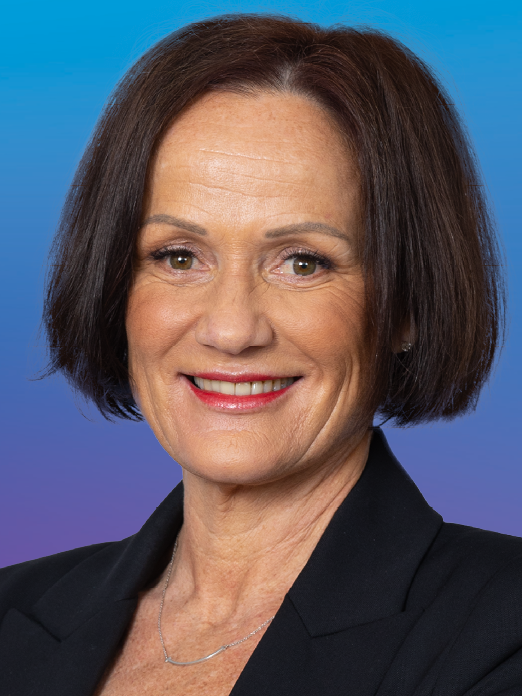
- Suze Redmayne since 14 October 2023
- Party: National
- List MPs: Andrew Hoggard (ACT)
- Previous MP: Ian McKelvie (National)
Party vote distribution

Rangitīkei (before 2008 spelled Rangitikei without a macron) is a New Zealand parliamentary electorate, returning one Member of Parliament to the New Zealand House of Representatives. The current MP for Rangitīkei is Suze Redmayne of the National Party. She has held this position since 2023.

The electorate has existed continuously since the 1861 general election.

== Profile ==
Map of boundaries at the 2020 and 2023 general elections

Rangitīkei is the third largest general electorate by area in the North Island. It encircles, but does not include, Palmerston North. The electorate straddles State Highway 1 through Bulls, Marton, Taihape, and Waiouru as far as Mount Ruapehu. Its largest centre is Feilding. Its western boundary, from south of Whanganui, extends northwards to include the communities of Ohakune, National Park, and Taumarunui. At the 2014 boundary review, the population of the RangitĪkei electorate was below tolerance and projected to decline further, so the Representation Commission shifted population around Shannon from Ōtaki into RangitĪkei. At the 2025 boundary review, the electorate would be shifted southwards to accommodate boundary changes in the Kāpiti region, gaining the Horowhenua communities of Foxton, Levin and Manakau, while no longer retaining the communities around Palmerston North and in the Ruapehu District.

Between census 2006 and census 2013, the Rangitīkei electorate experienced a 0.4% decline in population in comparison to a 5.3% increase in New Zealand as a whole. One in ten (10.0%) stated their highest qualification as a Level 2 certificate, the fourth-largest share among general electorates. One in ten (10.4%) also listed their occupation as a community and personal service worker, the fifth-largest percentage. Six industries accounted for close to two-thirds (61.3%) of those working in 2013: agriculture, forestry, and fishing (16.8%); manufacturing (9.3%); education and training (9.0%); public administration (8.9%); health care and social assistance (8.9%); and retail trade (8.4%).

== History ==
A seat named Wanganui and Rangitikei was contested at the very first general election in New Zealand in 1853. The use of an electorate named Rangitikei in its own right dates from the third session of the New Zealand Parliament. In a somewhat auspicious start for the seat, the first Member of Parliament for the seat in 1861 was future Prime Minister William Fox. Fox resigned twice; first on 16 May 1865, causing the 1865 by-election (won by Robert Pharazyn), and then on 11 March 1875, causing the 1875 by-election (won by John Ballance).

Three members died while holding the seat: Douglas Hastings Macarthur died on 24 May 1892 and was succeeded by John Stevens; Arthur Remington died on 17 August 1909 and was succeeded by Robbie Smith; and Sir Roy Jack died on 24 December 1977 and was succeeded by Bruce Beetham.

The current boundaries of the seat date from the introduction of mixed-member proportional (MMP) voting in 1996. The seat was created by adding the southern tip of King Country to the northern tip of the Manawatu seat, and drafting in the towns to the east of Whanganui from Waitotara. The rural conservative nature of the seat makes it a safe National seat, though for six years in the 1970s and 80s it was held by a third party MP, Social Credit leader Bruce Beetham.

=== Members of Parliament ===
Key

Independent Conservative Liberal Reform Labour National Social Credit

Election	Winner
1861 election	William Fox
1865 by-election	Robert Pharazyn
1866 election	William Hogg Watt
1868 by-election	William Fox
1871 election	William Fox
1875 by-election	John Ballance
1876 election	John Ballance
1879 election	William Willis
1880 by-election	William Fox
1881 election	John Stevens
1884 election	Robert Bruce
1887 election	Robert Bruce
1890 election	Douglas Macarthur
1892 by-election	Robert Bruce
1893 election	John Stevens
1896 election	Frank Lethbridge
1899 election	Frank Lethbridge
1902 election	Arthur Remington
1905 election	Arthur Remington
1908 election	Arthur Remington
1909 by-election	Robbie Smith
1911 election	Edward Newman
1914 election	Edward Newman
1919 election	Billy Glenn
1922 election	Billy Glenn
1925 election	Billy Glenn
1928 election	James Thomas Hogan
1931 election	Alexander Stuart
1935 election	Ormond Wilson
1938 election	Edward Gordon
1943 election	Edward Gordon
1946 election	Edward Gordon
1949 election	Edward Gordon
1951 election	Edward Gordon
1954 election	Norman Shelton
1957 election	Norman Shelton
1960 election	Norman Shelton
1963 election	Norman Shelton
1966 election	Norman Shelton
1969 election	Norman Shelton
1972 election	Sir Roy Jack
1975 election	Sir Roy Jack
1978 by-election	Bruce Beetham
1978 election	Bruce Beetham
1981 election	Bruce Beetham
1984 election	Denis Marshall
1987 election	Denis Marshall
1990 election	Denis Marshall
1993 election	Denis Marshall
1996 election	Denis Marshall
1999 election	Simon Power
2002 election	Simon Power
2005 election	Simon Power
2008 election	Simon Power
2011 election	Ian McKelvie
2014 election	Ian McKelvie
2017 election	Ian McKelvie
2020 election	Ian McKelvie
2023 election	Suze Redmayne

=== List MPs ===
Members of Parliament elected from party lists in elections where that person also unsuccessfully contested the Rangitīkei electorate. Unless otherwise stated, all MPs terms began and ended at general elections.

Key Labour ACT

Election	Winner
1996 election	Jill White (Note: White resigned from Parliament on 24 November 1998.)
2022	Soraya Peke-Mason
2023 election	Andrew Hoggard

== Election results ==
=== 2026 election ===
The next election will be held on 7 November 2026. Candidates for Rangitīkei are listed at Candidates in the 2026 New Zealand general election by electorate § Rangitīkei. Official results will be available after 27 November 2026.

=== 2023 election ===
2023 general election: Rangitīkei
Notes:	Blue background denotes the winner of the electorate vote. Pink background denotes a candidate elected from their party list. Yellow background denotes an electorate win by a list member, or other incumbent. A ✓ or ✗ denotes status of any incumbent, win or lose respectively.						
Party	Candidate	Votes	%	±%	Party votes	%	±%
National	Suze Redmayne	18,945	46.33	+1.68	17,018	41.08	+10.98
Labour	Zulfiqar Butt	9,160	22.40	−15.14	8,993	21.71	−22.62
ACT	Andrew Hoggard	5,914	14.46	+9.99	5,655	13.65	+2.32
NZ First	Helma Vermeulen	3,167	7.74	+5.45	3,768	9.09	+5.74
Green	Bernard Long	3,153	7.71	+2.93	3,061	7.38	+2.79
Opportunities					630	1.52	+0.12
NZ Loyal					622	1.50	–
Te Pāti Māori					577	1.39	+0.96
NewZeal					260	0.62	+0.31
Legalise Cannabis					206	0.49	+0.05
DemocracyNZ					142	0.34	–
Freedoms NZ					97	0.23	–
Animal Justice					82	0.19	–
New Conservative					73	0.17	–
Women's Rights					35	0.08	–
Leighton Baker Party					30	0.07	–
New Nation					24	0.05	–
Informal votes		550			150		
Total valid votes		40,889			41,423		
National hold	Majority	9,785	23.93	+16.82			

=== 2020 election ===
2020 general election: Rangitīkei
Notes:	Blue background denotes the winner of the electorate vote. Pink background denotes a candidate elected from their party list. Yellow background denotes an electorate win by a list member, or other incumbent. A ✓ or ✗ denotes status of any incumbent, win or lose respectively.						
Party	Candidate	Votes	%	±%	Party votes	%	±%
National	✓ Ian McKelvie	18,592	44.65	−14.94	12,634	30.10	−21.58
Labour	Soraya Peke-Mason	15,631	37.54	+8.93	18,610	44.33	+15.49
Green	Ali Hale Tilley	1,992	4.78	−0.88	1,927	4.59	+0.20
ACT	Neil John Wilson	1,860	4.47	+3.88	4,758	11.33	+10.87
New Conservative	Reuben Leung Wai	970	2.33	+1.73	827	1.97	+1.67
NZ First	Antony Woollams	953	2.29	−5.66	1,406	3.35	−7.00
Advance NZ	Ricky Cribb	879	2.11	–	411	0.98	–
Opportunities					587	1.40	−0.86
Legalise Cannabis					184	0.44	+0.05
Māori Party					179	0.43	−0.02
ONE					129	0.31	–
Outdoors					44	0.10	−0.02
Social Credit					21	0.05	+0.02
Sustainable NZ					16	0.04	–
Vision NZ					14	0.03	–
TEA					9	0.02	–
Heartland					7	0.02	–
Informal votes		761			216		
Total valid votes		41,638			41,979		
National hold	Majority	2,961	7.11	−23.87			

=== 2017 election ===
2017 general election: Rangitīkei
Notes:	Blue background denotes the winner of the electorate vote. Pink background denotes a candidate elected from their party list. Yellow background denotes an electorate win by a list member, or other incumbent. A ✓ or ✗ denotes status of any incumbent, win or lose respectively.						
Party	Candidate	Votes	%	±%	Party votes	%	±%
National	✓ Ian McKelvie	20,809	59.59	−0.13	19,472	51.68	−1.78
Labour	Heather Warren	10,519	28.61	+1.13	10,867	28.84	+10.42
NZ First	Rob Stevenson	2,923	7.95	+1.09	3,900	10.35	−0.90
Green	Robin McCandless	2,082	5.66	—	1,653	4.39	−3.40
Conservative	Cedric Backhouse	221	0.60	−3.79	114	0.30	−5.78
ACT	Neil Wilson	217	0.59	+0.07	173	0.46	+0.08
Opportunities					852	2.26	—
Māori Party					169	0.45	−0.11
Legalise Cannabis					147	0.39	−0.04
Ban 1080					96	0.25	−0.05
Outdoors					44	0.12	—
United Future					37	0.10	−0.12
People's Party					18	0.05	—
Democrats					11	0.03	−0.01
Mana					10	0.03	−0.57 (Note: 2017 Mana Party swing is relative to the votes for Internet-Mana in 2014; it shared a party list with the Internet Party in the 2014 election)
Internet					3	0.01	−0.59 (Note: 2017 Internet Party swing is relative to the votes for Internet-Mana in 2014; it shared a party list with Mana Party in the 2014 election)
Informal votes		392			112		
Total valid votes		37,163			37,678		
Turnout		37,927	83.51	+2.10			
National hold	Majority	10,290	30.98	−1.26			

=== 2014 election ===
2014 general election: Rangitīkei
Notes:	Blue background denotes the winner of the electorate vote. Pink background denotes a candidate elected from their party list. Yellow background denotes an electorate win by a list member, or other incumbent. A ✓ or ✗ denotes status of any incumbent, win or lose respectively.						
Party	Candidate	Votes	%	±%	Party votes	%	±%
National	✓ Ian McKelvie	20,487	59.72	+0.85	18,596	53.46	−0.48
Labour	Deborah Russell	9,427	27.48	−1.18	6,408	18.42	−2.77
NZ First	Romuald Rudzki	2,352	6.86	+6.86	3,914	11.25	+3.99
Conservative	Roy Brown	1,505	4.39	+0.66	2,115	6.08	+1.86
ACT	Neil Wilson	179	0.52	−0.45	131	0.38	−1.13
Green					2,709	7.79	−1.65
Internet Mana					208	0.60	+0.40 (Note: 2014 Internet Mana swing is relative to the votes for Mana in 2011; it shared a party list with Internet in the 2014 election.)
Māori Party					195	0.56	−0.22
Legalise Cannabis					151	0.43	−0.05
Ban 1080					106	0.30	+0.30
United Future					75	0.22	−0.60
Civilian					23	0.07	+0.07
Democrats					15	0.04	−0.05
Independent Coalition					12	0.03	+0.03
Focus					7	0.02	+0.02
Informal votes		355			119		
Total valid votes		34,305			34,784		
National hold	Majority	11,060	32.24	+2.03			

=== 2011 election ===
2011 general election: Rangitīkei
Notes:	Blue background denotes the winner of the electorate vote. Pink background denotes a candidate elected from their party list. Yellow background denotes an electorate win by a list member, or other incumbent. A ✓ or ✗ denotes status of any incumbent, win or lose respectively.						
Party	Candidate	Votes	%	±%	Party votes	%	±%
National	Ian McKelvie	18,284	58.87	−6.83	17,115	53.94	+1.49
Labour	Josie Pagani	8,902	28.66	−0.75	6,723	21.19	−6.35
Green	Maree Brannigan	2,108	6.79	+6.79	2,994	9.44	+4.00
Conservative	Ian Robertson	1,159	3.73	+3.73	1,333	4.20	+4.20
ACT	Hayden Fitzgerald	302	0.97	−0.64	478	1.51	−2.78
Mana	Peter Cleave	110	0.35	+0.35	62	0.20	+0.20
Independent	Charles Turner	102	0.33	+0.33			
Independent	Grant Seton	91	0.29	+0.29			
NZ First					2,305	7.26	+2.17
United Future					260	0.82	−0.33
Māori Party					247	0.78	−0.13
Legalise Cannabis					152	0.48	-+0.08
Democrats					27	0.09	+0.03
Libertarianz					23	0.07	+0.01
Alliance					12	0.04	−0.06
Informal votes		695			363		
Total valid votes		31,058			31,731		
National hold	Majority	9,382	30.21	−6.08			

Electorate (as at 26 November 2011): 41,343

=== 2008 election ===
2008 general election: Rangitīkei
Notes:	Blue background denotes the winner of the electorate vote. Pink background denotes a candidate elected from their party list. Yellow background denotes an electorate win by a list member, or other incumbent. A ✓ or ✗ denotes status of any incumbent, win or lose respectively.						
Party	Candidate	Votes	%	±%	Party votes	%	±%
National	✓ Simon Power	21,801	65.70		17,711	52.45	
Labour	Jills Angus Burney	9,759	29.41		9,298	27.53	
Independent	Steve Gibson	786	2.37	+2.37			
ACT	Jean Thompson	535	1.61		1,448	4.29	
United Future	John Langford	300	0.90		388	1.15	
Green					1,836	5.44	
NZ First					1,719	5.09	
Progressive					309	0.92	
Māori Party					307	0.92	
Bill and Ben					291	0.86	
Legalise Cannabis					135	0.40	
Kiwi					132	0.39	
Family Party					80	0.24	
Alliance					33	0.10	
Libertarianz					22	0.07	
Workers Party					20	0.06	
Democrats					18	0.05	
Pacific					17	0.05	
RAM					2	0.01	
RONZ					2	0.01	
Informal votes		362			138		
Total valid votes		33,181			33,768		
National hold	Majority	12,042	36.29				

=== 2005 election ===
2005 general election: Rangitikei
Notes:	Blue background denotes the winner of the electorate vote. Pink background denotes a candidate elected from their party list. Yellow background denotes an electorate win by a list member, or other incumbent. A ✓ or ✗ denotes status of any incumbent, win or lose respectively.						
Party	Candidate	Votes	%	±%	Party votes	%	±%
National	✓ Simon Power	19,119	60.42		14,721	46.03	
Labour	Marilyn Brown	9,459	29.89		11,538	36.08	
NZ First	Murray Strawbridge	1,335	4.22		2,363	7.39	
United Future	Rob Moodie	718	2.27		1,027	3.21	
Independent	Richard Peirce	426	1.35				
Māori Party	Abe Hepi	369	1.17		195	0.61	
ACT	John Waugh	215	0.68		446	1.39	
Green					1,083	3.39	
Progressive					287	0.90	
Destiny					114	0.36	
Legalise Cannabis					85	0.27	
Christian Heritage					47	0.15	
Alliance					22	0.07	
Democrats					12	0.04	
Libertarianz					12	0.04	
One NZ					9	0.03	
99 MP					6	0.02	
Family Rights					5	0.02	
RONZ					5	0.02	
Direct Democracy					2	0.01	
Informal votes		216			100		
Total valid votes		31,641			31,979		
National hold	Majority	9,660	30.53				

=== 1999 election ===
Refer to Candidates in the New Zealand general election 1999 by electorate#Rangitikei for a list of candidates.

=== 1996 election ===
1996 general election: Rangitikei
Notes:	Blue background denotes the winner of the electorate vote. Pink background denotes a candidate elected from their party list. Yellow background denotes an electorate win by a list member, or other incumbent. A ✓ or ✗ denotes status of any incumbent, win or lose respectively.						
Party	Candidate	Votes	%	±%	Party votes	%	±%
National	Denis Marshall	10,925	33.66	−10.37	11,659	35.79	
Labour	Jill White	8,162	25.15		7,782	23.89	
Alliance	Hamish MacIntyre	4,583	14.12		3,679	11.29	
NZ First	Peter Woolston	3,450	10.63		4,921	15.10	
Independent	Bruce Beetham	3,365	10.36				
Christian Coalition	Vic Jarvis	937	2.88		1,772	5.43	
ACT	Victor Bailey	566	1.74		1,665	5.11	
Conservatives	Jim Howard	394	1.21		176	0.54	
Natural Law	John Blatchford	68	0.20		63	0.19	
Legalise Cannabis					393	1.20	
United NZ					151	0.46	
McGillicuddy Serious					124	0.38	
Animals First					62	0.19	
Progressive Green					52	0.15	
Green Society					18	0.05	
Mana Māori					16	0.04	
Advance New Zealand					12	0.03	
Libertarianz					12	0.03	
Superannuitants & Youth					10	0.03	
Ethnic Minority Party					7	0.02	
Informal votes		212			88		
Total valid votes		32,450			32,574		
Turnout		32,662					
National win new seat	Majority	2,763	8.51				

=== 1993 election ===
1993 general election: Rangitikei
Party	Candidate	Votes	%	±%
National	Denis Marshall	8,346	44.03	−11.26
Alliance	Bob Peck	4,924	25.97	
Labour	Andrew Schmidt	4,651	24.53	
Christian Heritage	Keith Burgess	728	3.84	−0.31
McGillicuddy Serious	Russell Shaw	217	1.14	+0.35
Natural Law	Bruna Michelini	88	0.46	
Majority		3,422	18.05	−16.82
Turnout		18,954	82.70	+0.21
Registered electors		22,917		

=== 1990 election ===
1990 general election: Rangitikei
Party	Candidate	Votes	%	±%
National	Denis Marshall	9,715	55.29	+3.64
Labour	Patricia Barton	3,588	20.42	
Social Credit	Beverley Beetham	1,786	10.16	
Green	David Jowett	1,213	6.90	
Christian Heritage	Keith Burgess	730	4.15	
NewLabour	David Husbands	396	2.25	
McGillicuddy Serious	Russell Shaw	140	0.79	
Majority		6,127	34.87	+12.87
Turnout		17,568	82.49	−5.05
Registered electors		21,296		

=== 1987 election ===
1987 general election: Rangitikei
Party	Candidate	Votes	%	±%
National	Denis Marshall	9,480	51.65	+9.57
Democrats	Bruce Beetham	5,441	29.64	−9.91
Labour	David Srhoj	3,270	17.81	
Independent	H W Jensen	85	0.46	
McGillicuddy Serious	G J J Martin	77	0.41	
Majority		4,039	22.00	+19.47
Turnout		18,353	87.54	−5.08
Registered electors		20,963		

=== 1984 election ===
1984 general election: Rangitikei
Party	Candidate	Votes	%	±%
National	Denis Marshall	8,370	42.08	
Social Credit	Bruce Beetham	7,866	39.55	−10.93
Labour	Geoff Walpole	2,571	12.92	
NZ Party	Ian MacPherson	1,079	5.42	
Majority		504	2.53	
Turnout		19,886	92.62	+1.61
Registered electors		21,469		

=== 1981 election ===
1981 general election: Rangitikei
Party	Candidate	Votes	%	±%
Social Credit	Bruce Beetham	10,321	50.48	−2.19
National	Paul Bardwell	7,945	38.86	
Labour	Mark O'Connor	1,982	9.69	
Values	Denis Hocking	194	0.94	−0.02
Majority		2,376	11.62	−2.59
Turnout		20,442	91.01	+16.58
Registered electors		22,459		

=== 1978 election ===
1978 general election: Rangitikei
Party	Candidate	Votes	%	±%
Social Credit	Bruce Beetham	10,569	52.67	+4.64
National	Les Gandar	7,716	38.45	
Labour	Max Hodgson	1,490	7.42	
Values	Denis Hocking	194	0.96	−0.72
Majority		2,853	14.21	+4.79
Turnout		20,066	74.43	+12.11
Registered electors		26,957		

=== 1978 by-election ===
1978 Rangitikei by-election
Party	Candidate	Votes	%	±%
Social Credit	Bruce Beetham	6,804	48.03	+11.64
National	Jim Bull	5,469	38.61	
Labour	JJ Stewart	1,614	11.39	
Values	Denis Hocking	264	1.68	
Independent	M J Leniston	13	0.09	
Majority		1,335	9.42	
Turnout		14,164	62.32	−21.07
Registered electors		22,725		
Social Credit gain from National		Swing		

=== 1975 election ===
1975 general election: Rangitikei
Party	Candidate	Votes	%	±%
National	Sir Roy Jack	7,631	47.27	−1.58
Social Credit	Bruce Beetham	5,875	36.39	+13.50
Labour	N R Pearce	2,263	14.02	−13.82
Values	Sally Throp	253	1.56	
Independent	D E Thurston	119	0.73	
Majority		1,756	10.87	−10.14
Turnout		16,141	83.39	−4.89
Registered electors		19,356		

=== 1972 election ===
1972 general election: Rangitikei
Party	Candidate	Votes	%	±%
National	Sir Roy Jack	7,060	48.85	
Labour	N R Pearce	4,023	27.84	
Social Credit	Bruce Beetham	3,309	22.89	
New Democratic	L J Weal	58	0.40	
Majority		3,037	21.01	
Turnout		14,450	88.28	+0.88
Registered electors		16,367		

=== 1969 election ===
1969 general election: Rangitikei
Party	Candidate	Votes	%	±%
National	Norman Shelton	9,077	57.62	+1.50
Labour	Dan Duggan	4,863	30.87	
Social Credit	T P Hills	1,378	8.74	
Country Party	A W Bartlett	434	2.75	
Majority		4,214	26.75	−3.72
Turnout		15,752	87.40	+1.18
Registered electors		18,021		

=== 1966 election ===
1966 general election: Rangitikei
Party	Candidate	Votes	%	±%
National	Norman Shelton	7,375	56.12	−3.01
Labour	Russell Wiseman	3,370	25.64	−1.24
Social Credit	J Smith	2,396	18.23	
Majority		4,005	30.47	−1.77
Turnout		13,141	86.22	−1.74
Registered electors		15,241		

=== 1963 election ===
1963 general election: Rangitikei
Party	Candidate	Votes	%	±%
National	Norman Shelton	7,898	59.13	+1.69
Labour	Russell Wiseman	3,591	26.88	
Social Credit	Francis Needham	1,867	13.97	+−0.15
Majority		4,307	32.24	+3.24
Turnout		13,356	87.96	−0.42
Registered electors		15,183		

=== 1960 election ===
1960 general election: Rangitikei
Party	Candidate	Votes	%	±%
National	Norman Shelton	7,701	57.44	+1.16
Labour	Shaun Cameron	3,812	28.43	
Social Credit	Francis Needham	1,894	14.12	+4.58
Majority		3,889	29.00	+6.86
Turnout		13,407	88.38	−3.51
Registered electors		15,169		

=== 1957 election ===
1957 general election: Rangitikei
Party	Candidate	Votes	%	±%
National	Norman Shelton	7,582	56.28	+1.64
Labour	Stephen Malcolm Roberton	4,601	34.15	−0.01
Social Credit	Francis Needham	1,286	9.54	
Majority		2,983	22.14	+1.67
Turnout		13,471	91.89	+1.32
Registered electors		14,659		

=== 1954 election ===
1954 general election: Rangitikei
Party	Candidate	Votes	%	±%
National	Norman Shelton	7,149	54.64	
Labour	Stephen Malcolm Roberton	4,470	34.16	
Social Credit	D McGregor	1,463	11.18	
Majority		2,679	20.47	
Turnout		13,082	90.57	+3.45
Registered electors		14,443		

=== 1951 election ===
1951 General election: Rangitikei
Party	Candidate	Votes	%	±%
National	Edward Gordon	8,163	64.53	+1.71
Labour	F A Dalzell	4,486	35.46	
Majority		3,677	29.06	+3.39
Turnout		12,649	87.12	−5.46
Registered electors		14,519		

=== 1949 election ===
1949 general election: Rangitikei
Party	Candidate	Votes	%	±%
National	Edward Gordon	8,101	62.82	+3.94
Labour	Eric De Malmanche	4,794	37.18	
Majority		3,310	25.67	+7.91
Turnout		12,892	92.58	+0.93
Registered electors		13,925		

=== 1946 election ===
1946 general election: Rangitikei
Party	Candidate	Votes	%	±%
National	Edward Gordon	7,647	58.88	
Labour	John Capstick	5,340	41.11	
Majority		2,307	17.76	
Turnout		12,987	91.65	
Registered electors		14,169		

=== 1931 election ===
1931 general election: Rangitikei
Party	Candidate	Votes	%	±%
Reform	Alexander Stuart	4,162	50.09	
Independent	James Thomas Hogan	4,147	49.91	
Majority		15	0.18	
Informal votes		23	0.28	
Turnout		8,332	82.39	
Registered electors		10,113		

=== 1928 election ===
1928 general election: Rangitikei
Party	Candidate	Votes	%	±%
Independent	James Thomas Hogan	4,628	51.96	
Reform	Billy Glenn	3,394	38.11	
Labour	F. Andrews	884	9.93	
Majority		1,234	13.86	
Informal votes		67	0.75	
Turnout		8,973	88.60	10,128
Registered electors				

=== 1909 by-election ===
1909 Rangitikei by-election: Second ballot
Party	Candidate	Votes	%	±%
Liberal	Robbie Smith	2,410	54.51	+29.26
Reform	Frank Hockly	2,011	45.49	+8.45
Majority		399	9.03	
Turnout		4,421		

1909 Rangitikei by-election: First ballot
Party	Candidate	Votes	%	±%
Reform	Frank Hockly	1,548	37.04	
Liberal	Robbie Smith	1,055	25.25	
Liberal	William Meldrum	903	21.61	
Independent	James Georgetti	340	8.14	
Liberal–Labour	Robert Hornblow	333	7.97	
Turnout		4,179		

=== 1899 election ===
1899 general election: Rangitikei
Party	Candidate	Votes	%	±%
Conservative	Frank Lethbridge	1,985	53.42	
Liberal	James Jervis Bagnall	1,453	39.10	
Independent Liberal	Edward Gascoigne	278	7.48	
Majority		532	14.32	
Turnout		3,716	66.25	
Registered electors		5,609		

=== 1892 by-election ===
1892 Rangitikei by-election
Party	Candidate	Votes	%	±%
Conservative	Robert Bruce	1,094	51.43	
Independent Liberal	Jack Stevens	1,033	48.57	
Majority		61	2.87	
Turnout		2,127		

=== 1890 election ===
1890 general election: Rangitikei
Party	Candidate	Votes	%	±%
Conservative	Douglas Hastings Macarthur	978	50.84	
Conservative	Francis Arkwright	946	49.16	
Majority		32	1.66	
Turnout		1,924	59.45	
Registered electors		3,236		

=== 1880 by-election ===
1880 Rangitikei by-election
Party	Candidate	Votes	%	±%
Independent	William Fox	233	54.82	
Independent	Donald Fraser	123	28.94	
Independent	Henry Lyon	69	16.24	
Majority		110	25.88	
Turnout		425		

=== 1876 election ===
1876 general election: Rangitikei
Party	Candidate	Votes	%	±%
Independent	John Ballance	201	61.28	+15.38
Independent	James Bull	127	38.72	
Majority		74	22.56	+19.70
Turnout		328	26.64	
Registered electors		1,231		

=== 1875 by-election ===
1875 Rangitikei by-election
Party	Candidate	Votes	%	±%
Independent	John Ballance	112	45.90	
Independent	William Hogg Watt	105	43.03	
Independent	George Hutchison	27	11.06	
Majority		7	2.86	
Turnout		244		
