= 10th New Zealand Parliament =

Meeting of the New Zealand Parliament

10th Parliament of New Zealand
←	9th Parliament	11th Parliament	→

Overview
- Legislative body: New Zealand Parliament
- Term: 6 October 1887 – 17 September 1890
- Election: 1887 New Zealand general election
- Government: Fifth Atkinson ministry

House of Representatives
- Members: 95
- Speaker of the House: Maurice O'Rorke
- Premier: Harry Atkinson
- Leader of the Opposition: John Ballance

Legislative Council
- Members: 49 (at start); 41 (at end)
- Speaker of the Council: William Fitzherbert

Sovereign
- Monarch: HM Victoria
- Governor: HE Rt. Hon. The Earl of Onslow from 2 May 1889 — HE Lt. Gen. Sir William Jervois until 23 March 1889

The 10th New Zealand Parliament was a term of the Parliament of New Zealand. Elections for this term were held in 4 Māori electorates and 91 European electorates on 7 and 26 September 1887, respectively. A total of 95 MPs were elected. Parliament was prorogued in October 1890. During the term of this Parliament, two Ministries were in power.

== Sessions ==
The 10th Parliament opened on 6 October 1887, following the 1887 general election. It sat for four sessions, and was prorogued on 3 October 1890.

Session	Opened	Adjourned
first	6 October 1887	23 December 1887
second	10 May 1888	30 August 1888
third	20 June 1889	17 September 1889
fourth	19 June 1890	17 September 1890

== Historical context ==
The Representation Act 1887 had major implication for the procedure of revising electoral boundaries. The revision task was transferred from committees formed by MPs to a permanent Representation Commission. The act specified that a country quota of 18% be applied to all designated districts that excluded boroughs with a population above 2,000 people, and that all electorates were to have the same nominal population within a tolerance of 750 people. It was also stipulated that electoral boundaries were to be reviewed after each New Zealand census.

In the 1887 electoral redistribution, although the Representation Commission was required through the Representation Act 1887 to maintain existing electorates "as far as possible", rapid population growth in the North Island required the transfer of three seats from the South Island to the north. Ten new electorates were created: Auckland Central, Woodville, Wellington South and Suburbs, Masterton, Wellington East, Waimea-Picton, Linwood, Rangitata, Waihemo, and Ponsonby. One former electorate, Wairarapa, was recreated.

Political parties had not been established yet; this only happened after the 1890 election. Anyone attempting to form an administration thus had to win support directly from individual MPs. This made first forming, and then retaining a government difficult and challenging.

== Ministries ==
The second Stout-Vogel Ministry had been in power since 3 September 1884 until 8 October 1887, just after the 1887 general election to determine the composition of the 10th Parliament. The fourth Atkinson Ministry, known as the Scarecrow Ministry, lasted for the remainder of the term until 24 January 1891.

== Initial composition of the 10th Parliament ==
95 seats were created across the electorates.

Electorate incumbent	Elected member defeated candidates	MP's term
Bay of Islands; Held by R Hobbs	Richard Hobbs	Fourth
Bay of Islands; Held by R Hobbs	2nd: John Lundon	Fourth
Marsden; Held by E Mitchelson	Robert Thompson	First
Marsden; Held by E Mitchelson	2nd: Joseph Dargaville	First
Rodney; Held by W Moat	William Moat	Second
Rodney; Held by W Moat	2nd: Jackson Palmer; 3rd: A Colbeck; 4th: J Hudson	Second
Waitemata; Held by R Monk	Richard Monk	Second
Waitemata; Held by R Monk	2nd: Reader Wood	Second
Eden; Held by J Tole	Edwin Mitchelson	Third
Eden; Held by J Tole	2nd: JA Connell	Third
Newton; Held by T Peacock	Edward Withy	First
Newton; Held by T Peacock	2nd: Joseph Tole; 3rd: HT Garrett	First
Ponsonby; New electorate	Thomas Peacock	Third
Ponsonby; New electorate	2nd: CS Wright; 3rd: E Cooper	Third
Auckland North; Held by T Thompson	Thomas Thompson	Second
Auckland North; Held by T Thompson	2nd:Samuel Vaile	Second
Auckland West; Held by J McM Dargaville	David Goldie	Second
Auckland West; Held by J McM Dargaville	2nd:John Shera; 3rd: Edward W. Morrison	Second
Auckland Central; New electorate	George Grey	Seventh
Auckland Central; New electorate	Unopposed	Seventh
Parnell; Held by FJ Moss	Frederick Moss	Fifth
Parnell; Held by FJ Moss	2nd:Seymour Thorne George	Fifth
Manukau; Held by GM O'Rorke	Maurice O'Rorke	Eighth
Manukau; Held by GM O'Rorke	2nd: SS Osborne	Eighth
Franklin North; Held by Frank Buckland	Frank Lawry	First
Franklin North; Held by Frank Buckland	2nd: Frank Buckland	First
Franklin South; Held by E Hamlin	Ebenezer Hamlin	Fifth
Franklin South; Held by E Hamlin	2nd: Benjamin Harris; 3rd: FB Kingsford	Fifth
Coromandel; Held by A Cadman	Alfred Cadman	Third
Coromandel; Held by A Cadman	2nd: J Mackay	Third
Thames; Held by W Fraser	William Fraser	Second
Thames; Held by W Fraser	2nd: James McGowan; 3rd: J Frater	Second
Waikato; Held by JB Whyte	John Blair Whyte	Fourth
Waikato; Held by JB Whyte	2nd: GW Russell	Fourth
Tauranga; Held by GB Morris	William Kelly	Second
Tauranga; Held by GB Morris	2nd: Richard John Gill; 3rd: H Kerr	Second
Waipa; Held by E Lake	William Jackson	Second
Waipa; Held by E Lake	2nd: JB Teasdale; 3rd: D Maxwell; 4th: T Campbell	Second
East Coast; Held by S Locke	Andrew Graham	First
East Coast; Held by S Locke	2nd: A McDonald; 3rd: MJ Gannon	First
Taranaki; Held by R Trimble	George Marchant	First
Taranaki; Held by R Trimble	2nd: Elliot; 3rd: R Trimble; 4th: T Kelly	First
New Plymouth; Held by O Samuel	Oliver Samuel	Second
New Plymouth; Held by O Samuel	2nd: Edward Smith; 3rd: Edward Dockrill	Second
Egmont; Held by HA Atkinson	Harry Atkinson	Eight
Egmont; Held by HA Atkinson	2nd: Felix McGuire	Eight
Wanganui; Held by J Ballance	John Ballance	Fifth
Wanganui; Held by J Ballance	2nd: Gilbert Carson	Fifth
Waitotara; Held by J Bryce	George Hutchinson	First
Waitotara; Held by J Bryce	2nd: John Bryce; 3rd: J Morgan	First
Napier; Held by JD Ormond	John Davies Ormond	Seventh
Napier; Held by JD Ormond	2nd: Joseph Ivess	Seventh
Hawkes Bay; Held by WR Russell	William Russell	Fourth
Hawkes Bay; Held by WR Russell	2nd: A Desmond	Fourth
Waipawa; Held by WC Smith	Thomas Tanner	First
Waipawa; Held by WC Smith	2nd:J Harker; 3rd:Fred Sutton; 4th: ARW Lascelles	First
Rangitikei; Held by RC Bruce	Robert Bruce	Second
Rangitikei; Held by RC Bruce	2nd: J Stevens; 3rd: F Arkwright	Second
Manawatu; Held by DH Macarthur	Douglas Macarthur	Second
Manawatu; Held by DH Macarthur	2nd: GL West	Second
Foxton; Held by J Wilson	James Wilson	Third
Foxton; Held by J Wilson	2nd: ES Thynne; 3rd: Sanson	Third
Woodville; New Electorate	William Smith	Third
Woodville; New Electorate	2nd: Horace Baker; 3rd: William Wilson McCardle	Third
Masterton; New Electorate	George Beetham	Fifth
Masterton; New Electorate	2nd: Alexander Hogg; 3rd: RS Hawkins	Fifth
Wairarapa; New Electorate	Walter Buchanan	Third
Wairarapa; New Electorate	2nd: Henry Bunny	Third
Hutt; Held by HS Fitzherbert	Henry Fitzherbert	Second
Hutt; Held by HS Fitzherbert	2nd: Thomas Mason	Second
Wellington South and Suburbs; New Electorate	Charles Izard	First
Wellington South and Suburbs; New Electorate	2nd: J Coombe	First
Thorndon; Held by A Newman	Alfred Newman	Third
Thorndon; Held by A Newman	2nd: William McLean	Third
Te Aro; Held by CJ Johnston	Andrew Stuart-Menteath	Second
Te Aro; Held by CJ Johnston	2nd: Francis Humphris Fraser	Second
Wellington East; New Electorate	George Fisher	Second
Wellington East; New Electorate	2nd: Robertson; 3rd: T Carter	Second
Nelson; Held by H Levestam	Henry Levestam	Fourth
Nelson; Held by H Levestam	2nd: Jesse Piper; 3rd: WB Gibbs	Fourth
Waimea-Picton; New Electorate	Arthur Seymour	Fourth
Waimea-Picton; New Electorate	2nd: Joseph Harkness; 3rd: Charles H. Mills	Fourth
Motueka; Held by R Hursthouse	John Kerr	Second
Motueka; Held by R Hursthouse	2nd: Richmond Hursthouse	Second
Buller; Held by EJ O'Conor	Eugene O'Conor	Third
Buller; Held by EJ O'Conor	2nd: John Munro	Third
Wairau; Held by H Dodson	Henry Dodson	Third
Wairau; Held by H Dodson	2nd: George Henderson; 3rd: Sutherland John Macalister	Third
Inangahua; Held by AA Stuart-Menteath	Richard Reeves	Third
Inangahua; Held by AA Stuart-Menteath	Unopposed	Third
Greymouth; Held by AR Guinness	Arthur Guinness	Second
Greymouth; Held by AR Guinness	2nd: Joseph Petrie	Second
Kumara; Held by R Seddon	Richard Seddon	Fourth
Kumara; Held by R Seddon	Unopposed	Fourth
Hokitika; Held by J Bevan	Joseph Grimmond	First
Hokitika; Held by J Bevan	2nd: John Bevan	First
Cheviot; Held by JD Lance	James Lance	Second
Cheviot; Held by JD Lance	2nd: J Macfarlane	Second
Ashley; Held by WF Pearson	William Pearson	Third
Ashley; Held by WF Pearson	2nd: RL Higgins; 3rd: JM Verrall	Third
Kaiapoi; Held by E Richardson	Edward Richardson	Sixth
Kaiapoi; Held by E Richardson	2nd: Richard Moore	Sixth
Avon; Held by L Harper	Edwin Blake	Second
Avon; Held by L Harper	2nd: Edward George Wright	Second
Linwood; New Electorate	Andrew Loughrey	First
Linwood; New Electorate	2nd: William Flesher; 3rd: Daniel Reese; 4th: JT Partridge	First
Heathcote; Held by F Jones	Frederic Jones	Second
Heathcote; Held by F Jones	2nd: JH Hopkins	Second
St Albans; Held By FJ Garrick	William Reeves	First
St Albans; Held By FJ Garrick	2nd: Francis James Garrick	First
Christchurch North; Held by J Vogel	Julius Vogel	Sixth
Christchurch North; Held by J Vogel	2nd: H Roberts	Sixth
Christchurch South; Held by J Holmes	Westby Perceval	First
Christchurch South; Held by J Holmes	2nd: A Ayers; 3rd: H Thomson; 4th: E George	First
Sydenham; Held by RM Taylor	Richard Taylor	Second
Sydenham; Held by RM Taylor	2nd: John Crewes	Second
Lyttelton; Held by H Allwright	John Joyce	First
Lyttelton; Held by H Allwright	2nd: H Allwright	First
Akaroa; Held by W Montgomery	Alexander McGregor	First
Akaroa; Held by W Montgomery	2nd: William Barnett; 3rd: George Armstrong; 4th: George Russell Joblin; 5th: Frederick Arthur Anson; 6th: John Edward Thacker	First
Lincoln; Held by AP O'Callaghan	Arthur O'Callaghan	Third
Lincoln; Held by AP O'Callaghan	2nd: Alfred Saunders; 3rd: John Davies Gilbert Enys	Third
Selwyn; Held by E Wakefield	John Hall	Sixth
Selwyn; Held by E Wakefield	2nd: John McLachlan	Sixth
Ashburton; Held by WC Walker	William Campbell Walker	Second
Ashburton; Held by WC Walker	2nd: Charles Purnell	Second
Rangitata; New Electorate	Searby Buxton	First
Rangitata; New Electorate	2nd: William Rolleston; 3rd: William Palmer	First
Timaru; Held by R Turnbull	Richard Turnbull	Fifth
Timaru; Held by R Turnbull	2nd: Edward George Kerr	Fifth
Gladstone; Held by JH Sutter	Arthur Rhodes	First
Gladstone; Held by JH Sutter	2nd: Jeremiah Twomey; 3rd: F Franks	First
Waimate; Held by WJ Steward	William Steward	Fourth
Waimate; Held by WJ Steward	2nd: John Manchester; 3rd: Charles G Clarke	Fourth
Waitaki; Held by TY Duncan	Thomas Duncan	Third
Waitaki; Held by TY Duncan	2nd: John Reid	Third
Oamaru; Held by TW Hislop	Thomas Hislop	Fourth
Oamaru; Held by TW Hislop	2nd: William Henry Frith; 3rd: John Church	Fourth
Waihemo; New Electorate	John McKenzie	Third
Waihemo; New Electorate	2nd: John Buckland	Third
Dunedin West; Held by WD Stewart	William Stewart	Fourth
Dunedin West; Held by WD Stewart	2nd: Thomas Dick	Fourth
Port Chalmers; Held by J Mills	James Mills	Second
Port Chalmers; Held by J Mills	2nd: James Green	Second
Dunedin East; Held by R Stout	James Allen	First
Dunedin East; Held by R Stout	2nd: Robert Stout	First
Dunedin Central; Held by T Bracken	Frederick Fitchett	First
Dunedin Central; Held by T Bracken	2nd: Edward Cargill	First
Dunedin South; Held by J Gore	Henry Fish	Second
Dunedin South; Held by J Gore	2nd: James Gore	Second
Roslyn; Held by AH Ross	Archibald Hilson Ross	Second
Roslyn; Held by AH Ross	2nd: William Hutchinson; 3rd: Walter Carlton	Second
Peninsula; Held by W Larnach	William Larnach	Fourth
Peninsula; Held by W Larnach	2nd: Thomas Begg	Fourth
Caversham; Held by W Barron	William Barron	Fourth
Caversham; Held by W Barron	2nd: Robert Rutherford	Fourth
Taieri; Held by J Fulton	James Fulton	Fourth
Taieri; Held by J Fulton	2nd: W Carncross	Fourth
Mount Ida; Held by S Mackenzie	Scobie Mackenzie	Second
Mount Ida; Held by S Mackenzie	2nd: Owen Hodge	Second
Bruce; Held by D Reid	Crawford Anderson	First
Bruce; Held by D Reid	2nd: Donald Reid	First
Tuapeka; Held by J Brown	James Brown	Seventh
Tuapeka; Held by J Brown	2nd: James Bennet	Seventh
Dunstan; Held by V Pyke	Vincent Pyke	Sixth
Dunstan; Held by V Pyke	Unopposed	Sixth
Clutha; Held by JW Thomson	Thomas Mackenzie	First
Clutha; Held by JW Thomson	2nd: James William Thomson	First
Waikaia; New electorate	Hugh Valentine	First
Waikaia; New electorate	2nd: Francis Wallace Mackenzie; 3rd: FS Canning	First
Mataura; Held by GF Richardson	George Richardson	Second
Mataura; Held by GF Richardson	2nd: James Mackintosh	Second
Hokonui; Held by C Cowan	Cuthbert Cowan	Third
Hokonui; Held by C Cowan	2nd: Alfred Baldey	Third
Wakatipu; Held by T Fergus	Thomas Fergus	Third
Wakatipu; Held by T Fergus	Unopposed	Third
Wallace; Held by H Hirst	Samuel Hodgkinson	Second
Wallace; Held by H Hirst	2nd: Henry Hirst; 3rd: John McIntyre; 4th: Theophilus Daniel	Second
Invercargill; Held by J Hatch	Henry Feldwick	Third
Invercargill; Held by J Hatch	2nd: Henry Jaggers; 3rd: Joseph Hatch; 4th: Cyril Tanner; 5th: John Walker Mitchell	Third
Awarua; Held by James Parker Joyce	Joseph Ward	First
Awarua; Held by James Parker Joyce	2nd: George Froggart; 3rd: James Walker Bain	First
Northern Maori; Held by W Katene	Sydney Taiwhanga	First
Northern Maori; Held by W Katene	2nd: Wi Katene; 3rd: Peotipi; 4th: Kereraru; 5th: Tomoro Kingi; 6th: Aratapu	First
Eastern Maori; Held by W Pere	James Carroll	First
Eastern Maori; Held by W Pere	2nd: Wi Pere; 3rd: Alfred Warbrick; 4th: Kereraru	First
Western Maori; Held by H Taipua	Hoani Taipua	
Southern Maori; Held by T Parata	Tame Parata	Second
Southern Maori; Held by T Parata	2nd: Thomas Ellison; 3rd: Kahu; 4th: Hōne Taare Tīkao	Second
