= John Ormond (farmer) =

New Zealand farmer, businessman, and politician (1905–1995)

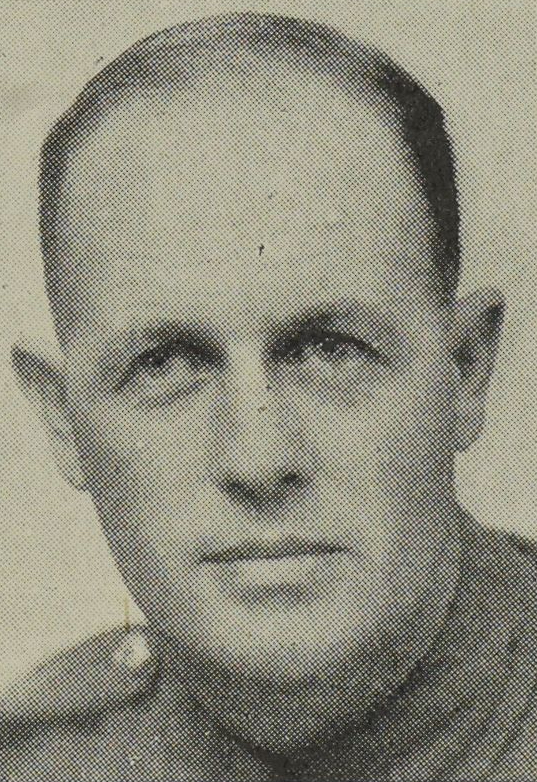
Ormond during World War II

Sir John Davies Wilder Ormond BEM JP (8 September 1905 – 8 March 1995) was a businessman and farmer from New Zealand.

Born to working class parents, Ormond became a sheep and cattle farmer in his early life. He became politically involved within the farming sector in the 1920s, gaining influence and expanding his scope of interest in the coming years. He was most well-known as a proponent of the New Zealand Legion, a radical conservative party. In 1935, he ran in Waipawa as a reformer, but ultimately lost due to splitting the vote of the right-wing parties. He also lost an election in 1938.

Ormond joined the New Zealand Army in the wake of World War II, winning several medals during his military career. After the war, he continued as an activist within New Zealand's meat industry up until his death.

== Early life and family ==
Born at Waipukurau, New Zealand, Ormond was the son of John Davies Ormond Jr, a station manager, and Emilie Mary Gladys Wilder. He was educated at Christ's College, New Zealand. His sports were tennis and rugby. He married Judith Wall on 26 August 1939. They had four sons and one daughter.

He was the grandson of John Davies Ormond and brother-in-law of the politician Sir Hugh John Dyke Acland. His great uncle was Edward John Eyre, former governor of Jamaica. His cousin is the headmistress, Ormond Felicity Lusk.

His son, John Davies (Johnny) Ormond, was also in politics as a founding member of ACT New Zealand. Johnny Ormond stood in Tukituki at the 1996, 1999, 2002 and 2005 elections, and in Napier at the 2008 and 2011 elections. His grandson, Johno Ormond, worked in parliamentary communications for the National Party and Tukituki MP Lawrence Yule from 2017 to 2020. He switched his affiliation and was named as the ACT candidate for Napier at the 2026 election.

== Political career ==
He started out with a large sheep and cattle run. Later he was elected to the Waipukurau Branch of the New Zealand Farmers' Union (1927–1930).

During the 1930s he "...was a leading proponent of the New Zealand Legion..." a radical, right-wing party, but when this proved ineffective he stood in the 1935 election, in the Waipawa electorate as an independent Reformer. He split the right vote, taking support from the official United/Reform Coalition candidate, Albert Jull. The Democrats also had a candidate, which further contributed to vote splitting on the right, and the electorate went to the Labour candidate, Max Christie.

In the 1938 election, he contested the Napier electorate for the National Party, but was beaten by the incumbent, Labour's Bill Barnard.

In 1935, he was awarded the King George V Silver Jubilee Medal.

== Wartime service ==
During World War II, he served in Greece, and received the British Empire Medal for diving off a troopship attempting to rescue a drowning man. Wounded in action he was invalided back to New Zealand, where he served as instructor and rose to the rank of army captain.

== Post-war career ==
After the war, he saw the need for New Zealand to ship products abroad. He was the longtime chairman of the New Zealand Meat Producers Board, beginning in 1951. In 1953, he was awarded the Queen Elizabeth II Coronation Medal. Subsequently, he organised the Shipping Corporation of New Zealand. He was its chairman until September 1979.

In his later life, Ormond retired to his cattle and sheep run. In the 1964 Queen's Birthday Honours, he was appointed a Knight Bachelor, in recognition of his role as chairman of the Meat Producers Board. In 1977, he was awarded the Queen Elizabeth II Silver Jubilee Medal. The Sir John Ormond Fellowship is named in his honour.
