= 1940 Waipawa by-election =

New Zealand by-election

- 16 November 1940
- Turnout: 8,136 (76.14%)

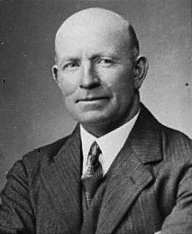
Candidate	Cyril Harker	Max Christie
Party	National	Labour
Popular vote	4,913	3,189
Percentage	60.64	39.36
MP before election
Albert Jull
National
Elected MP
Cyril Harker
National

The Waipawa by-election of 1940 was a by-election for the electorate of Waipawa held on 16 November 1940 during the 26th New Zealand Parliament. The by-election resulted from the death of the previous member Albert Jull on 24 September 1940.

== Background ==
The by-election was won by Cyril Harker, also of the National Party. The rural seat was usually safe for non-Labour parties, but in the 1935 general election had been won by Max Christie of the Labour Party. Christie lost the seat to the former holder Albert Jull in the 1938 general election.

== Results ==
The following table gives the election results:

1940 Waipawa by-election
Party	Candidate	Votes	%	±%
National	Cyril Harker	4,913	60.64	
Labour	Max Christie	3,189	39.36	−7.93
Majority		1,724	21.28	
Informal votes		34	0.42	−0.41
Turnout		8,136	76.14	−18.77
Registered electors		10,685		
National hold		Swing		
