= Thomas Tanner (New Zealand politician) =

New Zealand politician (1830–1918)

New Zealand Parliament
Years	Term	Electorate	Party
1887–1890	10th	Waipawa	Independent

Thomas Tanner (1830 – 22 July 1918) was a 19th-century Member of Parliament in New Zealand.

Born in Wiltshire, England, in 1830, Tanner arrived in New Zealand in 1850, and took up a large farm in Hawke's Bay in 1853.

Tanner was a member of the Hawke's Bay Provincial Council from 1867 to 1875. He represented the Hawkes Bay parliamentary electorate of Waipawa from 1887 to 1890, when he retired and William Cowper Smith was re-elected to the seat; Smith had held Waipawa until 1887, when he was elected for the new electorate of Woodville (which only existed from 1887 to 1890). He contested the 1893 election in the Hawke's Bay electorate and of the three candidates, he came last.

He died at Havelock North on 22 July 1918.

New Zealand Parliament
Preceded by William Cowper Smith	Member of Parliament for Waipawa; 1887–1890	Succeeded by William Cowper Smith
