= 1887 New Zealand general election =

General election in New Zealand

1887 general election
- 7 (Māori) & 26 (general) September 1887

All 95 seats in the New Zealand House of Representatives 48 seats were needed for a majority
- Turnout: 67.1%
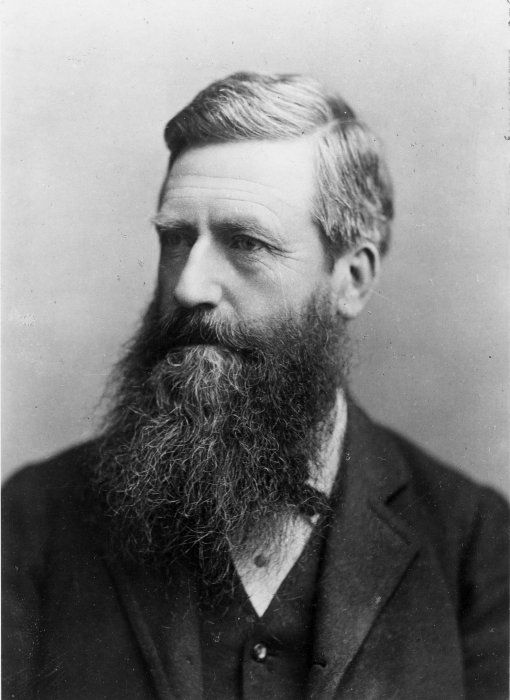

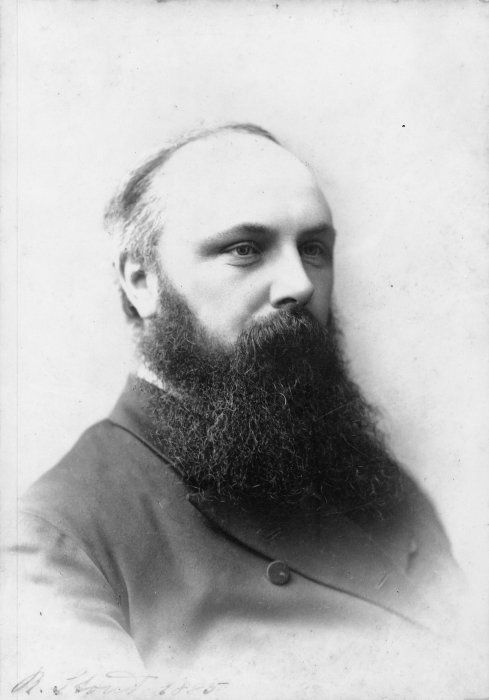
	First party	Second party
Leader	Harry Atkinson	Robert Stout
Party	Conservatives	Stout–Vogelites
Leader since	1883	1884
Leader's seat	Egmont	Dunedin East (lost seat)
Seats won	52	34
Seat change	▲20	▼23
Popular vote	N/A	N/A
Percentage	N/A	N/A
Swing	N/A	N/A
Premier before election
Robert Stout
Independent
Subsequent Premier
Harry Atkinson
Independent

The 1887 New Zealand general election was held on 26 September to elect 95 MPs to the tenth session of the New Zealand Parliament. The Māori vote was held on 7 September. 175,410 votes (67.1% turnout) were cast. In 5 seats there was only one candidate.

== 1887 electoral redistribution ==
The Representation Act 1887 had major implication for the procedure of revising electoral boundaries. The revision task was transferred from committees formed by MPs to a permanent Representation Commission. The act specified that a country quota of 18% be applied to all designated districts that excluded boroughs with a population above 2,000 people, and that all electorates were to have the same nominal population within a tolerance of 750 people. It was also stipulated that electoral boundaries were to be reviewed after each New Zealand census.

In the 1887 electoral redistribution, although the Representation Commission was required through the Representation Act 1887 to maintain existing electorates "as far as possible", rapid population growth in the North Island required the transfer of three seats from the South Island to the north. Ten new electorates were created: Auckland Central, Woodville, Wellington South and Suburbs, Masterton, Wellington East, Waimea-Picton, Linwood, Rangitata, Waihemo, and Ponsonby. One former electorate, Wairarapa, was recreated.

1887 was the year the Independent Representation Commission was established to redraw electorate boundaries after each five-yearly population census. The country quota was reduced to 18%. A £10 candidate's deposit was introduced.

== The Scarecrow ministry ==
The Stout-Vogel government had been soundly beaten. Only 34 returned members supported the government, whilst 52 opposition MPs were elected as well as nine independents. This led to much confusion in Wellington in September 1887 when the members gathered to form a government. John Bryce, William Rolleston and Robert Stout had all lost their seats. Sir John Hall said he was too old. Sir Julius Vogel's policies had been rejected by the voters.

So there was no alternative to Harry Atkinson, and after two weeks of negotiations he announced a ministry on 11 October. Only two ministers had served with him before. The Scarecrow ministry was not expected to last, but did.

The years 1887 and 1888 were the worst of the Long Depression, and Atkinson cut salaries, raised loans and raised customs duties. He was not popular with the wealthy, but they feared the Opposition leaders Grey and Ballance even more. By 1890 Atkinson was too ill to make speeches in the House.

== Results ==
The following table shows the results of the 1887 general election:

Key to affiliations

Stout-Vogelite Conservative Independent

Note that as the election was held before the establishment of formal political parties, the affiliation should only be regarded as an approximate indication of the division of political opinion.

Electorate results for the 1887 New Zealand general election
Electorate	Incumbent	Winner	Majority	Runner up
General electorates
Akaroa	William Montgomery	Alexander McGregor	330	William Barnett
Ashburton	William Campbell Walker		555	Charles Purnell
Ashley	William Pearson		239	Robert Luke Higgins
Auckland Central	New electorate	George Grey	Uncontested	
Auckland North	Thomas Thompson		35	Samuel Vaile
Auckland West	Joseph Dargaville	David Goldie	194	John Shera
Avon	Edwin Blake		342	Edward George Wright
Awarua	James Parker Joyce	Joseph Ward	259	George Froggart
Bay of Islands	Richard Hobbs		146	John Lundon
Bruce	Donald Reid	Crawford Anderson	31	Donald Reid
Buller	Eugene O'Conor		151	John Munro
Caversham	William Barron		230	Robert Rutherford
Cheviot	James Dupré Lance		297	Walter Macfarlane
Christchurch North	Sir Julius Vogel		523	Henry Roberts
Christchurch South	John Holmes	Westby Perceval	393	Aaron Ayers
Clutha	James Thomson	Thomas Mackenzie	336	James Thomson
Coromandel	Alfred Cadman		59	J Mackay
Dunedin Central	Thomas Bracken	Frederick Fitchett	170	Edward Cargill
Dunedin East	Sir Robert Stout	James Allen	29	Sir Robert Stout
Dunedin South	James Gore	Henry Fish	325	James Gore
Dunedin West	William Downie Stewart Sr.		13	Thomas Dick
Dunstan	Vincent Pyke		Uncontested	
East Coast	Samuel Locke	Andrew Graham	161	Allan McDonald
Eden	Joseph Tole	Edwin Mitchelson	436	J A Connell
Egmont	Harry Atkinson		110	Felix McGuire
Foxton	James Wilson		381	E S Thynne
Franklin North	Frank Buckland	Frank Lawry	32	Frank Buckland
Franklin South	Ebenezer Hamlin		29	Benjamin Harris
Gladstone	James Sutter	Arthur Rhodes	126	Jeremiah Twomey
Greymouth	Arthur Guinness		186	Joseph Petrie
Hawkes Bay	William Russell		406	Arthur Desmond
Heathcote	Frederic Jones		447	J H Hopkins
Hokitika	John Bevan	Joseph Grimmond	220	John Bevan
Hokonui	Cuthbert Cowan		56	Alfred Baldey
Hutt	Henry Fitzherbert		65	Thomas Mason
Inangahua	Stuart Menteath	Richard Reeves	Uncontested	
Invercargill	Joseph Hatch	Henry Feldwick	44	Henry Jaggers
Kaiapoi	Edward Richardson		116	Richard Moore
Kumara	Richard Seddon		Uncontested	
Lincoln	Arthur O'Callaghan		11	Alfred Saunders
Linwood	New electorate	Andrew Loughrey	368	William Flesher
Lyttelton	Harry Allwright	John Joyce	200	Harry Allwright
Manawatu	Douglas Macarthur		132	G L West
Manukau	Maurice O'Rorke		67	S S Osborne
Marsden	Edwin Mitchelson	Robert Thompson	405	Joseph Dargaville
Masterton	New electorate	George Beetham	268	Alexander Hogg
Mataura	George Richardson		127	James Mackintosh
Motueka	Richmond Hursthouse	John Kerr	141	Richmond Hursthouse
Mount Ida	Scobie Mackenzie		246	Owen Hodge
Napier	John Davies Ormond		58	Joseph Ivess
Nelson	Henry Levestam		239	Jesse Piper
Newton	Thomas Peacock	Edward Withy	95	Joseph Tole
New Plymouth	Oliver Samuel		364	Edward Smith
Oamaru	Thomas Hislop		236	William Henry Frith
Parnell	Frederick Moss		30	Seymour Thorne George
Peninsula	William Larnach		170	Thomas Begg
Ponsonby	New electorate	Thomas Peacock	12	C S Wright
Port Chalmers	James Mills		704	James Green
Rangitata	New electorate	Searby Buxton	45	William Rolleston
Rangitikei	Robert Bruce		224	Jack Stevens
Rodney	William Pollock Moat		149	Jackson Palmer
Roslyn	Archibald Hilson Ross		118	William Hutchison
Selwyn	Edward Wakefield	Sir John Hall	201	John McLachlan
St Albans	Francis Garrick	William Pember Reeves	164	Francis Garrick
Sydenham	Richard Molesworth Taylor		374	John Crewes
Taieri	James Fulton		7	Walter Carncross
Taranaki	Robert Trimble	George Marchant	47	J Elliot
Tauranga	Lawrence Grace	William Kelly	25	Richard John Gill
Te Aro	Francis Fraser	Stuart Menteath	159	Francis Fraser
Thames	William Fraser		178	James McGowan
Thorndon	Alfred Newman		448	William McLean
Timaru	Richard Turnbull		238	Edward Kerr
Tuapeka	James Brown		40	James Bennet
Waihemo	New electorate	John McKenzie	50	John Buckland
Waikaia	New electorate	Hugh Valentine	1	Francis Mackenzie (Note: Mackenzie was first on election night for Waikaia, but lost on a recount.)
Waikato	John Blair Whyte		155	George Russell
Waimate	William Steward		50	John Manchester
Waimea-Picton	New electorate	Arthur Seymour	2	Joseph Harkness
Waipa	Edward Lake	William Jackson	487	J B Teasdale
Waipawa	William Cowper Smith	Thomas Tanner	87	John Harker
Wairarapa	New electorate	Wally Buchanan	128	Henry Bunny
Wairau	Henry Dodson		66	George Henderson
Waitaki	Tom Duncan		29	John Reid
Waitemata	Richard Monk		373	Reader Wood
Waitotara	John Bryce	George Hutchinson	49	John Bryce
Wakatipu	Thomas Fergus		Uncontested	
Wallace	Henry Hirst	Samuel Hodgkinson	6	Henry Hirst
Wanganui	John Ballance		435	Gilbert Carson
Wellington East	New electorate	George Fisher	418	W Robertson
Wellington South and Suburbs	New electorate	Charles Izard	266	J Coombe
Woodville	New electorate	William Cowper Smith	161	Horace Baker
Maori electorates (Note: The affiliation of many of the Maori candidates is unknown or uncertain)
Eastern Maori	Wi Pere	James Carroll	186	Wi Pere
Northern Maori	Wi Katene	Sydney Taiwhanga	301	Wi Katene
Southern Maori	Tame Parata		37	Thomas Ellison
Western Maori	Hoani Taipua		624	Wiremu Te Wheoro

Table footnotes:
