= William Wilson McCardle =

New Zealand politician

The Honourable William Wilson McCardle
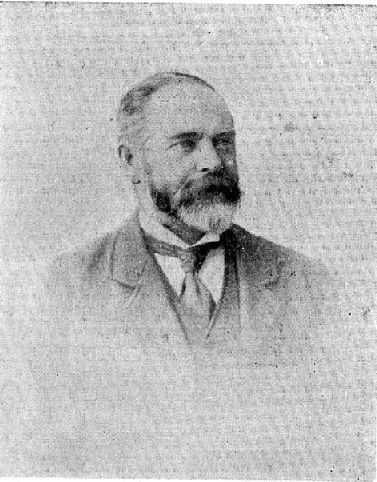
- William Wilson McCardle, ca 1890s

Member of the New Zealand Legislative Council
- In office 22 January 1907 – 21 January 1914

Personal details
- Born: 1 April 1844 Kirkcudbrightshire, Scotland
- Died: 4 January 1922 (aged 77) Walton, New Zealand
- Spouse: Janet Catherine Martin (m. 1866)

William Wilson McCardle JP (1 April 1844 – 4 January 1922) was a member of the New Zealand Legislative Council. Born in Scotland, he came to New Zealand as a young man and lived in a variety of places. He was a nurseryman and advocated for land reform. He established the town of Pahiatua and it was in the Wairarapa district that his local government involvement was most influential. He stood in a number of general elections for Parliament, but was never successful. A committed liberal politician, he was appointed to the Legislative Council by the first Ward Ministry in 1907 and served for one term until 1914.

== Biography ==
He was born in Kirkcudbrightshire, Scotland, in 1844, and was educated at the local grammar school. He lost his father early, and due to other misfortunes, he decided to emigrate to New Zealand. He arrived in Lyttelton on 28 January 1863 on the Chariot of Fame, with his occupation given as shepherd on the shipping list. He found employment as a shepherd on a station at Ashburton, where he stayed for two years. He was then for two years employed by John Greenaway, a Christchurch nurseryman, from whom he acquired gardening and orcharding skills.

In 1866 at Christchurch, McCardle married Janet Catherine Martin, daughter of Captain James Martin, master of the unfortunate coaster Margaret—a vessel built at Kaiwarra in the Wellington Harbour in 1845, and so completely lost on the way to Lyttelton in the following year that no trace of either ship or cargo was ever seen again. McCardle moved to Dunedin in 1869 and founded his own nursery, and some six years later sold out and established himself in the same line in Masterton. McCardle's apple orchard, stocked with its hundred fruit-bearing varieties, was soon the talk of the Wairarapa.

In 1881, he founded Pahiatua. There are conflicting accounts how the township came to its name, though. According to The Cyclopedia of New Zealand, it is Māori and means "The Home of the Gods". A different version is that McCardle named the township after his friend, the Māori chief Koneke Pahiatua. A third version is that another translation from Māori means "god's resting place", with the accompanying explanation that a chief fleeing from his enemies was led by his war god to this hill to seek refuge.

In 1884, McCardle moved to Pahiatua himself, and though he discontinued the nursery business, he had, at his homestead on the banks of the Mangahao River, an orchard of some twelve acres and a flower garden containing an extensive collection of Rhododendrons. He also had about 40 dairy cattle on his 180-acre farm, and the main portion of it was set apart as a stud sheep farm. His stud flock consisted of 300 Lincoln ewes.

He campaigned for land reforms, and is credited with having powerfully influenced the passing of the Land Act of 1877, and its amendment of 1879. As a member of the first Council of the borough of Masterton he did good work, and as a member of the Masterton Trust Lands Trust, he introduced the principle of full compensation for all permanent improvements effected by lessees of the trust property. As a trustee of the Masterton Park Trust he introduced the scheme for the laying out of the park, and himself carried it out. The park was renamed Queen Elizabeth Park in 1954.

For seven years, McCardle was a member of the Masterton School Committee, during which time he fought hard and successfully for the large new school which was at that time erected. As a member of the Wairarapa North County Council, McCardle, in company with George Beetham, represented the Alfredton riding, and got the county of Pahiatua formed into a separate riding of the Wairarapa North County, christening it 'Pahiatua'—a name which, correctly pronounced, is decidedly musical, and which in its meaning (it is Māori for 'The Home of the Gods') is also most poetic and classic. McCardle's next move in the founding of Pahiatua was to get the riding placed under the control of a Road Board, his efforts being acknowledged by his election to the position of first chairman. The next step was to form the county, when McCardle had the satisfaction of seeing fairly launched the scheme of special settlements which he had so consistently advocated and so successfully helped forward. As early as May 1876, McCardle explored the area of what became the county of Pahiatua; previously covered by dense bush, it was soon converted to farmland. Even then, as a member of the Wellington Waste Lands Board, he did all in his power to bring about the immediate settlement of the country he had explored. He introduced an association of some two hundred members, prepared to join in a special settlement scheme "on all fours" with the Acts subsequently passed in 1877 and 1879. In company with Alfred Renall of Masterton, McCardle waited on the Waste Lands Board, recommending the block as especially suitable for small farms settlements, and urging that it be set apart for these purposes. The Board, however, was deaf to all arguments at that time, stating that if the settlers wanted land they should be satisfied with second-class land instead of picking the best block in the province. But these settlers, led by McCardle, were not disposed to accept any but the best; they kept up the agitation until the Land Acts already mentioned were passed, and Pahiatua was the first block settled thereunder.

Though a leader in all this work of settlement, McCardle did not actually settle himself in Pahiatua until 1884, when he took up land and laid out the township. When the township of Pahiatua was laid out, there were many who thought the township would not develop. In response to a numerously signed petition he was appointed the first Justice of the Peace in the district. He continued work in land matters with the Masterton Special Settlements Association until the block known as Ballance was secured and disposed of.

Later, he moved to Kawhia. He was involved with the inaugural Kawhia County Council and was a member of the local Harbour Board. He then moved to Walton, where he lived for the rest of his live.

== Political career ==
Beyond his local political involvement, McCardle also stood for Parliament on several occasions. In the 1884 election, he contested the Wairarapa North against George Beetham, with Beetham winning by 542 to 517 votes. He contested the Woodville electorate in the 1887 election against William Cowper Smith and JH Baker and came third. Woodville, Baker and McCardle received 922, 761, and 452 votes, respectively. He did not contest the 1890 election, but stood again in 1893, when he came a distant last in the Masterton electorate against Alexander Hogg and Joseph Harkness. In the 1896 election, he was one of five candidates in the newly formed Pahiatua electorate. He came third, beaten by John O'Meara, who also stood for the Liberal Party.

In the 1905 election, he contested the Franklin electorate against William Massey. On 22 January 1907, McCardle was appointed to the Legislative Council. His seven-year term ended on 21 January 1914 and he was not reappointed.

== Family and death ==
His son, also called William Wilson McCardle, was Mayor of Pahiatua. He died in office on 23 October 1914. McCardle died on 4 January 1922 at Walton. He was survived by his wife, six sons and two daughters. McCardle was buried at Pahiatua. McCardle Road in Pahiatua is named after him.
