= 1887 Te Aro by-election =

New Zealand by-election

- 15 April 1887
- Turnout: 947 (43.48%)
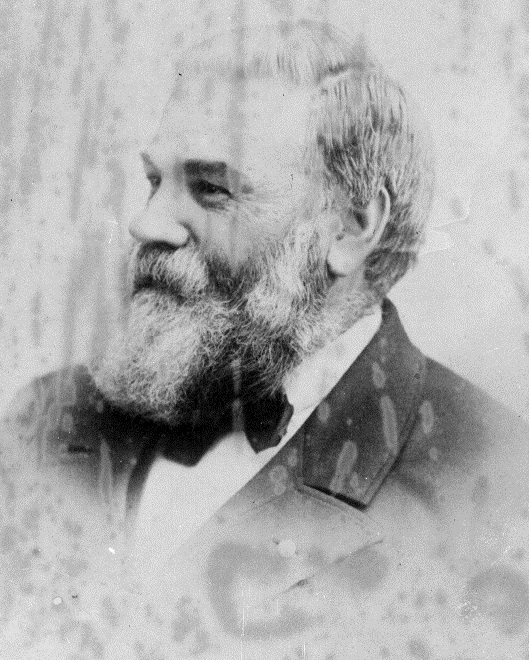

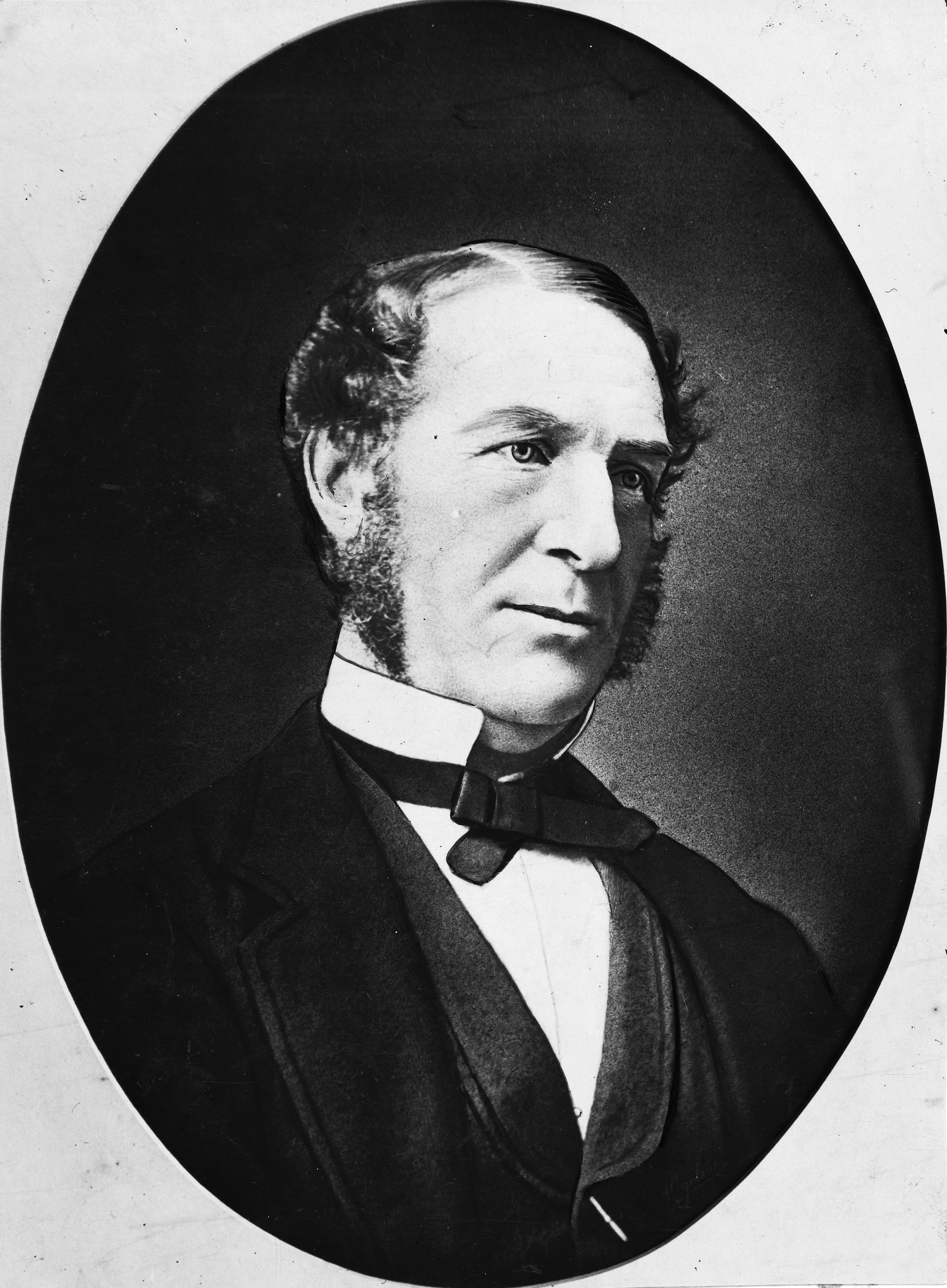
Candidate	Francis Fraser	William Travers
Party	Independent	Independent
Popular vote	506	346
Percentage	53.43	36.53
Member before election
Charles Johnston
Elected Member
Francis Fraser

The 1887 Te Aro by-election was a by-election held in the single-member Te Aro electorate during the 8th New Zealand Parliament, on 15 April 1887. The by-election was caused by the resignation of the incumbent MP Charles Johnston; who was replaced by Francis Humphris Fraser.

== Campaign ==
There were three declared candidates, all of whom professed to be supporters of the government to varying degrees. This was thought unusual as Johnston, the outgoing member, was an opposition member in the house.

Francis Fraser

Francis Fraser, an avowed supporter of the Stout–Vogel ministry, held his first meeting where he spoke on protectionism and advocated his preference for an income tax over a property tax.

Joseph Nancarrow

Joseph Nancarrow, the former Inspector of Machinery, declared himself a government supporter and was a moderate supporter of protectionism.

William Travers

William Travers stated support for the government but differed on protection as he was a free trader. Some papers were doubtful of Travers claim to support the government. One paper went as far as to claim he was the "champion political trickster of New Zealand" and his real allegiance was to the leader of the opposition Harry Atkinson.

Others

Both Joe Dransfield, the former Mayor of Wellington, and businessman John Blair were speculated as possible candidates. Edwin Jellicoe, a lawyer, declined nomination to stand thinking his policies were sufficiently similar to Travers. Thomas Tolley, a locksmith, declared himself a candidate supporting the government. He later withdrew the day before nominations closed.

== Results ==
1887 Te Aro by-election
Party	Candidate	Votes	%	±%
Independent	Francis Fraser	506	53.43	+17.03
Independent	William Travers	346	36.53	
Independent	Joseph Nancarrow	95	10.03	
Majority		160	16.89	
Turnout		947	43.48	
Registered electors		2,178		
