= Wellington Suburbs =

Wellington Suburbs may refer to:

- The suburbs of Wellington, New Zealand
- Wellington South and Suburbs, a former New Zealand electorate (1887–1890)
- Wellington Suburbs and Country, a former New Zealand electorate (1911–1919)
- Wellington Suburbs (New Zealand electorate), a former electorate (1893–1902, 1908–1911, 1919–1946)
