= Max Christie (disambiguation) =

Max Christie (born 2003) is an American basketball player.

Max Christie may also refer to:

- Max Christie (politician) (1889–1982), New Zealand politician
- Max Christie (footballer) (born 1971), Scottish professional footballer
