= Theophilus Cooper =

Theophilus Cooper may refer to:

- Theophilus Cooper (politician) (1827–1912), member of the New South Wales Legislative Assembly
- Theophilus Cooper (judge) (1850–1925), New Zealand compositor, lawyer and judge
