= George Hunter (politician, born 1859) =

New Zealand politician (1859–1930)

Sir George Hunter
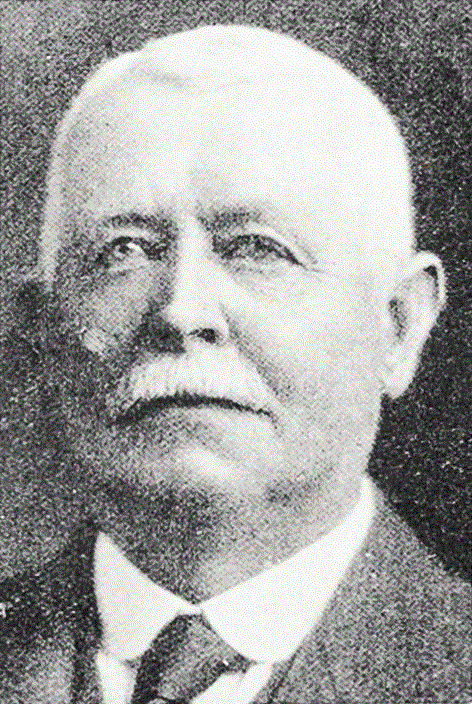
- George Hunter in c. 1930

Member of the New Zealand Parliament for Waipawa
- In office 7 December 1911 – 20 August 1930
- Preceded by: Charles Hall
- Succeeded by: Albert Jull
- In office 4 December 1896 – 6 December 1899
- Preceded by: Charles Hall
- Succeeded by: Charles Hall

Personal details
- Born: 1859 Wellington, New Zealand
- Died: 20 August 1930 (aged 70–71) Wellington, New Zealand
- Party: Reform
- Spouse: Edith May Munro
- Relations: George Hunter (father); George Hunter (grandfather)
- Children: one daughter
- Profession: Politician, farmer, breeder of race horses

Sir George Hunter (1859 – 20 August 1930) was a New Zealand politician of the Reform Party. Born in Wellington, he took over his father's large landholding in the Hawke's Bay at age 18. He was a breeder of sheep and race horses, with his horse Cynisca winning the Wellington Cup three times in a row. Hunter was prominent in local politics, and represented the Waipawa electorate in the House of Representatives for a total of 22 years.

== Farming and horse racing ==
Hunter was born in Wellington in 1859. He was a son of George Hunter, and a grandson of George Hunter, the first Mayor of Wellington. He worked on his father's farm in Te Aro, which is now part of the Wellington central business district. The central part of the land is now covered by Upper Dixon Street, Percival Street, and Macdonald Crescent.

His father had a further 15,000 acres (6,100 ha) farm in Porangahau in the Hawke's Bay Region, which he took up in circa 1854. Through purchasing neighbouring land, he increased the size to 32,000 acres (13,000 ha). As his father lived in Wellington, the Porangahau farm was run by his father's brothers David and William. Hunter junior took over the running of the farm from his uncles in 1877, and owned it in partnership with his brother Paul. Hunter lived at Porangahau for most of his life. The brothers bred Thoroughbreds at their farm, which won many prominent races. One of his most famous horses was Cynisca, which won three consecutive Wellington Cups. Like his father, Hunter was prominent in the administration of horse racing, and he submitted the Gaming Amendment Bill to Parliament. The brothers' partnership ended in 1908, with both taking half the land, George Hunter keeping the portion with the homestead.

== Political career ==
New Zealand Parliament
Years	Term	Electorate	Party
1896–1899	13th	Waipawa	Independent
1911–1914	18th	Waipawa	Reform
1914–1919	19th	Waipawa	Reform
1919–1922	20th	Waipawa	Reform
1922–1925	21st	Waipawa	Reform
1925–1928	22nd	Waipawa	Reform
1928–1930	23rd	Waipawa	Reform

Hunter was a member of Patangata County for over 30 years. He contested the Waipawa electorate in the 1890 election, but was beaten by William Cowper Smith. Smith had previously represented Waipawa from 1881 to 1887. In the 1893 election, Hunter was defeated by Charles Hall of the Liberal Party.

In the 1896 election, Hunter defeated Hall, but lost to him in the subsequent election, and again in the 1905 and 1908 elections.

Hall retired at the 1911 election, and Hunter beat Albert Jull of the Liberal Party. Hunter continued to serve in the parliament until his death in 1930, beating Jull in 1914 and 1919, John Joshua Langridge in 1922, William Ashton Chambers in 1925, and Ernest Albert Goodger (Independent United) and Douglas Barrington Kent (United Party) in 1928. Hunter's death on 20 August 1930 triggered the 1930 by-election in the Waipawa electorate, which was won by Albert Jull.

== Philanthropy ==
After World War I, Hunter gave land valued at NZ£30,000 for the settlement of returned soldiers.

== Family and death ==
On 23 February 1922, Hunter married for the first time. In a small circle of family and close friends, he married Edith May Munro (née Ford). They had a daughter, Elizabeth Hunter, on 1 May 1923.

Hunter was appointed a Knight Bachelor in the 1921 New Year Honours, the citation reading:

Has rendered valuable assistance in connection with the settlement of returned soldiers.

He fell ill during the first session of the 23rd Parliament in 1929, and was in indifferent health thereafter. He returned to Wellington for the second session in 1930 and died in Wellington on 20 August 1930, survived by his wife and one daughter. The funeral service was held at St Peter's Church in Wellington. The body was then taken by train to Waipukurau. His daughter died in 1999.

== Notes ==
New Zealand Parliament
Preceded by Charles Hall	Member of Parliament for Waipawa; 1896–1899; 1911–1930	Succeeded by Charles Hall
Preceded by Charles Hall	Member of Parliament for Waipawa; 1896–1899; 1911–1930	Succeeded by Albert Jull
