= Searby Buxton =

New Zealand politician

New Zealand Parliament
Years	Term	Electorate	Party
1887–1890	10th	Rangitata	Independent

Searby Buxton (20 February 1832 – 18 February 1919) was a 19th-century Member of Parliament in Canterbury, New Zealand and father of New Zealand politician Thomas Buxton.

He represented the Rangitata electorate from 1887 to 1890, when he was defeated in the Geraldine electorate by Arthur Rhodes. He represented the Liberal Opposition, and lost with 671 votes to Rhodes' 994, despite an Election Ballad eulogising him.
