= Cyril Harker =

New Zealand soldier, lawyer and politician

Cyril Geoffrey Edmund Harker OBE (17 November 1890 – 4 November 1970) was a New Zealand soldier, lawyer and politician of the National Party.

== Biography ==
New Zealand Parliament
Years	Term	Electorate	Party
1940–1943	26th	Waipawa	National
1943–1946	27th	Waipawa	National
1946–1949	28th	Hawkes Bay	National
1949–1951	29th	Hawkes Bay	National
1951–1954	30th	Hawkes Bay	National
1954–1957	31st	Hawkes Bay	National
1957–1960	32nd	Hawkes Bay	National
1960–1963	33rd	Hawkes Bay	National

Harker was born at Havelock North and attended Napier Boys' High School. He graduated in 1915 from the Victoria College (now Victoria University of Wellington) with an LLB. He served in World War I in the New Zealand Expeditionary Force departing 13 June 1918 and rising to the rank of Company Sergeant Major. He returned in August 1919 and in that year bought a share of the law partnership in Waipawa that is now McKay Mackie. He was Mayor of Waipawa and held offices in both the Returned Services Association and the Chamber of Commerce.

In 1936 and 1937 he represented the abortion care provider Isabel Annie Aves, who was tried four times for 'using an instrument with the intent to procure a miscarriage.' Neither the first trial in Napier in August 1936 nor the retrials in Wellington in October 1936, December 1936 and February 1937 resulted in the jury reaching a verdict. Harker's defence rested on lack of direct evidence; none of the women were gave evidence and the crown prosecutor relied on circumstantial evidence. In 1938 he also defended Colin Herbert Hercock who shot Aves after her return to the Hawkes Bay, getting him convicted of the lesser charge of manslaughter rather than murder and subsequently getting his prison term reduced.

He represented the Hawke's Bay electorates of Waipawa from a 1940 by-election to 1946, and then Hawke's Bay from 1946 to 1963, when he retired. His maiden speech to the house concerned the Small Farms Amendment Bill which dealt with the settlement and rehabilitation of returned soldiers. He was Chairman of Committees from 1950 to 1957.

In 1953, Harker was awarded the Queen Elizabeth II Coronation Medal. In the 1964 Queen's Birthday Honours, he was appointed an Officer of the Order of the British Empire for public services.

Harker died on 4 November 1970.

== Notes ==
Political offices
Preceded by Clyde Carr	Chairman of Committees of the House of Representatives; 1950–1957	Succeeded by Reginald Keeling
New Zealand Parliament
Preceded by Albert Jull	Member of Parliament for Waipawa; 1940–1946	Electorate abolished
Preceded by Ted Cullen	Member of Parliament for Hawkes Bay; 1946–1963	Succeeded by Richard Harrison
