= Hugh McIntyre (farmer) =

Farmer, freezing company chairman (1888–1982)

Hugh McIntyre OBE MM
- Born: Hugh Pearson McIntyre; 12 October 1888; Waikaka Valley, Southland, New Zealand
- Died: 21 September 1982 (aged 93); Invercargill, New Zealand
- Occupation: Farmer
- Known for: Co-founder of Alliance Freezing Company (Southland) Limited (1948)

Hugh Pearson McIntyre OBE MM (12 October 1888 – 21 September 1982) was a New Zealand farmer and freezing company chairman. He was born in the Waikaka Valley, Southland, New Zealand, on 12 October 1888. He was one of the founders of the Alliance Freezing Company (Southland) in 1948.

During World War I, McIntyre saw active service in Egypt and France, and he was awarded the Military Medal for gallantry in the field.

In the 1964 Queen's Birthday Honours, McIntyre was appointed an Officer of the Order of the British Empire, for services to local government and to farming.
