= Hugh Whitehead (scientist) =

New Zealand scientist and administrator (1899–1983)

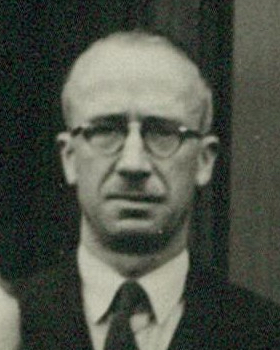
Whitehead in 1948

Hugh Robinson Whitehead OBE (11 November 1899 – 13 March 1983) was a New Zealand biochemist, microbiologist and scientific administrator. He was born in Leeds, Yorkshire, England, in 1899. He was the director of the Dairy Research Institute in Palmerston North, which is now the Fonterra Research and Development Centre.

== Career ==
Between 1933 and 1935, Whitehead and his colleagues identified a bacteriophage as the cause of failure in cheese starter isolates, which had significant, positive commercial outcomes for the New Zealand dairy industry.

== Awards ==
In the 1964 Queen's Birthday Honours, Whitehead was appointed an Officer of the Order of the British Empire.
