= Linwood (New Zealand electorate) =

Linwood was a parliamentary electorate in Christchurch, New Zealand, from 1887 to 1890. The electorate was represented by one Member of Parliament, Andrew Loughrey.

== Population centres ==
In the 1887 electoral redistribution, although the Representation Commission was required through the Representation Act 1887 to maintain existing electorates "as far as possible", rapid population growth in the North Island required the transfer of three seats from the South Island to the north. Ten new electorates were created, including Linwood, and one former electorate was recreated.

The electorate was based on the suburb of Linwood. Polling booths for the election were located in Phillipstown and Richmond.

== History ==
The Linwood electorate was formed for the 1887 election, which determined the composition of the 10th Parliament.

The electorate was represented by one Member of Parliament, Andrew Loughrey. The 1887 election was contested by Loughrey, William Flesher (father of James Arthur Flesher), Daniel Reese and J. T. Partridge. Loughrey, Flesher, Reese and Partridge received 699, 331, 270 and 15 votes, respectively.

Loughrey remained a member during the term of the term of the 10th Parliament. The Linwood electorate was abolished in 1890.

=== Election results ===
Key

Independent

Election	Winner
1887 election	Andrew Loughrey
