= Stuart Menteath =

New Zealand barrister and politician (1853–1916)

Andrew Agnew Stuart Menteath (1853 – 25 September 1916) was a 19th-century Member of Parliament, first from Westland and then from Wellington. He was a barrister by profession.

== Early life ==
Menteath was born in 1853 in Edinburgh. He was descended from the Stuart-Menteth baronets, but his last name was Menteath. He received his education in France, Spain, and Italy, and was fluent without an accent in French. He was studying towards a law degree at the University of Edinburgh, but did not finish due to health concerns, which let him to move to New Zealand during the 1870s via the Himalaya. His name is first mentioned in New Zealand newspapers in December 1876.

== Professional life ==
Menteath became a bank manager at the Blenheim branch of the National Bank soon after his arrival in the country. He soon transferred to the West Coast of the South Island to manage branches there. With his health having improved by 1880, he returned to Edinburgh to continue his legal studies. He was called to the bar at the Middle Temple in April 1883.

Menteath returned to New Zealand and practised as a barrister at Greymouth and Reefton. After he had moved to Wellington, he was a partner with Edwin Jellicoe at Jellicoe and Menteath, and later partnered with Oswald Beere, and then with Frederick Ward. Menteath was for a time the president of the Wellington Law Society.

== Political career ==
New Zealand Parliament
Years	Term	Electorate	Party
1884–1887	9th	Inangahua	Independent
1887–1890	10th	Te Aro	Independent

Menteath represented the Inangahua electorate from 1884 to 1887, having beaten Richard Reeves by 746 votes to 727. During 1886, he moved to Wellington. In the 1887 election, he contested the Te Aro electorate against Francis Humphris Fraser and was successful. He retired at the 1890 election.

== Family and death ==
Menteath was married twice. He had two daughters and one son from his first marriage. His eldest daughter was married to his chief clerk, Charles G. Allen. Her sister served as a nurse with the British Forces in WWI. His son, Charles Menteath, was killed in action in Gallipoli. He had two further daughters and one son from his second marriage.

Menteath died in Wellington on 25 September 1916 from heart failure.

New Zealand Parliament
Preceded by Edward Shaw	Member of Parliament for Inangahua; 1884–1887	Succeeded by Richard Reeves
