= 1964 Birthday Honours (New Zealand) =

Awards list for New Zealand

The 1964 Queen's Birthday Honours in New Zealand, celebrating the official birthday of Elizabeth II, were appointments made by the Queen on the advice of the New Zealand government to various orders and honours to reward and highlight good works by New Zealanders. They were announced on 13 June 1964.

The recipients of honours are displayed here as they were styled before their new honour.

== Knight Bachelor ==
- The Honourable Ronald Macmillan Algie – Speaker of the House of Representatives.
- John Davies Wilder Ormond BEM JP – chairman of the New Zealand Meat Producers Board.
- Carl Victor Smith CBE – of Dunedin. For public services.
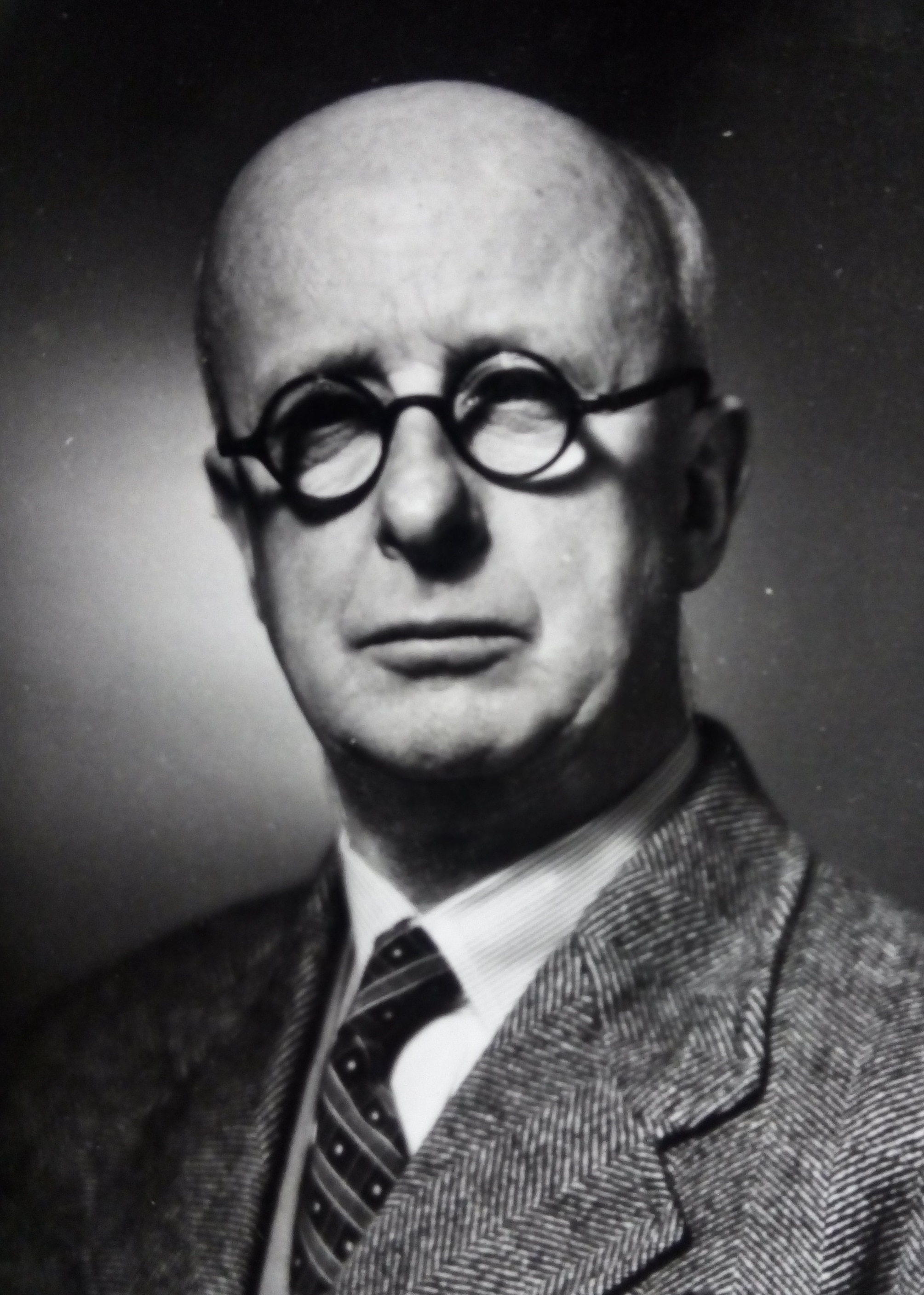
Sir Ronald Algie

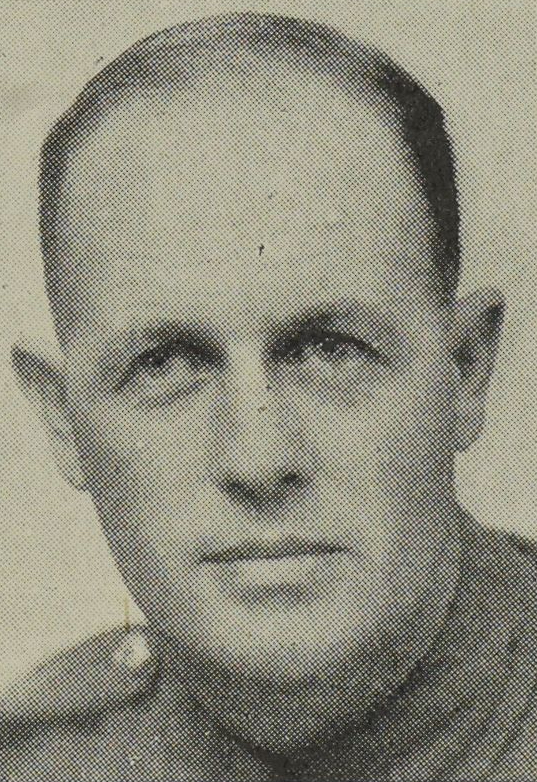
Sir John Ormond

== Order of Saint Michael and Saint George ==
=== Companion (CMG) ===
- Thomas Frederick Corkill MC MD FRCP – senior obstetrician in Wellington.
- Jack Kent Hunn – permanent head, Ministry of Defence.

== Order of the British Empire ==
=== Knight Commander (KBE) ===
Military division

- Rear Admiral Peter Phipps CBE DSC VRD – Royal New Zealand Navy.
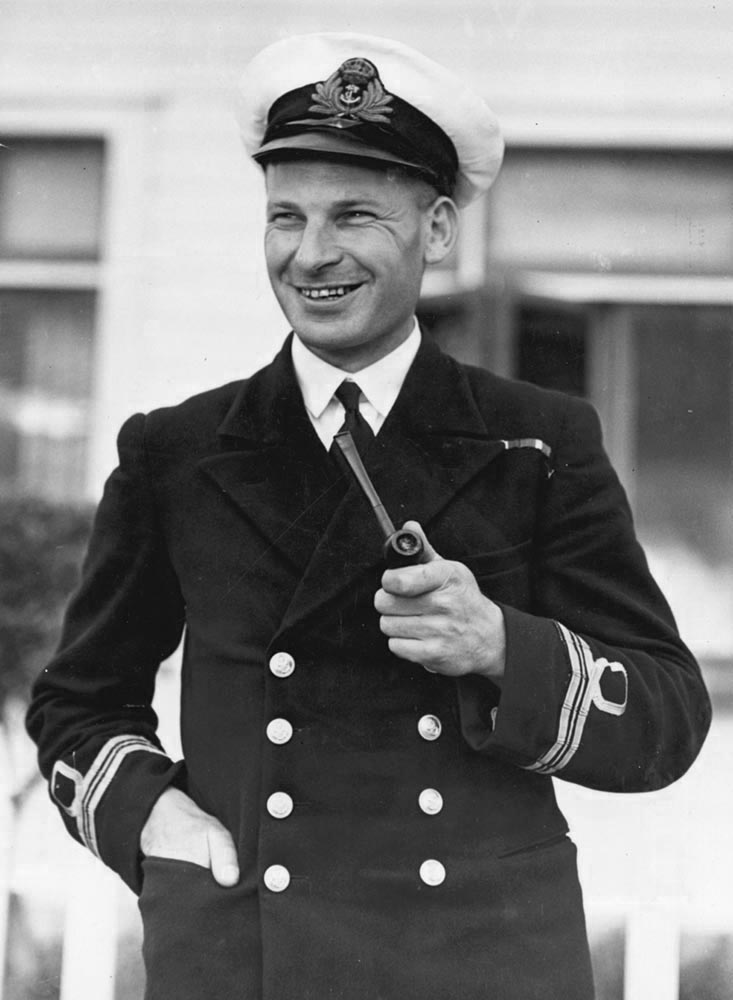
Sir Peter Phipps

=== Commander (CBE) ===
Civil division

- Ian Burman Gow JP – of Bay of Plenty. For services to the dairy industry.
- John Faulks Landreth ChB FRCP – of Christchurch. For services to the medical profession.
- James Hislop Parker MM – of Raumati South. For services to the fruit industry.
- Norman Berridge Spencer – of Auckland. For services in the fields of philanthropy and community welfare.

Military division

- Captain John O'Connell Ross – Royal New Zealand Navy.
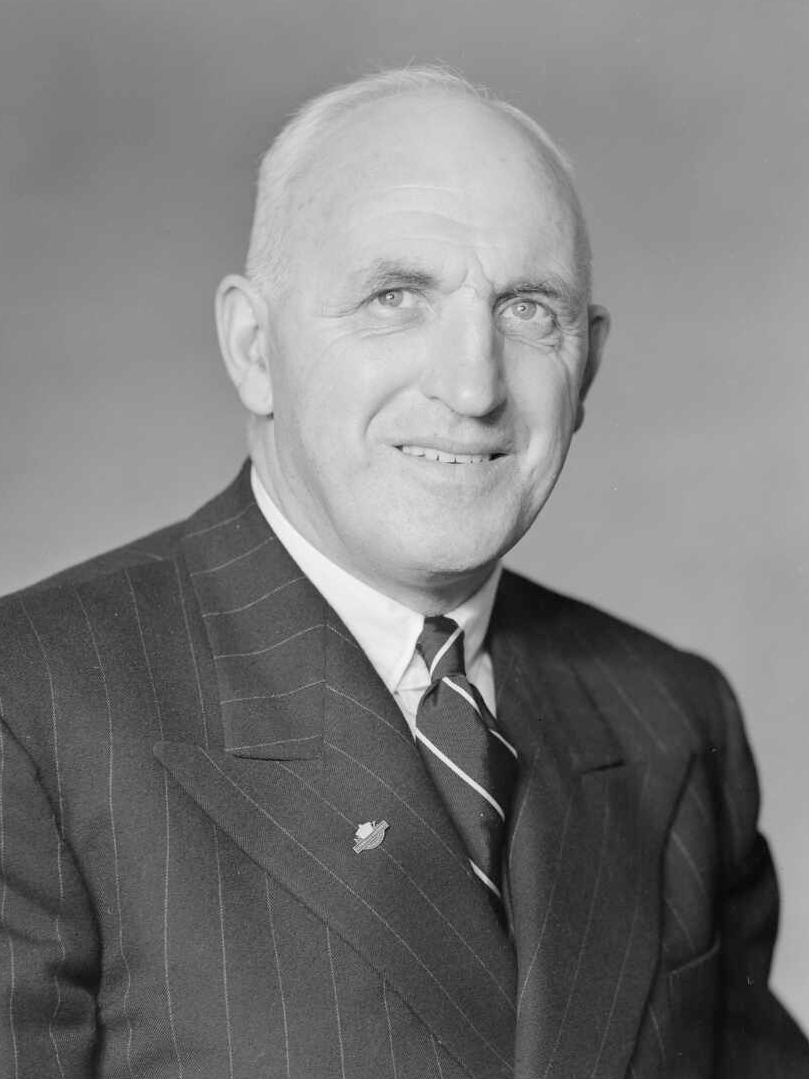
Jim Parker

=== Officer (OBE) ===
Civil division

- Eric Tewsley Dawson MB ChB – lately superintendent of the Bay of Plenty Hospital Board.
- Charles Jackson Garland – of Auckland. For public services.
- Maurice William Grantham JP. For community welfare services, especially as secretary of the Southland Old People's Welfare Council.
- Cyril Geoffrey Edmund Harker – of Waipawa. For public services.
- Hugh Pearson McIntyre MM – of Gore. For services to local government and to farming.
- Matina Makiha – of Whakarewarewa. For services to the Māori people.
- Denis Rogers ED MB ChB – mayor of Hamilton.
- William Henry Gray Russell Sarney JP – of Ashburton. For services to the community and to sport.
- Irene Tolerton – matron-in-chief. Wellington Public Hospital.
- William Simon Wauchop – of Wellington. For services to art, drama and librarianship.
- Hugh Robinson Whitehead – director of the Dairy Research Institute, Massey University College, Palmerston North.

Military division

- Commander Morris Aaron Lawson – Royal New Zealand Navy.
- Lieutenant-Colonel Peter Hulbert Glenn Hamilton – Royal New Zealand Engineers (Regular Force).
- Group Captain Kenneth William Trigance DFC – Royal New Zealand Air Force.
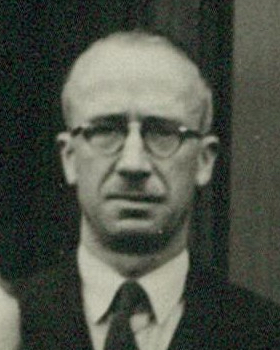
Hugh Whitehead

=== Member (MBE) ===
Civil division

- Joseph Allan JP – of Lake Pukaki. For services to local government and to farming.
- Catherine Raincliff Ashton – of Auckland. For services to the community, particularly in the interests of children and the elderly.
- Edmund Peter Cahill – deputy superintendent, Paparua Prison, Christchurch.
- Rebecca Noble-Campbell – of Wairoa. For services to the community, especially in connection with the welfare of women.
- Emily Bessie Cannell – of New Plymouth. For services to education and child welfare.
- The Reverend Robert Lye Challis – minister in New Zealand in charge of the welfare of Pacific Islanders.
- Gertrude Charlotte Dunn JP – of Lower Hutt. For services to the community.
- Walter James Egington – of Motueka. For services to local government.
- The Reverend Archibald Macfarlane Elliffe – superintendent of the Otago Presbyterian Social Services Association.
- Alister Hay Goyder – of Blenheim. For services to local government.
- George Andrew Holmes – superintendent of the Invermay Research Station.
- The Reverend Mutu Paratene Kapa – of Tuakau. For services to the Māori people.
- Clark McConachy – of Auckland. For community and charitable services.
- Margaret Kate McCorkindale. For social welfare services, especially in connection with the Feilding Plunket Society.
- Roland Keith Milne – of Christchurch. For services to the community in educational and welfare fields.
- Albert Edward Naulls BEM. For services to Government House, Wellington.
- James Joseph Hamilton Nisbet JP – of Hikurangi. For services to the community, especially in connection with the Returned Services' Association.
- Kenneth James Strange JP – of Nelson. For services to the community, especially in connection with the Returned Services' Association.
- Michael Joseph Sullivan JP – of Westland. For services to local government and community welfare.
- John Leddra Wallis – chairman of the Otorohanga County Council.

Military division

- Temporary Lieutenant Commander (SP) Allyn Mason Finlayson – Royal New Zealand Naval Volunteer Reserve.
- Major William Alexander French ED – New Zealand Scottish Regiment (Territorial Force).
- Major Peter William Frank Joplin – Royal Regiment of New Zealand Artillery (Regular Force).
- Warrant Officer First Class Henry George Charles Salt – Royal Regiment of New Zealand Artillery (Regular Force).
- Major Lloyd James Sanders – Royal New Zealand Infantry Regiment (Regular Force).
- Squadron Leader Geoffrey Bentley – Royal New Zealand Air Force.
- Squadron Leader James Dermot Hurley – Royal New Zealand Air Force.

== Companion of the Imperial Service Order (ISO) ==
- Keith Menzies – lately Assistant Secretary of Justice.
- David Archibald Wraight – lately Navy Secretary.

== British Empire Medal (BEM) ==
Civil division, for gallantry

- John Isaac Beardsley – constable, New Zealand Police Force. For arresting an armed and intoxicated criminal.

Civil division

- Ernest David Fraser – sergeant, New Zealand Police Force.

Military division

- Chief Petty Officer Cook (O) Keith Lionel Mack – Royal New Zealand Navy.
- Chief Ordnance Artificer Arthur Hamilton Norris – Royal New Zealand Navy.
- Stores Chief Petty Officer Selwyn Desmond Walter – Royal New Zealand Navy.
- Chief Radio Supervisor Anthony James Edmond Woolford – Royal New Zealand Naval Volunteer Reserve.
- Sergeant Ruth Gertrude Kirton – New Zealand Women's Royal Army Corps (Regular Force).
- Sergeant Ronald William Rowe – Royal New Zealand Infantry Regiment.
- Flight Sergeant Alan Peter Longley – Royal New Zealand Air Force.
- Flight Sergeant Henry Dickson Richmond – Royal New Zealand Air Force.

== Air Force Cross (AFC) ==
- Squadron Leader Russell George Archer – Royal New Zealand Air Force.
- Flight Lieutenant Murray Davis Peacock – Royal New Zealand Air Force.
- Master Engineer David John Abercromby BEM – Royal New Zealand Air Force.

== Queen's Police Medal (QPM) ==
- William Raymond Fell – assistant commissioner, New Zealand Police Force.

== Queen's Commendation for Valuable Service in the Air ==
- Master Signaller Michael Patrick Joseph Phillips – Royal New Zealand Air Force.
