= William Pollock Moat =

New Zealand politician

New Zealand Parliament
Years	Term	Electorate	Party
1884–1887	9th	Rodney	Independent
1887–1890	10th	Rodney	Independent

William Pollock Moat (1827 – 24 March 1895) was a 19th-century Member of Parliament from Auckland, New Zealand.

Pollock represented the Warkworth electorate in the Auckland Provincial Council from 18 November 1873 until the abolition of provincial government on 31 October 1876.

Pollock represented the Rodney electorate from 1884 to 1890, when he retired.

Aged 68, Pollock died in Parnell on 24 March 1895. He was buried, with masonic rites, at Purewa Cemetery.
