= 1930 Waipawa by-election =

New Zealand by-election

- 8 October 1930
- Turnout: 7,197
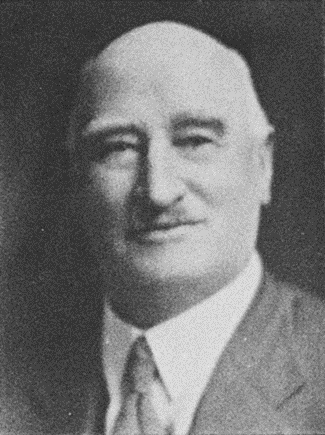

Candidate	Albert Jull	William Tucker
Party	United	Reform
Popular vote	3,747	3,450
Percentage	52.06	47.93
Member before election
George Hunter
Reform
Elected Member
Albert Jull
United

The Waipawa by-election of 1930 was a by-election for the rural Hawke's Bay electorate of Waipawa held on 8 October of that year during the 23rd New Zealand Parliament. The by-election resulted from the death of the previous member George Hunter of the Reform Party on 20 August.

It was held on the same day as another by-election in Western Maori.

== Candidates ==
The by-election was won by Albert Jull, of the United Party. Jull had previously contested the seat unsuccessfully in 1911, 1914 and 1919 for United's predecessor, the Liberal Party. The rural seat was usually safe for the rural-focused Reform Party. Reform chose William Tucker from Clive as their candidate, although he was unsuccessful.

== Result ==
The following table gives the election results:

1930 Waipawa by-election
Party	Candidate	Votes	%	±%
United	Albert Jull	3,747	52.06	
Reform	William Tucker	3,450	47.93	
Majority		297	4.12	
Turnout		7,197		
United gain from Reform		Swing		
