= Annie Aves =

New Zealand abortion provider

Isabel Annie Aves (née Michaelsen) (18 March 1887–15 October 1938) was a New Zealand abortion provider.

== Biography ==
She was born in Waipawa, Hawke's Bay, New Zealand on 18 March 1887. Aves provided abortion services from her home in Napier using sea-tangle tents (probably Laminaria digitata seaweed stalks or a local substitute) which, when inserted into the cervical canal, absorbed water and slowly expanded, dilating the cervix and leading to a miscarriage.

Her first trial was in Napier on a charge of "unlawfully using an instrument with intent to procure a miscarriage", but the jury could not agree on a verdict. Two further trials were held in Wellington, with the juries again failing to agree on a verdict, amid much publicity. An unusual fourth trial followed, which also resulted in no conviction. Aves was represented by Cyril Harker at the trials in Napier in August 1936, Wellington in October 1936, December 1936 and February 1937. Harker's defense rested on lack of direct evidence; none of the women gave evidence and the crown prosecutor relied on circumstantial evidence.

In 1938, Aves was shot with a rifle by Colin Herbert Hercock, the fiancé of a woman she had performed an abortion on, after he was led to believe that his fiancée was going to die as a result of the abortion. Aves died later in hospital; the fiancée survived to give evidence at Hercock's trial. Harker defended Hercock, getting him off on the lesser charge of manslaughter rather than murder and subsequently getting his prison term reduced. The judge in Hercocks' trial was Michael Myers, who had presided over Aves's previous trial. During the trial, he said: "If Annie Aves had been dealt with as she should have been, this tragedy would not have happened".

== See also ==
- Abortion in New Zealand
