= Bill Fell =

William Raymond Fell QPM (26 October 1904 – 12 November 1986) was a New Zealand police officer. He was born in Melksham, Wiltshire, England, on 26 October 1904.

In the 1964 Queen's Birthday Honours, Fell was awarded the Queen's Police Medal for Distinguished Service.
