= Andrew Loughrey =

New Zealand politician

Andrew Loughrey (1844 – 24 September 1913) was a New Zealand Member of Parliament from Christchurch.

== Biography ==
New Zealand Parliament
| Years | Term | Electorate | Party |
|---|---|---|---|
| 1887–1890 | 10th | Linwood | Independent |

Loughrey was born in Melbourne and educated at Melbourne University College in law. He worked as a barrister and solicitor at the Supreme Court of Victoria. He later became an Inspector of Schools for the Victorian Education Department.

Loughrey emigrated to Christchurch in 1880. He formed the law firm 'Holmes and Loughrey' with John Holmes, which was succeeded by 'Loughrey and Lane' in January 1890 (with Beauchamp Lassetter Lane) upon Holmes' retirement before Loughrey practised on his own.

He represented the Linwood electorate from 1887 when he defeated Dan Reese, to 1890 when he retired. He was a supporter of the Stout–Vogel Ministry.

Loughrey died on 24 September 1913.

New Zealand Parliament
| New constituency | Member of Parliament for Linwood; 1887–1890 | Constituency abolished |
