= 1921 New Year Honours (New Zealand) =

Annual awards for New Zealanders

The 1921 New Year Honours in New Zealand were appointments by King George V on the advice of the New Zealand government to various orders and honours to reward and highlight good works by New Zealanders. The awards celebrated the passing of 1920 and the beginning of 1921, and were announced on 1 January 1921.

The recipients of honours are displayed here as they were styled before their new honour.

== Knight Bachelor ==
- The Honourable Theophilus Cooper – a judge of the Supreme Court.
- George Hunter MP – member of the House of Representatives. Has rendered valuable assistance in connection with the settlement of returned soldiers.
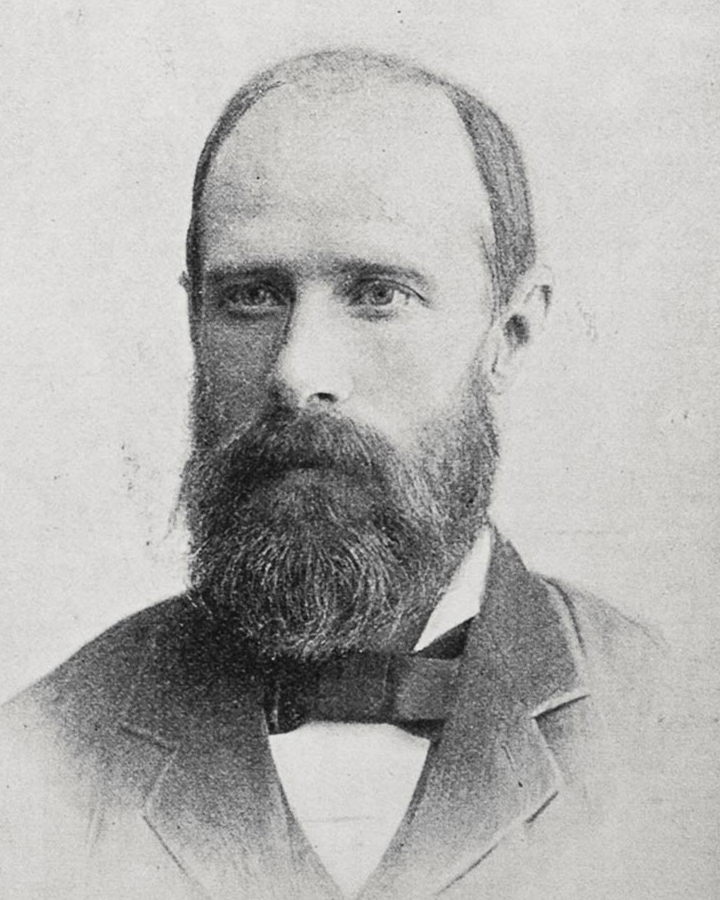
Sir Theophilus Cooper

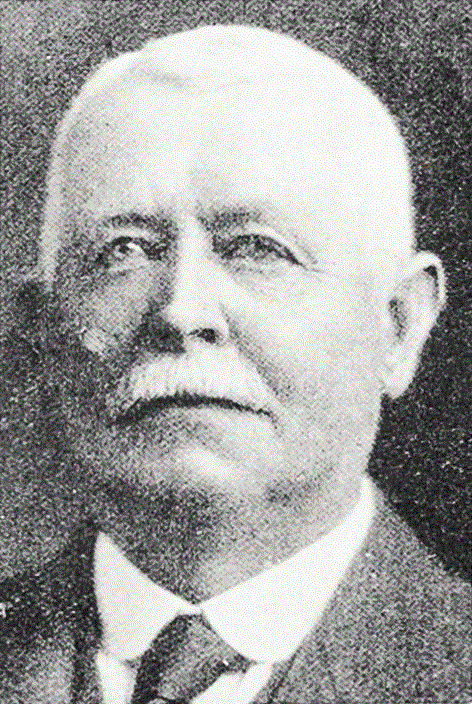
Sir George Hunter

== Order of Saint Michael and Saint George ==
=== Companion (CMG) ===
- Dr Ernest Augustus Boxer – president of the New Zealand Returned Soldiers' Association.
- Gavin Macaulay Hamilton MVO – lately secretary to the governor-general and commander-in-chief of New Zealand.
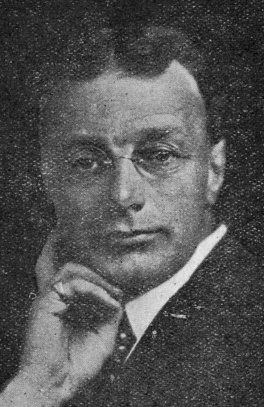
Ernest Boxer

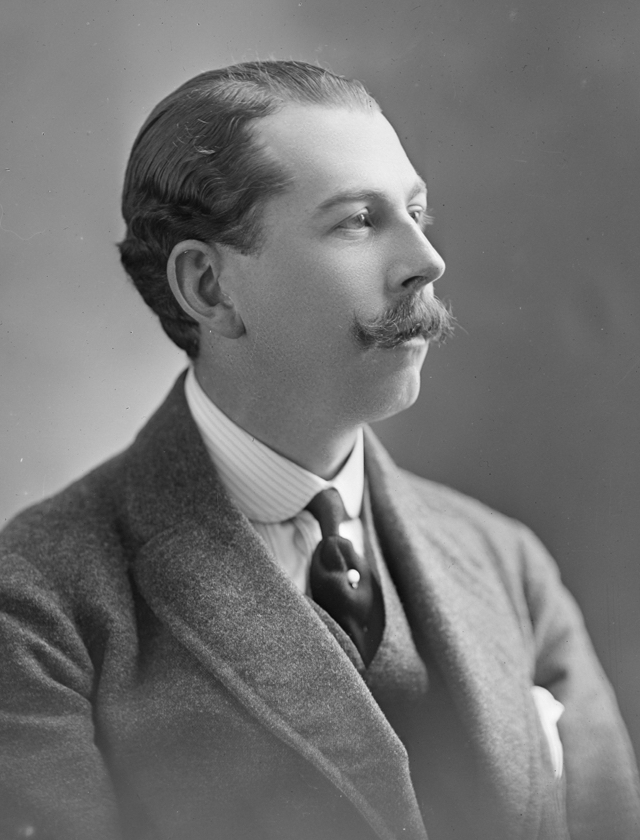
Gavin Hamilton
