= Charles Hall (New Zealand politician) =

New Zealand politician (c.1842–1937)

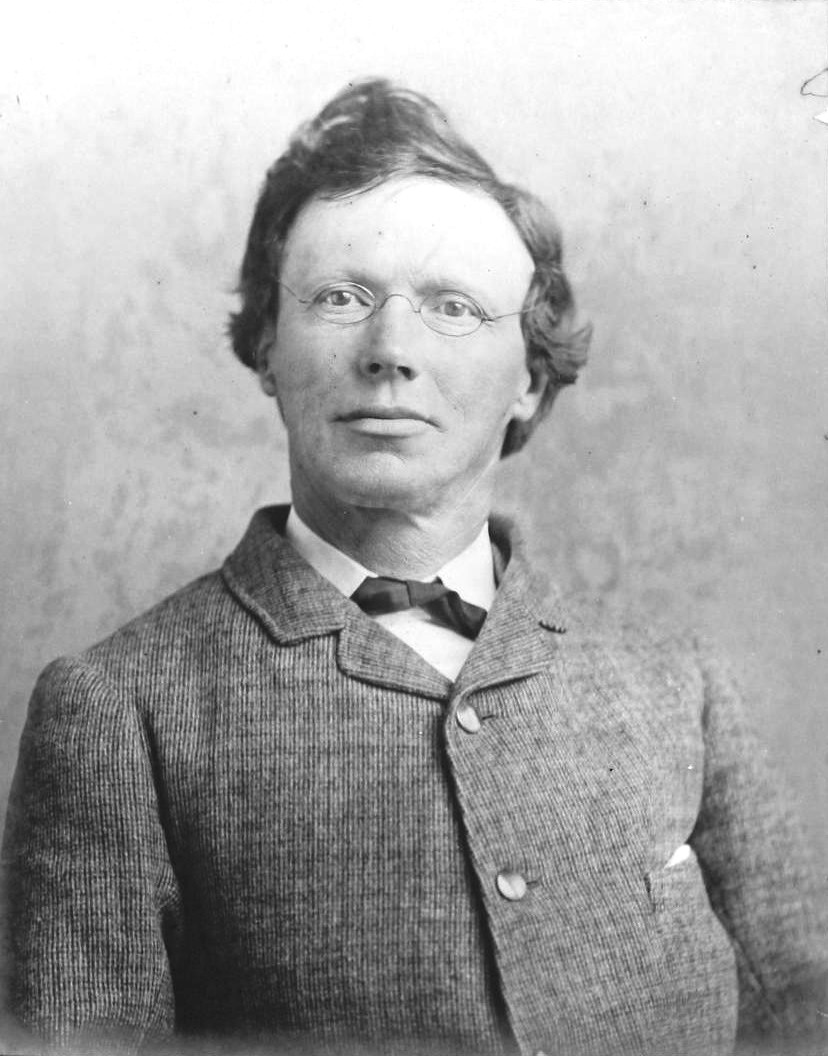

Member of the New Zealand Parliament for Waipawa
- In office 1893–1896
- Preceded by: William Cowper Smith
- Succeeded by: George Hunter
- In office 1899–1911
- Preceded by: George Hunter
- Succeeded by: George Hunter

Mayor of Woodville
- In office 1889–1890
- Preceded by: Joseph Sowry
- Succeeded by: Hubert Burnett

Personal details
- Born: 1843 Malton, Yorkshire, England
- Died: 29 May 1937 (aged 93–94) Wellington, New Zealand
- Party: Liberal
- Children: Three

Charles Hall (c. 1842 – 29 May 1937) was a Liberal Party Member of Parliament in New Zealand. He represented the Waipawa electorate from 1893 to 1896 when he was defeated, then from 1899 to 1911 when he retired.

== Biography ==
=== Early life ===
Hall was born at Malton, Yorkshire, in about 1842. His first wife, Eliza died in her youth leaving Hall a widower. They had one child, a daughter. Hall decided to shift to New Zealand and arrived at Napier in the ship Countess of Kintore in 1875 and entered the building trade upon arrival. Hall started up trade in Napier where he married Marian Dinsdale in 1878; the marriage issued two children one daughter and one son. He was keenly interested in land settlement and in 1880 took up a bush section in northern Manawatu. His family's home was destroyed in a bush fire and he and his family moved to Woodville where he again entered the building trade.

Owing to his active interest in land settlement, Hall was appointed by the government to serve as a selector for government land subdivisions. He assisted in the settlement of the Hall and Malton blocks near Woodville, and was also an original selector in the Mangahao block, near Pahiatua.

=== Political career ===
New Zealand Parliament
Years	Term	Electorate	Party
1893–1896	12th	Waipawa	Liberal
1899–1902	14th	Waipawa	Liberal
1902–1905	15th	Waipawa	Liberal
1905–1908	16th	Waipawa	Liberal
1908–1911	17th	Waipawa	Liberal

Hall had a long, and active public life. He started his career locally holding many civil authority positions, serving as the mayor of Woodville, chairman of the Waipawa County Council, District Coroner, a member of the Waipawa Licensing Committee and a member of the Hawke's Bay Education Board.

In 1893 Hall was elected to Parliament as MP for Waipawa as the Liberal Party candidate. At the next election he lost his seat to the Conservative candidate George Hunter. In 1899 he won the seat back and would retain it until the 1911 election when he chose to retire from national politics.

== Later life and death ==
After retiring from Parliament Hall travelled back to England and stayed there for three years before returning in 1915 and settling in Dannevirke. His second wife died in 1918 and Hall himself died in 1937 in Wellington aged 95 years old. He was survived by all three of his children.

== Notes ==
New Zealand Parliament
Preceded by William Cowper Smith	Member of Parliament for Waipawa; 1893–1896; 1899–1911	Succeeded by George Hunter
Preceded by George Hunter	Member of Parliament for Waipawa; 1893–1896; 1899–1911	Succeeded by George Hunter
Political offices
Preceded by Joseph Sowry	Mayor of Woodville; 1889-1890	Succeeded by Hubert Burnett
