= Theophilus Cooper (judge) =

New Zealand compositor, lawyer and judge

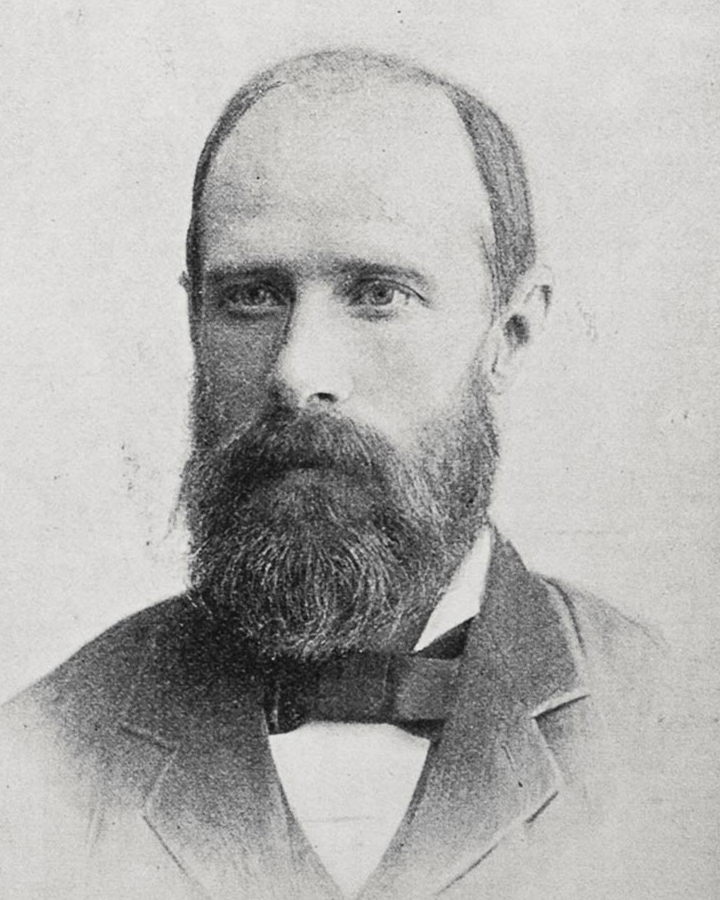
Theophilus Cooper

Sir Theophilus Cooper (15 November 1850 – 18 May 1925) was a New Zealand compositor, lawyer and judge. He was born in Newington, Surrey, England, on 15 November 1850. Cooper was conferred a knighthood in the 1921 New Year Honours.
