= Waipawa (electorate) =

Waipawa was a parliamentary electorate in the Hawke's Bay Region of New Zealand, from 1881 to 1946.

== Population centres ==
The previous electoral redistribution was undertaken in 1875 for the 1875–1876 election. In the six years since, New Zealand's European population had increased by 65%. In the 1881 electoral redistribution, the House of Representatives increased the number of European representatives to 91 (up from 84 since the 1875–76 election). The number of Māori electorates was held at four. The House further decided that electorates should not have more than one representative, which led to 35 new electorates being formed, including Waipawa, and two electorates that had previously been abolished to be recreated. This necessitated a major disruption to existing boundaries.

The legislation defined the area as follows:

This district is bounded towards the North by the Hawke's Bay Electoral District; towards the East by the sea; towards the South by the Waimata Stream to its source; thence by a right line to Trig. Station No. 41a; thence by a right line to Trig. Station on Whahatuaro; then by the Manawatu River to the Manawatu Gorge; thence towards the West by lines from peak to peak along the summit of the Ruahine Range to the Hawke's Bay Electoral District,

== History ==
The Waipawa electorate was established for the 1881 election.

William Cowper Smith was the first representative. He was re-elected in 1884. From 1887 to 1890 Smith represented the Woodville electorate, which only existed for those three years.

The representative for Waipawa for the period from 1887 to 1890 was Thomas Tanner; he retired at the end of the parliamentary term. Tanner was succeeded by Smith in the 1890 election; Smith retired at the end of the parliamentary term.

Charles Hall represented Waipawa for the Liberal Party from 1893 to 1896, when he was defeated by George Hunter. Hall in turn defeated Hunter in the 1899 election and then served the electorate until 1911, when he retired. The 1911 election was won by Hunter, who continued to represent the electorate until 1930.

An interesting situation arose in 1928. D. B. Kent was originally announced as an independent Liberal-Labour candidate. He was then approached by the United Party and became their official candidate. The local supporters of the United Party had not been consulted on this, and did not support Kent, but backed Ernest Albert Goodger instead. Goodger thus stood as an independent United candidate. This split the United Party vote, but Hunter again won with an absolute majority.

Hunter's death on 20 August 1930 caused the 1930 by-election, which was won by Albert Jull. Jull was confirmed by the voters in the 1931 election, but was defeated in 1935 election by Max Christie. Jull in turn defeated Christie in 1938, but he died on 24 September 1940. Jull was succeeded by Cyril Harker, who won the 1940 by-election. Harker was confirmed by the voters in the 1943 election. He served until the end of the parliamentary term in 1946, when the electorate was abolished.

=== Members of Parliament ===
The electorate was represented by seven Members of Parliament:

Key

Independent Liberal Conservative Reform United Labour National

Election	Winner
1881 election	William Cowper Smith
1884 election	William Cowper Smith
1887 election	Thomas Tanner
1890 election	William Cowper Smith
1893 election	Charles Hall
1896 election	George Hunter
1899 election	Charles Hall
1902 election	Charles Hall
1905 election	Charles Hall
1908 election	Charles Hall
1911 election	George Hunter
1914 election	George Hunter
1919 election	George Hunter
1922 election	George Hunter
1925 election	George Hunter
1928 election	George Hunter
1930 by-election	Albert Jull
1931 election	Albert Jull
1935 election	Max Christie
1938 election	Albert Jull
1940 by-election	Cyril Harker
1943 election	Cyril Harker
(Electorate abolished in 1946; see Hawkes Bay)

== Election results ==
=== 1943 election ===
1943 general election: Waipawa
Party	Candidate	Votes	%	±%
National	Cyril Harker	5,546	60.98	−0.34
Labour	Archie Low	3,455	37.99	
Informal votes		93	1.02	+0.60
Majority		2,091	22.99	+1.71
Turnout		9,094	91.71	+15.57
Registered electors		9,915		

=== 1940 by-election ===
1940 Waipawa by-election
Party	Candidate	Votes	%	±%
National	Cyril Harker	4,913	60.64	
Labour	Max Christie	3,189	39.36	−7.93
Majority		1,724	21.28	
Informal votes		34	0.42	−0.41
Turnout		8,136	76.14	−18.77
Registered electors		10,685		
National hold		Swing		

=== 1938 election ===
1938 general election: Waipawa
Party	Candidate	Votes	%	±%
National	Albert Jull	5,070	51.86	+18.95
Labour	Max Christie	4,624	47.29	+11.37
Informal votes		82	0.83	+0.28
Majority		446	4.56	
Turnout		9,776	94.91	+1.54
Registered electors		10,300		

=== 1935 election ===
1935 general election: Waipawa
Party	Candidate	Votes	%	±%
Labour	Max Christie	3,089	35.92	
United	Albert Jull	2,830	32.91	−19.71
Independent Reform	John Ormond	2,121	24.66	−22.72
Democrat	William Long Barker	559	6.50	
Informal votes		48	0.55	−1.04
Majority		259	3.01	
Turnout		8,599	93.37	
Registered electors		9,209		

=== 1931 election ===
1931 general election: Waipawa
Party	Candidate	Votes	%	±%
United	Albert Jull	3,870	52.62	
Reform	John Davies Ormond Jr. (Note: Ormond was the son of John Davies Ormond and the father of John Ormond)	3,484	47.38	
Informal votes		119	1.59	
Majority		386	5.25	
Turnout		7,473	80.99	
Registered electors		9,227		

=== 1930 by-election ===
1930 Waipawa by-election
Party	Candidate	Votes	%	±%
United	Albert Jull	3,747	52.06	
Reform	William Tucker	3,450	47.93	
Majority		297	4.12	
Turnout		7,197		
United gain from Reform		Swing		

=== 1928 election ===
1928 general election: Waipawa
Party	Candidate	Votes	%	±%
Reform	George Hunter	3,983	53.33	−9.05
Independent	Ernest Albert Goodger	2,123	28.43	
United	Douglas Barrington Kent	1,362	18.24	
Informal votes		77	1.02	−0.22
Majority		1,860	24.91	+0.14
Turnout		7,545	85.80	−4.34
Registered electors		8,794		

=== 1925 election ===
1925 general election: Waipawa
Party	Candidate	Votes	%	±%
Reform	George Hunter	4,486	62.38	+4.31
Liberal	William Ashton Chambers	2,705	37.62	
Informal votes		90	1.24	+0.06
Majority		1,781	24.77	+8.62
Turnout		7,281	90.13	+3.77
Registered electors		8,078		

=== 1922 election ===
1922 general election: Waipawa
Party	Candidate	Votes	%	±%
Reform	George Hunter	3,870	58.07	+6.01
Liberal	John Langridge	2,794	41.93	
Informal votes		79	1.17	+0.10
Majority		1,076	16.15	+12.02
Turnout		6,743	86.36	+1.20
Registered electors		7,808		

=== 1919 election ===
1919 general election: Waipawa
Party	Candidate	Votes	%	±%
Reform	George Hunter	3,458	52.06	+0.99
Liberal	Albert Jull	3,184	47.94	−0.99
Informal votes		72	1.07	−0.38
Majority		274	4.13	+1.98
Turnout		6,714	85.16	−1.12
Registered electors		7,884		

=== 1914 election ===
1914 general election: Waipawa
Party	Candidate	Votes	%	±%
Reform	George Hunter	3,282	51.07	−3.51
Liberal	Albert Jull	3,144	48.93	+3.51
Informal votes		95	1.46	−0.03
Majority		138	2.15	−7.02
Turnout		6,521	86.28	+4.69
Registered electors		7,558		

=== 1911 election ===
1911 general election: Waipawa, first ballot
Party	Candidate	Votes	%	±%
Reform	George Hunter	3,389	54.58	+4.08
Liberal	Albert Jull	2,820	45.42	
Informal votes		94	1.49	
Majority		569	9.16	+8.16
Turnout		6,303	81.59	+2.75
Registered electors		7,725		

=== 1908 election ===
1908 general election: Waipawa, first ballot
Party	Candidate	Votes	%	±%
Liberal	Charles Hall	2,507	50.50	+11.13
Conservative	George Hunter	2,457	49.50	−11.13
Turnout		4,964	78.84	−8.09
Majority		50	1.01	−20.25
Registered electors		6,296		

=== 1905 election ===
1905 general election: Waipawa
Party	Candidate	Votes	%	±%
Liberal	Charles Hall	3,576	60.63	−11.49
Conservative	George Hunter	2,322	39.37	
Informal votes		51	0.86	
Majority		1,254	21.26	−22.98
Turnout		5,949	86.94	+18.49
Registered electors		6,843		

=== 1902 election ===
1902 general election: Waipawa
Party	Candidate	Votes	%	±%
Liberal	Charles Hall	2,556	72.12	+15.34
Independent Liberal	James Taylor	988	27.88	
Majority		1,568	44.24	+30.68
Turnout		3,544	68.44	−15.27
Registered electors		5,178		

=== 1899 election ===
1899 general election: Waipawa
Party	Candidate	Votes	%	±%
Liberal	Charles Hall	2,332	56.78	+9.62
Conservative	George Hunter	1,775	43.22	−9.62
Majority		557	13.56	+7.88
Turnout		4,107	83.71	−0.88
Registered electors		4,906		

=== 1896 election ===
1896 general election: Waipawa
Party	Candidate	Votes	%	±%
Conservative	George Hunter	1,961	52.84	+11.58
Liberal	Charles Hall	1,750	47.16	−3.58
Majority		211	5.69	−3.79
Turnout		3,711	84.59	+3.22
Registered electors		4,387		

=== 1893 election ===
1893 general election: Waipawa
Party	Candidate	Votes	%	±%
Liberal	Charles Hall	2,024	50.74	
Conservative	George Hunter	1,646	41.26	−4.54
Independent	William Warrand Carlile	319	8.00	
Majority		378	9.48	−6.89
Turnout		3,989	81.37	+28.16
Registered electors		4,902		

=== 1890 election ===
1890 general election: Waipawa
Party	Candidate	Votes	%	±%
Liberal	William Cowper Smith	1,297	57.77	
Conservative	George Hunter	948	42.23	
Majority		349	15.55	+10.04
Turnout		2,245	60.92	−5.81
Registered electors		3,685		

=== 1887 election ===
1887 general election: Waipawa
Party	Candidate	Votes	%	±%
Independent	Thomas Tanner	695	44.02	+5.60
Independent	John Harker	608	38.51	
Independent	Fred Sutton	236	14.95	
Independent	Arthur Rowley William Lascelles	40	2.53	
Majority		87	5.51	−17.67
Turnout		1,579	66.74	−0.49
Registered electors		2,366		

=== 1884 election ===
1884 general election: Waipawa
Party	Candidate	Votes	%	±%
Independent	William Cowper Smith	768	61.59	+10.48
Independent	Thomas Tanner	479	38.41	
Majority		289	23.18	+20.97
Turnout		1,247	67.22	−4.21
Registered electors		1,855		

=== 1881 election ===
1881 general election: Waipawa
Party	Candidate	Votes	%	±%
Independent	William Cowper Smith	579	51.10	
Independent	John Davies Ormond	554	48.90	
Majority		25	2.21	
Turnout		1,133	71.44	
Registered electors		1,586		
