= Te Aro (electorate) =

Te Aro was a parliamentary electorate in Wellington, New Zealand, from 1881 to 1890. It covered the southern area of the central business district. During the three parliamentary terms of its existence, the electorate was represented by three Members of Parliament.

== Population centres ==
The previous electoral redistribution was undertaken in 1875 for the 1875–1876 election. In the six years since, New Zealand's European population had increased by 65%. In the 1881 electoral redistribution, the House of Representatives increased the number of European representatives to 91 (up from 84 since the 1875–76 election). The number of Māori electorates was held at four. The House further decided that electorates should not have more than one representative, which led to 35 new electorates being formed, including Te Aro, and two electorates that had previously been abolished to be recreated. This necessitated a major disruption to existing boundaries.

The electorate was based on the inner suburb of Te Aro, which is located in the southern end of the central business district. In the 1887 electoral redistribution, the Te Aro electorate lost much of its southern area to the newly formed Wellington East electorate. In the 1890 electoral redistribution, the Te Aro electorate was abolished, and the area became part of the three-member City of Wellington electorate.

== History ==
The Te Aro electorate was represented by three Members of Parliament:

- Charles Johnston from 1881 to 1887 (resigned)
- Francis Fraser in 1887 (defeated)
- Stuart Menteath from 1887 to 1890 (retired)

=== Members of Parliament ===
Unless otherwise stated, all MPs terms began and ended at a general election.

Key

Independent

Election	Winner
1881 election	Charles Johnston
1884 election	Charles Johnston
1887 by-election	Francis Fraser
1887 election	Stuart Menteath
(Electorate abolished in 1890; see City of Wellington)

== Election results ==
=== 1887 election ===
1887 general election: Te Aro
Party	Candidate	Votes	%	±%
Independent	Stuart Menteath	877	54.98	
Independent	Francis Fraser	718	45.02	
Majority		159	9.97	
Turnout		1,595		

=== 1887 by-election ===
1887 Te Aro by-election
Party	Candidate	Votes	%	±%
Independent	Francis Fraser	506	53.43	+17.03
Independent	William Travers	346	36.53	
Independent	Joseph Nancarrow	95	10.03	
Majority		160	16.89	
Turnout		947	43.48	
Registered electors		2,178		

=== 1884 election ===
1884 general election: Te Aro
Party	Candidate	Votes	%	±%
Independent	Charles Johnston	346	37.94	
Independent	Francis Fraser	332	36.40	
Independent	Edward Shaw	129	14.14	
Independent	John H. Shaw	71	7.79	
Independent	James O'Shea	34	3.73	
Majority		14	1.54	−3.65
Turnout		912		

=== 1881 election ===
1881 general election: Te Aro
Party	Candidate	Votes	%	±%
Independent	Charles Johnston	397	37.45	
Independent	John H. Shaw	342	32.26	
Independent	Edward Stafford	321	30.28	
Majority		55	5.19	
Turnout		1,060		
