= Francis Fraser (politician) =

New Zealand politician

The Honourable Francis Fraser
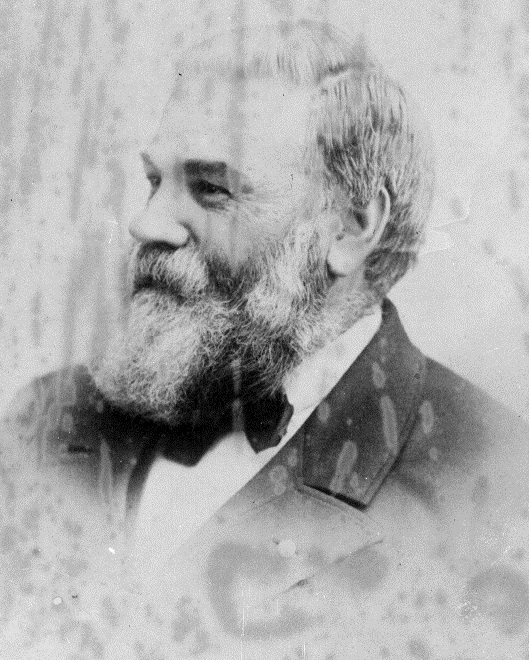

Member of the New Zealand Parliament for Te Aro
- In office 15 April 1887 – 15 July 1887
- Preceded by: Charles Johnston
- Succeeded by: Stuart Menteath

New Zealand Legislative Councillor
- In office 1899–1906
- Appointed by: Richard Seddon

Personal details
- Born: 1833 London, England
- Died: 1911 (aged 77–78) Wellington, New Zealand
- Party: Liberal

Francis Humphris Fraser PC MP (1833–1911) was a politician in Wellington, New Zealand.

== Early life ==
Born in London, England, in 1833, Fraser grew up in Edinburgh, where he attended Watson's Hospital School. In 1847, he returned to London briefly before embarking on a journey to New Zealand. His arrival in Wellington occurred in 1864 aboard the Wild Duck.

== Political career ==
=== National politics ===
New Zealand Parliament
Years	Term	Electorate	Party
1887	9th	Te Aro	Independent

Fraser briefly represented the Te Aro electorate in Wellington in 1887 after winning a by-election, from 15 April to 15 July, when he was defeated. He unsuccessfully contested the three-member Wellington electorate in the 1890, 1893, and 1896 elections where he came sixth, fifth and seventh respectively. Later, he was a member of the New Zealand Legislative Council for one seven-year term from 1899 to 1906.

=== Local politics ===
Fraser won a seat on the Wellington City Council in 1888. During his tenure on the council he was the central figure of Wellington's temperance movement. He also served on the Wellington Harbour Board, District Charitable Aid Board, and Wellington Hospital Trustees Board. The latter of these he also held the position of chairman.

Political offices
Preceded by Thomas John William Gale	Chair of Wellington Harbour Board; 1897–1899	Succeeded by John Hutcheson
New Zealand Parliament
Preceded by Charles Johnston	Member of Parliament for Te Aro; 1887–1887	Succeeded by Stuart Menteath
