= Masterton (electorate) =

Masterton was a New Zealand electorate from 1887 to 1946, focused on the town of Masterton and the surrounding area.

== Population centres ==
In the 1887 electoral redistribution, although the Representation Commission was required through the Representation Act 1887 to maintain existing electorates "as far as possible", rapid population growth in the North Island required the transfer of three seats from the South Island to the north. Ten new electorates were created, including Masterton, and one former electorate was recreated.

The Masterton electorate's boundaries were roughly based on those of the Wairarapa North electorate that it replaced, although it was not an exact match. The electorate ran from the Tararua Ranges down to the sea, with its northern boundary just north of Eketāhuna and its southern boundary just south of the largest Wairarapa town of Masterton.

The 1890 election saw the electorate gain Pahiatua and Woodville, but lose territory on the coast south of Castlepoint. At the 1893 elections, it lost Woodville, and in the 1896 election, it lost Pahiatua. In the 1911 election, it lost Castlepoint, leaving it almost landlocked.

== History ==
The electorate of Masterton was created for the 1887 general election. It was represented by five Members of Parliament.

The electorate was abolished in 1946; the town of Masterton itself was moved to the Wairarapa electorate, while the rest was moved to the Pahiatua electorate.

=== Election results ===
Key

Independent Liberal Reform Labour National

Election	Winner
1887 election	George Beetham
1890 election	Alexander Hogg
1893 election	Alexander Hogg
1896 election	Alexander Hogg
1899 election	Alexander Hogg
1902 election	Alexander Hogg
1905 election	Alexander Hogg
1908 election	Alexander Hogg
1911 election	George Sykes
1914 election	George Sykes
1919 election	George Sykes
1922 election	George Sykes
1925 election	George Sykes
1928 election	George Sykes
1931 election	George Sykes
1935 election	John Robertson
1938 election	John Robertson
1943 election	Garnet Mackley
(Electorate abolished in 1946; see Wairarapa)

== Election results ==
=== 1943 election ===
1943 general election: Masterton
Party	Candidate	Votes	%	±%
National	Garnet Mackley	5,061	47.88	
Labour	John Robertson	4,567	43.21	−7.28
Democratic Labour	Donald Alexander Thompson	581	5.49	
Independent	Justin McCarthy Power	285	2.69	
Informal votes		75	0.70	−0.08
Majority		494	4.67	
Turnout		10,569	91.94	−2.39
Registered electors		11,495		

=== 1938 election ===
1938 general election: Masterton
Party	Candidate	Votes	%	±%
Labour	John Robertson	5,385	50.49	+13.03
National	Jack Irving	5,195	48.71	
Informal votes		84	0.78	+0.48
Majority		190	1.78	−1.66
Turnout		10,664	94.33	+1.66
Registered electors		11,304		

=== 1935 election ===
1935 general election: Masterton
Party	Candidate	Votes	%	±%
Labour	John Robertson	3,532	37.46	
Reform	George Sykes	3,207	34.01	−23.29
Democrat	Thomas Hislop	2,688	28.51	
Informal votes		29	0.30	−0.37
Majority		325	3.44	
Turnout		9,427	92.67	+7.88
Registered electors		10,172		

=== 1931 election ===
1931 general election: Masterton
Party	Candidate	Votes	%	±%
Reform	George Sykes	4,660	57.30	
Labour	Peter Butler	2,709	33.31	
Independent	Arthur Henry Vile	764	9.39	
Informal votes		55	0.67	
Majority		1,951	23.99	
Turnout		8,188	84.79	
Registered electors		9,657		

=== 1928 election ===
1928 general election: Masterton
Party	Candidate	Votes	%	±%
Reform	George Sykes	4,207	48.62	−6.63
United	William Thompson	2,969	34.31	
Labour	Ben Roberts	1,477	17.07	
Informal votes		72	0.83	−0.23
Majority		1,238	14.31	+2.75
Turnout		8,725	89.92	−1.90
Registered electors		9,703		

=== 1925 election ===
1925 general election: Masterton
Party	Candidate	Votes	%	±%
Reform	George Sykes	4,403	55.25	
Liberal	Jack Andrews	3,481	43.68	
Informal votes		85	1.06	
Majority		922	11.56	
Turnout		7,969	91.82	
Registered electors		8,678		

=== 1899 election ===
1899 general election: Masterton
Party	Candidate	Votes	%	±%
Liberal	Alexander Hogg	2,591	64.92	
Conservative	Charles Edwin Cockburn-Hood	1,400	35.08	
Majority		1,191	29.84	
Turnout		3,991	77.17	
Registered electors		5,172		

=== 1893 election ===
1893 general election: Masterton
Party	Candidate	Votes	%	±%
Liberal	Alexander Hogg	2,282	60.63	+9.80
Conservative	Joseph Harkness	1,054	28.00	
Liberal	William Wilson McCardle	428	11.37	
Majority		1,228	32.62	+31.78
Turnout		3,764	69.59	+9.88
Registered electors		5,409		

=== 1890 election ===
1890 general election: Masterton
Party	Candidate	Votes	%	±%
Liberal	Alexander Hogg	1,069	50.43	
Conservative	George Beetham	1,051	49.57	
Majority		18	0.84	
Turnout		2,120	49.71	
Registered electors		4,264		
