= Wellington South and Suburbs =

Wellington South and Suburbs was a parliamentary electorate in Wellington, New Zealand, from 1887 to 1890.

== Population centres ==
In the 1887 electoral redistribution, although the Representation Commission was required through the Representation Act 1887 to maintain existing electorates "as far as possible", rapid population growth in the North Island required the transfer of three seats from the South Island to the north. Ten new electorates were created, including Wellington South and Suburbs, and one former electorate was recreated.

== History ==
The electorate was formed for the 1887 election and was represented by one Member of Parliament, Charles Beard Izard. Izard and J. Coombes contested the election, receiving 710 and 454 votes, respectively. Izard had on two occasions previously contested the Foxton electorate without success.

in the 1887 general election a candidate a Mr Wilson caused some mirth when he said he was teetotal and was in favour of the franchise being extended to females for the temperance cause alone but not for politics.

The Wellington South and Suburbs electorate was abolished at the end of the parliamentary term in 1890. Izard stood in the Hutt electorate in the 1890 election but was unsuccessful.

=== Election results ===
Key

Independent

Election	Winner
1887 election	Charles Izard
