= Alfred Baldey =

New Zealand politician (1836–1924)

Alfred Baldey (1836 – 19 August 1924) was a member of the New Zealand Legislative Council representing Liberal Party interests from Southland.

== Private life ==
Baldey was born at Brighton, Sussex, England, in 1836. He was educated at Brotherhood Hall Grammar School, Steyning. He emigrated to Victoria, Australia, in 1852 and was present at the Eureka Rebellion. He returned to England in 1859. He then emigrated to Otago, New Zealand, in 1861. He took up land at Ryal Bush, some 15 km north of Invercargill, and farmed in the area.

Baldey was married, in 1861, to Elizabeth, a daughter of James Laing of Waianiwa, Southland. They had three sons and four daughters.

== Political career ==
Baldey was involved with local public affairs in Southland and served for 17 years on the County Council, 14 years on the Bluff Harbour Board, 7 years on the Hospital and Charitable Aid Board, and 26 years on the Education Board. He was at various times chairman of all these public bodies; he had also served for many years as a member of the Southland Land Board, and the Otago School Commissioners.

He was unknown outside of Southland, and his appointment to the Legislative Council by the Seddon Ministry on 18 March 1903 came as a surprise. The Press in Christchurch even pondered in an editorial:

Now everybody is asking, who is Mr. Baldey M.L.C.?

It was speculated that Baldey was not, in fact, appointed by Richard Seddon, but rather by the fellow Southland politician Joseph Ward, who was Colonial Secretary at that time and of whose company 'J. G. Ward Company' Baldey was a director.

Baldey was reappointed at the end of the first seven-year term, but was not reappointed on 17 March 1917 when the second term finished, as by then the Liberal Party was no longer in Government and Baldey was a strong opponent of the Reform Party.

== Death ==
After he was appointed to the Legislative Council, Baldey had moved to Wellington and remained there for the rest of his life. Baldey died on 19 August 1924 at his home on The Terrace, Wellington. His widow remarried in 1927 at Vaucluse, New South Wales.
