= William Cowper Smith =

New Zealand politician (1843–1911)

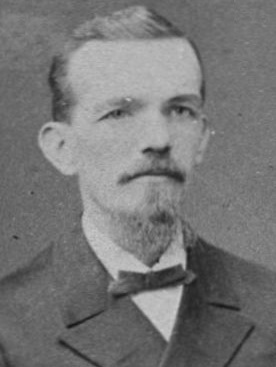
Smith c. 1882

William Cowper Smith (1843 – 5 March 1911) was a Liberal Party Member of Parliament in New Zealand.

== Biography ==
William Cowper Smith was born in London on 28 December 1843, went to Queen Elizabeth's School, Barnet, arrived on the Egmont at Lyttelton on 7 July 1862, went to Auckland, received a war medal for service during the invasion of the Waikato and moved to Waipukurau in 1872, where he ran a drapery and general store. In 1877 he was elected to Waipukurau Road Board and from 1879 was on Waipawa County Council.

New Zealand Parliament
Years	Term	Electorate	Party
1881–1884	8th	Waipawa	Independent
1884–1887	9th	Waipawa	Independent
1887–1890	10th	Woodville	Independent
1890–1893	11th	Waipawa	Liberal

Smith defeated John Davies Ormond to represent the Waipawa electorate from 1881 to 1887. His victory was narrow and described by one paper as a defeat of squatocracy; the 1891 Liberal government introduced reforms to break up large farms whose owners had often moved abroad. In the next election Smith was elected in the Woodville electorate, from 1887 to 1890 (the electorate only existed for those three years), then the Waipawa electorate again from 1890 to 1893, when he retired, due to poor health.

On 13 December 1895, he was appointed to the Legislative Council. At the expiry of the seven-year terms, he was reappointed on 13 December 1902 and on 13 December 1909. He remained a member until his death on 5 March 1911. For three periods between 1902 and 1908, he was Chairman of Committees of the Legislative Council. He had been the government's preferred candidate as Chairman of Committees in 1901 but W. D. H. Baillie won the election and was confirmed for another (his last) session.

He married Emma Augusta Tester, on 14 January 1874. His eldest son was Charles Cowper Smith, born on 16 Jan 1875, who became chairman of Hawke's Bay County Council. Emma died on 17 November 1882, aged 35. Two years after her death, he married Georgina Annie Grant, on 12 August 1884. Their son, Marcus Smith, was mayor of Dannevirke and was considered for the Reform candidate for Pahiatua. Georgina died on 17 February 1962, aged 100. By his two marriages he had several sons and daughters. He died of pneumonia and was buried at Waipukurau Cemetery.

== Notes ==
Political offices
Preceded by W. D. H. Baillie	Chairman of Committees of the Legislative Council; 1902–1903 1906 1907–1908	Succeeded by John Rigg
Preceded by Richard Reeves	Chairman of Committees of the Legislative Council; 1902–1903 1906 1907–1908	Succeeded by Richard Reeves
Preceded by Richard Reeves	Chairman of Committees of the Legislative Council; 1902–1903 1906 1907–1908	Succeeded by Richard Reeves
New Zealand Parliament
New constituency	Member of Parliament for Waipawa; 1881–1887 1890–1893	Succeeded by Thomas Tanner
Preceded by Thomas Tanner	Member of Parliament for Waipawa; 1881–1887 1890–1893	Succeeded by Charles Hall
