= Albert Jull =

New Zealand politician

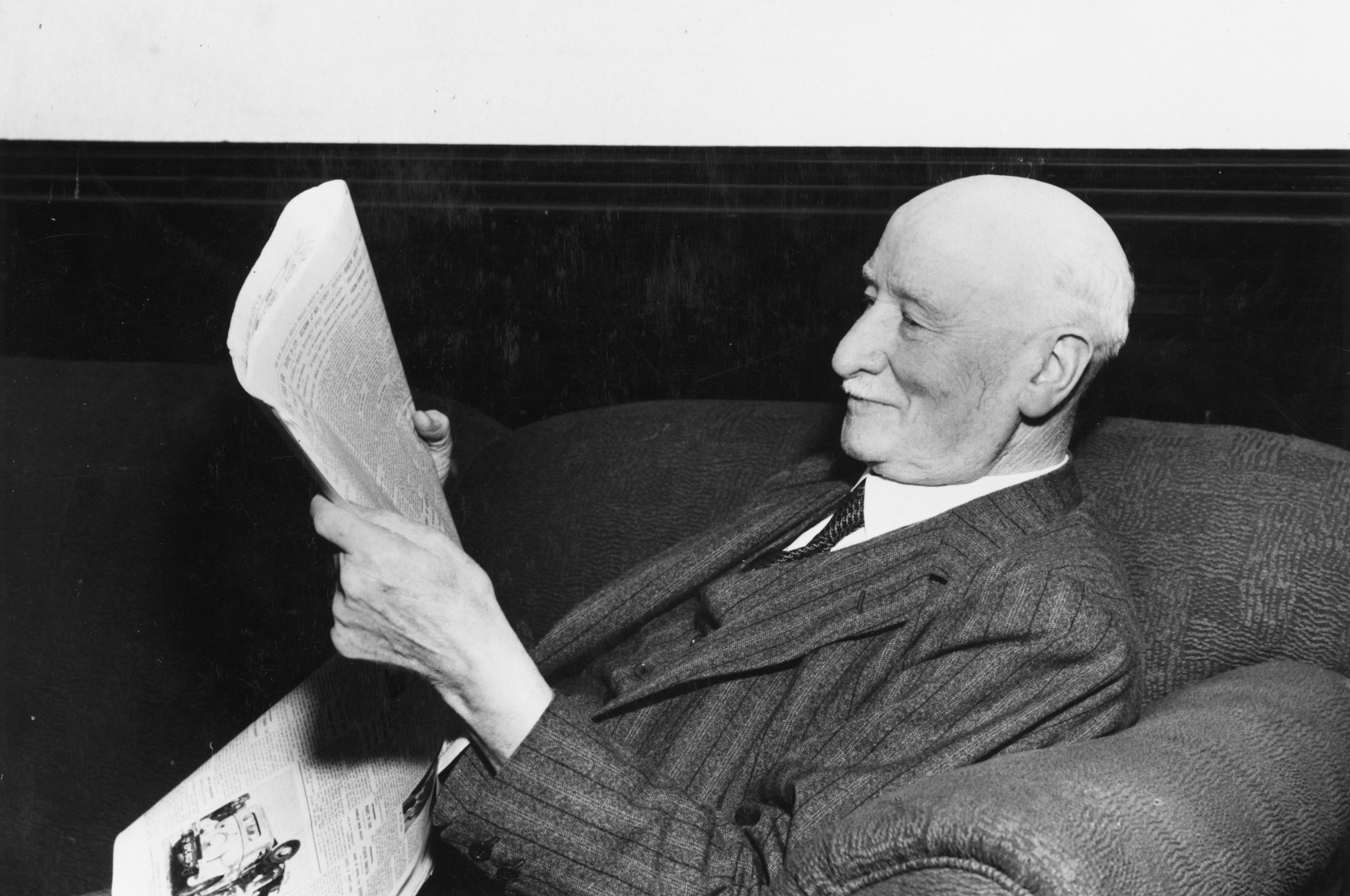
Albert Jull in c. 1939

Albert Edward Jull (6 December 1864 – 24 September 1940) was a New Zealand politician of the Liberal Party, the United Party and from 1938 the National Party.

== Canada ==
Jull was born in Fort Eria, Canada West, in 1864. He received his education in Brantford at various public schools.

== Life in New Zealand ==
He came to New Zealand with his parents in 1877. He arrived in Waipawa in 1881, for some years was engaged in store-keeping, and subsequently established himself in the brewing industry. Jull was chairman of the Waipawa County Council, was elected president of the New Zealand Counties Association in 1901, was for some years chairman of the Waipawa Town Board and of the District Hospital Board, and in 1894 was president of the New Zealand Fire Brigades' Association. He is an enthusiastic Oddfellow, is a Past Provincial Grand Master of the Hawke's Bay district, and in 1906 represented the district at the biennial conference held at Nelson. He chaired the Napier Harbour Board for 20 years, a role from which he retired in 1932.

== Political activity ==
New Zealand Parliament
Years	Term	Electorate	Party
1930–1931	23rd	Waipawa	United
1931–1935	24th	Waipawa	United
1938–1940	26th	Waipawa	National

Jull first stood for the rural Hawke's Bay Region electorate of Waipawa in 1911 for the Liberal Party, coming second to George Hunter. Jull came second again in 1914 and 1919. In the 1922 election, he was one of four candidates in the Napier electorate as an independent, coming third.

Jull represented the Waipawa electorate from the 1930 by-election after the death of Hunter.

In the 1935 election he was defeated by Labour's Max Christie. In 1938 he won the seat back from Christie, and held it until his death.

Jull died suddenly in Waipawa on 24 September 1940.

== Notes ==
New Zealand Parliament
Preceded by George Hunter	Member of Parliament for Waipawa; 1930–1935; 1938–1940	Succeeded by Max Christie
Preceded by Max Christie	Member of Parliament for Waipawa; 1930–1935; 1938–1940	Succeeded by Cyril Harker
