= Woodville (New Zealand electorate) =

Woodville was a parliamentary electorate in the Manawatū-Whanganui region of New Zealand from 1887 to 1890.

== Population centres ==
In the 1887 electoral redistribution, although the Representation Commission was required through the Representation Act 1887 to maintain existing electorates "as far as possible", rapid population growth in the North Island required the transfer of three seats from the South Island to the north. Ten new electorates were created, including Woodville, and one former electorate was recreated.

The electorate was based on the town of Woodville. The localities of Ormondville, Dannevirke, and Norsewood were in the northern part of the electorate.

== History ==
The Woodville electorate in the Manawatū-Whanganui Region of New Zealand was formed for the 1887 election. The 1887 election was contested by William Cowper Smith, Horace Baker and William Wilson McCardle, who obtained 922, 761, and 452 votes, respectively. Smith was thus declared elected.

Smith had since 1881 represented the Waipawa electorate. After the abolition of the Woodville electorate in 1890, he successfully contested the Waipawa electorate again in the 1890 election. McCardle had in 1884 unsuccessfully contested the Wairarapa North electorate against George Beetham.

=== Members of Parliament ===
Woodville was represented by one Member of Parliament.

Key

Independent

Election	Winner
1887 election	William Cowper Smith

=== 1887 election ===
1887 general election: Woodville
Party	Candidate	Votes	%	±%
Independent	William Cowper Smith	922	43.19	
Independent	Horace Backer	761	35.64	
Independent	William Wilson McCardle	452	21.17	
Majority		161	7.54	
Turnout		2,135	65.98	
