= Max Christie (politician) =

New Zealand politician

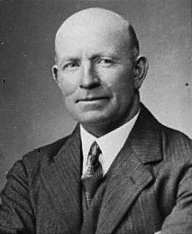
Max Christie in 1935.

Hubert Maxwell Christie OBE (27 September 1889 – 13 December 1982) was a New Zealand politician of the Labour Party.

== Biography ==
=== Early life and career ===
Christie was born in Kaiapoi in 1889, to a carpenter William Christie and his wife Sarah Jane Drabble. He had eight siblings. His family moved to Masterton and in 1914 he enlisted in the Wellington Mounted Rifles. He fought at Gallipoli in April 1915 where he was promoted to corporal, but in June he contracted gastroenteritis and was admitted to hospital in Lemnos. After a quick recovery he returned to the front in time for the August offensive. On 27 August he was promoted to sergeant before being wounded in his hand the very next day.

After his wounding, Christie was evacuated to a hospital in Alexandria before being transferred to a hospital in Birmingham, England. During his stay in England he met Amy Keats, whom he was to marry. He returned to New Zealand in January 1916 and was discharged upon his arrival on 14 April. Christie then became a sheep shearer, then a farmer and wool buyer in Pōrangahau.

=== Political career ===
New Zealand Parliament
Years	Term	Electorate	Party
1935–1938	25th	Waipawa	Labour

He was elected a member of the Patangata County Council 1929–1932. He was elected for the Waipawa electorate with the swing to Labour in the 1935 general election but was defeated in the next election in 1938.

He was likewise unsuccessful in attempting to regain the seat at a 1940 by-election.

=== Later life and death ===
Later he was appointed to many government boards and commissions, including the Loans Board, Maori Trust Board and the New Zealand Wool Board (of which he was foundation chairman). In the 1959 Queen's Birthday Honours, Christie was appointed an Officer of the Order of the British Empire, for public services.

Christie died in 1982 in Hastings.

== Notes ==
New Zealand Parliament
Preceded by Albert Jull	Member of Parliament for Waipawa; 1935–1938	Succeeded by Albert Jull
