= Charles Johnston (New Zealand politician) =

New Zealand politician

The Honourable Sir Charles Johnston
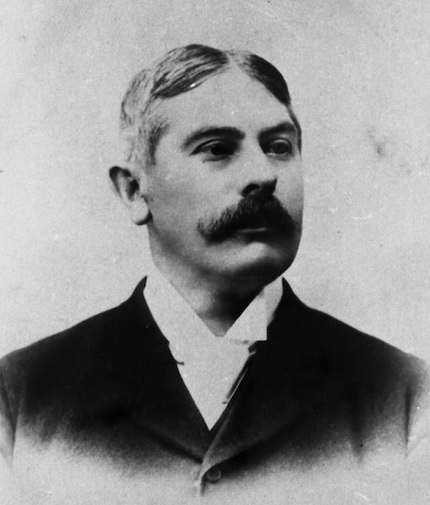
- Portrait of Johnston, ca. 1876

Mayor of Wellington
- In office 19 December 1889 – 23 December 1890
- Governor-General: The Earl of Onslow
- Preceded by: John Duthie
- Succeeded by: Arthur Winton Brown

14th Speaker of the Legislative Council
- In office 1916 – 13 June 1918
- Preceded by: Charles Bowen
- Succeeded by: Walter Carncross

Personal details
- Born: Charles John Johnston; 11 October 1845 Wellington, New Zealand
- Died: 13 June 1918 (aged 72) Karori, New Zealand
- Party: Independent
- Spouse(s): Alice, Lady Johnston
- Relations: Isaac Featherston (father-in-law)
- Children: 11
- Parent(s): John Johnston; Henrietta Charlotte Hatton

Sir Charles John Johnston (11 October 1845 – 13 June 1918) was a New Zealand politician. He was Mayor of Wellington in the Jubilee year and Speaker of the Legislative Council for the last three years of his life.

== Biography ==
He was born on 11 October 1845 in Wellington, the son of Scottish-born merchant John Johnston, a scion of the Johnstones of Annandale. He was educated at Wellington Commercial and Grammar School, and was later educated in England. He returned to New Zealand in 1864 and entered Johnston & Co who were ship owners and merchants. A brother Walter Johnston was also an MP.

In 1869, Johnston was a lieutenant in the New Zealand militia. He subsequently joined the volunteers and when the Wellington Brigade formed was appointed to the rank of captain. When he moved to the active-reserve he was appointed Captain-Commandant.

New Zealand Parliament
Years	Term	Electorate	Party
1881–1884	8th	Te Aro	Independent
1884–1887	9th	Te Aro	Independent

He represented the Te Aro electorate from 1881 to 1887, when he resigned. He was a member of the Legislative Council from 1891 until his death in 1918, and the Speaker from 1915 to 1918. He was appointed from 22 January 1891 as one of seven new members (including Harry Atkinson himself) appointed to the council by the outgoing fourth Atkinson Ministry; a move regarded by Liberals as a stacking of the upper house against the new government.

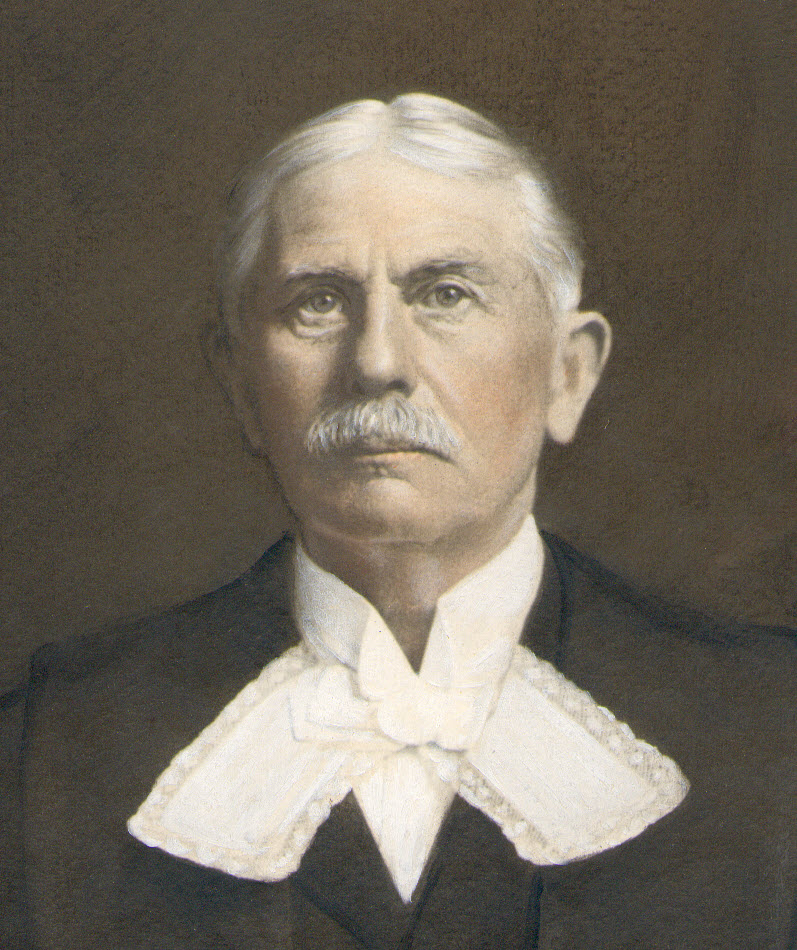
Johnston as Legislative chamber speaker, 1915

Johnston was married to Alice Margaret Featherston (1850–1931), daughter of Isaac Earl Featherston. Two of his eight sons were killed in action in World War I, Brigadier-General Francis Earl Johnston and Captain Octavius Featherston Johnston. Another four of his sons also served in the war - Guy, Charles, Harold, and Ian Johnston. He also had three daughters – Zoë, Alice, and Doris. Zoë was widowed on the death of her husband William Fitzgerald Levin from injuries suffered at Gallipoli, while Doris married The Hon. Nigel Gathorne-Hardy, who was aide-de-camp to the Governor-General of New Zealand from 1907 to 1910.

He died in Wellington on 13 June 1918 after a prolonged illness. He was knighted at the time of his death in 1918.

== Notes ==
Political offices
Preceded by Charles Bowen	Speaker of the New Zealand Legislative Council; 1915–1918	Succeeded by Walter Carncross
Preceded by John Duthie	Mayor of Wellington; 1890	Succeeded by Arthur Winton Brown
