= 1878 Christchurch mayoral election =

New Zealand mayoral election

Christchurch mayoral election, 1878
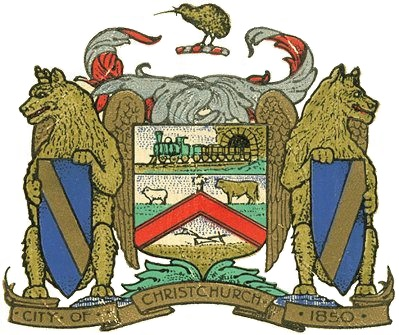
- 27 November 1878
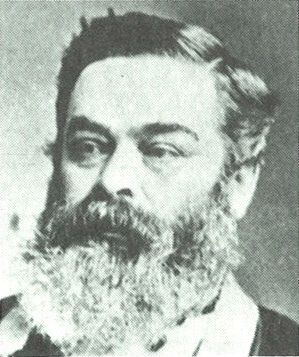

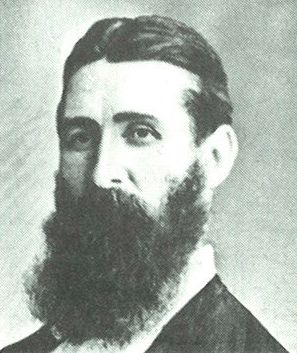
Candidate	Charles Thomas Ick	Henry Thomson
Party	Independent	Independent
Popular vote	601	343
Percentage	63.67	36.33
Mayor before election
Henry Thomson
Elected mayor
Charles Thomas Ick

The Christchurch mayoral election held on 27 November 1878 was contested by the incumbent mayor, Henry Thomson, and senior Christchurch City Councillor Charles Thomas Ick. The election was won by Ick with a large margin.

== Background ==
Initially, councillors elected one of their own as mayor towards the end of the year, and the role was usually awarded to the most senior councillor. The system changed with the introduction of The Municipal Corporations Acts Amendment Act, 1875, as that legislation stipulated that mayors had to be elected at large (i.e. by eligible voters). The 1875 election was won unopposed by the incumbent, and the 1876 election was the first that was put to public vote. The 1878 election was the third mayoral election where eligible ratepayers voted. The incumbent, Henry Thomson, was first elected in 1877.

One of the Christchurch newspapers, The Star, ran a vigorous campaign against Ick. The source of their editor's objection was Ick's alignment with former mayor William Wilson. Wilson was evidently a capable men, but his reputation was seriously dented when he lost a fraud case on all counts. Wilson stood for election to the city council once more earlier in 1878 and upon being elected, five city councillors resigned in protest, including George Ruddenklau, James Jameson, and Alexander William Bickerton.

== Candidates ==
=== Henry Thomson ===
Henry Thomson was born in Scotland in 1828. He emigrated to Australia in 1852, came to New Zealand in 1856, and settled in Christchurch in 1865. He worked as a jeweller for his father-in-law. He was also a manager for the railways. Thomson was elected onto the town and later city council in 1867, 1868, and 1875, before being elected mayor in 1877.

=== Charles Thomas Ick ===
Charles Thomas Ick came to Dunedin in 1858, where he was in business as a mercer and draper. He farmed in Waikouaiti between 1863 and 1870, when he came to Christchurch and established himself as an auctioneer. He held various public offices while living in Waikouaiti and was elected onto the Christchurch city council in 1872, 1874, and 1877. Ick contested the 1876 mayoral election but was defeated by James Gapes.

== Election ==
Ick was nominated by former mayors Henry Sawtell and James Gapes. Thomson was nominated by former mayors Andrew Duncan and James Jameson. Leslie Lee acted as the returning officer. Ick won the election by a large margin.

1878 Christchurch mayoral election
Party	Candidate	Votes	%	±%
Independent	Charles Thomas Ick	601	63.67	
Independent	Henry Thomson	343	36.33	−14.36
Majority		258	27.33	+25.94
Turnout		944		

A year later, Ick won the 1879 mayoral election against Aaron Ayers and Gapes. Ick did not stand again in 1880, and was succeeded by James Gapes.
