= Charles Louisson =

New Zealand politician

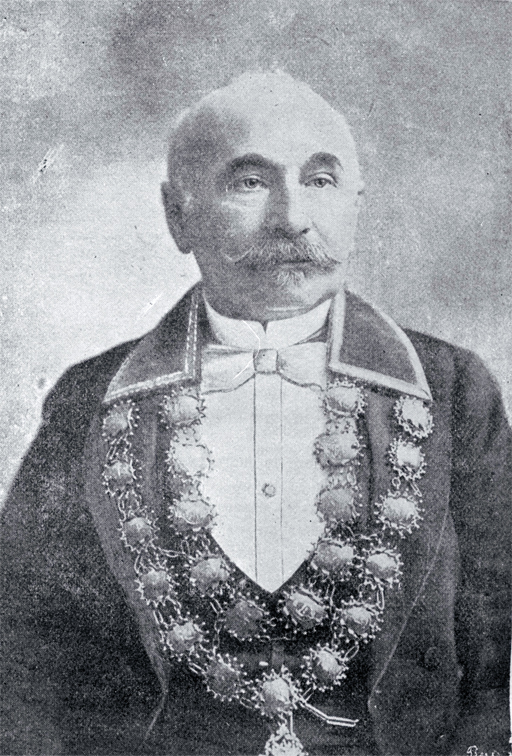
- Charles Louisson in ca 1888

New Zealand Legislative Council
- In office 22 Dec 1900 – 19 Apr 1924

15th Mayor of Christchurch
- In office 21 Dec 1887 – 18 Dec 1889
- Preceded by: Aaron Ayers
- Succeeded by: Samuel Manning
- In office 15 Dec 1897 – 20 Dec 1899
- Preceded by: Walter Cooper
- Succeeded by: William Reece

Personal details
- Born: 1840 London
- Died: 19 April 1924 (aged 82) Strowan, Christchurch
- Spouse: Hannah Louisson (m. 1878)
- Profession: brewer, businessman

Charles Melville Louisson (1840 – 19 April 1924), known as Charles Louisson or Chas Louisson, was a New Zealand politician. Born in London, and relocated to Australia as a teenager, he worked in farming and on the gold fields. He moved to Christchurch to join his brother Alfred (born 1832) in business, which they conducted in transport, as merchants and farmers in various places in the South Island. Back in Christchurch, they were joined by their brother Cecil (born 1837) and bought a brewery, which under their stewardship became very successful.

With financial security behind him, Louisson first became a councillor for Christchurch City Council for six years (1881–1887) before being elected Mayor of Christchurch (1887–1889 and 1897–1899). In all of his two elections as councillor, and four elections as mayor, he was returned unopposed. Subsequently, to his retirement from the mayoralty, he was appointed to the Legislative Council (1900–1924). He held other public offices, for example as Freemason and as a trustee of a benevolent trust. For the last 18 years of his life, he was the president of the NZ Metropolitan Trotting Club (NZMTC) in Christchurch. He helped secure the site of the Addington Raceway and was responsible for greatly extending the area.

== Early life ==
Charles Louisson was the son of George Melville Louisson, a London umbrella maker originally from Portsmouth. He was born in 1840 in London and educated at Gravesend. At age 14, he arrived in Melbourne and had experience of station life in the country such as stock-riding and horse-breaking. He subsequently went gold mining at Ballarat and other places. He arrived in Canterbury in 1865 to join his brother Alfred, and they had a business for the short time to carry goods over the Port Hills (this was just prior to the opening of the Lyttelton Rail Tunnel). The brothers moved to Hokitika, where they worked as general merchants. Charles Louisson was associated with the Volunteers, as sergeant major of the Westland Light Horse. Louisson then moved to Marlborough for sheep farming, but the business was not lucrative. The brothers then moved to Southbridge and had a small farm there.

== Life in Christchurch ==
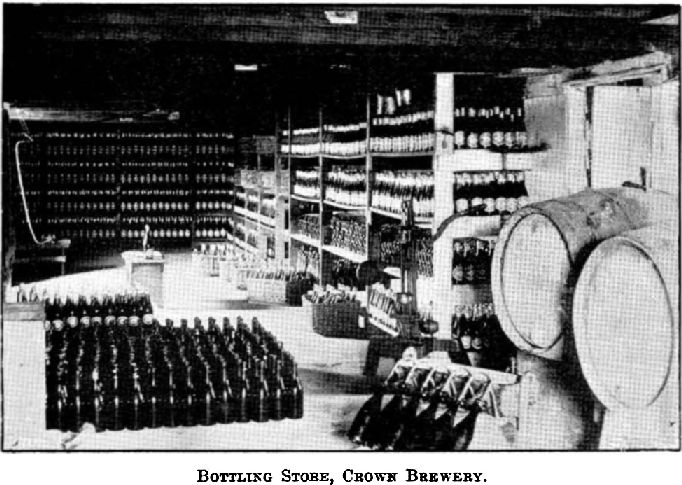
Bottling Store, Crown Brewery

Alfred and Charles Louisson returned to Christchurch in 1871 and they were joined by their brother Cecil. In 1871 or 1876(sources differ), the brothers first purchased a majority shareholding in the Crown Brewery Company and eventually obtained the remaining shares, with Alfred being the most shrewd business person of the trio. The site, on the corner of Antigua and St Asaph Streets in the Christchurch Central City, is still a brewery these days (the Canterbury Brewery), but has been closed since the February 2011 Christchurch earthquake and will be demolished. Louisson and his brother also owned a drapery and outfitting business, with branches in towns throughout New Zealand.

With Alexander Fergusson of the National Bank, he was a co-trustee of the Marks Benevolent Fund (these days called the Hyman Marks Trust), which supplied the main portion of the cost incurred in the erection of the Marks Ward at the Christchurch Hospital, amounting to £10,000. The foundation stone for the ward was laid by Fergusson and Louisson on 10 September 1896. The Marks Ward is today known as wards six and seven at Christchurch Hospital.

As a Freemason, Louisson held office for many years as District Grand Master for Canterbury under the Scottish Constitution. Louisson was the first president of the Christchurch Beautifying Association. He held leading positions in the Jewish congregation in Christchurch, e.g. treasurer.

On 3 July 1878 Louisson married Hannah Harris, the second daughter of Maurice Harris JP of Christchurch, at Beth El Synagogue. Louisson had known Maurice Harris for many years, as Harris also held leading positions at the synagogue, e.g. president of the Jewish congregation. They had two sons (Maurice George, born 26 May 1879; Cecil, born 3 June 1880) and two daughters (one of them born on 1 December 1881). The Louissons lived at 214 Gloucester Street for some years, and had at another time a house in Colombo Street designed by Joseph Maddison, one of Christchurch's leading architects.

== Political career ==
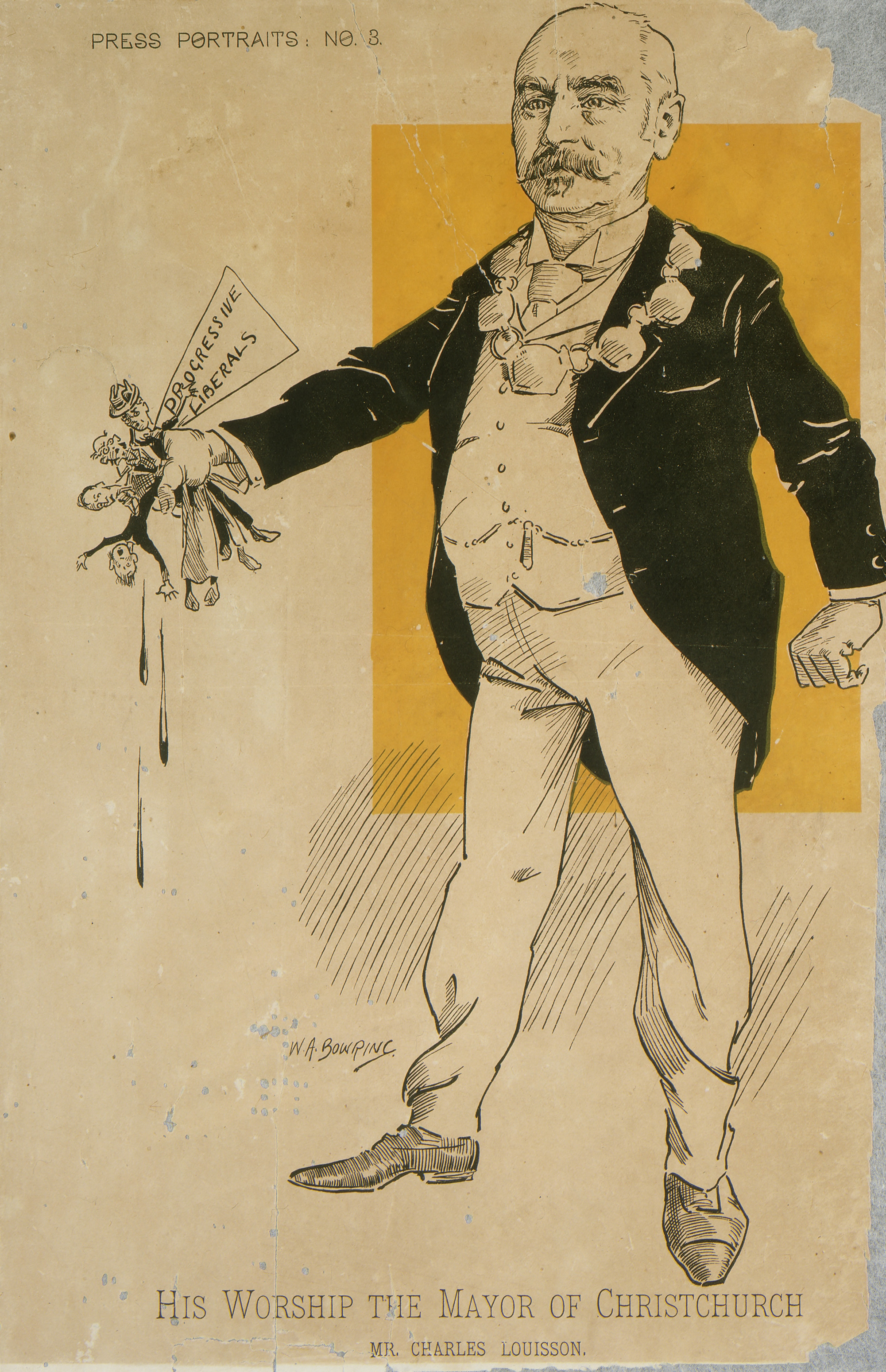
Charles Louisson caricature, 1899

Louisson entered into local politics as a member of the Christchurch City Council (CCC), in which he served for six years, and was mayor from 1887 to 1889, and again from 1897 to 1899.

He first stood as a councillor for CCC in 1881 in the South-west Ward. The other candidate, James Tait, formally withdrew from the election on 5 September, and Louisson was thus declared elected unopposed. Back then, each ward was represented by three councillors, and one of the councillors retired per year. Louisson was thus due to retire in 1884. On 4 September of that year, Louisson was the only candidate nominated in the South-west Ward, and he was thus declared elected. He retired at the end of the term in September 1887 and did not stand for re-election.

He first stood for the mayoralty in 1886, after a public request made by the other eleven councillors (including Samuel Manning, Samuel Paull Andrews, William Prudhoe and Charles Gray), nine ex mayors (John Ollivier, Henry Sawtell, Fred Hobbs, Henry Thomson, William Wilson, Charles Hulbert, James Gapes, John Anderson and George Ruddenklau) and 13 ex councillors (including Daniel Reese). It was the most keenly contested mayoral election thus far, and Louisson was narrowly beaten by the incumbent, Aaron Ayers, with 636 to 631 votes. Ayers retired at the end of his second term of mayoralty a year later, and Louisson decided to stand again. Eden George, who had just contested the Christchurch South electorate in the September 1887 general election (coming fourth against Westby Perceval) was requested by 227 ratepayers to contest the mayoralty. He declined by basically stating that Louisson was the stronger candidate. On election day (21 November 1887), Louisson was the only candidate and he was thus declared mayor elect. Louisson took the mayoral chair on 21 December 1887. At the end of the term, Louisson planned to retire, as he believed that the mayoralty should change every year. He was, however, prepared to make himself available if no other suitable person would contest the mayoralty. In the end, nobody else came forward and on 21 November 1888, Louisson was declared re-elected as the only contender. Louisson retired at the end of his second year, and Samuel Manning, as the only contender, was declared mayor elect on 21 November 1889 and installed in December 1889.

Louisson was again asked to stand for mayor in September 1897. He was elected unopposed on 16 November and installed on 15 December. Louisson was again approached by a delegation towards the end of his third term as mayor, urging him to stand again. Whilst he had wanted some other leading citizen to take on the role as mayor, he acceded to the request and his name was put forward. For a fourth time, Louisson was elected unopposed on 21 November 1898. Louisson was succeeded by William Reece, who was elected unopposed on 20 November 1899 and installed as mayor on 20 December 1899.

During his first mayoralty, Louisson acted as one of the Commissioners for New Zealand at the Melbourne International Exhibition. He was afterwards a member of the Charitable Aid Board and the North Canterbury Hospital Board, and official visitor of the Deaf and Dumb Institution at Sumner, and deputy inspector of the Sunnyside Lunatic Asylum. Louisson's services as mayor were recognised on two occasions by the citizens of Christchurch, who presented him in 1889 with a fine silver epergne, and again in 1899, on his retirement from the mayoralty, with an address and a silver tea service, and on each occasion the mayoress was presented with a diamond bracelet and star.

He was called to the Legislative Council on 22 December 1900. Since the Legislative Council Act 1891 had been in force, appointments were for seven-year terms. His first term ended on 21 December 1907, and he was reappointed on 14 January 1908. His second term ended on 13 January 1915, and he was reappointed over three years later on 7 May 1918. He served his third term until his death.

== Horse racing ==
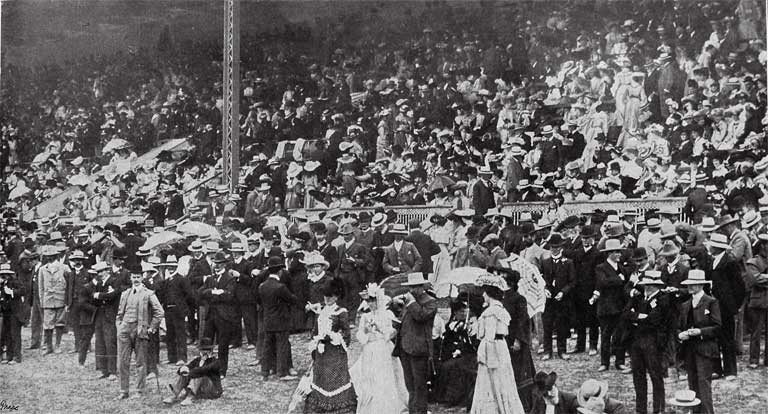
Addington grand stand in November 1903

He was a member of the Canterbury Jockey Club and a steward of the NZ Metropolitan Trotting Club (NZMTC) in Christchurch. From 1906 until his death in 1924, he was the president of the NZMTC. The trotting club used to be based at Lancaster Park in Waltham, and Louisson helped to obtain land in Addington, where Addington Raceway has been since 1899. The grounds were enlarged during his presidency. The Louisson Handicap was an annual race that was held for many years. Louisson donated the trophy for the New Zealand Trotting Cup, which he had manufactured in England. These days, the New Zealand Trotting Cup is considered Canterbury's biggest day on its social calendar.

== Death ==
Louisson, who towards the end of his life was living in Heaton Street in the suburb of Strowan, died on 19 April 1924. He was buried at Linwood Cemetery two days later. His wife died on 18 November 1928 at home and was buried two days later in the grave next to him. The Louissons were survived by their four children.

== Notes ==
Political offices
Preceded by Aaron Ayers	Mayor of Christchurch; 1887–1889; 1897–1899	Succeeded by Samuel Manning
Preceded by Walter Cooper	Mayor of Christchurch; 1887–1889; 1897–1899	Succeeded by William Reece
