= Linwood Cemetery, Christchurch =

Cemetery in Christchurch, New Zealand

Linwood Cemetery
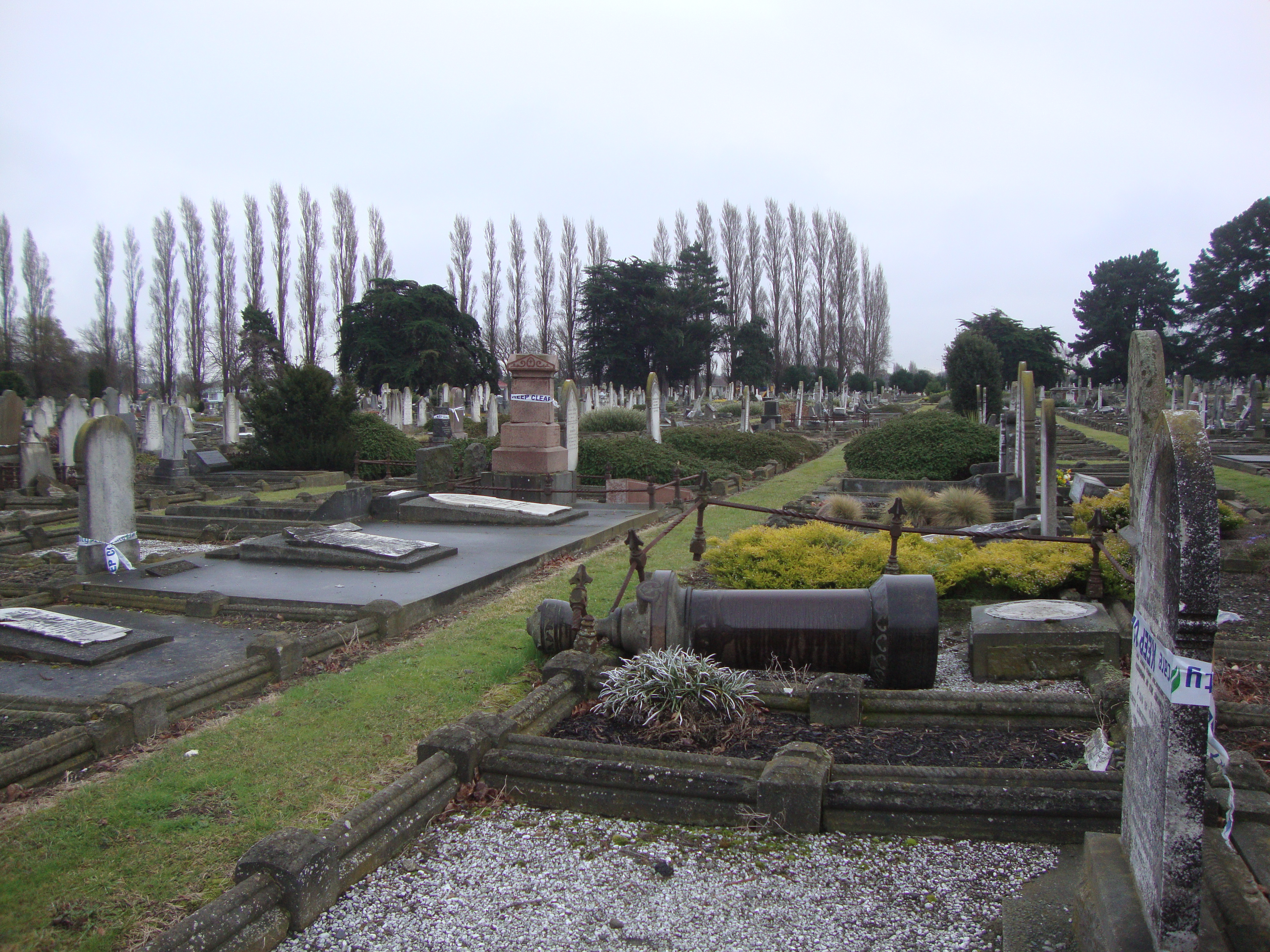
- Linwood Cemetery with some damage visible from the February 2011 Christchurch earthquake
- Interactive map of Linwood Cemetery

Details
- Location: Linwood, Christchurch
- Country: New Zealand
- Coordinates: 43.5299°S 172.6828°E
- No. of interments: 20,000+ records
- Website: www.linwoodcemetery.org.nz
- Find a Grave: Linwood Cemetery
- Footnotes: librarydata.christchurch.org.nz/Cemeteries/

Linwood Cemetery is a cemetery located in Linwood, Christchurch, New Zealand. It is the fifth oldest public cemetery in the city. Despite its age, it is still open for ashes interment, Hebrew Congregational burials and if there is space in existing family plots. Opened in 1884, it has seen some 20,000 burials. The first burial, of the Sexton's wife, was held in July 1884 before the cemetery was opened. For some years, a tram line stopped within the cemetery before terminating on what is now Pages Road. The tram lines going into the cemetery are still visible under the tar-sealed road leading from the Butterfield Avenue car park. A tram hearse was built at some expense for the time by the Christchurch City Council but is believed to have never been used.

The human remains from the Jewish Cemetery in Hereford Street were relocated to Linwood Cemetery after the Hebrew congregation sold the land of their earlier burial ground. A memorial to those re-interred was put in place but was badly damaged in the February 2011 earthquake.

After the removal of the Sexton's house in the 1980s, the cemetery was subject to neglect and vandalism. The Friends of the Linwood Cemetery, a charitable trust, was formed to preserve and maintain the site and promote it as a valuable heritage site for the city. The Christchurch City Council produced a Conservation Plan for the cemetery in 2006.

Linwood Cemetery is the resting place of a large number of notable residents. Those buried at Linwood Cemetery include 13 Christchurch mayors, several Members of Parliament, bishops and ministers, and the Peacock family whose philanthropy is associated with the iconic Peacock Fountain in the Botanic Gardens.

== Location ==
Linwood Cemetery is located in Butterfield Avenue, behind Bromley Park (off Buckley's Road), Christchurch. It is connected to the city centre and New Brighton by bus routes. There are a number of other cemeteries in this area, including the Bromley Cemetery and Woodlawns (which includes Bromley Crematorium). Both are often incorrectly called Linwood Cemetery because of their locations off Linwood Avenue.

== History ==
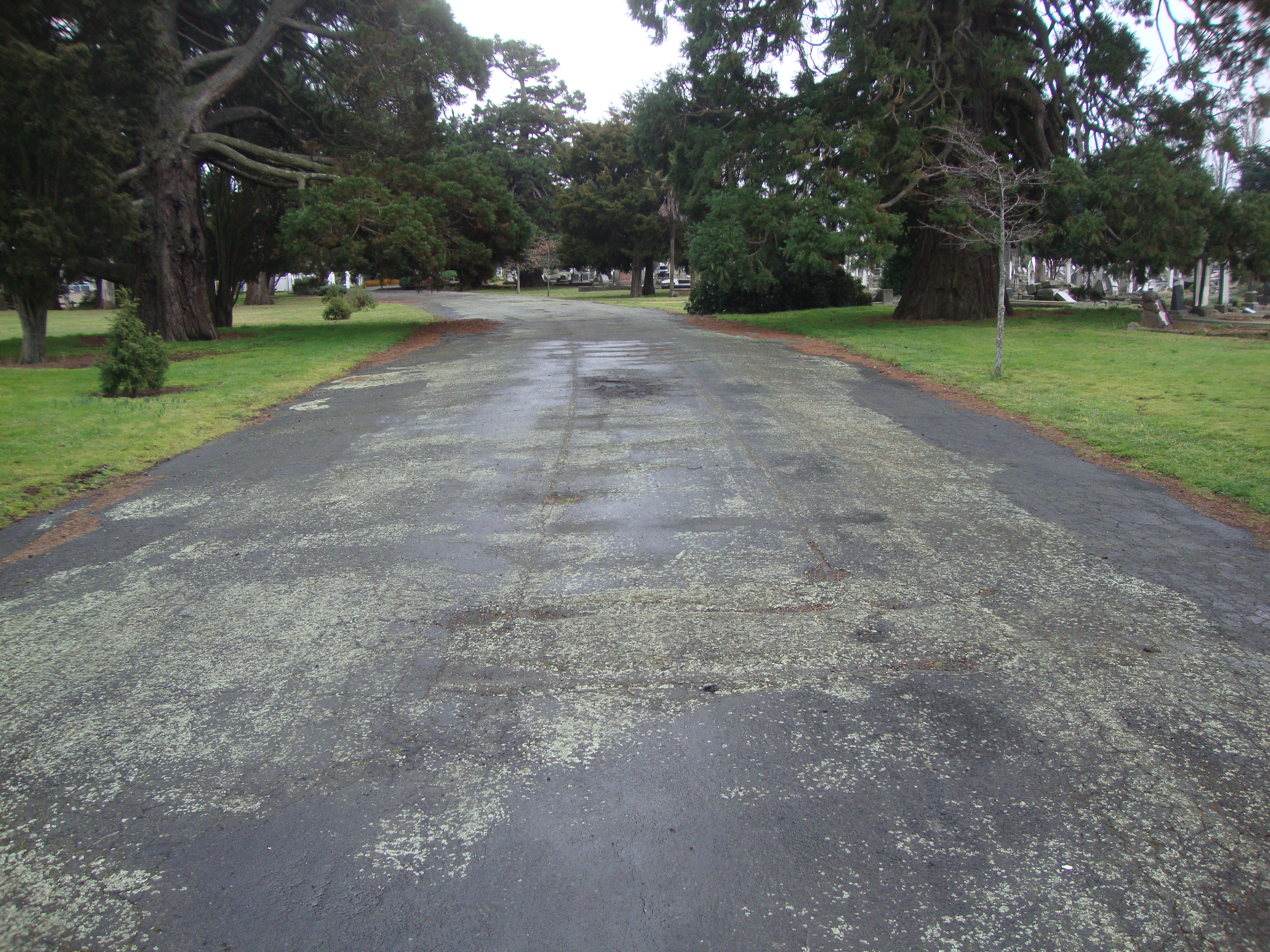
Faintly visible tram tracks in Linwood Cemetery

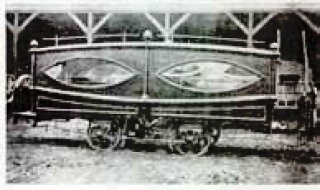
The Linwood Cemetery hearse tram

Linwood Cemetery is the fifth oldest surviving cemetery in Christchurch. It was opened in October 1884 as a response to concerns about the health implications of burying people in the inner city. The area where the cemetery was built was originally lupin-covered sand dunes well outside the city and near the Corporation rubbish dump. The land came under the jurisdiction of the Linwood Town Board which did not amalgamate with the city until 1903.

The first person buried in the cemetery was Sarah Freeman (Block 2 Plot 1), which is all the more significant as she was the Sexton's wife, and died in July 1884 whilst the cemetery was still being prepared. The funeral on 10 July was attended by the Mayor of Christchurch, Charles Hulbert, and several councillors.

After a lengthy debate, Linwood Cemetery was connected to the Christchurch tramway system. Approval for construction of the line was given in April 1885. Construction began on 26 November 1885 at Latimer Square and was completed by March 1886. The line was officially opened on 23 April 1886. Initially, it was the 'end of the line' from the city centre and people had to walk across or around the cemetery to connect with the tram line to New Brighton, which was run by a different company. By January 1887, the two lines had been connected. The city council had a tram hearse built for up to four coffins, with the intention of providing cheaper form of transport to the cemetery than what funeral directors would charge. The scheme was a failure and it is believed that the tram hearse was never used. In 1888, a council committee recommended that the rails into the cemetery be removed again and used elsewhere, but this was never acted on, and the rails, although sealed over, are still faintly visible. The tram hearse was bought by Samuel Paull Andrews for £3 and used as an explosives store in his St Andrew's Hill quarry.

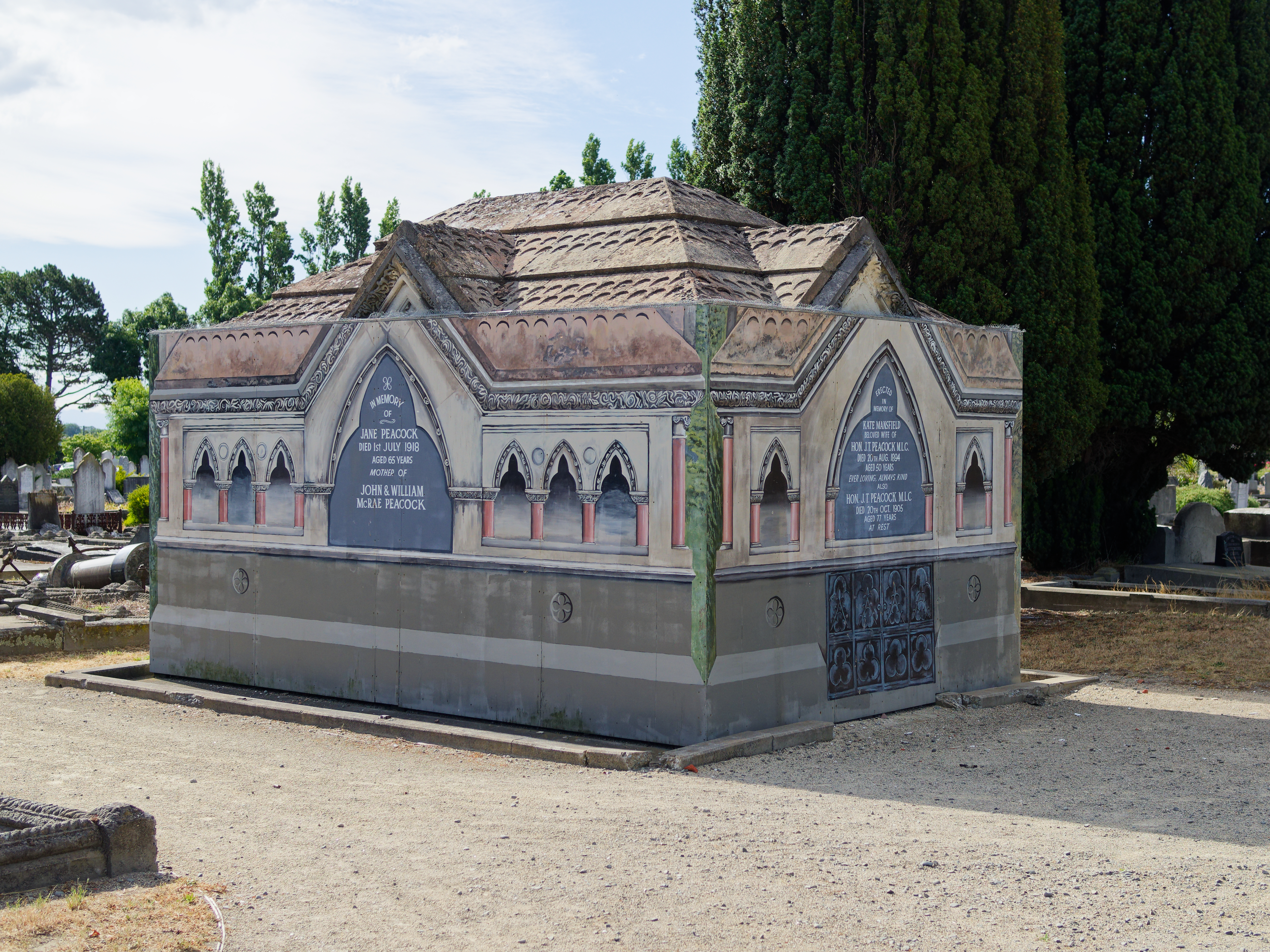
The Peacock Mausoleum at Linwood Cemetery

Members of the Canterbury Hebrew Congregation had purchased land in Hereford Street (in the section between Fitzgerald Avenue and Stanmore Road) for a Jewish cemetery. Between 1865 and 1890, 34 burials took place. The new Linwood Cemetery had a Jewish section, and the Hereford Street cemetery fell into disuse. By 1924, it looked "unsightly" and the Jewish congregation decided to shift the human remains to the Linwood Cemetery and sell the land. A legal issue stopped a land sale from going ahead and it required the passing of the Canterbury Jewish Cemetery Empowering Act 1943 to progress the issue. The remains were re-interred at Linwood Cemetery and a memorial marks the location with the following words: "Here repose the remains of the following that were removed from the Hereford Street Jewish Cemetery"

In 2005/06 a Conservation Plan was developed by the Christchurch City Council to evaluate the heritage value of Linwood Cemetery. As well as identifying Linwood Cemetery as of valuable heritage and green space value, the Conservation Plan describes the priorities and processes required to conserve the cemetery. The conservation plan is due to be revised in the near future.

A Sexton lived in a house in Linwood Cemetery until the early 1980s. From the late 1980s through to 1999, the cemetery fell into disrepair and nobody was looking after it, and vandalism was occurring. Since then, following a public meeting, a small group of local volunteers keep Linwood Cemetery tidy and promote its value as a much needed green space and heritage site.

The Friends of Linwood Cemetery Charitable Trust continue to research the history of Linwood Cemetery and undertake conservation work. The original research was carried out by local historian Richard Greenaway and can be found in Linwood Cemetery Tour.

The cemetery is almost full, with further burials possible in the children's, ashes, and Jewish sections only.

== The Friends of the Linwood Cemetery ==
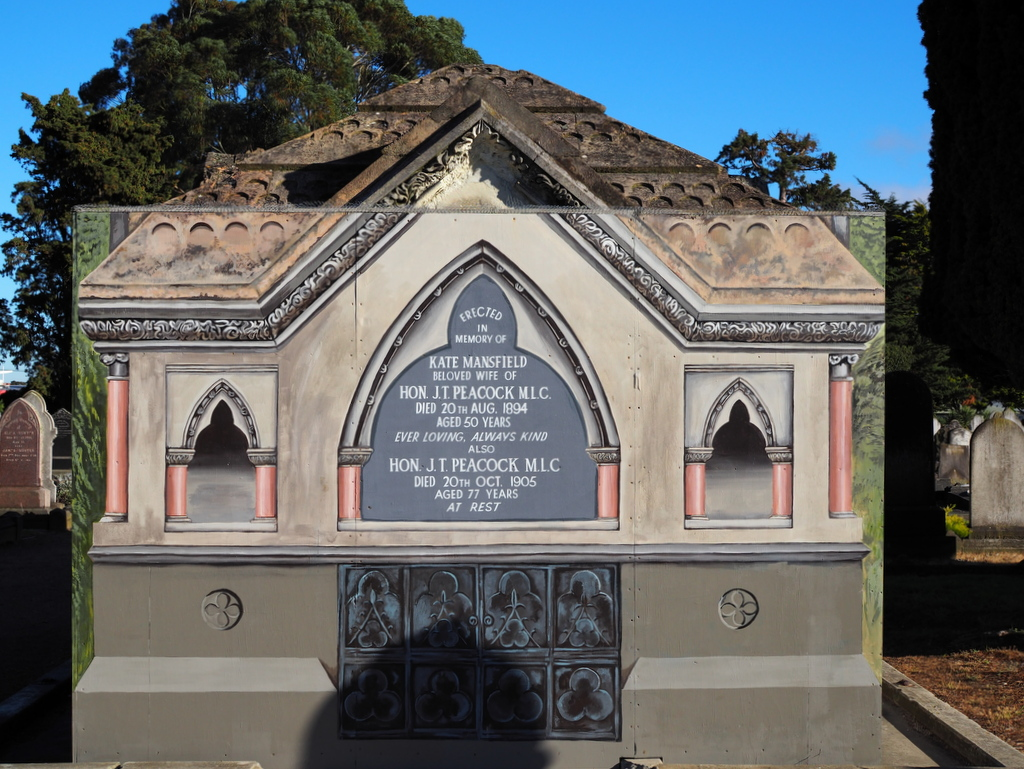
The trompe l'oeil on the Peacock Mausoleum in Linwood Cemetery, Christchurch.

Following recommendations in the Conservation Plan for Linwood Cemetery, local residents who had been tidying and gardening Linwood Cemetery as a Working Group since 1999 formed a charitable trust in November 2006. The Friends of Linwood Cemetery Charitable Trust organise regular working bees at the cemetery, record the condition of graves, record information about the cemetery and those buried in it on its own website, publicise the cemetery through articles and events and raise funds for projects to help preserve valuable heritage aspects of the cemetery. In November 2011 Dulux donated paint to the Trust to paint a trompe l'oeil of the Peacock Mausolem to cover the graffiti on a 'temporary' protective covering. The artwork was carried out by Anne Holloway, the chair at the time. The artwork was finished in August 2012. Bob Todd the Chair of the Hagley Ferrymead Community Board unveiled the artwork in a ceremony in May 2012 before the signwriting was completed by Digby Gemmel in the following months.

== Notable burials ==
Those buried at Linwood Cemetery include at least thirteen Christchurch mayors (see below), several members of parliament, bishops and ministers, and the Peacock family whose philanthropy included the Peacock Fountain in the Botanical Gardens. Many original settlers from the First Four Ships are buried here. 54 Commonwealth war graves (50 from World War I and 4 from World War II) and memorials to over 300 ANZACs are found at Linwood Cemetery. Linwood Cemetery is important not only for its notable person graves, but that everyone buried there is significant to the development of the Christchurch and New Zealand we know today.

Notable individuals include:

- Samuel Paull Andrews (1836–1916), Member of Parliament
- Edwin Blake (1830–1914), Member of Parliament
- De Renzie Brett (1809–1889), soldier, farmer and politician
- Thomas Davey (1856–1934), Member of Parliament
- Arthur Dudley Dobson (1841–1934), pioneer surveyor, engineer, and explorer after whom Arthur's Pass is named
- Thomas Edmonds (1858–1932), manufacturer of 'Sure To Rise" baking powder and publisher of New Zealand's best selling book, the Edmonds Cookery Book
- George Hart (1820–1895), Member of Parliament
- Leonard Isitt (1855–1937), Member of Parliament and prohibition advocate
- Joseph Ivess (1844–1919), Member of Parliament and newspaper proprietor
- Churchill Julius (1847–1938), second Anglican Bishop of Christchurch
- Robert McDougall (1860–1942), benefactor of the Robert McDougall Art Gallery
- Edith Mellish (1861–1922), founder of the Community of the Sacred Name
- John Thomas Peacock (1827–1905), businessman, philanthropist and politician
- Ebenezer Sandford (1848–1897), Member of Parliament
- Alfred Saunders (1820–1905) early settler, Member of Parliament, and author
- Henry Suter (1841–1918), zoologist

The following former Mayors of Christchurch, are buried at Linwood Cemetery:

- Aaron Ayers (1836–1900), 14th Mayor of Christchurch
- James Gapes (1822–1899), 9th Mayor of Christchurch
- Thomas Gapes (1848–1913), 20th Mayor of Christchurch
- Charles Gray (1853–1918), 17th Mayor of Christchurch and Member of Parliament
- Henry Holland (1859–1944), 31st Mayor of Christchurch and Member of Parliament
- Charles Hulbert (1841–1926), 13th Mayor of Christchurch
- James Jameson (1824–1896), 4th Mayor of Christchurch
- Charles Louisson (1842–1924), 15th Mayor of Christchurch and MLC
- George Payling (1854–1909), 27th Mayor of Christchurch
- William Prudhoe (1832–1908), 18th Mayor of Christchurch
- William Reece (1856–1930), 23rd Mayor of Christchurch
- Henry Thomson (1828–1903), 10th Mayor of Christchurch and Member of Parliament
- William Wilson (1819–1897), 1st Mayor of Christchurch
