= 1876 Christchurch mayoral election =

New Zealand mayoral election

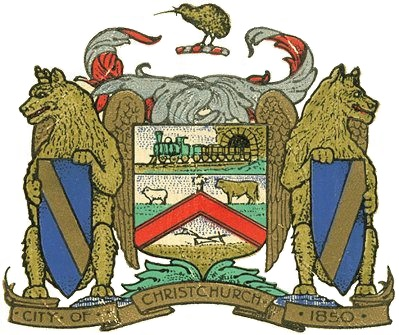
- 20 December 1876
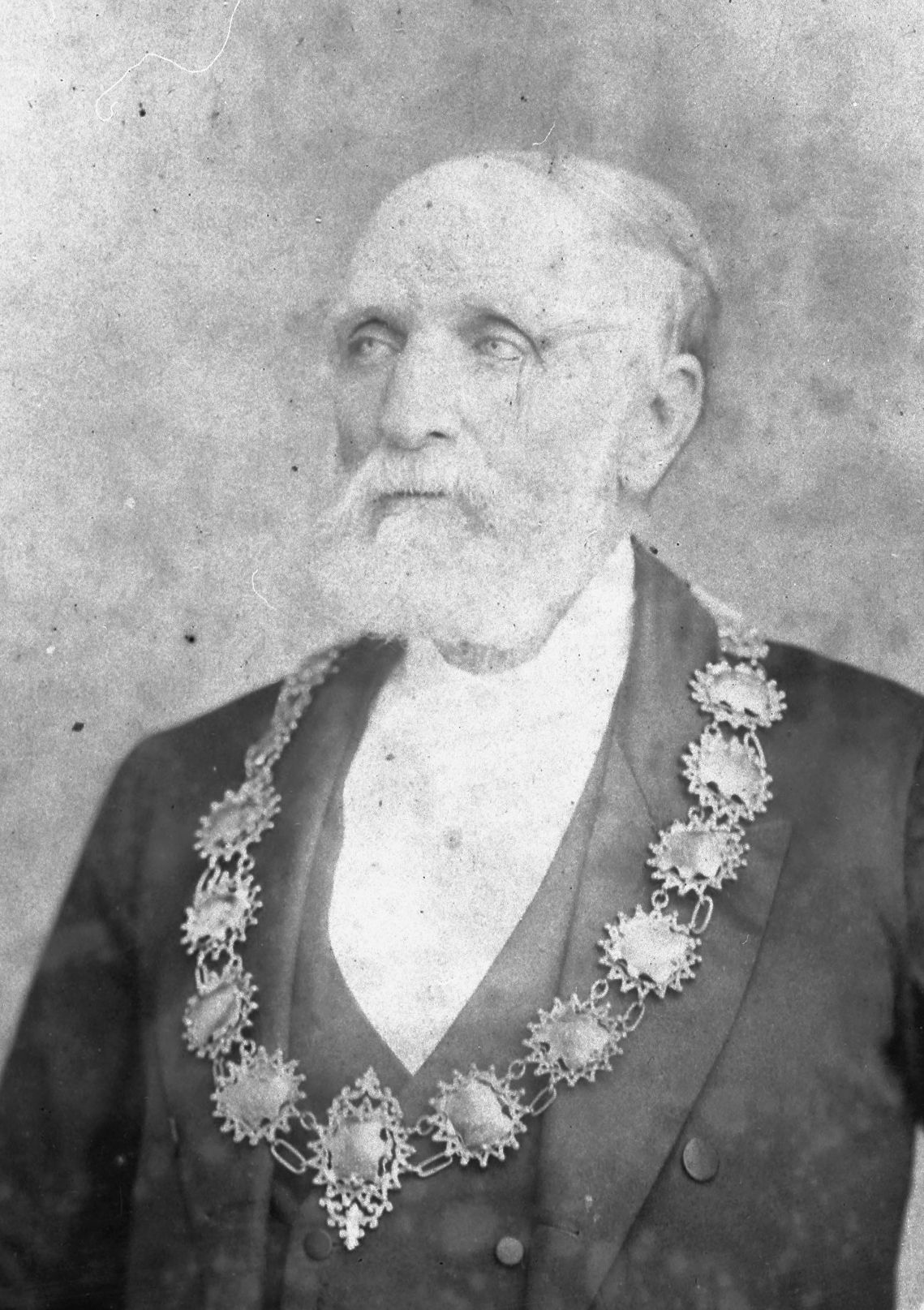

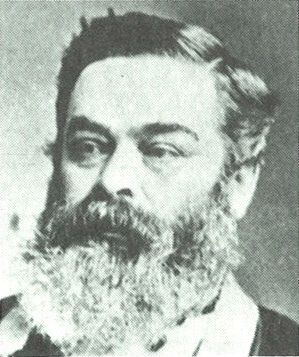
Candidate	James Gapes	Charles Thomas Ick
Party	Independent	Independent
Popular vote	680	515
Percentage	56.90	43.10
Mayor before election
Fred Hobbs
Elected mayor
James Gapes

The 1876 Christchurch City mayoral election was the first election for the Mayor of Christchurch held by public vote. The election, held on 20 December, was won by James Gapes, who beat fellow city councillor Charles Thomas Ick.

== Background ==
Initially, councillors elected one of their own as mayor towards the end of the year, and the role was usually awarded to the most senior councillor. The system changed with the introduction of The Municipal Corporations Acts Amendment Act, 1875, as that legislation stipulated that mayors had to be elected at large (i.e. by eligible voters). In December 1875, when the new act first applied, the incumbent mayor, Fred Hobbs, was the only candidate nominated. The returning officer, Edward Bishop, thus declared Hobbs elected unopposed on 17 December 1875. After having served two terms, it became known at the beginning of November 1876 that Hobbs would not seek election for a third term. This was regretted by one of the local newspapers, The Star, as they regarded him as having "discharged his duties with a thoroughness and zeal which will not be readily equalled by his successor." In the same editorial, the two eventual candidates were named. From December 1876 onwards, Leslie Lee acted as returning officer for mayoral elections for many years.

== Candidates ==
=== James Gapes ===
James Gapes was from Essex in England. He came to Christchurch with his wife, children, and a relative in 1859. They travelled as assisted immigrants, i.e. they were part of a supported immigration scheme and thus of humble origin. He started a glass, paint and paperhanging business in Victoria Street and was a member of many organisations. He was also known as a flutist, giving concerts together with Sir John Cracroft Wilson. Gapes was first voted onto Christchurch City Council as a city councillor in a February 1873 by-election.

=== Charles Thomas Ick ===
Charles Thomas Ick was an auctioneer by trade. He came from Otago to Christchurch in 1870. He was first elected as a city councillor in October 1872.

== Election ==
Eligible electors in Christchurch had their first opportunity to vote for a mayor on 20 December 1876. Gapes represented working class interests, whereas Ick represented the wealthier part of the population.

1876 Christchurch mayoral election
Party	Candidate	Votes	%	±%
Independent	James Gapes	680	56.90	
Independent	Charles Thomas Ick	515	43.10	
Majority		165	13.81	
Turnout		1,195		

Gapes won the election, and was sworn in as mayor at the next Christchurch City Council meeting on 2 January 1877. Gapes was defeated at the next mayoral election in December 1877 by Henry Thomson, but won another election as mayor in November 1880. Ick became mayor in November 1878 when he beat Thomson.
