= Frederick Hobbs (singer) =

Singer, actor and theatre manager

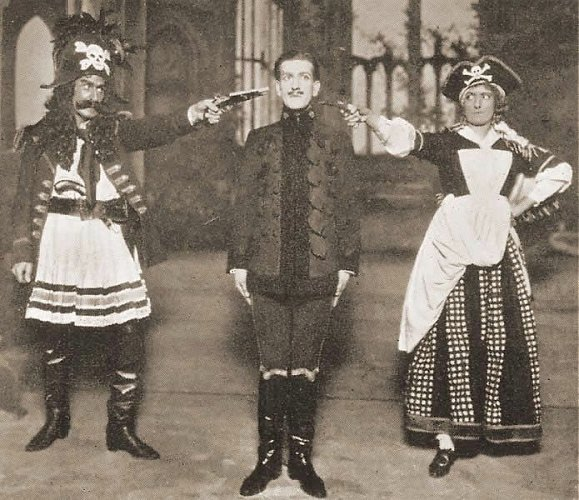
Hobbs (left) as the Pirate King, in 1919 performance of Pirates, with James Hay (Frederic) and Bertha Lewis (Ruth)

Frederick Henry Hobbs (29 July 1874 – 11 April 1942) was a New Zealand-born British singer, actor and theatre manager. After performing briefly as a concert singer in New Zealand and Australia, he moved to Britain, where he performed in opera and musicals. He joined the D'Oyly Carte Opera Company in 1914 and played leading baritone and bass-baritone roles in the Gilbert and Sullivan operas for six years. After touring in Australasia with the J. C. Williamson company for a year, he returned to London and became the stage manager for D'Oyly Carte in 1923 and its business manager from 1927 until his death.

== Early years ==
Hobbs was born in Christchurch, New Zealand, to a large family with a background in music. His parents were Fred Hobbs, who was Mayor of Christchurch 1874–1877, and Elizabeth (Bessie) Hobbs, née Murray. He had eight brothers and three sisters.

He trained as a singer and, early in his career, he received concert engagements throughout Australia and New Zealand. After moving to England in his twenties, he studied at the Guildhall School of Music and joined the Carl Rosa Opera Company, with whom he first appeared at the Grand Theatre in Islington. He later toured in Great Britain and South Africa in Edwardian musical comedies.

== D'Oyly Carte principal ==
Hobbs joined the D'Oyly Carte Opera Company in 1914, taking over many of the roles played by the departing Sydney Granville, including Colonel Calverley in Patience, Lord Mountararat in Iolanthe, Arac in Princess Ida, Pish-Tush in The Mikado, Richard Cholmondeley in The Yeomen of the Guard and Luiz in The Gondoliers. He soon added to his repertory the parts of Counsel to the Plaintiff in Trial by Jury, the Boatswain in H.M.S. Pinafore, and Samuel in The Pirates of Penzance. In 1916, he was given the role of Sir Marmaduke Pointdextre in the company's new production of The Sorcerer, giving up Luiz. Later that year, he swapped some of his smaller roles for larger ones: the Boatswain for Dick Deadeye in Pinafore, Samuel for the Pirate King in Pirates and Cholmondeley for Sergeant Meryll in Yeomen. He also continued to play Colonel Calverley, Mountararat, Arac and Pish-Tush, while adding Giuseppe in The Gondoliers and relinquishing the Counsel. His last new role, in 1918, was the title role in The Mikado. When D'Oyly Carte returned to the West End in London for its 1919-20 season, after 10 years on tour, Hobbs played Sir Marmaduke, Dick Deadeye, the Pirate King, the Colonel, Mountararat, Arac, The Mikado, Sergeant Meryll and Giuseppe. The Times called his Pirate King "terrific".

== Later years ==
Hobbs left the D'Oyly Carte company soon after it hired Darrell Fancourt in 1920. Hobbs then travelled to Australia, where he toured with the J. C. Williamson company in the Gilbert and Sullivan operas until 1921. In 1922, he was back in England, where he participated in a D'Oyly Carte recording of Pinafore, singing the part of Dick Deadeye in "Carefully on tiptoe stealing". That was the only recording he is known to have made.

Beginning in 1923, Hobbs moved backstage as stage manager of the D'Oyly Carte. In 1927, he became the company's business manager and served in that role until his death. Hobbs was married to Doris Cameron, a soprano who joined the D'Oyly Carte during his tenure there as a performer, and was a daughter of the actress Violet Cameron.

Despite ill health, Hobbs travelled with the Company in 1942. He fell ill and died in a nursing home in Norwich while on that tour, at the age of 67.
