= Charles Thomas Ick =

New Zealand politician (1827–1885)

Charles Ick
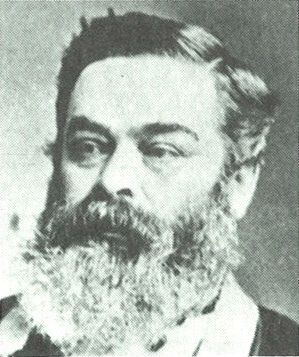
- Portrait of Charles Ick

11th Mayor of Christchurch
- In office 18 December 1878 – 15 December 1880
- Preceded by: Henry Thomson
- Succeeded by: James Gapes

Personal details
- Born: 9 January 1827 Shrewsbury, Shropshire, England
- Died: 27 April 1885 (aged 58) Papanui, Christchurch
- Resting place: Barbadoes Street Cemetery

Charles Thomas Ick (9 January 1827 – 27 April 1885) was Mayor of Christchurch, New Zealand, from December 1878 to December 1880. Born in Shropshire, he learned the trade of a mercer and draper. The Icks had five children when they emigrated to Otago in 1858. He worked in his learned trade in Dunedin for five years before becoming a farmer in Waikouaiti for seven years. In 1870, he came to Christchurch and set himself up as an auctioneer and later opened a drapery business.

== Early life ==
Ick was born in Shrewsbury, Shropshire, England in 1827. He was the only son of Joseph Ick, whose estate was known as Lady Halton. Ick married Jane Wainwright in 1849 and their children born in England were Stella, Hubert, Kate, Emily Jane, and Eliza Anne. The family emigrated to New Zealand on the Lord Worsley, arriving in Port Chalmers on 4 October 1858. They had further children in New Zealand.

== Professional life ==
Ick was in business in Dunedin as a mercer and draper, with his premises in Princes Street. In January 1862, he announced that he would no longer provide credit to his customers, but would offer cash deals only, as that would reduce prices for consumers. He leased his business premises in December 1862 and held a clearance sale during January 1863.

In 1863, he purchased a farm in Waikouaiti. Ick had a hunting accident in May 1867 where his own rifle discharged and shot him in the arm. He remained in Waikouaiti until 1870, first advertising his property for sale in April 1870. His stock and farm produce were auctioned on 26 May by Wright Stephenson.

Moving to Christchurch, he was an auctioneer from 1870 to 1882, when he retired. At first, he was in partnership with Thomas Preece, who had come out to New Zealand on the same ship as Ick. The business arrangement was terminated in August 1872. His auction rooms were in High Street opposite the City Hotel. He leased business premises from George Gould in Whately Road, and set up a drapery shop in a building he named Bradford House near the Victoria Bridge. The business opened on 1 February 1874.

== Political career ==
On 29 November 1862, Ick had a long advertisement in the Otago Daily Times about his inaugural election candidacy. He announced his political views for election to the High Ward of Dunedin's town board. The election was held on 1 December, but his name was not included amongst the candidates. In November 1863, Ick received a requisition asking him to stand in the Bell Ward for the town board. Of five candidates, Ick came fourth and was thus unsuccessful. In 1865, Ick was on the committee that secured the election of Thomas Dick as Superintendent of Otago Province.

While in Otago, Ick was chairman for five years in total of two road boards. He was on a town council, and chaired a district school committee. Ick resigned from those posts when he moved to Christchurch.

In September 1872, Ick received a numerously-signed requisition, requesting that he would stand for election to Christchurch City Council, to which he consented. Before 1916, elections for Christchurch City Council were held annually. Ick was elected onto the city council five times: in 1872, 1874, 1877, 1879 and 1880.

The mayor was for the first time elected by voters on 20 December 1876; until the previous year, the mayor was chosen from amongst the city councillors, and they usually elected the most senior councillor. The 20 December 1876 mayoral election was contested by James Gapes and Ick, with Gapes representing working class interests, whereas Ick represented the wealthier part of the population. Gapes and Ick received 680 and 515 votes, respectively, and Gapes was thus declared elected. Ick next stood for election as mayor two years later in 1878, challenging the incumbent, Henry Thomson. Ick defeated Thomson by 601 votes to 343 and was installed on 18 December of that year. Ick won the 1879 mayoral election against Aaron Ayers and Gapes. Ick did not stand again in 1880, and his successor, James Gapes, was installed on 15 December.

== Death and commemoration ==
He died on 27 April 1885, aged 58, at his residence in Papanui Road and is buried at Barbadoes Street Cemetery. His funeral was well-attended, with the current mayor, Charles Hulbert, and former mayors James Gapes, Henry Thomson, and George Ruddenklau as pallbearers.

Halton Street in Papanui is named after his father's estate.
