= De Renzie Brett =

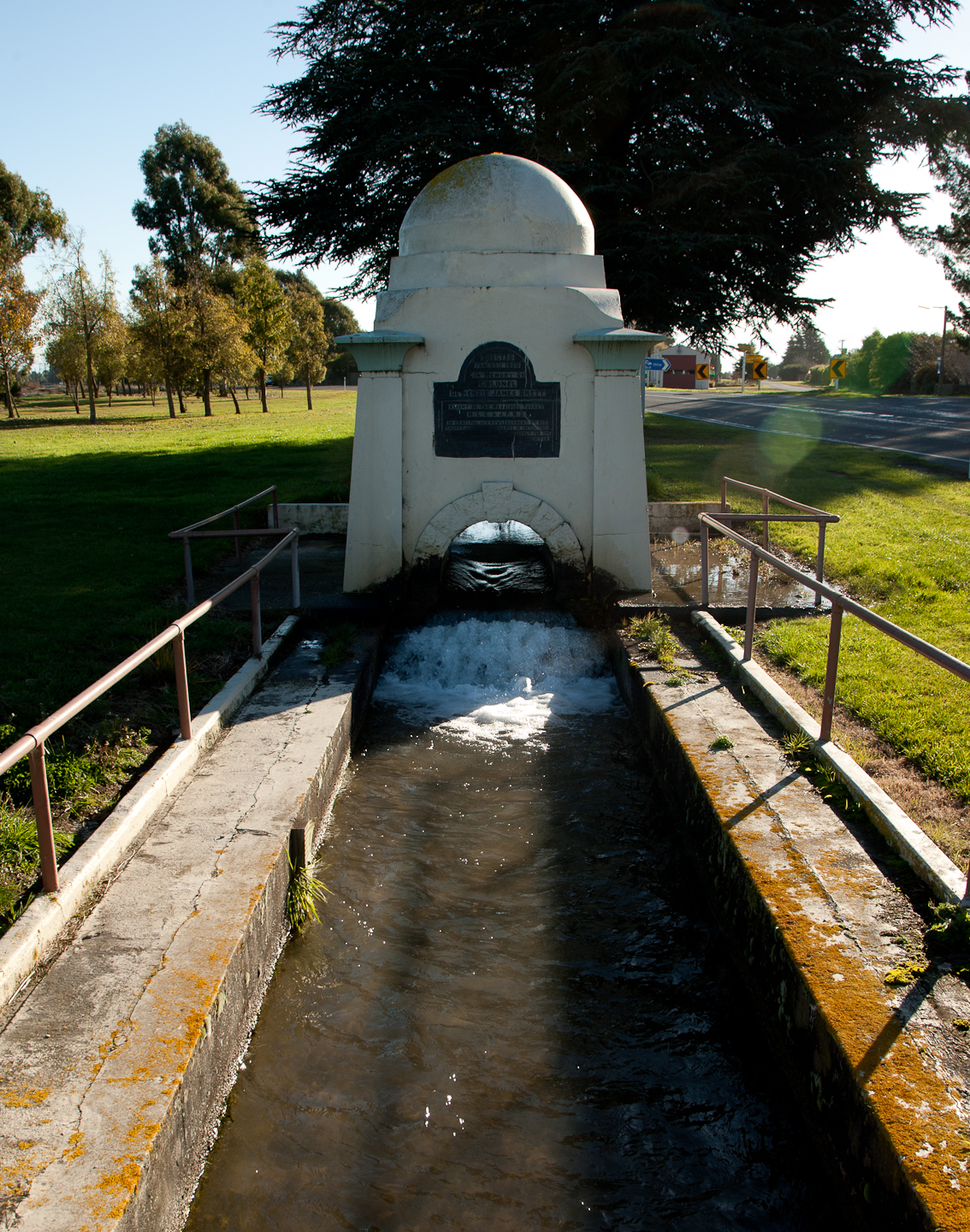
De Renzie Brett memorial in Kirwee

De Renzie James Brett (11 April 1809 – 16 June 1889) was a soldier, farmer and politician. He was a member of the New Zealand Legislative Council.

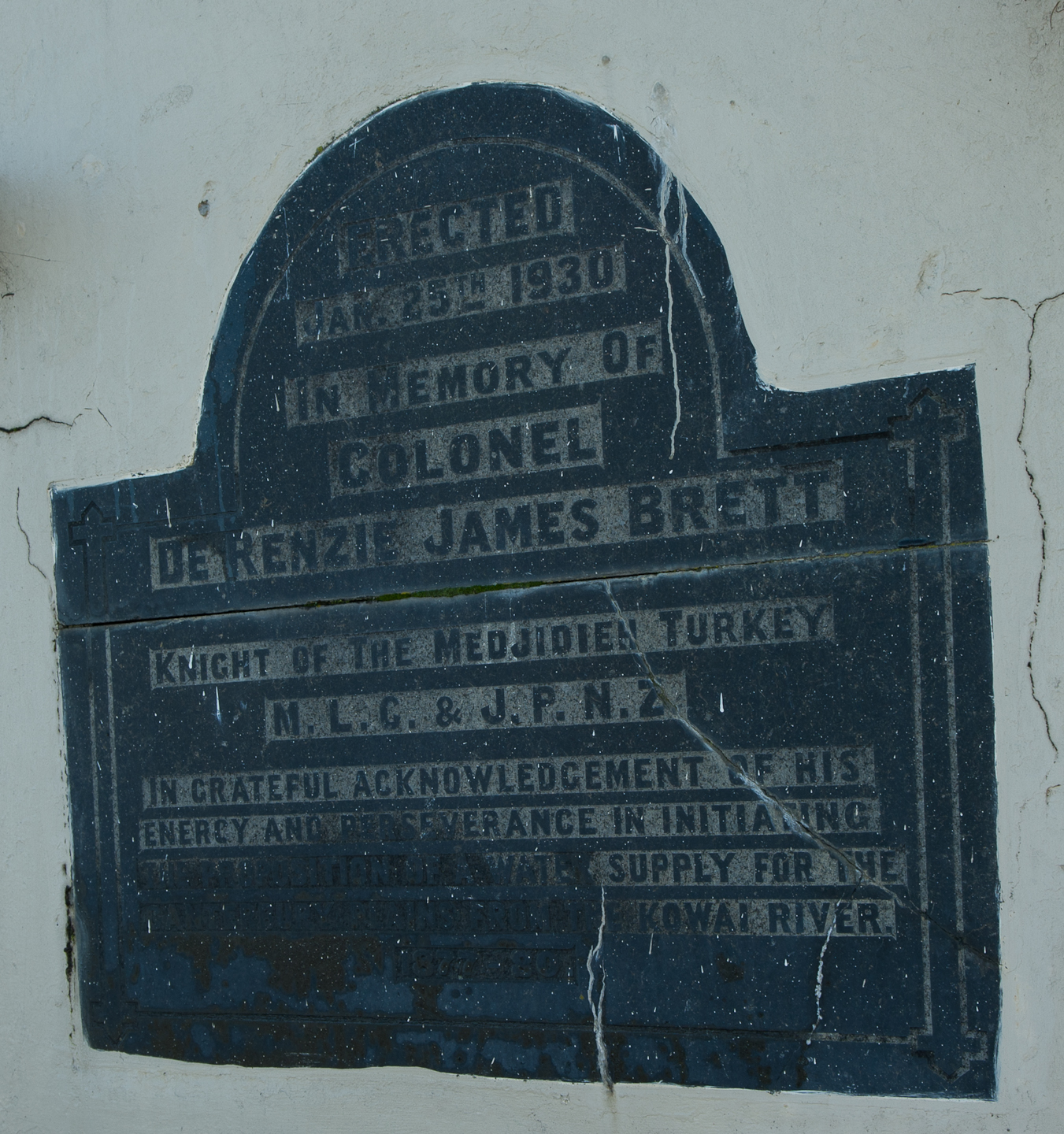
Detail of Kirwee monument

Brett was born at Wexford, County Wexford, Ireland, in 1809. He joined the British army as an ensign in 1825 and remained on full pay for the remaining 64 years of his life. He served in India during the Indian Mutiny and in the Crimean War as a brigadier-general.

Together with his family, Brett migrated to New Zealand on the Greyhound in May 1865. He represented the Selwyn electorate on the 6th Canterbury Provincial Council from 1870 to 1874. He was appointed to the Legislative Council on 3 July 1871 and served until his death on 16 June 1889 at Christchurch.

Brett is notable for having brought irrigation to inland Canterbury. He named his farm Kirwee and the township of that name developed around it. He is buried at Linwood Cemetery.
