= Thomas Gapes =

New Zealand politician (1848–1913)

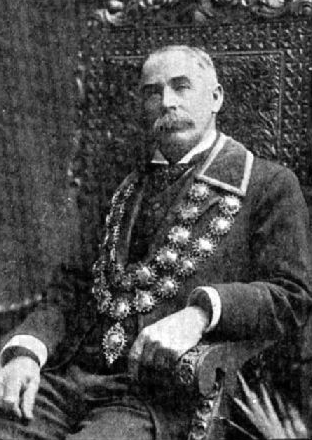
- Thomas Gapes wearing mayoral chains

20th Mayor of Christchurch
- In office 20 December 1893 – 19 December 1894
- Preceded by: Eden George
- Succeeded by: Walter Cooper

Personal details
- Born: 1848 London
- Died: 16 April 1913 (aged 64–65) Christchurch
- Resting place: Linwood Cemetery
- Relations: James Gapes (father); William Gapes (uncle)

Thomas Gapes (1848 – 16 April 1913) was Mayor of Christchurch 1893/94. His father James Gapes was twice mayor in the 1870s/80s. The family was of humble origin, had come out to New Zealand from London as assisted immigrants and were running a painting and paper-hanging business, but had come to status in their new country.

== Early life ==
Gapes was born in London in 1848, to James Gapes and his wife Jane (née Le Lean). His father had moved there from Saffron Walden in Essex. The Gapes family emigrated to New Zealand in 1859 when Thomas was eleven years old. The parents came out with their children and other relatives – Hannah (21 years), Charlotte (16 years), Mary (7 years), Angelina (5 years) and Emily (8 months), plus his father's cousin Lizzie Westwood (b. 1826 in Hertfordshire). They left Gravesend on 29 August 1859 and arrived in Lyttelton on 4 December 1859 on board the Regina.

Gapes received part of his education in London, and part of it in Christchurch.

== Professional life ==
Gapes worked in his father's painting and paper-hanging business in 71 Victoria Street, Christchurch. He took over the business in 1889 when his father retired.

== Political career ==
Before 1916, elections for Christchurch City Council were held annually. Gapes became a Member of the City Council in 1890 for the North-East Ward, was re-elected 1893, 1894 and was then represented from 1905 to 1913.

On 29 November 1893, Gapes contested the mayoral election against the incumbent, Eden George. George had been the youngest mayor so far (at the 1893 election, he was 30 years of age) and was the only mayor thus far who had not previously served as a councillor, that is he had not had any political experience. George had been ineffective as a mayor, and had been in conflict with the councillors. Gapes and George received 820 and 365 votes, respectively, which represented the largest majority in a Christchurch mayoral election at that time. Gapes was installed as the new mayor at a council meeting on 20 December and was mayor during 1894. During his mayoralty, he was involved with several relief and charitable funds, including for the sinking on 29 October 1894 of the SS Wairarapa, which was one of New Zealand's deadliest disasters.

The next mayoral election was held on 28 November 1894. Gapes stood again, and was challenged by two sitting councillors, Walter Cooper and Edward Smith. Cooper, Gapes, and Smith received 587, 364, and 246 votes, respectively. Cooper was thus declared elected and was installed as mayor on 19 December 1894.

== Family and death ==
On 23 February 1876, he married Marion (or Marianne) Elizabeth Prebble (24 September 1852 – 17 March 1919) at St Luke's Church in Christchurch. They had one daughter, Bertha Marion (29 January 1877 – 4 August 1954).

Gapes had come from a working-class background, but the family gained a high status in Christchurch. When the Canterbury edition of The Cyclopedia of New Zealand was produced, it was him who wrote the various entries for the Gapes family. As the Cyclopedia was vanity press, it gave Gapes the chance to downplay the family's humble background, and he focussed on their important associations in Christchurch.

Gapes died at his Christchurch residence on 16 April 1913, aged 65, and was buried at Linwood Cemetery. His wife, Marion Elizabeth Gapes, died on 17 March 1919, aged 65.

Civic offices
| Preceded by Eden George | Mayor of Christchurch; 1893–1894 | Succeeded by Walter Cooper |
