= Henry Thomson (New Zealand politician) =

New Zealand politician (1828–1903)

Henry Thomson JP
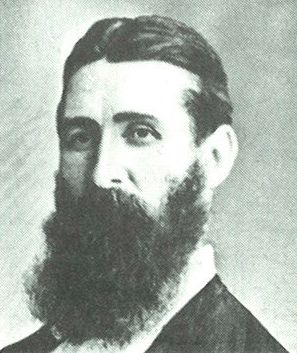
- Portrait of Henry Thomson

Member of the New Zealand Parliament for Christchurch North
- In office 9 Dec 1881 – 27 Jun 1884
- Preceded by: new electorate
- Succeeded by: Julius Vogel

10th Mayor of Christchurch
- In office 19 Dec 1877 – 18 Dec 1878
- Preceded by: James Gapes
- Succeeded by: Charles Thomas Ick

Personal details
- Born: 1828 Dumfriesshire, Scotland
- Died: 13 September 1903 (aged 74–75) Christchurch, New Zealand

Henry Thomson JP (1828 – 13 September 1903) was a 19th-century Mayor of Christchurch and Member of Parliament for the Christchurch North electorate in Canterbury, New Zealand.

== Early life ==
Thomson was born in Dumfriesshire, Scotland, in 1828. He was the fifth son of William Thomson, a shipbuilder. He received his education at Wigtown, Galloway, Scotland. At age 18, he started work for the Liverpool and Manchester Railway.

In 1852, he left after six years to emigrate to Victoria, Australia. Thomson was clerk-in-charge of the office of the Melbourne and Hobson's Bay railway during its construction. He was afterwards superintendent of the wharf and railway station at Sandridge (now called Port Melbourne).

In 1856, Thomson came to Wellington, and a year later moved to Nelson. On 28 April 1859, he married Mary Ann Thomson (née Coates), daughter of Giles Coates, at Christ Church in Nelson. After two years in Nelson, he had a short experience on the Otago gold fields, and in 1865 settled in Christchurch, where he was employed by the jewellers Coates and Co., the company of his father in law. He later became a partner in the firm. On the death of Giles Coates, he became the sole proprietor until 1891, when he retired from business. In 1868, Thomson was manager of the Canterbury section of the New Zealand railways, which then extended from Lyttelton to Selwyn as the Canterbury Great South Railway.

== Political career ==
New Zealand Parliament
| Years | Term | Electorate | Party |
|---|---|---|---|
| 1881–1884 | 8th | Christchurch North | Independent |

Before 1916, elections for Christchurch City Council were held annually. Thomson was elected onto the town and later city council five times: in 1867, 1868, 1875, 1878 and 1880.

The town council held a meeting on 10 June 1868 to elect its first mayor. In those days, the councillors elected one of their group as mayor, i.e. the position was not elected at large (by the voting public) as is the case today.

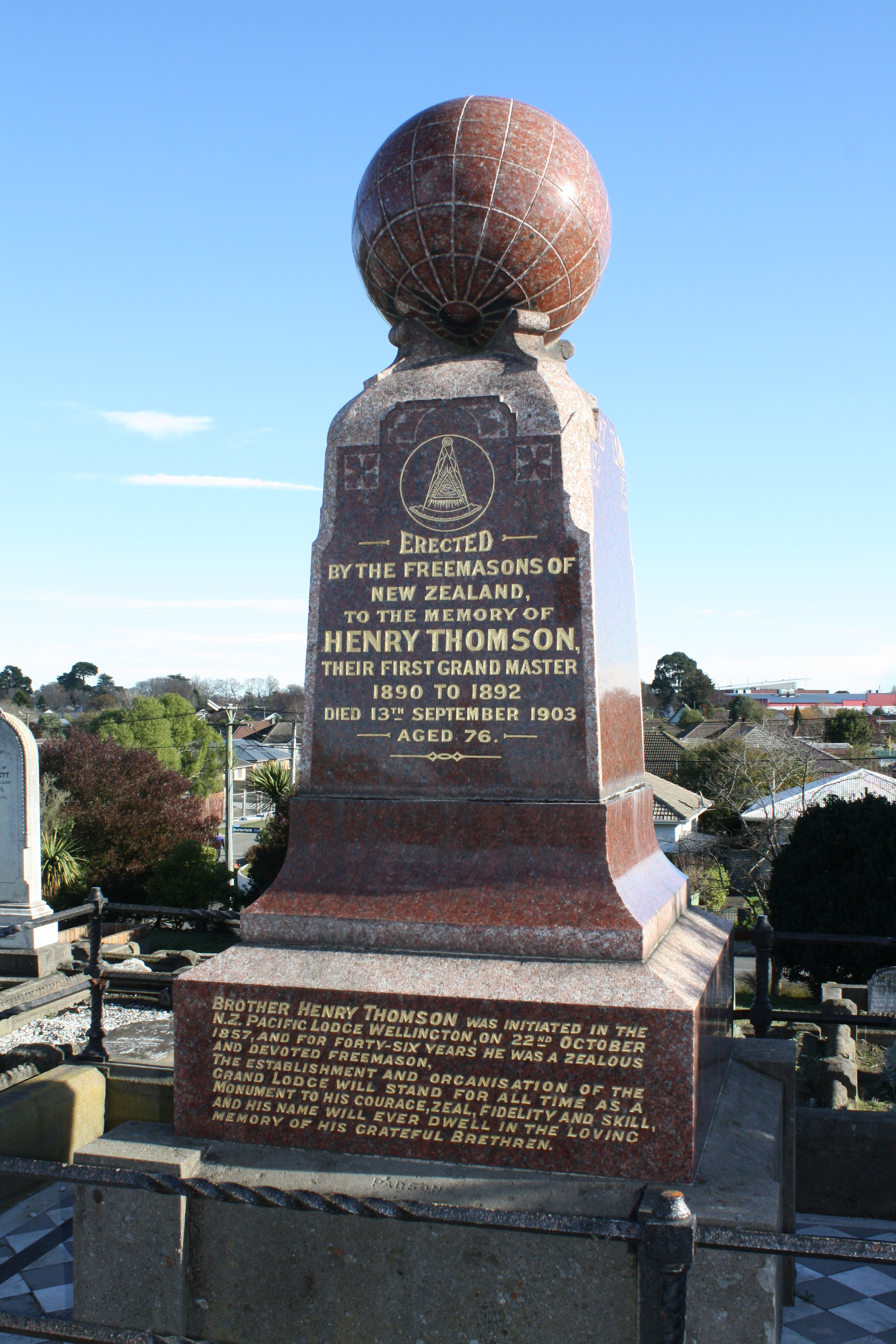
Henry Thomson's grave at Linwood Cemetery

The following councillors attended the meeting: William Wilson, James Purvis Jameson, T. Tombs, George Ruddenklau, Henry Thomson, W. A. Sheppard, W. Calvert and John Anderson, who chaired the meeting. Thomson moved that Wilson be elected as the first mayor of Christchurch, and Tombs seconded the motion. The chairman put the motion to the meeting and it was carried unanimously. With the meeting, the council had brought itself under the Municipal Corporations Act 1867.

At the end of 1877, Thomson stood for Mayor of Christchurch against the incumbent, James Gapes. Gapes declared that he would not have wanted to oppose a city councillor standing for the office of mayor, but that he stood to clear up his reputation, as unwarranted accusations had been made against him. Thomson, over the course of the election campaign, started to believe that he would not have a chance at the election. The result was very close, with Thomson receiving 474 votes against 461 votes for Gapes. The returning officer declared Thomson elected at the evening of the election day (28 November 1877). Thomson was installed as mayor at a meeting on 19 December 1877. Thomson's election caused a vacancy on the City Council. The only candidate for the by-election was James Jameson, who was thus declared elected unopposed.

Thomson stood for re-election against the senior councillor Charles Thomas Ick. Ick defeated Thomson by 601 votes to 343.

He represented the Christchurch North electorate from 1881 to 1884, when he retired. He was a supporter of the Atkinson Ministry.

Westby Perceval, Aaron Ayers, Thomson and Eden George contested the Christchurch South electorate in the 1887 election. Perceval won the election and Thomson came third.

== Death ==
Thomson died on 13 September 1903. He was buried at Linwood Cemetery.

== Notes ==
New Zealand Parliament
| New constituency | Member of Parliament for Christchurch North; 1881–1884 | Succeeded by Julius Vogel |
Political offices
| Preceded by James Gapes | Mayor of Christchurch; 1878–1879 | Succeeded by Charles Thomas Ick |
