= Fred Hobbs (mayor) =

New Zealand politician

Fred Hobbs JP
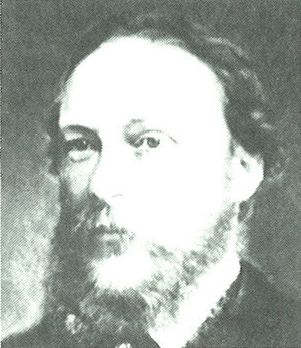
- Portrait of Fred Hobbs

8th Mayor of Christchurch
- In office 16 December 1874 – 2 January 1877
- Preceded by: Michael Hart
- Succeeded by: James Gapes

Personal details
- Born: 17 December 1841 Hambleden, Buckinghamshire, England
- Died: 13 May 1920 (aged 78) Waitati near Dunedin, New Zealand
- Spouse: Bessie Murray
- Relations: Frederick Hobbs (son)

Frederick (Fred) Hobbs JP (17 December 1841 – 13 May 1920) was Mayor of Christchurch, New Zealand 1874–1877 for two terms; he was the first mayor who served more than one term. He is credited with having made significant improvements to the drainage system, and thus improving health in the wider Christchurch area. Upon his lobbying, The Christchurch District Drainage Act 1875 was passed, and Hobbs became the first chairman of the Christchurch Drainage Board. The family were tailors and the location of their business premises in the north-east quadrant of Cathedral Square gave the area the name of Hobbs' corner. Fred Hobbs commissioned a new building of permanent materials for the site, which became known as Cathedral Chambers and which stood there from the mid-1880s to the 1970s. The locality changed name to Broadway corner, based on the popular café that occupied the first floor; this name is no longer in use in Christchurch.

The Hobbs family was known for singing. Fred Hobbs was involved in establishing at least two choirs in Christchurch, and his son Frederick Henry Hobbs worked for the English D'Oyly Carte Opera Company.

== Early life ==
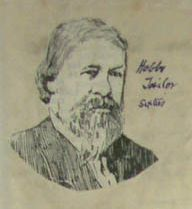
William Hobbs, the father of Fred Hobbs, during the 1860s

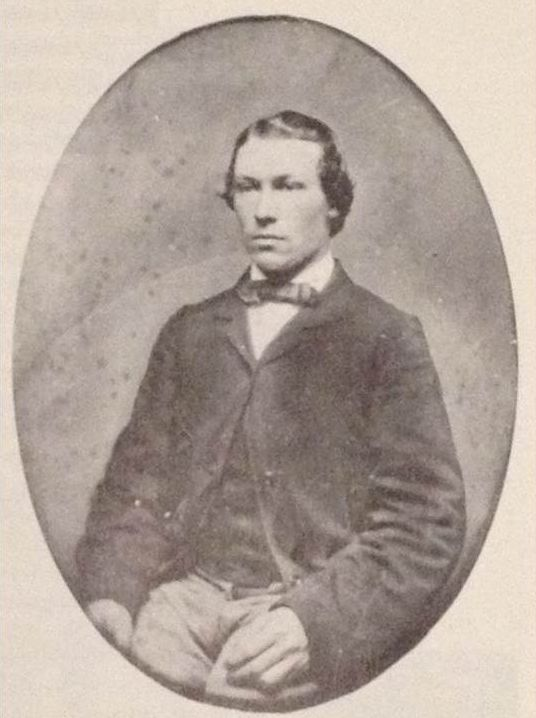
Fred Hobbs at age 18

Hobbs was born in Hambleden, Buckinghamshire, England, in 1841. His parents were William (Bill) Hobbs and Maria Hobbs (née Streek). The family knew George Gould senior (father of George Gould, the later director of The Press), who was an early immigrant to Christchurch. The letters that Gould senior sent home encouraged the Hobbs family to emigrate to Christchurch.

The family with four children emigrated to New Zealand on the Caroline Agnes, and arrived in Lyttelton on 17 August 1855.

Fred Hobbs had three siblings:

- William Alfred Hobbs (4 March 1838 – 12 August 1903), his older brother, married in 1862 at Holy Trinity Avonside and died at Timaru.
- Anne (Annie) Hobbs (13 November 1839 – 27 December 1900), his only sister, married the publican Jesse Hall of the Eastern Hotel (Cashel Street, Christchurch) and died at the hotel; she is buried at Linwood Cemetery.
- Francis (Frank) Hobbs (3 December 1844 – 20 January 1918), his younger brother, died in Christchurch and is buried at Linwood Cemetery.

Hobbs was 13 when he left England; he received no further formal education in Christchurch, where the family settled.

== Professional life ==
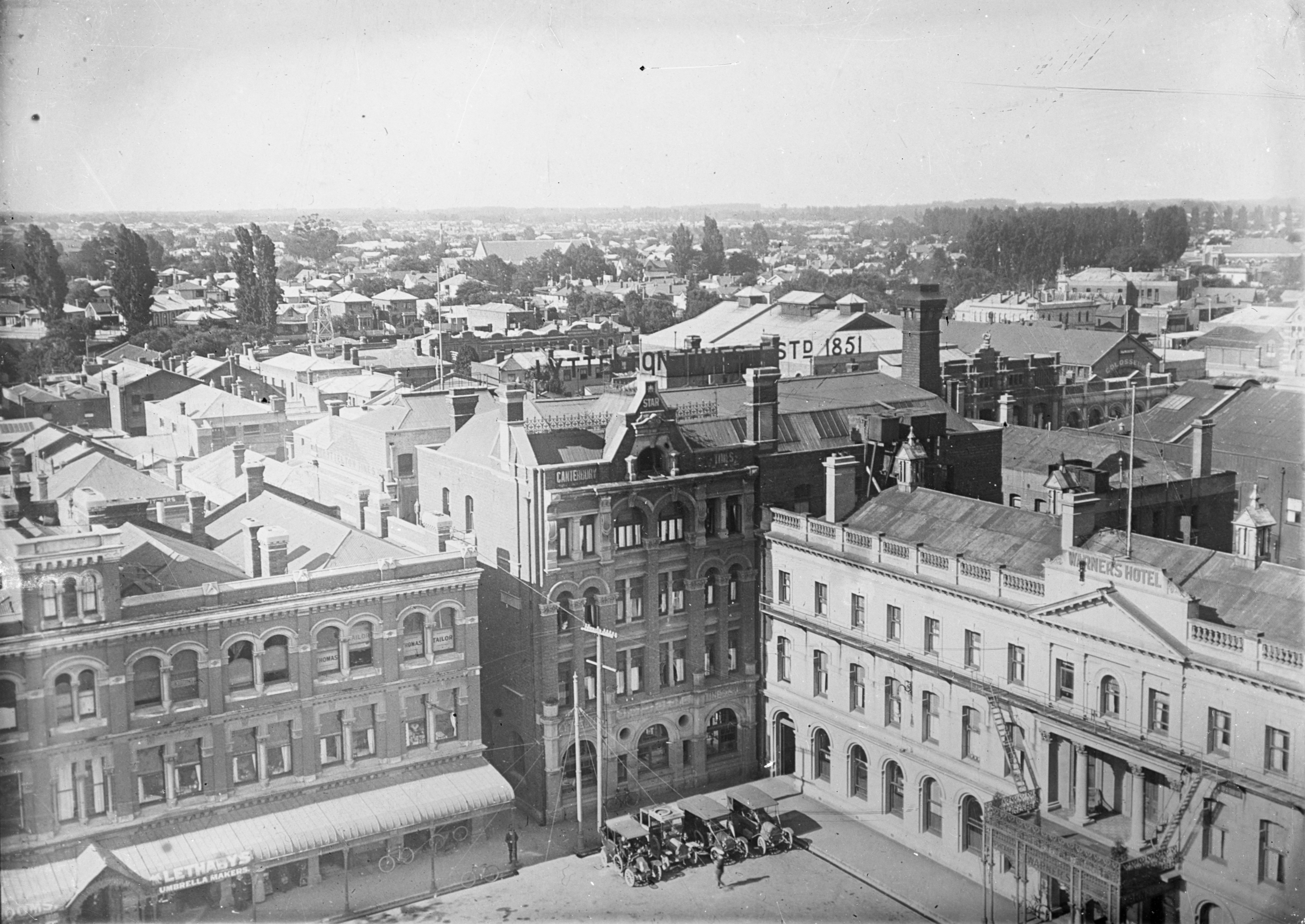
Cathedral Chambers, the Lyttelton Times Building, and Warner's Hotel (from left) in circa 1910

The Hobbs family had a business as tailors and woollen drapers. From 1858, they advertised as 'Hobbs & Son', and this changed to 'Hobbs & Sons' in August 1862. Whilst his father had come out to New Zealand to do manual labour, the demand for clothing was so great that he soon went back to his old trade. They leased the top floor of a building in the north-east quadrant of Cathedral Square, with a frontage to Colombo Street. The business name was prominently painted onto the weatherboard. Although the building was leased, it became known as Hobbs' Building, and over time, the north-east quadrant of the Square became known as Hobbs' corner (the latter name first appearing in the newspapers in 1868).

Partners in the business were Fred Hobbs, his father William, and his brother William Alfred. The partnership was dissolved in August 1872, and his brother continued managing the branch in Timaru on his own account. The Christchurch business continued as 'Hobbs and Co', and at the time of the death of the company's founder in May 1878, it was the oldest business in Christchurch.

In 1883, Hobbs and Co announced that they would replace the wooden building with a three-storey masonry structure. The building was designed by William Armson and was known as Cathedral Chambers. Hobbs' corner became known as Broadway corner, based on the popular café that occupied the first floor. Cathedral Chambers was in turn replaced by the CML Building in 1975.

== Political career ==
Before 1916, elections for Christchurch City Council were held annually. Hobbs was elected onto the city council four times: in 1870, 1873, 1875 and 1876.

At the Christchurch City Council meeting on 16 December 1874, a new mayor was elected. The councillors decided unanimously on Hobbs as the successor to Michael Hart. Shortly after his election, Hobbs was sworn in as a Justice of the Peace.

One of the dominant issues at the time was illness caused through poor drainage and open sewers. Just after the election, The Press devoted a detailed and long editorial to the topic, urging the council to act and to devise a solution that would not just address the issue in Christchurch, but also in the suburbs, which at the time were all under the control of separate councils. They praised Hobbs for the initiative that he had already shown as a councillor. Indeed, Hobbs invited suburban and local bodies to a conference in 1875 to tackle the issue in a comprehensive manner.

The work and lobbying of Hobbs was instrumental in the establishment of The Christchurch District Drainage Act 1875. When the drainage board first met on 4 January 1876, Henry Tancred was proposed as chairman. H. J. Hall proposed Hobbs, not because he was the current mayor of Christchurch, but because of his lobbying on the drainage question. After some discussion, the original motion was withdrawn, and Hobbs became the first chairperson of the Christchurch Drainage Board.

During Hobbs' first term in office, The Municipal Corporations Acts Amendment Act, 1875, was passed, and this legislation stipulated that mayors had to be elected at large (i.e. by eligible voters). Hobbs was the only candidate nominated, so the returning officer, Edward Bishop, declared him elected unopposed on 17 December 1875.

After having served two terms, Hobbs did not seek election for a third term. This was regretted by one of the local newspapers, The Star, as they regarded him as having "discharged his duties with a thoroughness and zeal which will not be readily equalled by his successor." The mayor was for the first time elected by voters on 20 December 1876.

The 20 December 1876 mayoral election was contested by James Gapes and Charles Thomas Ick, with Gapes representing working class interests, whereas Ick represented the wealthier part of the population. Gapes won the election, and was sworn in as mayor at the next Christchurch City Council meeting on 2 January 1877.

In September 1883, a deputation asked Hobbs to run for a position on the city council again. He stood in the South-East Ward against the incumbent, Charles Kiver. Despite having the support of the influential John Ollivier and The Star newspaper, Kiver had a significant majority with 751 votes to 393.

Hobbs was regarded as outspoken, and he was a man of strong opinions. In an editorial, The Star described him thus:

We admire the blunt, outspoken honesty of purpose which Mr Hobbs possesses in an eminent degree. Everybody, we imagine, will admit that he forms his own opinions on men and things, and that those opinions are fearlessly stated and acted upon when occasion serves.

Later in 1883, it is said that Hobbs "seems to have faded from the scene".

== Community involvement ==
Hobbs was a founding member of the choir of St John the Baptist Church. He was also a founding member of the Christchurch Liedertafel, a choir founded in 1885 that still exists today. For the Liedertafel choir, he acted as treasurer and librarian.

== Family and death ==
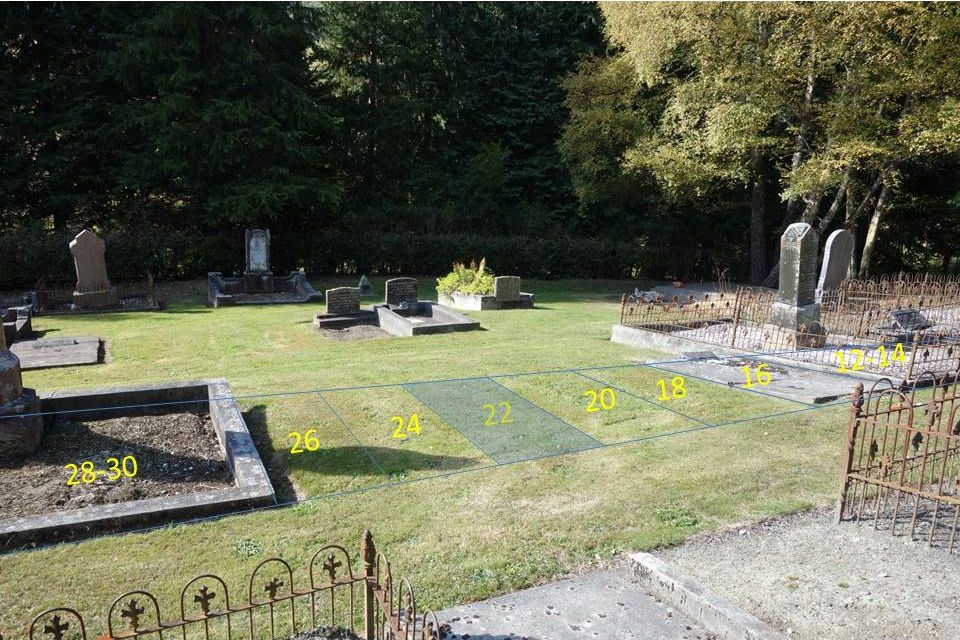
Waitati Cemetery, with plot 22 the unmarked grave of Fred Hobbs

On 5 July 1866, Hobbs married Elizabeth (Bessie) Hobbs (née Murray) at St John's Church, Ferry Road, Woolston. His wife was born on 17 April 1846 in Taunton, England. They had nine sons and three daughters:

- Edith Mary Hobbs (17 April 1867 – ?)
- Francis William (Harry) Hobbs (24 March 1869 – 1 March 1958 in Christchurch)
- Miriam Ellen Hobbs (15 March 1871 in Christchurch – 18 April 1957 in Christchurch)
- Lewis Frederick Charles Balfour Hobbs (1 February 1873 in Taunton, England – May 1873 in Taunton)
- Frederick Henry Hobbs (29 July 1874 in Christchurch – 11 April 1942)
- John Leonard Hobbs (29 August 1876 in Christchurch – ?)
- Charles Hubert Hobbs (20 March 1878 in Christchurch – 10 July 1957 in Christchurch)
- Reginald James Hobbs (1 October 1879 in Christchurch – 14 February 1994)
- Hugh Septimus Hobbs (9 November 1880 in Christchurch – 6 February 1963 in Christchurch)
- Kenneth (Keith) Murray Hobbs (3 January 1882 Christchurch – September 1882 in Christchurch)
- Bessie Gertrude Hobbs (24 April 1883 Christchurch – 24 December 1974)
- Alan Edgar Hobbs (8 December 1887 Christchurch – 21 December 1973), who got married at Holy Trinity Church in Devonport, Auckland.

The Hobbs family had a musical background. Fred Hobbs was well known as a singer; his cousin J. W. Hobbs was a tenor in England who trained William Hayman Cummings. His son Francis William, known as Harry, was also known for his singing. His son Frederick Hobbs made an international career and worked with and then for the D'Oyly Carte Opera Company. The 1858 jury list shows the Hobbs family as living in Armagh Street. In 1875, the family was living in Gloucester Street opposite Christchurch East School.

Fred Hobbs died at Waitati near Dunedin on 13 May 1920. He is buried at Waitati Cemetery in block 10 plot 22. His grave is unmarked.

== Sources ==
- NZ Federation of University Women (1995). Round the Square : A History of Christchurch's Cathedral Square. Christchurch: Clerestory Press. ISBN 0-473-03399-2.

Political offices
| Preceded by Michael Hart | Mayor of Christchurch; 1874–1877 | Succeeded by James Gapes |
