= Leslie Lee (New Zealand politician) =

New Zealand politician and farmer (1814–1897)

The Honourable Leslie Lee
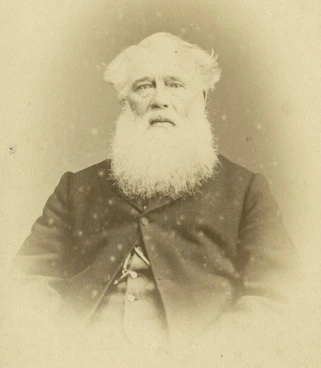
- Lee (year unknown)

Member of the New Zealand Legislative Council
- In office 24 July 1862 – 8 November 1870

Personal details
- Born: George Leslie Lee; 1814
- Died: 15 September 1897 (aged 83) Avonside, Christchurch, New Zealand
- Resting place: Avonside Cemetery, Holy Trinity Avonside
- Spouse: Maria Fuller (m. 1856)

George Leslie Lee (1814 – 15 September 1897) was a member of the New Zealand Legislative Council from 1862 to 1870. A farmer by trade, he held significant land holdings. He acted as electoral officer in many elections in Canterbury.

== Early life and career ==
Lee was born in 1814. His parents were John Benjamin Lee and Amelia Lee (nee Knyvett) from Middlesex. He arrived in Lyttelton on the Stag on 2 August 1852. As Charlotte Godley had earlier written that he was "detained in England with a sick wife" but then arrived by himself, it is assumed that his first wife had died. Lee bought the Highfield sheep run, which adjoined the later town Waiau in North Canterbury. He sold Highfield in 1864 and bought Stoke Grange instead, which was split off from the Fernside run held by Charles Torlesse.

== Political career ==
Lee represented the Amuri electorate in the Nelson Provincial Council from 8 October 1855 to 16 December 1856. He was a member of the New Zealand Legislative Council from 24 July 1862 to 8 November 1870, when he resigned. Soon after buying Stoke Grange, Lee stood for the Rangiora and Mandeville Road Board, and easily won the election in July 1864. Lee represented the Oxford electorate on the Canterbury Provincial Council from April 1867 to October 1870. He was a member of the Executive Council from 10 June 1868 to 4 June 1869. He was the returning officer for many elections in the wider Christchurch area.

Lee resigned all his positions in October 1870 as he went bankrupt, but the case never went to court.

== Private life ==
On 21 May 1856 at Kaiapoi, Lee married Maria Fuller, the daughter of Lt-Col Fuller CB of Oxfordshire. After his bankruptcy, they first lived at Styx Mill and then Avonside. When the secretary of the Provincial Council resigned, Lee was one of seven applicants and was selected by the elected members in the first ballot with a clear majority.

Lee died on 15 September 1897 at his home in Avonside at age 83. He was survived by his wife; they had no children. Lee was buried at Avonside Cemetery, which belongs to Holy Trinity Avonside.
