= George Ruddenklau =

New Zealand politician (1829–1891)

John George Ruddenklau JP
- Johann George Rüddenklau
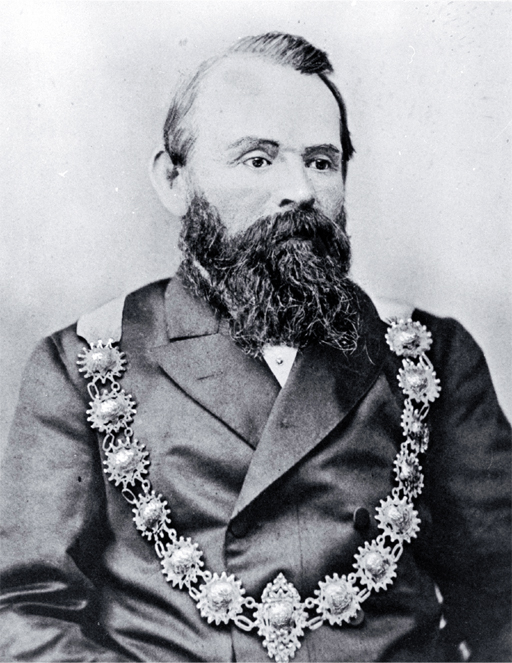
- Ruddenklau wearing mayoral chains

12th Mayor of Christchurch
- In office 21 December 1881 – 19 December 1883
- Preceded by: James Gapes
- Succeeded by: Charles Hulbert

Personal details
- Born: 23 May 1829 Niedermeiser, Hesse, Germany
- Died: 15 December 1891 (aged 62) Addington, Christchurch, New Zealand
- Profession: Baker

John George Ruddenklau JP (23 May 1829 – 15 December 1891) was Mayor of Christchurch from December 1881 to December 1883. A baker from Germany, he was later the proprietor of the City Hotel. He was very active with a number of organisations, founded the German Benefit Association, and was the driving force behind the establishment of the German Church.

== Early life ==
Johann George Rüddenklau was born in Niedermeiser on 23 May 1829 and baptised two days later. His birth name was later Anglicised by adopting John as his first name, and dropping the umlaut from his surname. Niedermeiser is today a suburb of Liebenau in the district of Kassel, in Hesse, Germany. His parents were John Ruddenklau and his wife, Annie Gertrude Ruddenklau (née Engelbrecht). The eldest of five children, he had two brothers and two sisters. John George Ruddenklau often signed documents and was referred to as J. G. Ruddenklau, but he was known by his middle name and he used George Ruddenklau in print when he needed to differentiate from his brother John.

Ruddenklau was apprenticed as a baker. He moved to London in 1850 or 1851 where he continued to work in his profession. He was joined in London by his younger brother John Ruddenklau (Johannes Rüddenklau; 30 August 1834 – 16 May 1896), who worked there for some years before returning to Germany. John Ruddenklau, who had also trained as a baker, emigrated to New Zealand in 1856, and arrived in Lyttelton on the Joseph Fletcher in October 1856. He took up farming; first in Rangiora and then in Cust.

In circa 1853, George Ruddenklau married Sarah Ann Workman in London. Their only child, Fanny Gertrude Ruddenklau, was born in 1854 in London. The family left London in 1857 to emigrate to Canterbury in New Zealand, following his brother. Historian George Macdonald has recorded that they arrived by the Bosworth, but the passenger list published by the Lyttelton Times on 23 December 1857 mentions his wife and daughter only.

== Life in New Zealand ==
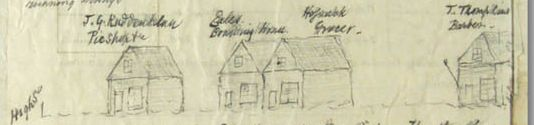
Original houses between High and Colombo Streets in the early 1860s: Ruddenklau, Eales Boarding House, Hopsack (grocer) and T. Thompkins (baker)

Ruddenklau opened a bakery at the northern end of High Street, i.e. where it meets Colombo and Hereford Streets, on 7 May 1859; the premises were leased from William Wilson. In early 1861, he enlarged his premises and started selling cordials and other goods. In June 1861, he applied for a wine and beer licence. Ruddenklau gradually took over the four shops at the end of High Street facing the triangle that has since 2008 been known as Stewart Plaza and which for many decades held the Stewart Fountain. In August 1861, he opened the City Wine Vaults with his newly gained alcohol licence, and the bakery shifted around the corner into Colombo Street nearer to Cashel Street. At the same time, Ruddenklau entered into a partnership with James S. Hawley that lasted until July 1863. When the annual renewal of his alcohol licence was discussed in April 1863, Ruddenklau was told that he had to complete the building that he had shown the resident magistrates, or otherwise he could not expect a renewal the following year.

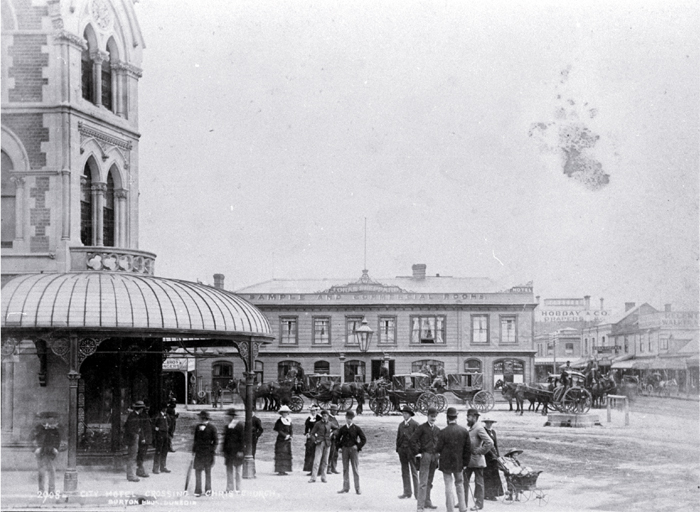
Hansom cabs and carriages in front of the City Hotel in 1884

Exactly a year later, Ruddenklau opened the two-storey City Hotel on the site. Its frontage covered the whole length between Colombo and High Streets. Only two months later, a fire broke out in a building on the opposite side of Colombo Street and due to the night being very still, the fire could be contained by cutting a fire break through the block. In total, 14 houses were lost. At one point, the heat was so great that the fire ignited a building across the road, situated next to the City Hotel, but the fire service could quickly extinguish the flames. Yet another fire occurred in pretty much the same location in June 1867 and this time, the heat caused damage to Ruddenklau's building.

In June 1864, Ruddenklau was elected president at the annual meeting of the Licensed Victuallers' Association. In December 1864, a gas network was installed in Christchurch, and the City Hotel was one of the first premises that made use of the new source of light. Only two months later, Ruddenklau had to defend a breach of the Public House Ordinance for failing to keep the entrance lamp of his hotel lit during the prescribed hours. On this occasion, the proprietor got cautioned by the resident magistrate Charles Bowen, but in September 1866, he was fined NZ£1 for the same offence. In August 1866, Ruddenklau enlarged the City Hotel premises. He engaged his fellow Christchurch city councillor, architect Samuel Farr, to design an adjacent brick building facing Colombo Street. Upstairs, a billiard room was fitted with a table acquired from John Thomas Peacock, one of the richest people in Christchurch. In 1867, Ruddenklau was one of the founders of the Canterbury Brewing, Malting and Distilling Company that was to be chaired and directed by George Oram, the eldest of five brothers working in the hotel industry. Ruddenklau retired from business in August 1869 and sold his hotel to John William Oram, the second-oldest of the Oram brothers (Matthew Oram, the son of their third brother, was their nephew).

In late 1871, Ruddenklau was the founder of the German Benefit Association. The object of the association was for Germans to support each other during times of sickness or distress. With those objectives closely related to religion, it wasn't long before it was proposed to build a church for German Protestants. Funds were raised by a committee presided by Ruddenklau, and in November 1872, the foundation stone of the German Church was laid. Ruddenklau travelled to Germany in February 1873 and among other duties, he found a pastor and arranged transport for the three bells that the church building committee had requested from the German Chancellor, Otto von Bismarck. Ruddenklau returned with a pastor, Rev. L. Lohr, on the Rakaia in April 1874, and the church was formally opened on 14 May 1874. The bells arrived later that month, but a new bell tower had to be built, and it was not before Christmas Eve of 1874 that the bells were inaugurated.

== Political career ==
Ruddenklau first stood for election for Christchurch City Council in January 1866; city councillors were elected for two-year terms at the time. Five people contested the four available positions, and Ruddenklau came fourth and was thus successful, just one vote ahead of the person who came last. 1866 proved to be one of the most difficult years for Christchurch City Council over its entire history. A ratepayer revolt nearly bankrupted the city council. Ruddenklau, during the 16 April weekly meeting, started the discussion on why the council was continuing to employ a labour force, and by the end of the meeting, councillors had resolved to lay off their labour staff. Later in the year, the city's drainage scheme was abandoned and the pipes, imported from London, sold off. As a consequence, Christchurch's reputation as the "most polluted and unhealthy city" in New Zealand was retained for another 20 years. In January 1868 when Ruddenklau's term came to an end, four positions on the city council had to be filled. Eight candidates stood for election, and the four retiring members were all re-elected. In addition, one councillor had resigned, and two candidates stood to replace him. On 15 January, a day after the nomination meeting, the poll was held between 10am and 4pm as one (i.e. covering both the retiring and the resigned positions). Ruddenklau came fourth and was thus successful. One of the defeated candidates was Michael Hart, who would later become mayor of Christchurch. A protest by one of the unsuccessful candidates that two separate polls should have been taken came to nothing.

James Gapes announced on 25 November 1881 his candidacy for a third term as mayor, as he was not satisfied with the other two contenders for the position, the timber merchant Charles Benjamin Taylor, and Ruddenklau. However, on 28 November, Gapes advertised that he had withdrawn from the contest. The election was won by Ruddenklau on 30 November, possibly helped by the support of The Star just prior to the election. Ruddenklau was installed as the next mayor on 21 December 1881.

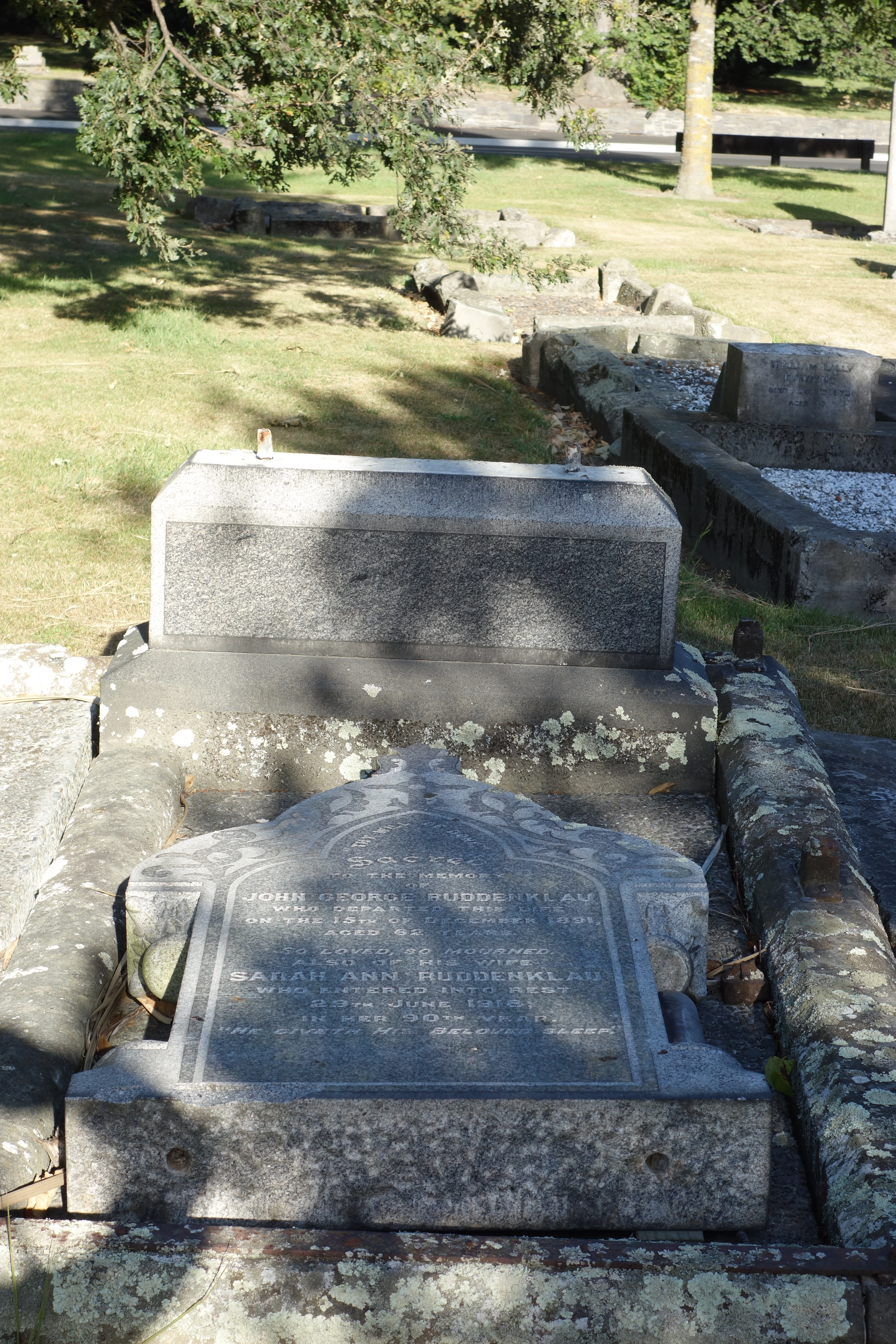
The Ruddenklau family grave in Barbadoes Street Cemetery, with the headstone toppled in the 2011 Christchurch earthquake

In September 1882, Ruddenklau received a deputation led by ex-mayor James Jameson, supported by ex-mayors Charles Thomas Ick and Fred Hobbs and many other influential citizens, urging him to stand for second term. Ruddenklau consented and two months later, he was returned elected unopposed.

Ruddenklau decided to retire in 1883 after two terms as mayor. One of the last public duties carried out by Ruddenklau was to open the Armagh Street Bridge on 11 December 1883. Speeches at the opening were given by Mayor Ruddenklau, Mayor-elect Charles Hulbert, and senior councillor Aaron Ayers. Hulbert was installed as Ruddenklau's successor on 19 December 1883.

The 1884 general election was contested by five candidates in the Stanmore electorate. The incumbent, Walter Pilliet, came a distant fourth place. Daniel Reese, Ruddenklau, Dorney, Pilliet and Wansey received 524, 435, 142, 43 and 19 votes, respectively. The majority for Reese was 89 votes. There was some protest about the election, but this came to nothing and the result stood as declared.

Although his English was 'imperfect', Ruddenklau's speeches were described as "thoroughly good, pithy, and to the purpose." He lacked "presence" at public occasions, but was a good and generous host. He was wealthy and did not have to run a business at the same time as fulfilling mayoral duties.

== Death and commemoration ==
Ruddenklau's only child, Fanny Gertrude, died in October 1863 shortly before she turned nine. Ruddenklau died at his home in Addington on 15 December 1891, aged 62. He was buried at Barbadoes Street Cemetery. His wife died on 29 June 1918. As their only child died during childhood, there are no direct descendants. All Ruddenklaus in New Zealand are descended from his brother John.

There is little that commemorates Ruddenklau today. Ruddenklau Lane in the Christchurch suburb of Bishopdale was created in a subdivision in the early 1980s and runs alongside the headwater of Dudley Creek. Ruddenklau's City Hotel was demolished in mid-1931, but the licence and the proprietor transferred to the New City Hotel further south on Colombo Street; this building is still standing and is a registered heritage structure. The German Church was confiscated in 1918 by the New Zealand Government and the church bells first ceremoniously smashed and then melted down in the aftermath of World War I when there were strong anti-German feelings in New Zealand. The church was demolished in 1933 and made way for a parish hall. The site of the Deutsche Kirche is today occupied by the Christchurch Art Gallery.
