= Mayor of Christchurch =

Head of the municipal government of Christchurch

- Coat of arms of Christchurch

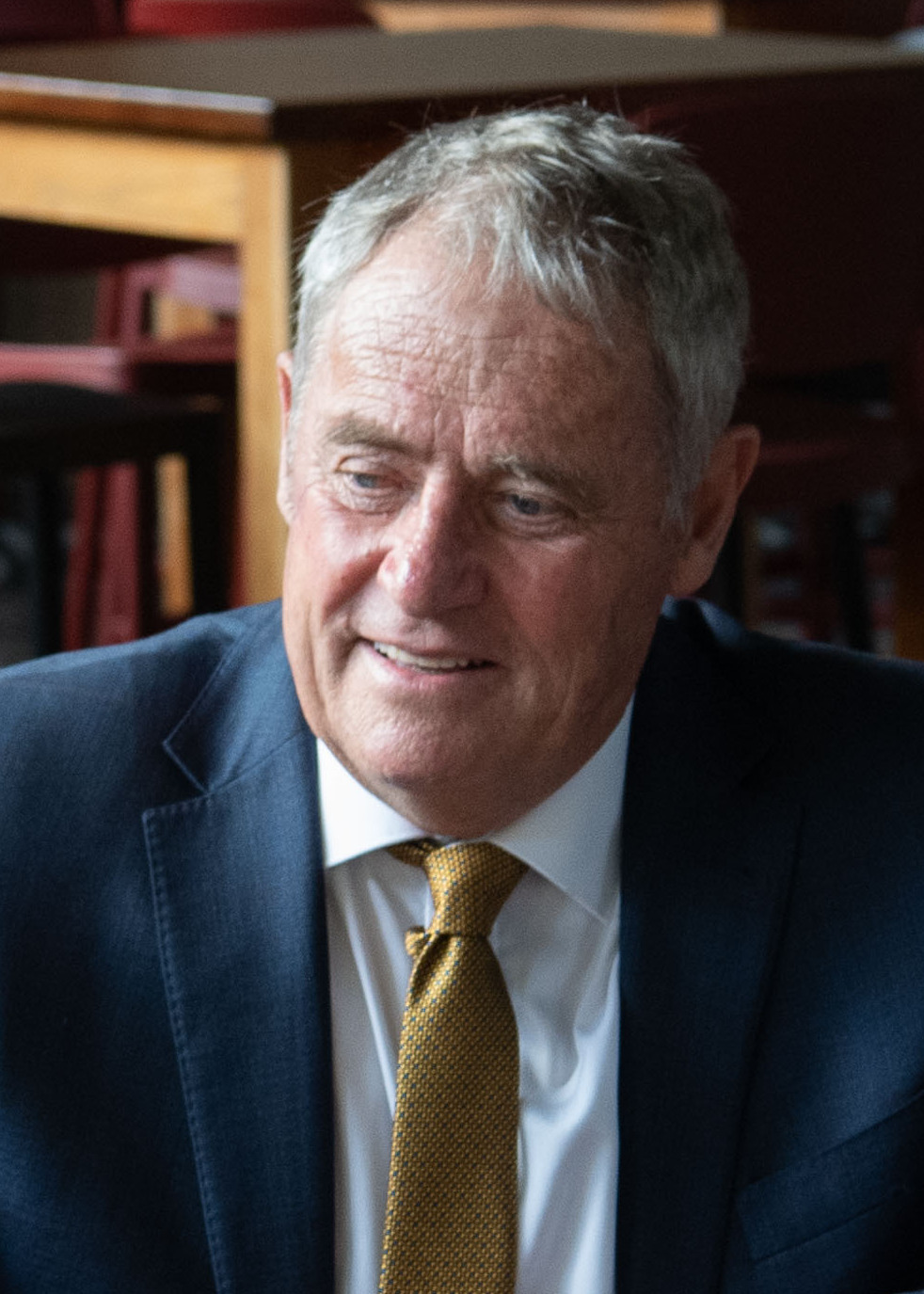
- Incumbent; Phil Mauger since 8 October 2022
- Christchurch City Council
- Style: His Worship
- Type: Council Leader
- Member of: Christchurch City Council
- Seat: Christchurch Civic Offices
- Appointer: Electorate of Christchurch
- Term length: Three years, renewable
- Inaugural holder: William Wilson
- Formation: 1868
- Deputy: Victoria Henstock
- Salary: $200,000
- Website: Official Website

The mayor of Christchurch is the elected head of local government in Christchurch, New Zealand; one of 67 mayors in the country. The mayor presides over the Christchurch City Council and is directly elected using the first-past-the-post method. The current mayor, Phil Mauger, was first elected in 2022. The current deputy mayor is Victoria Henstock.

Christchurch was initially governed by the chairman of the town council. In 1868, the chairman became the city council's first mayor as determined by his fellow city councillors. Since 1875, the mayor is elected by eligible voters and, after an uncontested election, the first election was held in the following year.

== History ==
=== Chairmen of the Town Council ===
Christchurch became a city by Royal charter on 31 July 1856; the first in New Zealand. Since 1862, chairmen were in charge of local government. Five chairmen presided in the initial years:

	Name	Portrait	Term
1	John Hall		1862–1863
2	John Ollivier		1863–1864
3	Isaac Luck		1865
4	Edward Bishop		1866
5	William Wilson		1867

=== Mayors of the City Council ===
The town council held a meeting on 10 June 1868 to elect its first mayor. In those days, councillors were elected for three-year terms, and once a year elected one of their group as mayor, i.e. the position was not elected at large (by the voting public) as is the case today.

The following councillors attended the 10 June meeting: William Wilson, James Purvis Jameson, T. Tombs, George Ruddenklau, Henry Thomson, W. A. Sheppard, William Calvert and John Anderson, who chaired the meeting. Thomson moved that Wilson be elected as the first mayor of Christchurch, and Tombs seconded the motion. The chairman put the motion to the meeting and it was carried unanimously. With the meeting, the council had brought itself under the Municipal Corporations Act 1867.

Hence, the last chairman (William Wilson) became the first mayor in 1868. The first chairman (John Hall) became mayor 44 years later in 1906. There have been 46 holders of the position. The longest-serving was Sir Hamish Hay, who held the post for 15 years (5 terms). The shortest mayoralty was by Tommy Taylor in 1911, who died three months after being elected. Wilson's term, at just over six months, was the second shortest. Vicki Buck and Lianne Dalziel, have been the only female mayors so far.

Initially, councillors elected one of their own as mayor towards the end of the year, and the role was usually awarded to the most senior councillor. Most elections were unanimous, and the newly elected mayor was instantly regarded as the head of the council. The system changed with the introduction of The Municipal Corporations Acts Amendment Act, 1875, as that legislation stipulated that mayors had to be elected at large (i.e. by eligible voters). Fred Hobbs, the incumbent, was the only candidate nominated, so he was declared elected unopposed on 17 December 1875. James Gapes was the first mayor elected at large on 20 December 1876. The newly elected person was from that point the mayor-elect, until he was sworn in; Gapes was sworn in on 2 January 1877. Despite this, Taylor's death in 1911 resulted in councillors electing their fellow councillor John Joseph Dougall as mayor as required by the legislation for such cases.

Mayors were initially appointed and then elected for one year; elections started following the Municipal Corporations Act of 1876. This was changed to biennial elections "on the last Wednesday in April" with the Municipal Corporations Amendment Act, 1913. The act came into force in March 1915 and thus first applied at the April 1915 mayoral election. The Municipal Corporations Act, 1933 changed the mayoral term to three years, and this commenced with the 1935 mayoral election.

Five mayors have held non-consecutive terms:

- James Gapes
- Walter Cooper
- Charles Louisson
- Charles Gray
- Robert Macfarlane

== Recent mayors ==
Four former mayors are alive:

- Vicki Buck (1989–1998)
- Garry Moore (1998–2007)
- Bob Parker (2007–2013)
- Lianne Dalziel (2013–2022)

== List of mayors ==
	Name	Portrait	Term
1	William Wilson		1868
2	John Anderson		1868–1869
3	Andrew Duncan		1869–1870
4	James Jameson		1870–1871
5	Henry Sawtell		1871–1872
6	Edward Bishop		1872–1873
7	Michael Hart		1873–1874
8	Fred Hobbs		1875–1876
9	James Gapes		1876–1877
10	Henry Thomson		1877–1878
11	Charles Thomas Ick		1878–1880
(9)	James Gapes		1880–1881
12	George Ruddenklau		1881–1883
13	Charles Hulbert		1883–1885
14	Aaron Ayers		1885–1887
15	Charles Louisson		1887–1889
16	Samuel Manning		1889–1890
17	Charles Gray		1890–1891
18	William Prudhoe		1891–1892
19	Eden George		1892–1893
20	Thomas Gapes		1893–1894
21	Walter Cooper		1894–1895
22	Harry Beswick		1895–1896
(21)	Walter Cooper		1896–1897
(15)	Charles Louisson		1897–1899
23	William Reece		1899–1901
24	Arthur Rhodes		1901–1902
25	Henry Wigram		1902–1904
(17)	Charles Gray		1904–1905
26	John Hall		1906–1907
27	George Payling		1907–1908
28	Charles Allison		1908–1911
29	Tommy Taylor		1911†
30	John Joseph Dougall		1911–1912
31	Henry Holland		1912–1919
32	Henry Thacker		1919–1923
33	James Flesher		1923–1925
34	Rev John Archer		1925–1931
35	Dan Sullivan		1931–1936
36	John Beanland		1936–1938
37	Robert Macfarlane		1938–1941
38	Ernest Andrews		1941–1950
(37)	Robert Macfarlane		1950–1958
39	George Manning		1958–1968
40	Ron Guthrey		1968–1971
41	Neville Pickering		1971–1974
42	Hamish Hay		1974–1989
43	Vicki Buck		1989–1998
44	Garry Moore		1998–2007
45	Bob Parker		2007–2013
46	Lianne Dalziel		2013–2022
47	Phil Mauger		2022–present

== List of deputy-mayors of Christchurch ==
The position of deputy mayor was established in 1917. In the first meeting of the newly elected council on 7 May 1917, Alfred Williams was the first city councillor to be elected to the position. Five deputy-mayors were later elected as mayors: John Beanland, James Flesher, Dan Sullivan, Ernest Andrews, and George Manning. Four deputy-mayors were mayors before they served as deputies: Henry Thacker, John Archer, Robert Macfarlane, and Vicki Buck. Since October 2025, the current deputy mayor is Victoria Henstock, who represents the Papanui ward.

Mayor		Term (mayor)	Deputy-mayor		Term (deputy)
31	Henry Holland	1912–1919	1	Alfred Williams	1917–1919
32	Henry Thacker	1919–1923	2	John Beanland	1919–1921
32	Henry Thacker	1919–1923	3	James Flesher	1921–1923
33	James Flesher	1923–1925	4	Arnaud McKellar	1923–1925
34	Rev John Archer	1925–1931	5	Charles Phipp Agar	1925–1927
34	Rev John Archer	1925–1931	6	Dan Sullivan	1927–1929
34	Rev John Archer	1925–1931	7	Henry Thacker	1929–1931
35	Dan Sullivan	1931–1936	8	Rev John Archer	1931–1935
35	Dan Sullivan	1931–1936		John Beanland, 2nd time	1935–1936
36	John Beanland	1936–1938	9	Ernest Andrews	1936–1938
37	Robert Macfarlane	1938–1941	10	John Septimus "Jack" Barnett	1938–1941
38	Ernest Andrews	1941–1950	11	Melville Lyons	1941–1947
38	Ernest Andrews	1941–1950	12	James (Jim) Neil Clarke	1947–1950
	Robert Macfarlane, 2nd time	1950–1958	13	George Manning	1950–1958
39	George Manning	1958–1968	14	Leslie George Amos	1958–1959
39	George Manning	1958–1968	15	Harold Smith	1959–1971
40	Ron Guthrey	1968–1971	15	Harold Smith	1959–1971
41	Neville Pickering	1971–1974	16	Robert Macfarlane	1971–1974
42	Hamish Hay	1974–1989	17	Peter Skellerup	1974–1980
42	Hamish Hay	1974–1989	18	Rex Lester	1980–1983
42	Hamish Hay	1974–1989	19	Maurice Carter	1983–1989
43	Vicki Buck	1989–1998	20	Morgan Fahey	1989–1998
44	Garry Moore	1998–2007	21	Lesley Keast	1998–2004
44	Garry Moore	1998–2007	22	Carole Evans	2005–2007
45	Bob Parker	2007–2013	23	Norm Withers	2008–2010
45	Bob Parker	2007–2013	24	Ngaire Button	2011–2013
46	Lianne Dalziel	2013–2022	25	Vicki Buck	2013–2016
46	Lianne Dalziel	2013–2022	26	Andrew Turner	2016–2022
47	Phil Mauger	2022–present	27	Pauline Cotter	2022–2025
47	Phil Mauger	2022–present	28	Victoria Henstock	2025–present
