= Dactylispa chujoi =

Scientific classification
- Kingdom: Animalia
- Phylum: Arthropoda
- Class: Insecta
- Order: Coleoptera
- Suborder: Polyphaga
- Infraorder: Cucujiformia
- Family: Chrysomelidae
- Genus: Dactylispa
- Species: D. chujoi

Binomial name
- Dactylispa chujoi Shirozu, 1957

Species of beetle

Dactylispa chujoi is a species of beetle of the family Chrysomelidae. It is found in Taiwan.

== Life history ==
The recorded host plants for this species are Rubus floribunda paniculata, Carpinus kawakamii, Prunus campanulata, Cyclobalanopsis glauca, Quercus variabilis and Rubus swinhoei.
