= Dactylispa xanthopus =

Scientific classification
- Kingdom: Animalia
- Phylum: Arthropoda
- Class: Insecta
- Order: Coleoptera
- Suborder: Polyphaga
- Infraorder: Cucujiformia
- Family: Chrysomelidae
- Genus: Dactylispa
- Species: D. xanthopus

Binomial name
- Dactylispa xanthopus (Gestro, 1898)

Synonyms
- Hispa xanthopus Gestro, 1898; Dactylispa vitalisi Gestro, 1920; Dactylispa corpulenta Uhmann, 1927

Species of beetle

Dactylispa xanthopus is a species of beetle of the family Chrysomelidae. It is found in Bangladesh, India (Arunachal Pradesh, Assam, Meghalaya, Darjeeling, Sikkim, Uttar Pradesh, West Bengal), Laos, Myanmar, Nepal, Taiwan, Thailand and Vietnam.

== Life history ==
The recorded host plants for this species are Rubus floribunda paniculata, Rubus innominatus and Rubus swinhoei.
