= 1895 Christchurch mayoral election =

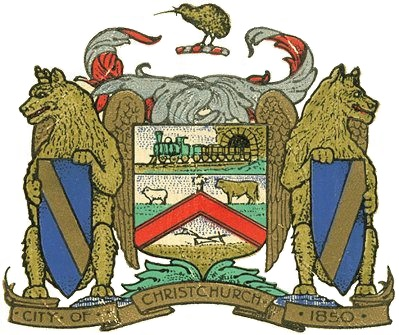
- 27 November 1895
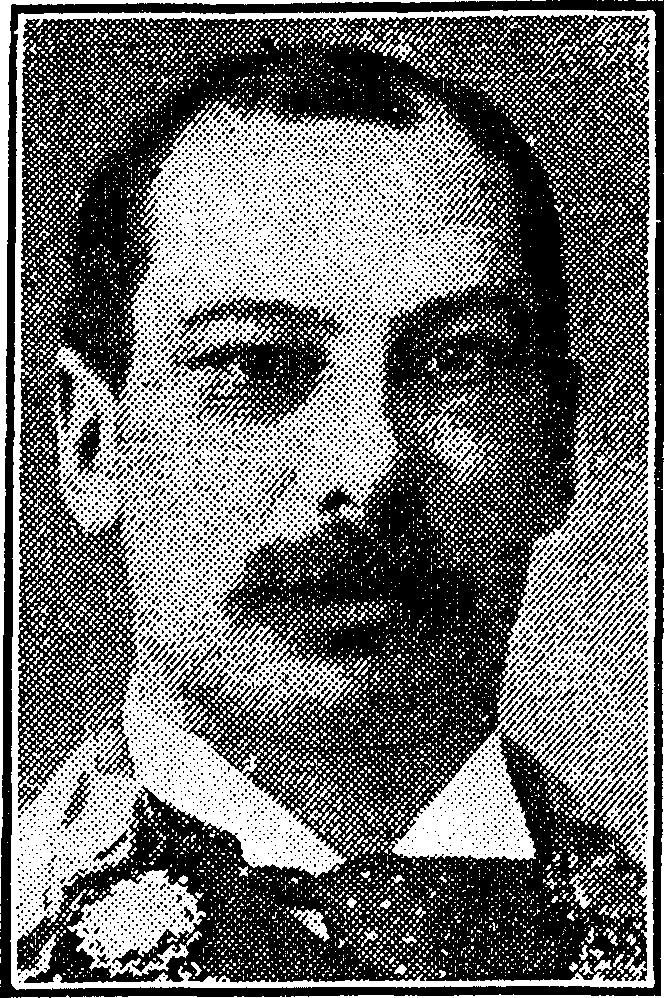
Candidate	Harry Beswick	Howell Widdowson
Party	Independent	Independent
Popular vote	844	566
Percentage	59.86	40.14
Mayor before election
Walter Cooper
Elected mayor
Harry Beswick

The Christchurch mayoral election held on 27 November 1895 was contested by city councillors Howell Widdowson and Harry Beswick. Both candidates were young solicitors with few prior civic roles. Initially, the incumbent mayor—Walter Cooper—was one of the candidates but he withdrew. Widdowson attracted some controversy over the question whether he put his nomination forward ahead of a more senior city councillor; many voters still expected at the time that a mayoralty should be assigned to the most senior councillor. Another important issue for many voters was that Widdowson was a tee-totaller and was thus regarded as a prohibitionist, with Beswick seen as the representative of the liquor lobby. Beswick won the election with a clear majority and was installed as mayor of Christchurch on 18 December 1895.

== Background and campaign ==
Walter Cooper, the incumbent mayor, had served one term; at the time a mayoral term was one year. Cooper had always maintained that mayors should only serve one term. A public meeting was called for 30 October 1895 to persuade Cooper to stand for another term. Cooper acceded to the request but would retire from any contest as soon as another candidate came forward who met "his standard" as he had laid down a year earlier. Cooper's remarks were met with surprise by some as councillor Widdowson had already declared his intention to stand for mayor; presumably Widdowson did not meet Cooper's standards.

Widdowson had received a requisition and agreed to stand for the mayoralty; both the requisition and his acceptance were published in newspapers on 19 October. Councillor George Bonnington, a chemist who represented the South-East Ward, was also asked to stand but he declined. On 29 October, a meeting was held by supporters of Widdowson. They organised themselves into committees for the election campaign. Thus, both Cooper and Widdowson were official candidates by early November, and Widdowson was formally nominated to the returning officer on 12 November. On 15 November, it was announced that Cooper had withdrawn from the contest.

Nominations for the mayoralty closed on 18 November. Beswick received a requisition that day, acceded to the request, and put his nomination forward. With an election required, the election day was set for 27 November and the city council offices were the only polling booth.

Beswick held a meeting for his supporters on 19 November where election committees were formed. Neither candidate called a public meeting.

At the time, it was still seen as customary by many for the mayoralty to be awarded to the most senior councillor. That person was councillor John Tippett Smith and when accusations came up that Widdowson had jumped the queue, Widdowson was adamant that he had only acceded to the requisition after Smith had decided to stand aside. Smith, however, stated that he had decided to stand after having received his own requisition. His supporters had asked him to see who else would stand before announcing his own candidacy. Nobody had asked him on behalf of Widdowson whether he intended to stand before Widdowson's nomination was announced. Smith then decided not to put his name forward as a three-person contest would have favoured Cooper and his main objective was for Cooper not to be re-elected.

== Candidates ==
Both candidates were young solicitors with little prior public service. Their early Christchurch careers had many parallels, with them attending the same school and being admitted to the bar within three days of one another.

=== Beswick ===
Harry Joseph Beswick (born 1860) was born in nearby Kaiapoi. His father was active in local political affairs and had been a member of parliament for the Kaiapoi electorate in the 1860s. Beswick received his schooling in Christchurch at Christ's College (1873–79) and was admitted to the bar on 14 September 1883. Beswick was a bachelor and known for his sporting successes.

=== Widdowson ===
Howell Young Widdowson (born 1859) was also educated at Christ's College (1873–77). He was admitted to the bar on 11 September 1883. Widdowson married in April 1885 at Trinity Congregational Church in Christchurch.

== Results ==
The election was held on Wednesday, 27 November 1885, from 9 am to 6 pm, with Henry Thomson acting as returning officer. To many people, it was an important issue that Widdowson was a tee-totaller as prohibition was heavily lobbied for, especially by women. At 7:05 pm, the returning officer released the results and declared Beswick elected. The turnout was the highest that had ever been recorded in Christchurch, with the previous high set the previous year, exceeded by either more than 100 or 200 votes (sources differ). It was noted that Beswick was the first bachelor ever elected as Christchurch mayor.

1895 Christchurch mayoral election
Party	Candidate	Votes	%	±%
Independent	Harry Beswick	844	59.86	
Independent	Howell Widdowson	566	40.14	
Majority		278	19.72	
Informal votes		6	0.42	
Turnout		1,416		
Registered electors		2,340		

Beswick was installed as mayor on 18 December 1895.

In October 1896, Mayor Beswick decided to stand for Parliament in the three-member City of Christchurch electorate. He was eventually backed by the National Conservative Association. Beswick did not stand for re-election as mayor, but a contest was held by former mayor Cooper and senior councillor John Tippett Smith.
