= Mac Stokes =

Australian rules footballer, born 1909

Personal information
- Full name: Malcolm John Stokes
- Born: 20 May 1909; Maffra West Upper, Victoria
- Died: 29 May 2003 (aged 94); Geelong, Victoria
- Original team: Barwon

Playing career^{1}
Years	Club	Games (Goals)
1929–31	Geelong	9 (2)
- ^{1} Playing statistics correct to the end of 1931.

Malcolm John "Mac" Stokes (20 May 1909 – 29 May 2003) was an Australian rules footballer who played with Geelong in the Victorian Football League (VFL).

== Family ==
The son of Archibald Stokes (1872–1945), and Agnes Stokes (1875–1957), née Gibbs, Malcolm John Stokes was born at Maffra West Upper, Victoria on 20 May 1909.

He married Thelma Grinter in 1932.

== Football ==
=== Barwon (GDFA) ===
He played for the Barwon Football Club in the Geelong and District Football Association (GDFA).

=== Geelong (VFL) ===
He was recruited by Geelong in 1929.

=== Barwon (GDFL) ===
In 1934 he was cleared from Geelong to the Barwon Football Club in the recently renamed Geelong and District Football League (GDFL).

== Military service ==
He served in the Australian Defence Forces during the Second World War.
