= Diminish and Ascend =

Optical illusion sculpture

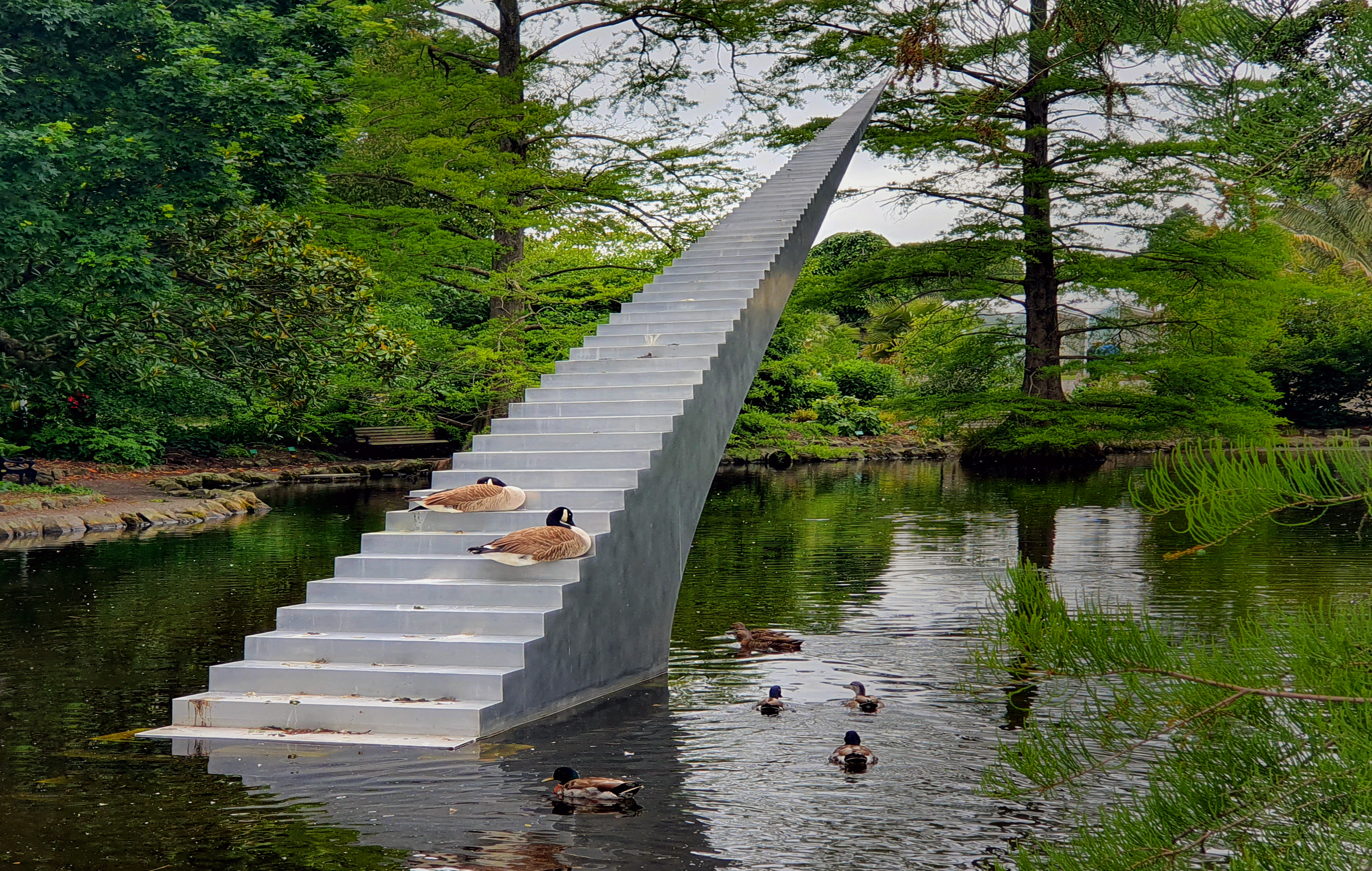
- Artist: David McCracken
- Completion date: 2013
- Medium: Aluminum
- Subject: Stairway
- Dimensions: 12 metres (39 ft) x 1.45 metres (4.8 ft) x 3.8 metres (12 ft)
- Location: Christchurch
- Owner: Christchurch City Council
- Website: Artist website

Diminish and Ascend is a welded aluminum stairway sculpture by David McCracken. It is permanently installed in the Christchurch Botanic Gardens in New Zealand. The sculpture is an optical illusion.

== History ==
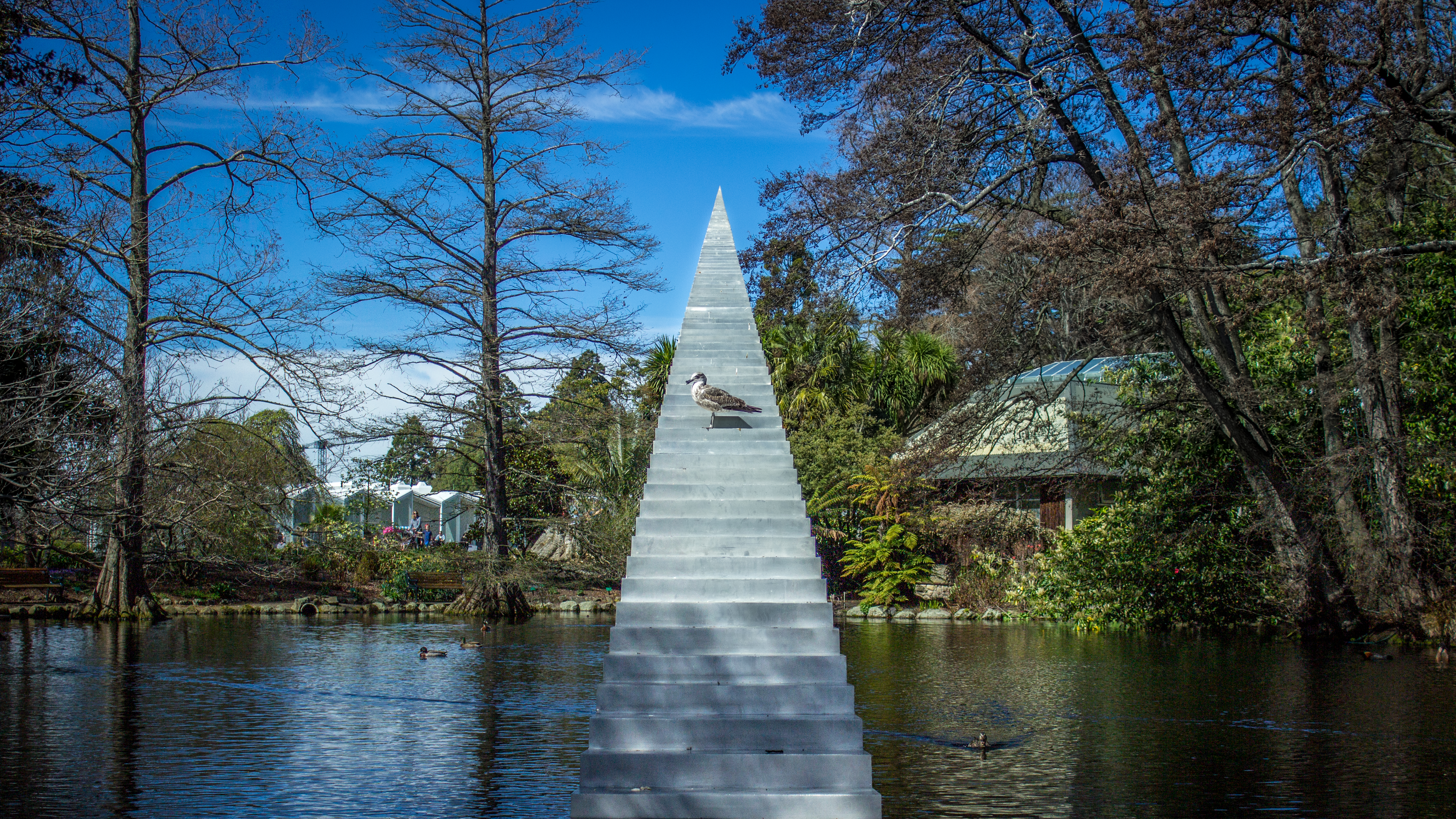
Diminish and Ascend

In 2013, the sculpture was first displayed in Bondi Beach, Australia, at the Sculpture by the Sea event. It was then moved to Waiheke Island in New Zealand. In 2016 it was moved to the Christchurch Botanic Gardens in New Zealand. The cost of the sculpture was NZ$192,000. The cost of the sculpture was funded with a grant from the Friends of the Botanic Gardens, and sponsorship from Christchurch City Council Art in Public Spaces Fund.

The NZ$700 per month cost of maintenance for the sculpture (mainly to remove bird droppings) is covered by the Christchurch City Council.

== Design ==
New Zealand artist David McCracken designed the sculpture to be constructed from welded aluminum. The dimensions of the structure are 12 metres (39 ft) x 1.45 metres (4.8 ft) x 3.8 metres (12 ft). It is installed in Christchurch Botanic Gardens in Kiosk Lake. It is a stairway sculpture which is meant to be an optical illusion. The illusion is achieved due to wider steps at the bottom of the sculpture which gradually decrease in size with each step until they come to a vanishing point at the top. The steps at the top are just a few centimeters wide. When viewed from certain angles it appears to be an endless stairway.

== Reception ==
Bored Panda put the sculpture at number 12 on their list of "42 of the Most Amazing Sculptures in the World". The Huffington Post called it an "M. C. Escher drawing in real life". Christchurch City Council member Phil Clearwater has said the sculpture is a "peaceful, reflective artwork". Pinar Noota from My Modern Met has referred to it as a "stairway to heaven". In 2019 Architectural Digest included it their 38 most fascinating sculptures.

The sculpture killed two birds after being installed at the Christchurch Botanical Gardens. The animals flew into the end of the sculpture, impaling themselves. Councillor Tim Scandrett called the artwork "a poisoned chalice", citing the expense of maintenance. Community principal advisor, Brent Smith, stated that the cost of maintenance of the sculpture took funds away from other projects.
