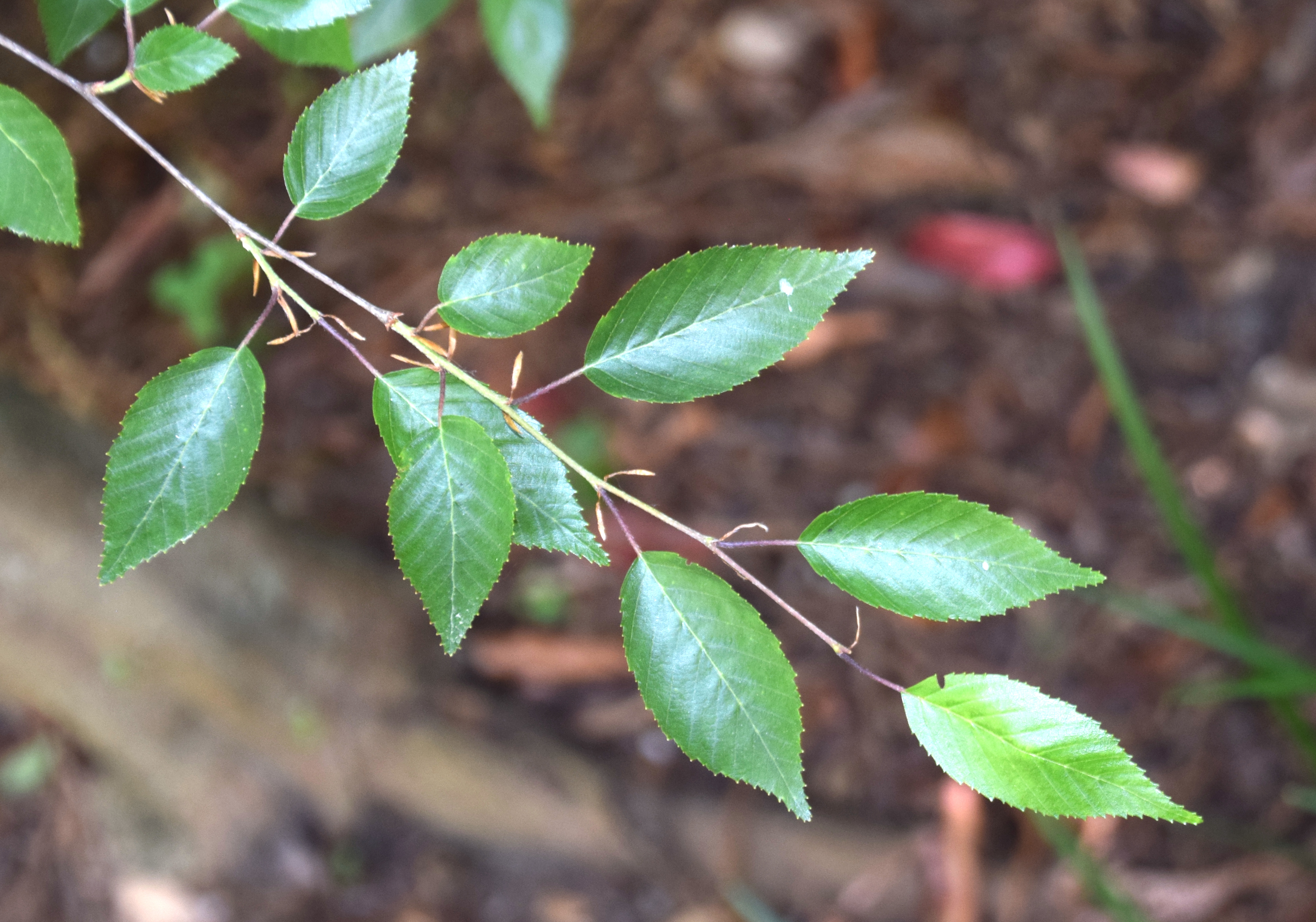
- In Christchurch Botanic Gardens
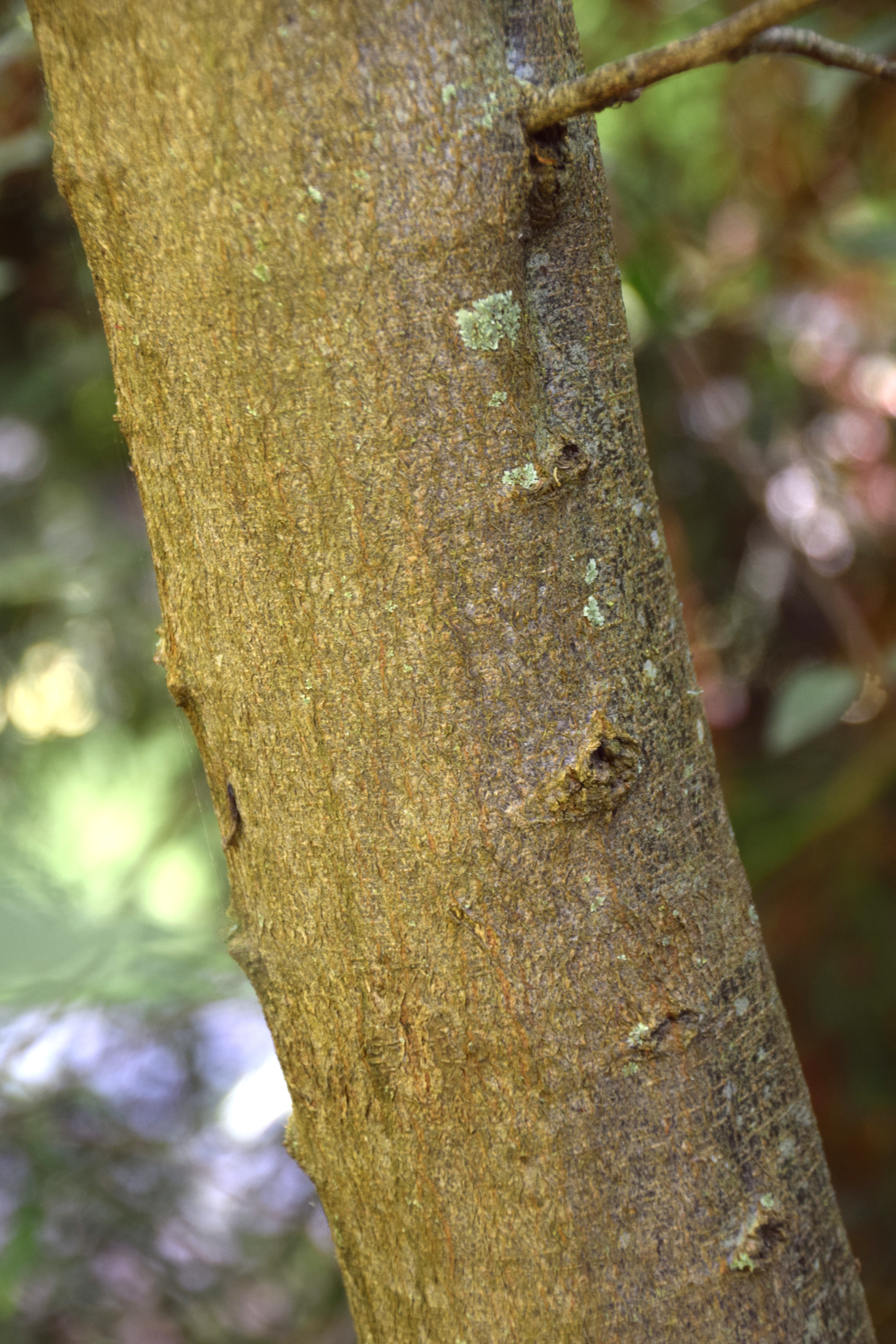
- Trunk

Conservation status
- Least Concern (IUCN 3.1)

Scientific classification
- Kingdom: Plantae
- Clade: Embryophytes
- Clade: Tracheophytes
- Clade: Angiosperms
- Clade: Eudicots
- Clade: Rosids
- Order: Fagales
- Family: Betulaceae
- Genus: Carpinus
- Species: C. kawakamii

Binomial name
- Carpinus kawakamii Hayata

Synonyms
- Carpinus hogoensis Hayata; Carpinus minutiserrata Hayata; Carpinus sekii Yamam.

= Carpinus kawakamii =

Species of plant

Carpinus kawakamii is a species of flowering plant in the hornbeam genus Carpinus (family Betulaceae). It is native to southeastern China, and Taiwan. A tree reaching 9 m (30 ft), it prefers to grow in sunny openings within forests at elevations from 500 to 2,000 m (1,600 to 6,600 ft). It is available from specialist nurseries.

== Subtaxa ==
The following varieties are accepted:

- Carpinus kawakamii var. kawakamii – southeastern China, Taiwan
- Carpinus kawakamii var. minutiserrata (Hayata) S.S.Ying – Taiwan
