= Walter Cooper (mayor) =

New Zealand Mayor of christ-church

Walter Cooper JP
- Cooper in 1910

21st Mayor of Christchurch
- In office 19 December 1894 – 18 December 1895
- Preceded by: Thomas Gapes
- Succeeded by: Harry Beswick
- In office 17 December 1896 – 15 December 1897
- Preceded by: Harry Beswick
- Succeeded by: Charles Louisson

Personal details
- Born: Walter Henry Cooper; 1845 Somerset, England
- Died: 17 April 1941 (aged 96) Upper Maffra, Victoria, Australia

Walter Henry Cooper JP (c. 1845 – 17 April 1941) was Mayor of Christchurch in 1895, and again in 1897. Born in Somerset, he came to New Zealand early in his life via Australia. A butcher by trade, he later worked in trade and export. He was for many years a member of Christchurch City Council. After his wife died, he lived with his daughter in Victoria, Australia.

== Early life ==
Cooper was born in Somerset in circa 1845. He emigrated to Australia in 1852 and shortly after that went to New Zealand.

== Professional life ==
In Christchurch, he joined the firm of Messrs Hopkins and Co., butchers, as their manager. Three years later, he left Hopkins and Co, and bought the business from an estate. He worked in wholesale and export trade until he retired in 1893.

== Political career ==
Cooper first stood for Christchurch City Council in September 1888, when he defeated Henry Thomson in the North-East Ward.

A mayoral election was held on 28 November 1894. The incumbent, Thomas Gapes, stood again and was challenged by two sitting councillors, Cooper and Edward Smith. Cooper, Gapes, and Smith received 587, 364, and 246 votes, respectively. Cooper was thus declared elected, and was installed as mayor on 19 December 1894. His election as mayor left a vacancy, which was filled by William Epthorp Samuels.

At the end of his term as mayor, Cooper did not stand for re-election. The mayoralty was contested by two city councillors, Harry Beswick and Howell Widdowson. Beswick was successful, and he was installed on 18 December 1895.

In November 1896, nominations were called for the next mayoral election. For a while, councillor John Tippett Smith was the only candidate. A large and influential deputation requested Cooper to stand again, to which he acceded. On 25 November 1896, Cooper won the election, and he was installed on 17 December. Cooper's return caused a by-election in the North-East Ward, and Dr Adam Mickle was returned unopposed. Cooper did not stand again at the end of his second term, but Charles Louisson, a former mayor, was asked to stand again for mayor in September 1897. Louisson was elected unopposed on 16 November and installed on 15 December.

Cooper was a member of various organisations. He was chairman of the Conciliation Board, the St. John Ambulance Association, and the Society for the Prevention of Cruelty to Animals. He was a member of the Charitable Aid Board and Domain Board.

== Death ==
His wife Catherine died on 7 November 1922. Cooper moved to his daughter, Elsie Lee Rawlings, in Upper Maffra, Victoria, Australia, and he died at his daughter's residence on 17 April 1941, aged 96. He was cremated at Springvale.
