= Harry Beswick (politician) =

New Zealand mayor (1860–1934)

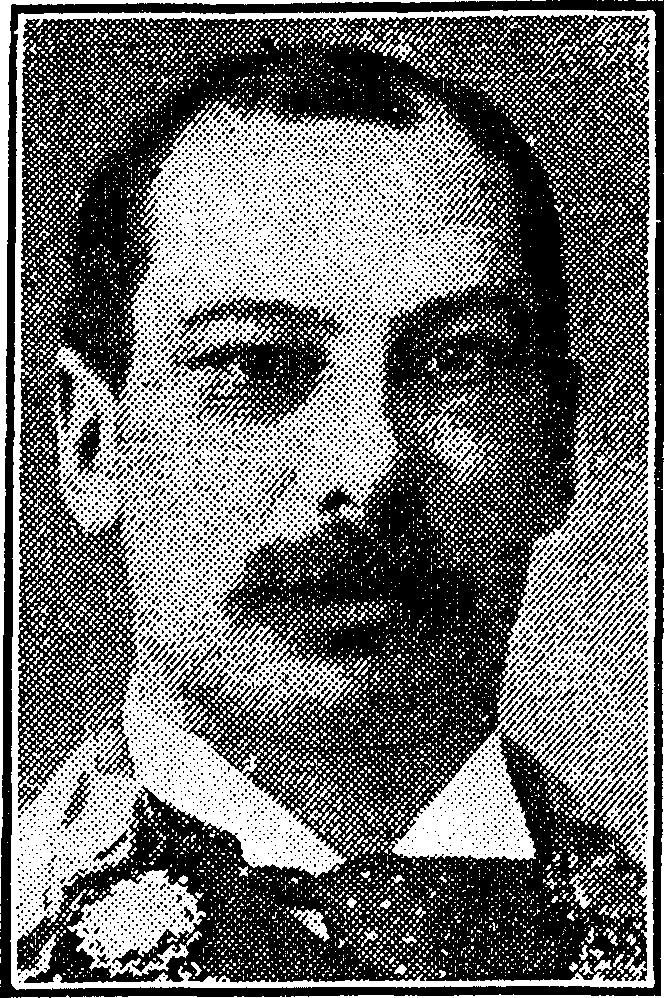
- Beswick during his mayoralty

22nd Mayor of Christchurch
- In office 18 December 1895 – 17 December 1896
- Preceded by: Walter Cooper
- Succeeded by: Walter Cooper

Personal details
- Born: 2 May 1860 Kaiapoi
- Died: 11 April 1934 (aged 73) London, England
- Parent: Joseph Beswick (father)
- Relatives: James Mills (father-in-law)

Harry Joseph Beswick (2 May 1860 – 11 April 1934) was Mayor of Christchurch in 1896.

== Early life ==
Beswick was born in Kaiapoi in 1860, the son of Joseph Beswick. In the mid-1860s, his father was a member of parliament for the Kaiapoi electorate. Beswick Jr received his education at Christ's College in Christchurch. Beswick played rugby union for Christchurch Football Club and also played for the Canterbury representative team.

On 25 October 1899, Beswick married Florence Ethel Mills (known as Florence) at St. Matthew's Church in Dunedin. She was the second daughter of James Mills, the founder of the Union Steam Ship Company in Dunedin.

== Professional life ==
After school, he trained at Harper and Harper, solicitors in Christchurch. Later, he worked for Thomas Duncan and Henry Cotterill; the law firm still exists under the name Duncan Cotterill.

== Political career ==
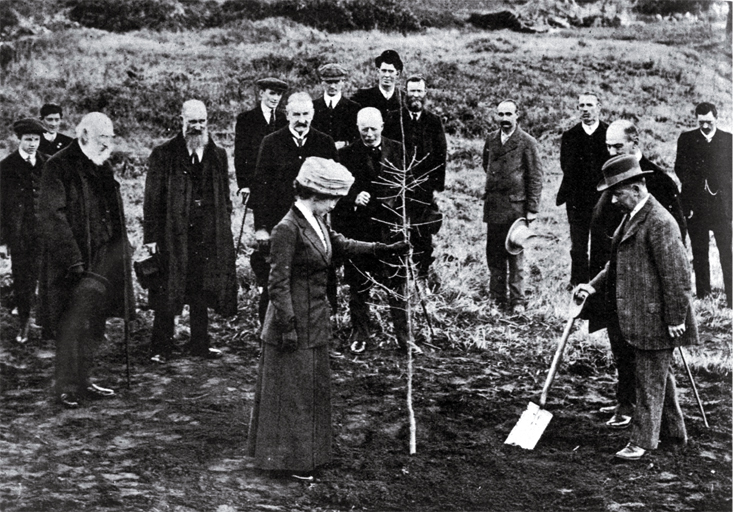
Florence Beswick planting a Coronation oak in the Christchurch Domain in 1911

John Anderson resigned from Christchurch City Council in mid-April 1894 to visit England. Anderson was succeeded in the North-West ward by Beswick who was unopposed for the position. Beswick's term expired in September 1895 and he was again returned unopposed for the North-West Ward. Beswick would by the end of 1895 be elected mayor. He was installed as mayor on 18 December 1895. In his speech after his installation, Beswick claimed that he was the youngest Christchurch mayor yet (he was 35 years and 7 months old) but that was not correct. Andrew Duncan, the third mayor, had also been 35 years old when he got installed (although only Duncan's year of birth is known) but Fred Hobbs, the eighth mayor, got installed the day before his 33rd birthday.

In October 1896, Mayor Beswick decided to stand for Parliament in the City of Christchurch electorate. He was eventually backed by the National Conservative Association. He was one of eleven candidates in the three-member electorate in the 1896 election and came sixth. Beswick did not stand for re-election as mayor, but a contest was held by former mayor Cooper and senior councillor John Tippett Smith.

Beswick was again elected as a Christchurch city councillor in 1903 at the first elections for Greater Christchurch (when many suburbs got amalgamated). He served until 1905.

Beswick was for many years chairman of the Christchurch Domain, now known as the Christchurch Botanic Gardens. An avenue of lime trees planted in 1917 in the domain is named Beswick's Walk in his honour.

== Death ==
Beswick died in London on 11 April 1934.
