= Christchurch Botanic Gardens =

Botanical gardens in New Zealand

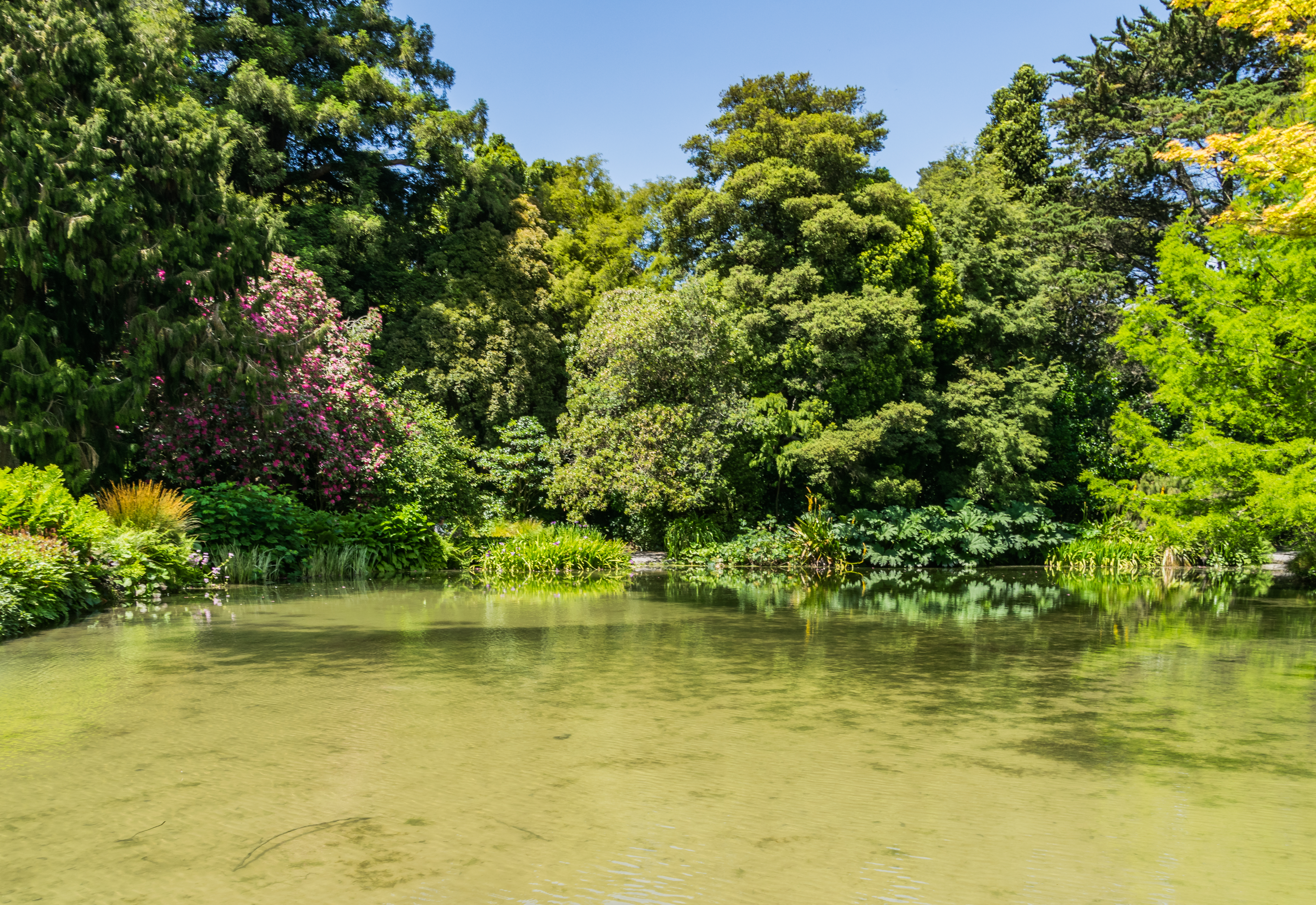
- Christchurch Botanic Gardens
- Interactive map of Christchurch Botanic Gardens
- Type: Botanical
- Location: Hagley Park, Christchurch, New Zealand
- Coordinates: 43.53°S 172.62°E
- Area: 21 hectares (52 acres)
- Opened: 1863
- Operator: Christchurch City Council
- Visitors: 550,000
- Open: All year
- Species: 50,000
- Website: ccc.govt.nz/parks-and-gardens/christchurch-botanic-gardens

The Christchurch Botanic Gardens, located in the central city of Christchurch, New Zealand, were founded in 1863 when an English oak was planted to commemorate the solemnisation of the marriage of Prince Albert and Princess Alexandra of Denmark. The gardens sprawl over an area of 21 hectares and lie adjacent to the loop of the Avon River next to Hagley Park. The Christchurch Botanic Gardens have a variety of collections of exotic and local plants of New Zealand, several conservatories, a nursery, playground and Climatological Station.

== History ==
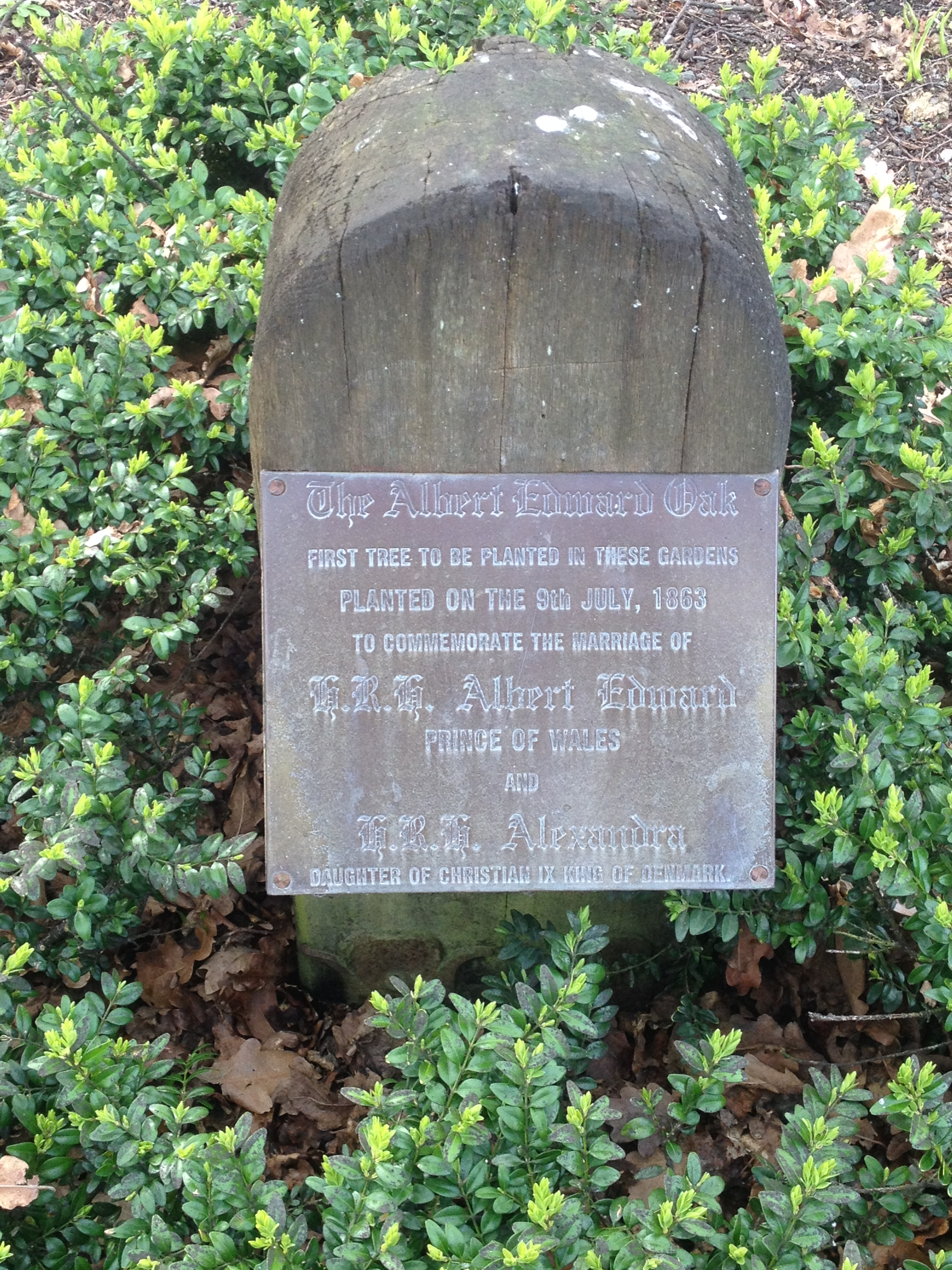
A commemorative plaque of the Albert Edward Oak

- 1863 English oak planted for Prince Albert and Princess Alexandra of Denmark's marriage.
- 1882 International Industrial Exhibition held in South Hagley Park. Acclimatisation Gardens formally opened to the public.
- 1901 Magnetic Observatory complex constructed in the domain. It is used by explorers Robert Scott and Ernest Shackleton to calibrate their compasses before heading to Antarctica.
- 1910 First domain fête held, attracting a crowd of between 20,000 and 25,000 visitors. First stage of James Young's rose garden laid out.
- 1911 Peacock Fountain originally erected near where the McDougall Art Gallery now stands.
- 1914 Townend House conservatory opened.
- 1923 Winter Garden conservatory (later Cuningham House) opened.
- 1926 Bandsmen's Memorial Rotunda officially opened

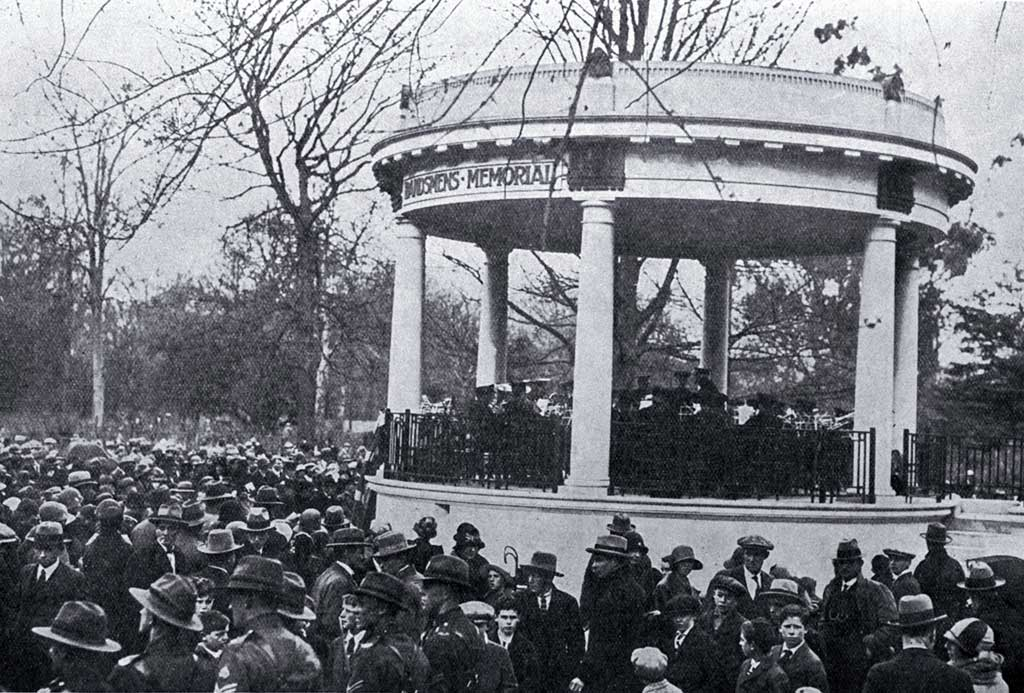
Opening of the Bandsmen Rotunda

- 1932 Robert McDougall Art Gallery opened
- 1938 Cockayne Memorial Garden opened.
- 1955 Fern House opened.
- 1960 Garrick House conservatory opened.
- 1967 Foweraker House conservatory opened.
- 1990 Kate Sheppard Memorial Walk created.
- 1996 Peacock Fountain restored after going into storage in 1949.
- 2006 Peace Bell unveiled in the gardens, on 3 October.
- 2009 Dr. John Clemens appointed curator.
- 2014 Christchurch Botanic Gardens won the 2014 Supreme Design Excellence Award at the Ellerslie International Flower Show with a horticultural exhibit called Burn after Reeding.

== Mission ==
The mission of Christchurch Botanic Gardens is threefold:

- lead in the areas of horticulture, display, interpretation, education, research, networking, cultural and heritage relevance and community appreciation.
- emphasis is placed on New Zealand indigenous (native) plant diversity and global plant diversity.
- to protect heritage and cultural values.

== Visitor Centre ==
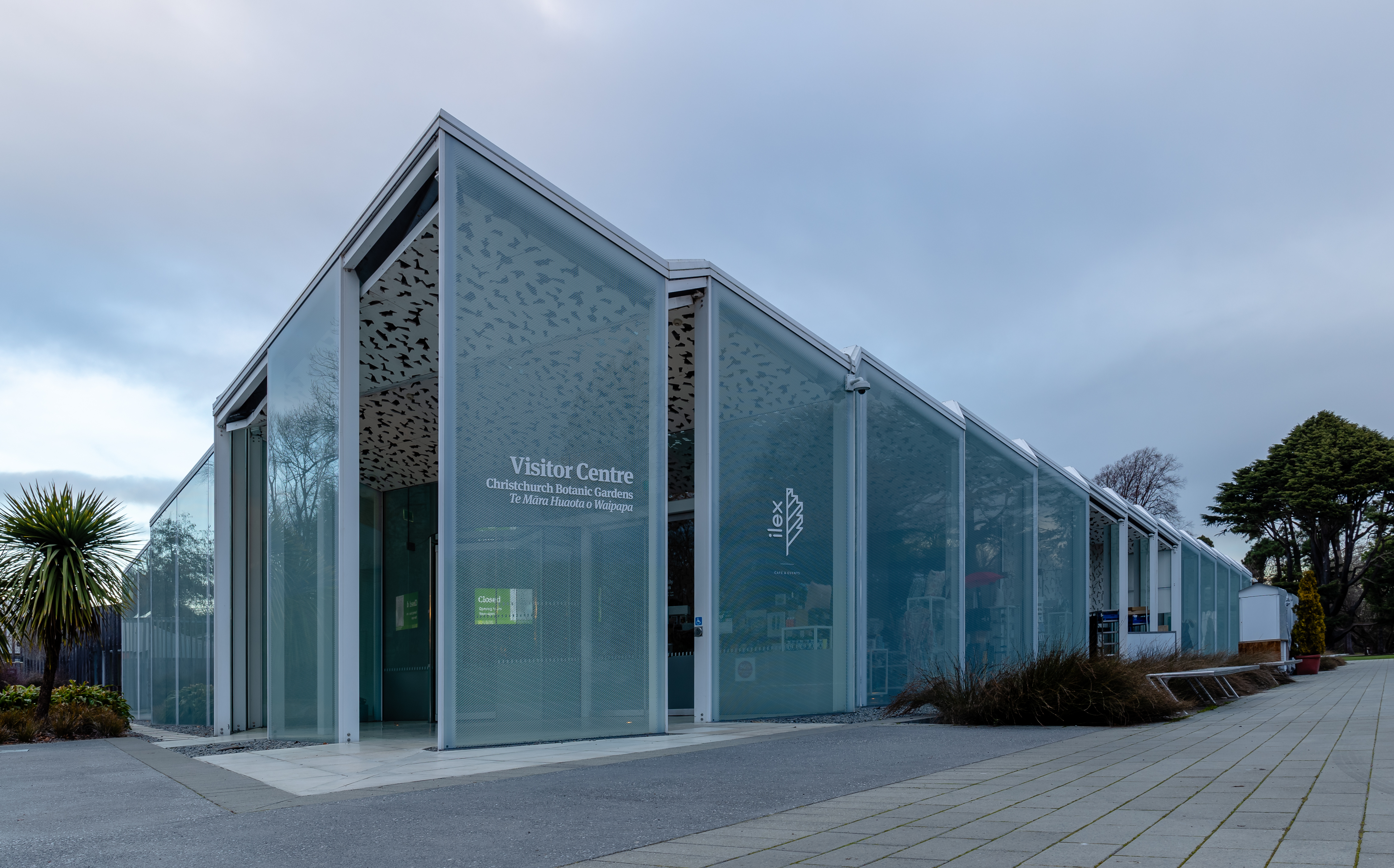
Botanic Garden Visitor Centre

The Botanic Gardens Visitor Centre, which opened in April 2014, has a café, gift shop and an interactive permanent exhibition featuring the history of plants and gardening in Canterbury. Attached to the visitor centre is the Ilex nursery, where 10,000 plant species are propagated in order to supply the conservatories and also preserve species.

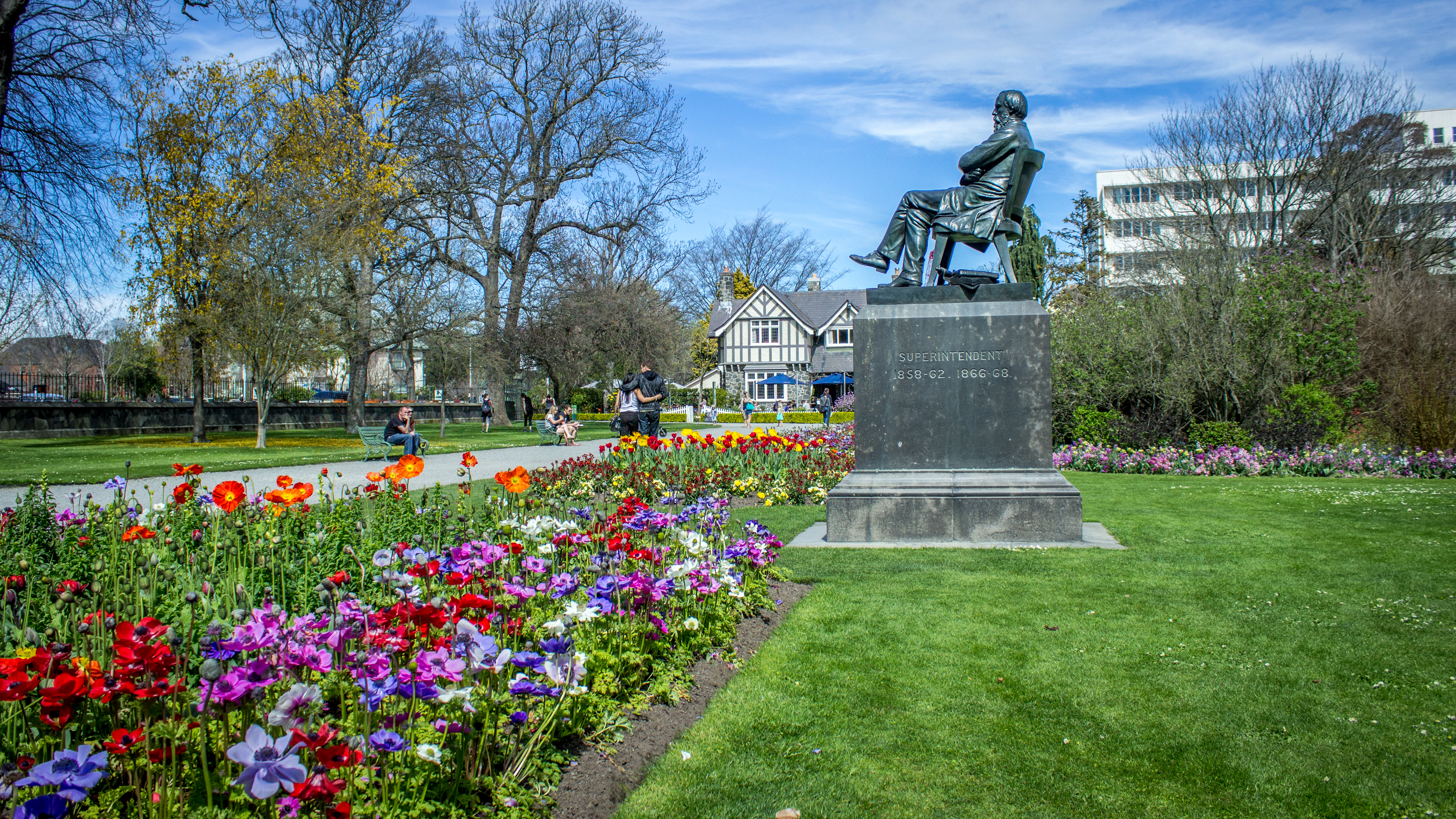
Armstrong Lawn

== Armstrong lawn ==
John Armstrong, one of the early curators of the gardens, is commemorated at the Armstrong Lawn, where formal bedding displays of petunia, begonia and salvia bloom through spring and summer with tulips, primula and Iceland poppies bringing post-winter colour. The Peacock Fountain was imported from England and first installed in the garden. A statue of William Sefton Moorhouse commemorates the second of the four superintendents of the Canterbury provincial government. At the far end of the lawn is the Curator's House, built in 1920, which is now used for fine dining and education. In its garden, nasturtiums and herbs grow alongside heirloom and gourmet vegetables.

== Collections ==
=== New Zealand Gardens ===
The New Zealand Garden was established at its present location between 1910 and 1927 by Botanic Gardens Curator James Young. Over several decades these gardens evolved into a extensive collection of New Zealand species. The gardens provide opportunities to walk underneath a canopy of mature trees such as kahikatea and beech. The New Zealand Icon Garden contains a short, looped trail featuring some of New Zealand's native plants. The small grove allows visitors to view native New Zealand and see mature trees and plants including the silver fern, harakeke, rimu and kōtukutuku.

=== Herbaceous Border ===
Laid in 1926, the gardens’ border is in two parts, divided by an ornamental sundial presented by Canterbury Superintendent William Rolleston in 1873. The sandy soils at the eastern end are perfect for plants from hot dry climates and is shaded from wind by the Robert McDougall Art Gallery. Colourful European and North American plants including phlox, aster and geranium dominate the moist western end. In the shadiest areas, hostas are a feature.

=== Central Rose Garden ===
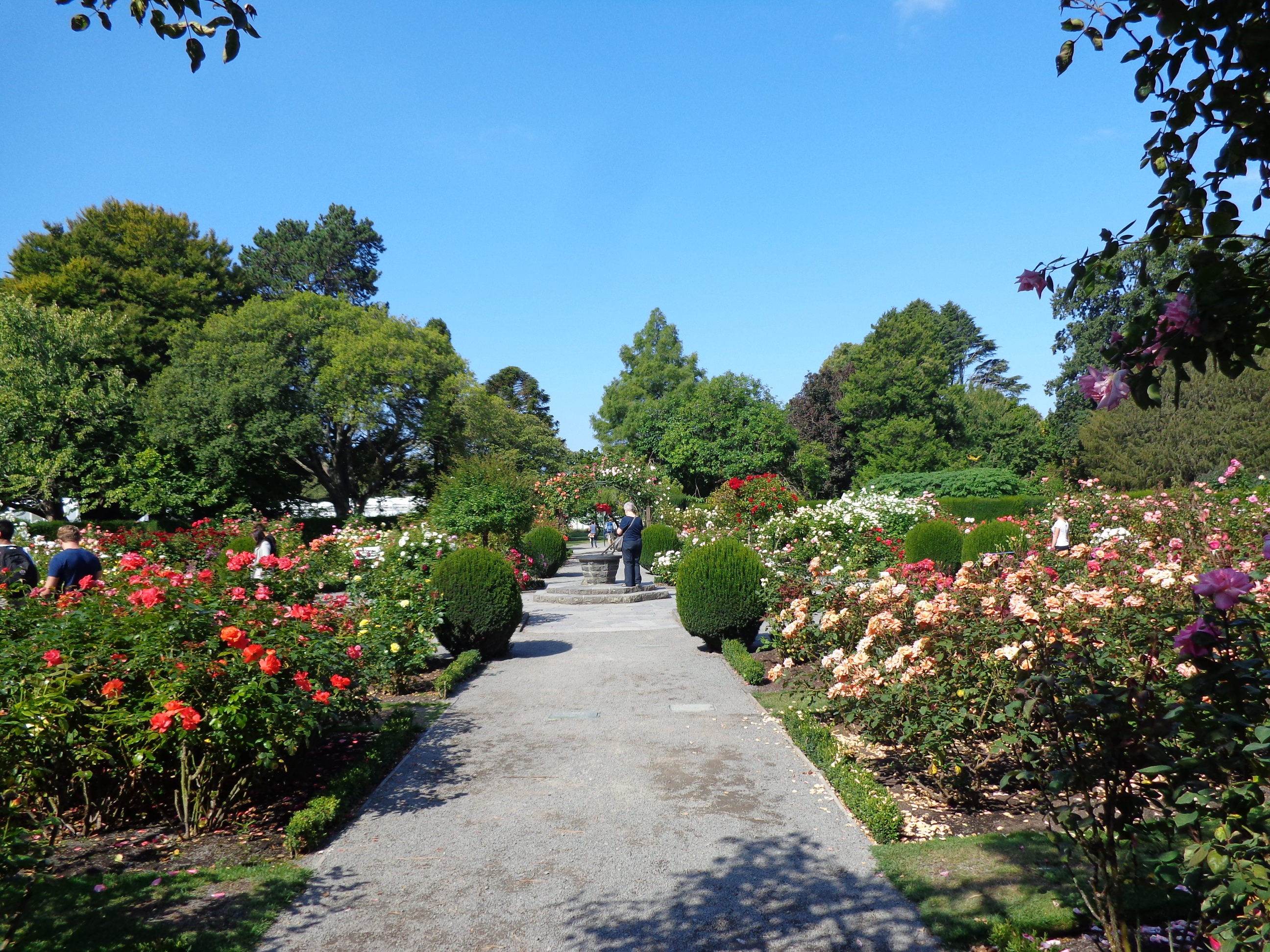
Central Rose Garden

When the first rose garden was established here in 1909, it was considered the largest and finest in Australasia, with its rectangular rosarium having 132 beds and almost 2500 rose bushes. The rose garden was redeveloped in the mid-1930s, with four paths converging at a mirror pool in the middle of a circular design. Twenty years later a memorial sundial replaced the pool. Now, 104 beds support a profusion of climbing, standard and Hybrid Tea modern garden roses.

=== Rock garden ===
The Rock Garden contains some plants that remain in flower throughout the year. The Rock Garden's terraced south-facing slopes are ideal for growing many alpine plants and most of the plants here are exotic (the native subalpine species are part of the New Zealand collection). On the other side of the path, the Heather Garden faces the sunny north with many species of heath and heather growing here. In 1917, when the original rock garden was developed, gardeners planted an avenue of limes. The path was named Beswick's Walk after a former mayor of Christchurch, Harry Beswick.

=== Cockayne Memorial Garden ===
In 1938, the New Zealand Garden was extended to allow space for alpine plants, Hebe and Leptospermum beds. The new addition was created as a memorial to Dr Leonard Cockayne (1855–1934) in honour of his comprehensive contribution to New Zealand's botany, horticulture, ecology and conservation. In the 1960s this garden was completely redesigned and replanted, such as kōwhai, horoeka, and tōtara.

=== Azalea and Magnolia Garden ===
Under canopies of mature oaks and silver birch trees, the azalea flower for about a month from mid-October. Deciduous rhododendron mollis are the main species present with their spring show being enhanced by the sculptured flowers of the magnolias, in bloom slightly earlier, and the cone-shaped flowers of the horse chestnut trees.

=== Heritage Rose garden ===
This collection began in 1952 and was remodelled in 1999. The garden includes rose species, hybrids and varieties commonly cultivated in the 18th, 19th and early 20th centuries. In 1979, the World Federation of Rose Societies adopted a simple classification for roses and Heritage roses are defined as those established before 1867.

=== Temperate Asian Collection ===
Contains a temperate Asian collection of trees and shrubs, most of them from China, Japan and the Himalayas.

=== Water garden ===
Gravel and sand were removed from this area by the cartload in the early 1900s and used to construct paths around the growing city. The pits left behind were developed into a cluster of ponds. The ponds’ silty mud floors are perfect for growing water lilies (Nymphaea) and are seldom cleaned or disturbed. Many of the water garden plants are herbaceous perennials that lie down in winter, such as the bright blue Siberian iris and the marsh marigold. West of the main pond is also a Yucca collection.

== Woodlands ==
=== Daffodil woodland ===
Early colonists set aside grounds in Hagley Park to test how plants and animals from around the world would adapt to New Zealand conditions. The Canterbury Acclimatisation Society developed the area, introducing European fish and birdlife as well as a small zoo which also housed several species, including a California grizzly bear. In 1928, the Acclimatisation Society relocated, and the land became part of Hagley Park again, with daffodils being planted from 1933.

=== Woodland Garden ===
In spring, primulas create a mass of early colour alongside a small stream, Addington Brook, which flows through South Hagley Park to the Avon River.

=== Pinetum ===
The pinetum is an arboretum of pine trees or related conifers and the planting in the gardens’ pinetum started before World War II. The collection has matured into a fine expanse of conifers, including many species and cultivars of cedar, cypress, fir, larch, juniper and spruce.

== Ornamental buildings ==
- Peace Bell

The Christchurch Botanic Gardens was chosen as the location for the New Zealand Peace Bell. Once the site was blessed by Ngāi Tahu, a raised pavilion was constructed in 2005 and unveiled in 2006. The massive 365 kg bell is inscribed with the English 'World Peace Bell' and Japanese 'sekai heiwa no kane'.

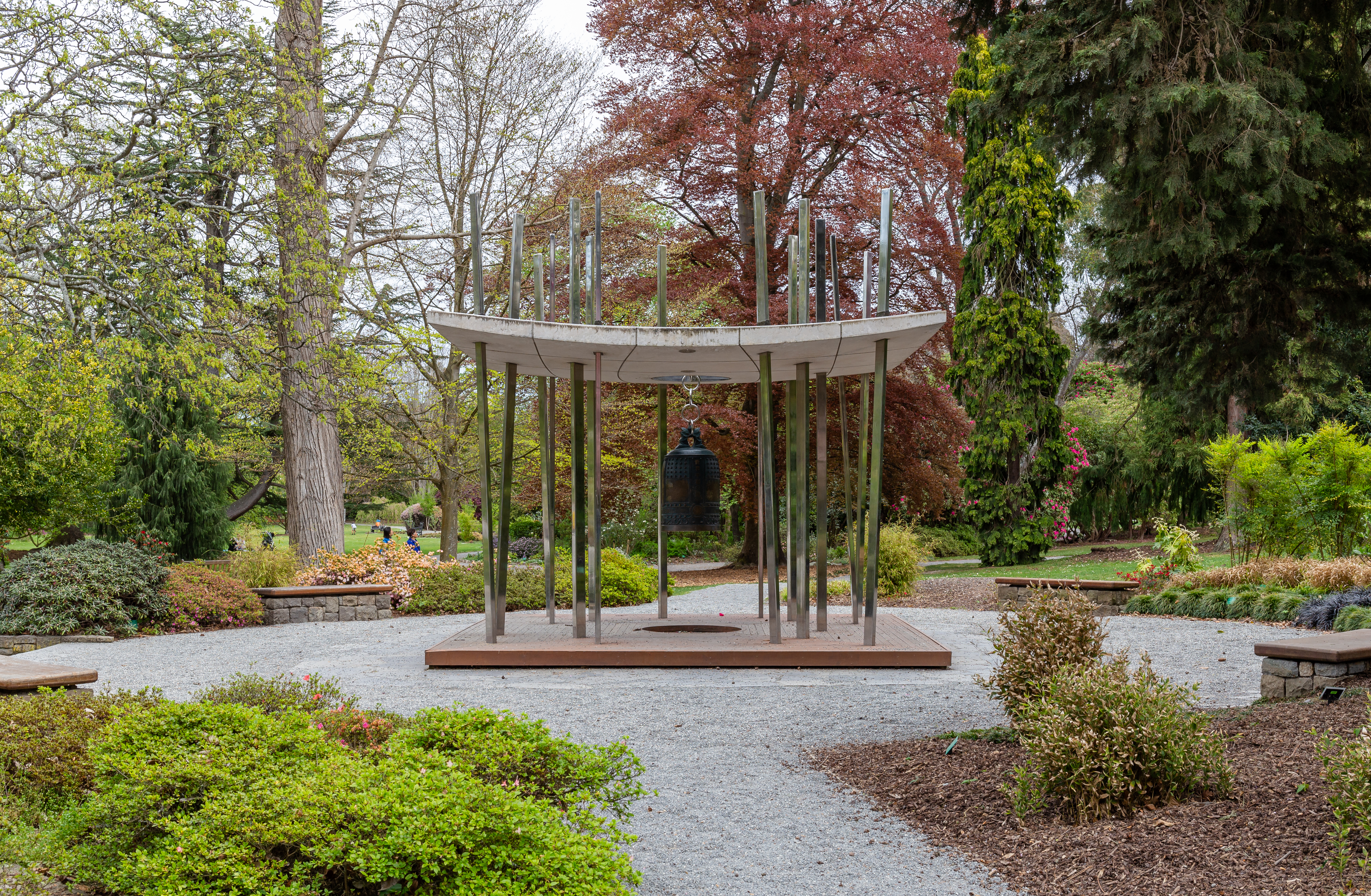
World Peace Bell

At the unveiling in 2006, Ngāi Tahu gifted Ira Atua Tane, a sculpted piece of pounamu (greenstone), which was placed in the reflection pond beneath the Bell. In the same year, part of this pounamu – Ira Atua Wahine – was placed under the Te Korowai Rangimarie – Cloak of Peace sculpture (by Kingsley Baird) gifted to the Nagasaki Peace Park by the New Zealand government and six city councils.

- Band Rotunda

The Bandsmen's Memorial Rotunda was erected in 1926 and was officially opened by MP Sir Heaton Rhodes. Rhodes, a Colonel in the war, recounted that after Gallipoli only one band could be formed from the four that went to the battle as casualties were so heavy. Until the 1950s, brass bands would regularly play at the Bandsmen's Memorial Rotunda and many Christchurch residents would gather for concerts on a Sunday afternoon. The rotunda is a Heritage New Zealand Category 2 historic place.

== Conservatories ==
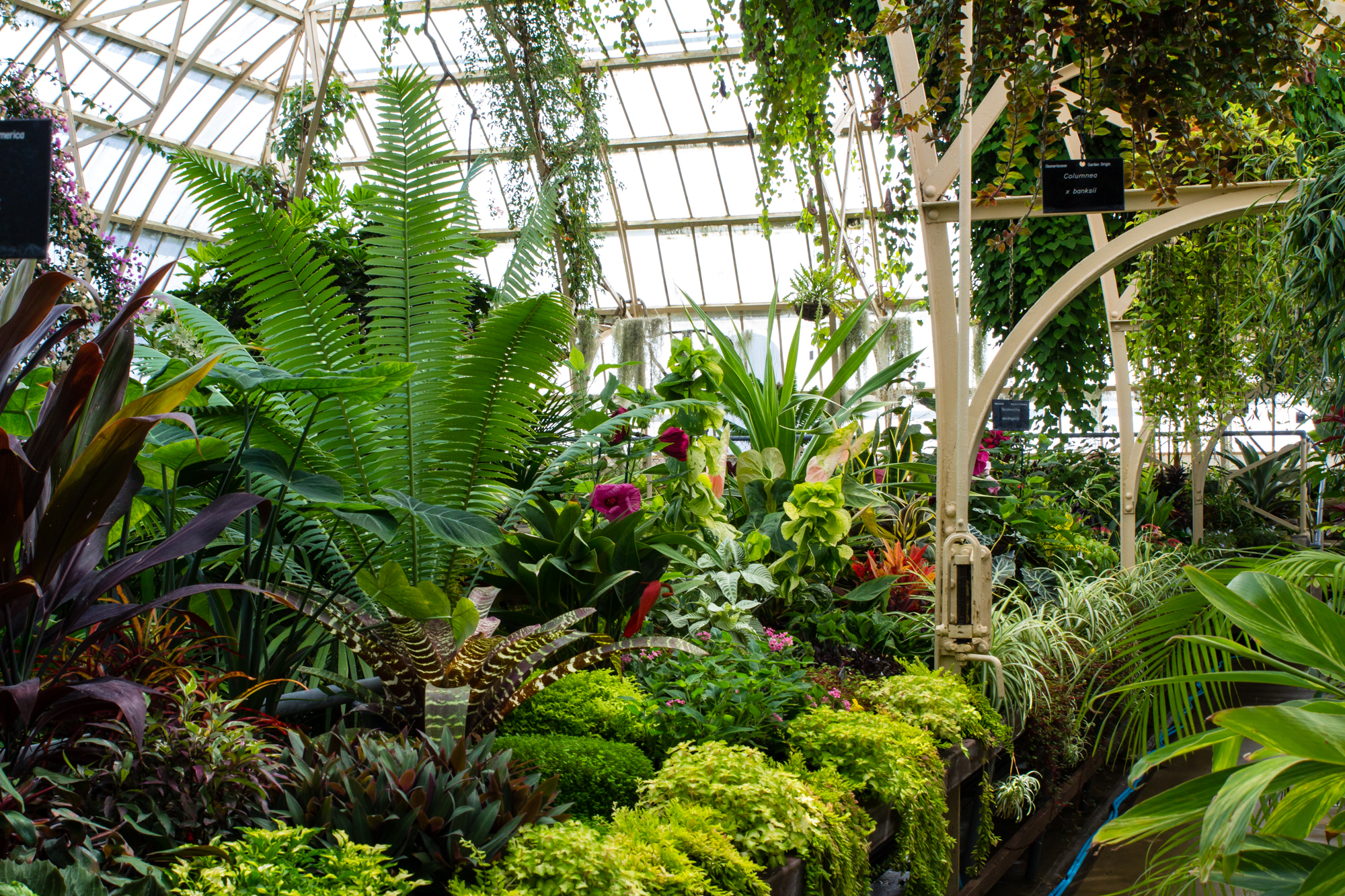
Cuningham House

- Cuningham House

Cuningham House (originally called Winter Gardens) was built in 1923 and opened on 9 August 1924. It is a large, stately structure of architectural importance and is listed with the Heritage New Zealand Pouhere Taonga. A spacious staircase leads to a large peripheral gallery where an extensive collection of tropical plants are displayed such as Dieffenbachia, Peperomia, Hoya, Banana palms, Anthurium and Dracaena. In 2020, a corpse flower bloomed in the house, which was a popular attraction leading to long queues and an extended opening time.

- Townend House

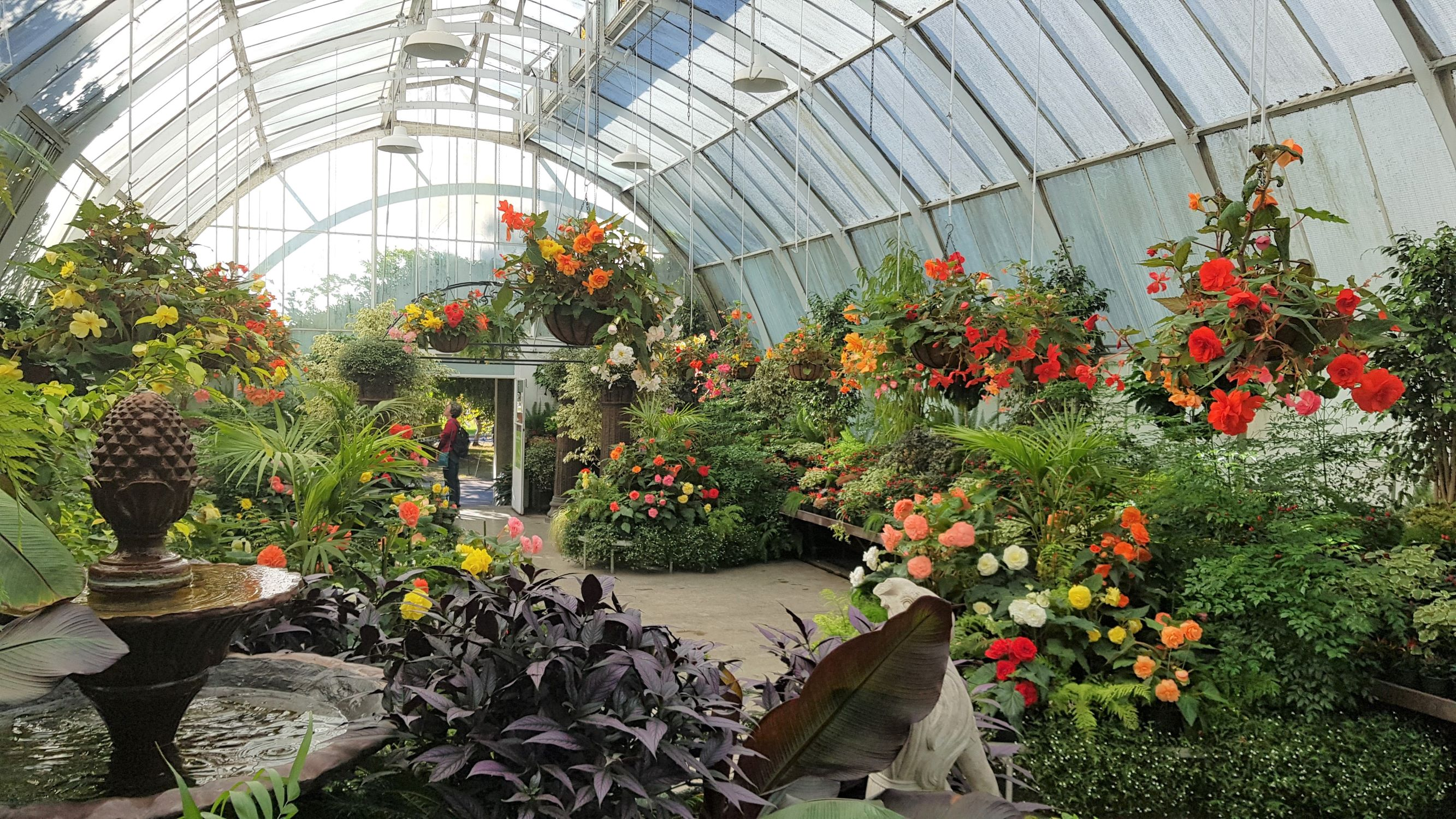
Townend House

The original Townend House was purchased and transferred from the grand Christchurch residence of 'Holly Lea' with funds from the estate of Annie Townend, a wealthy Christchurch heiress, who also owned Mona Vale. The present Townend House was erected in 1955 to 1956 on the site of the former house of the same name. Townend House is essentially a flowering conservatory where a regular succession of popular greenhouse plants are grown. These include Calceolaria, Cyclamen, Begonias, Impatiens and Primula.

- Garrick House

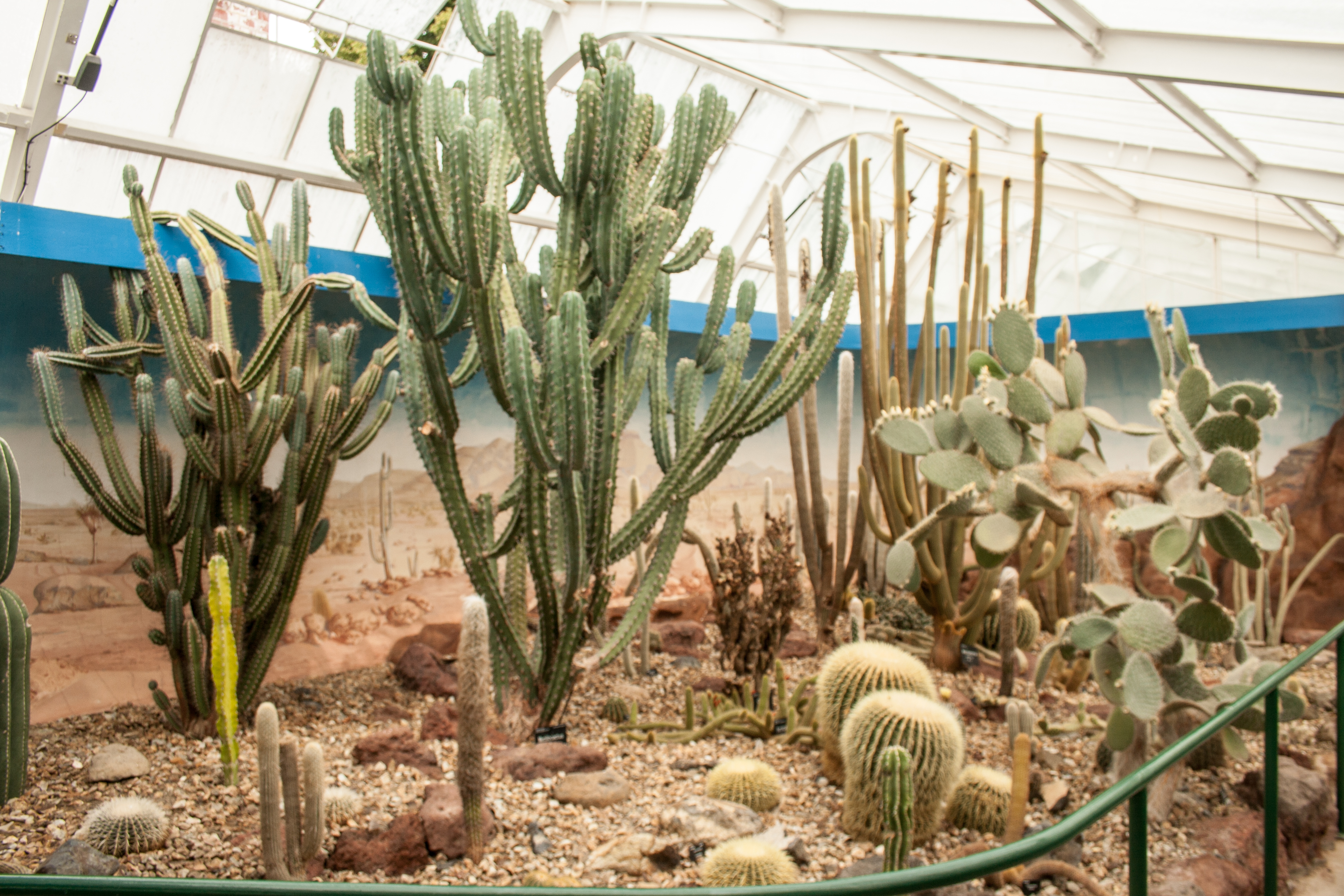
Cacti Display in Garrick House

It contains the most extensive publicly owned collection of cacti and succulents in New Zealand and also includes a diorama painted by Gordon Gee, the sign and label writer for the Botanic Gardens from 1956 to 1974. The diorama depicts a desert scene representing from South Africa to South America.

- Gilpin House

Built-in the 1960s, Gilpin House is a modest-sized conservatory featuring tropical collections of Orchids, Tillandsias, Bromeliads and carnivorous plants.

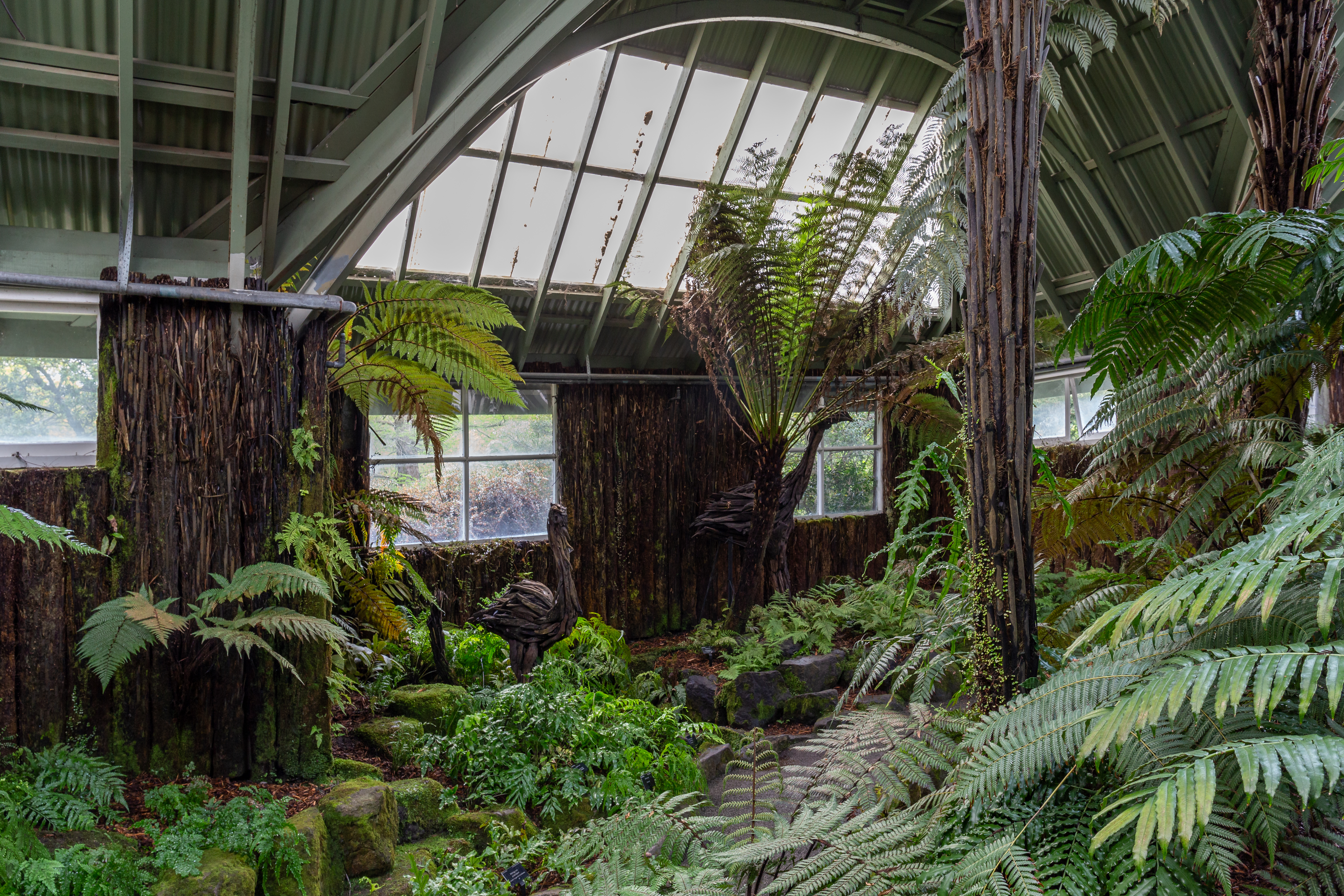
The Fern House

- Fern House

The Fern House or Fernery was constructed in 1955 as a result of bequests from Mary Rothney Orr and James Foster. A narrow meandering path winds through collections of New Zealand ferns, the most significant of these being a New Zealand icon the silver fern. Beneath the path a gentle stream moves through the house creating a perfect environment for moisture-loving ferns such as Asplenium and Blechnum.

- Foweraker House

Foweraker House was named for Jean Foweraker, a Christchurch alpine plant enthusiast and donor of many collections of alpine plants to the gardens. The displays of both indigenous and exotic alpine plants frequently change as do the seasons, flowers and foliage. In addition, there is a permanent display of slow-growing conifers that create a neutral looking environment in which the alpine plants can be appreciated.

== Bird life ==
The gardens and the wider area of Hagley Park provide a central city refuge for up to forty species of introduced and native birds. The kererū is a solid bird with a glossy green upper body, mauve back and white breast. Able to digest larger fruits and broadcast the seed, the pigeon has a key role in native forest renewal with its thudding wingbeats heard well before it is seen. Other native bush-dwellers are the sleek olive green bellbird, more often heard than seen, and the acrobatic New Zealand fantail which flits about in search of insects. Flocks of silvereye twitter and feed together while tiny riroriro are also common. The most common bush birds – blackbird, thrush, starling and house sparrow – were introduced in the 1860s.

== Other attractions ==
- Paddling Pool and Playground

There is a playground located within the gardens. Close by the playground a Jurassic period species, Wollemi Pine was planted in 2013, the first of its plantings in New Zealand.

- Climatological station

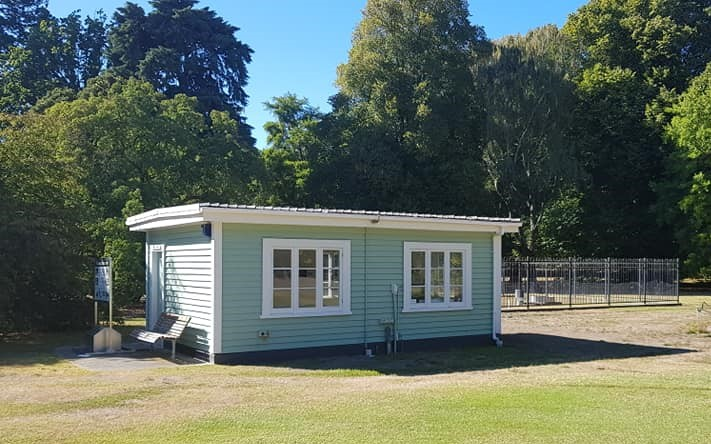
Magnetic Observatory

The Climatological Station has provided daily readings for well over a century. Gardens staff record the information at 9 am each day. Cloud cover, visibility, wind direction, rainfall and other details are forwarded to the national Meteorological Service. The 1940s wooden building beside the Climatological Station is a remnant of the Magnetic Observatory set up here in 1901. In 1897 Adolf Schmidt proposed a magnetic field observatory to improve the distribution of magnetic observatories across the world; there were then 4 in Britain and 5 in Japan, but only 3 south of the equator; Jakarta, Mauritius and Melbourne. In 1901 a magnetograph house, an absolute house (for celestial and magnetic measurements) and an office and seismograph room were built. The observatory was famously used by both Captain Robert Falcon Scott and Sir Ernest Shackleton's Antarctic teams to make magnetic surveys in preparation for their expeditions. However, electrification of the tramways in 1905 interfered with the magnetic measurements. As a result, between 1912 and 1929, a new observatory was set up at Amberley, though some of the work continued until the land reverted to Christchurch City Council in 1970. GNS now does the work at Eyrewell.

- Kate Sheppard Memorial Walk

The Kate Sheppard Memorial Walk opened in 1990 to commemorate a pioneer who fought hard to achieve the right for New Zealand women to vote. The white camellia became a lasting symbol of women's suffrage and achievement in New Zealand. Canterbury women's groups gifted 100 camellias to the gardens in 1990, forming the beginnings of the Kate Sheppard Memorial Walk. In 1993, a new variety of white camellia, named Kate Sheppard, was created to mark the 100th anniversary of the successful campaign.

== Recent events ==
- 2011 Christchurch Earthquake

The Christchurch Botanic Gardens tea kiosk was closed due to damage from the 2011 Christchurch earthquake. Upon repair, the kiosk temporarily housed the Enchanted Garden exhibition by artist Jenny Gillies but is now the home of the Canterbury Horticultural Society.

- 2019 Mosque Shooting

After the Christchurch mosque shootings, Christchurch residents and visitors placed flowers, cards and teddy bears against the Botanical Gardens wall as they mourned for those killed and sought a way to show love to the Muslim community.

Gallery of the Christchurch Botanic Gardens
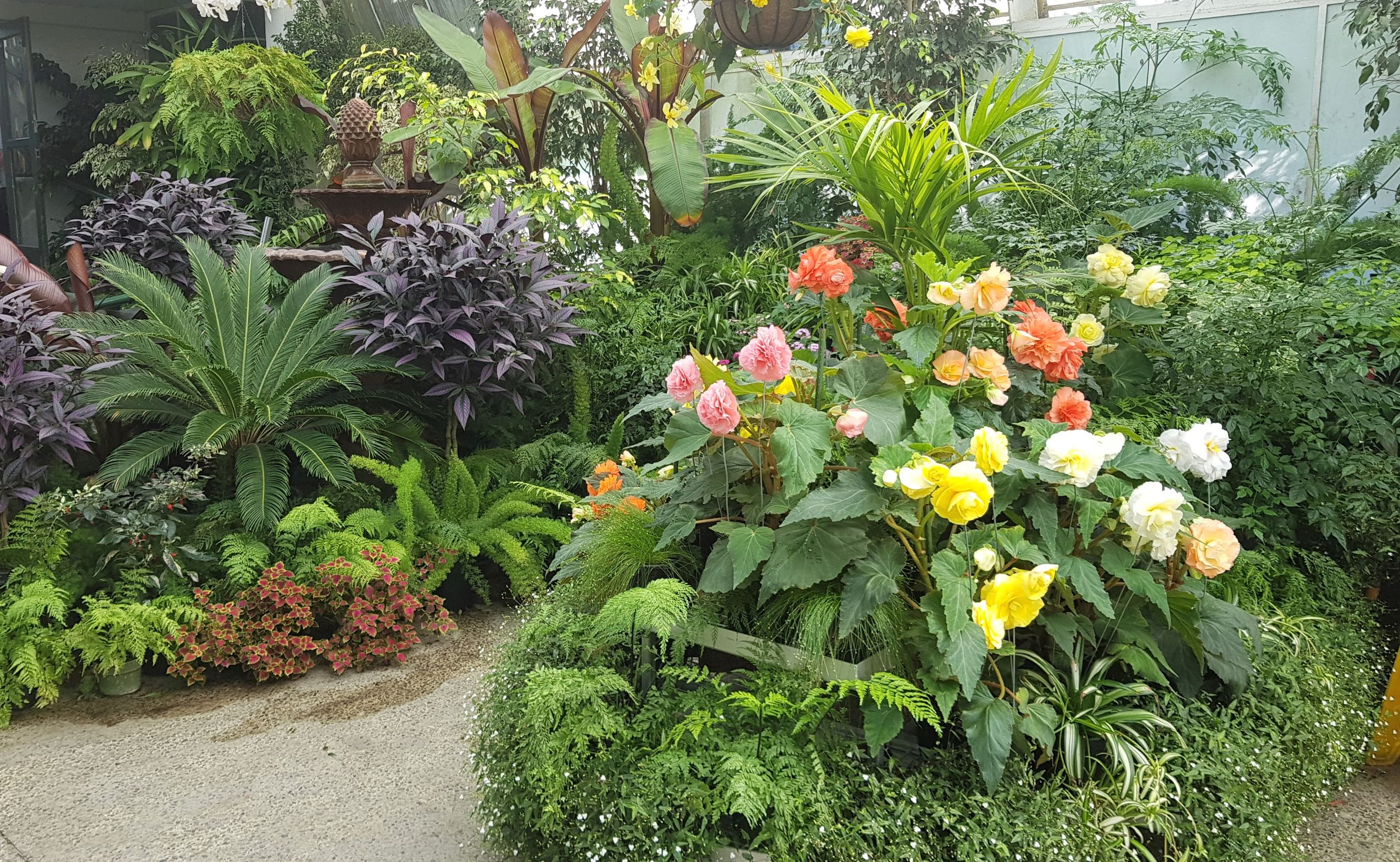
Townend House floral display

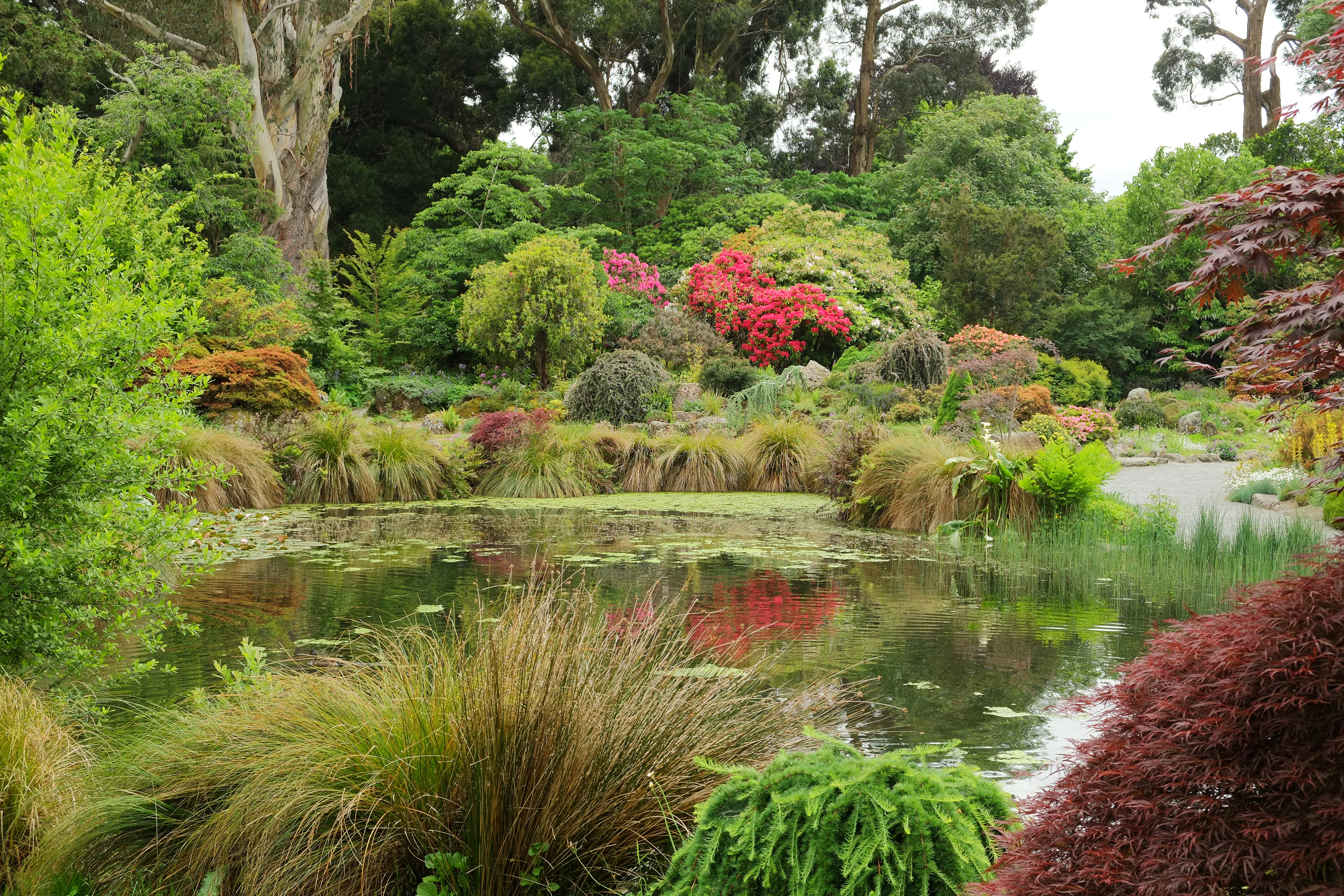
The pond in front of the Rock garden

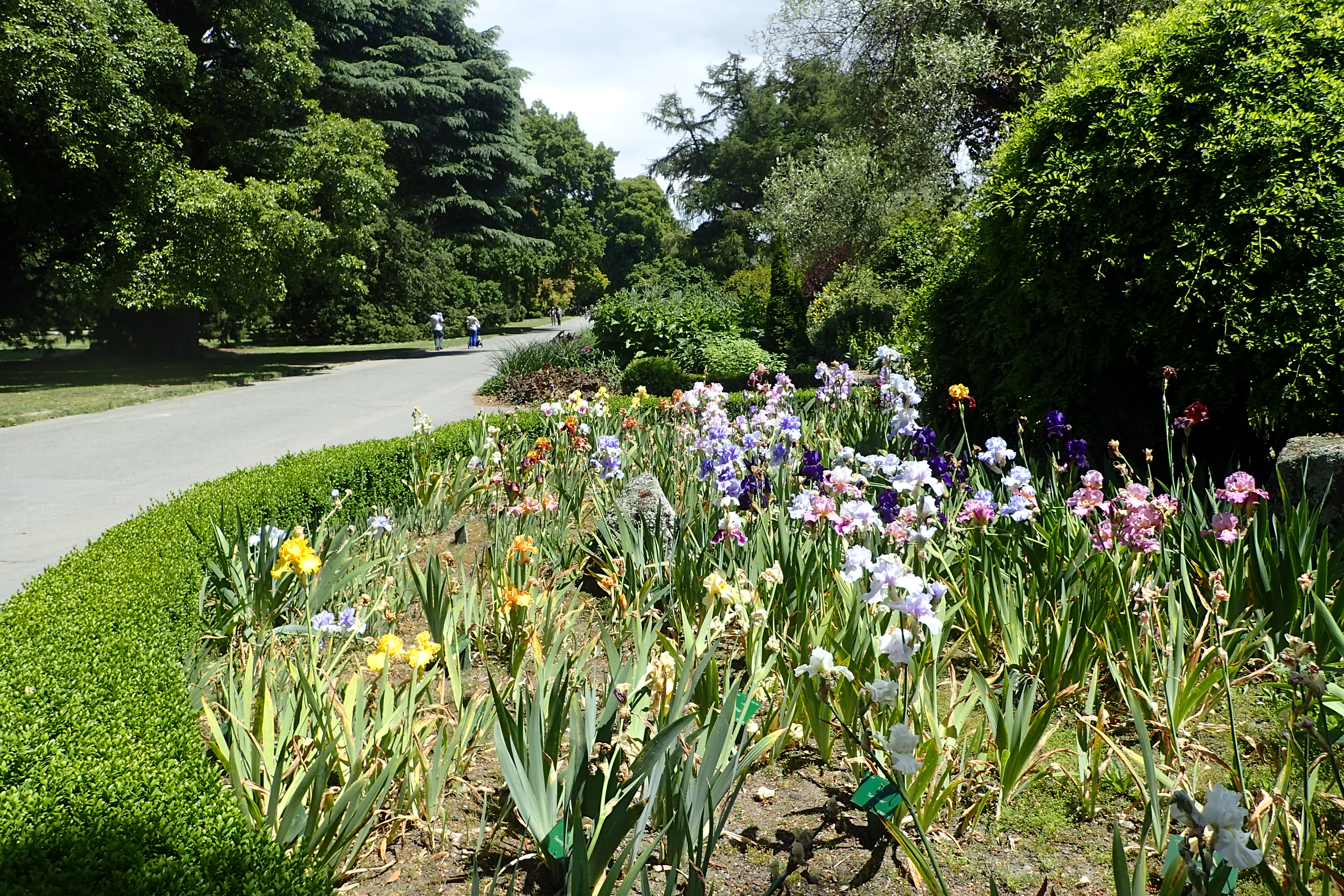
The herbaceous border

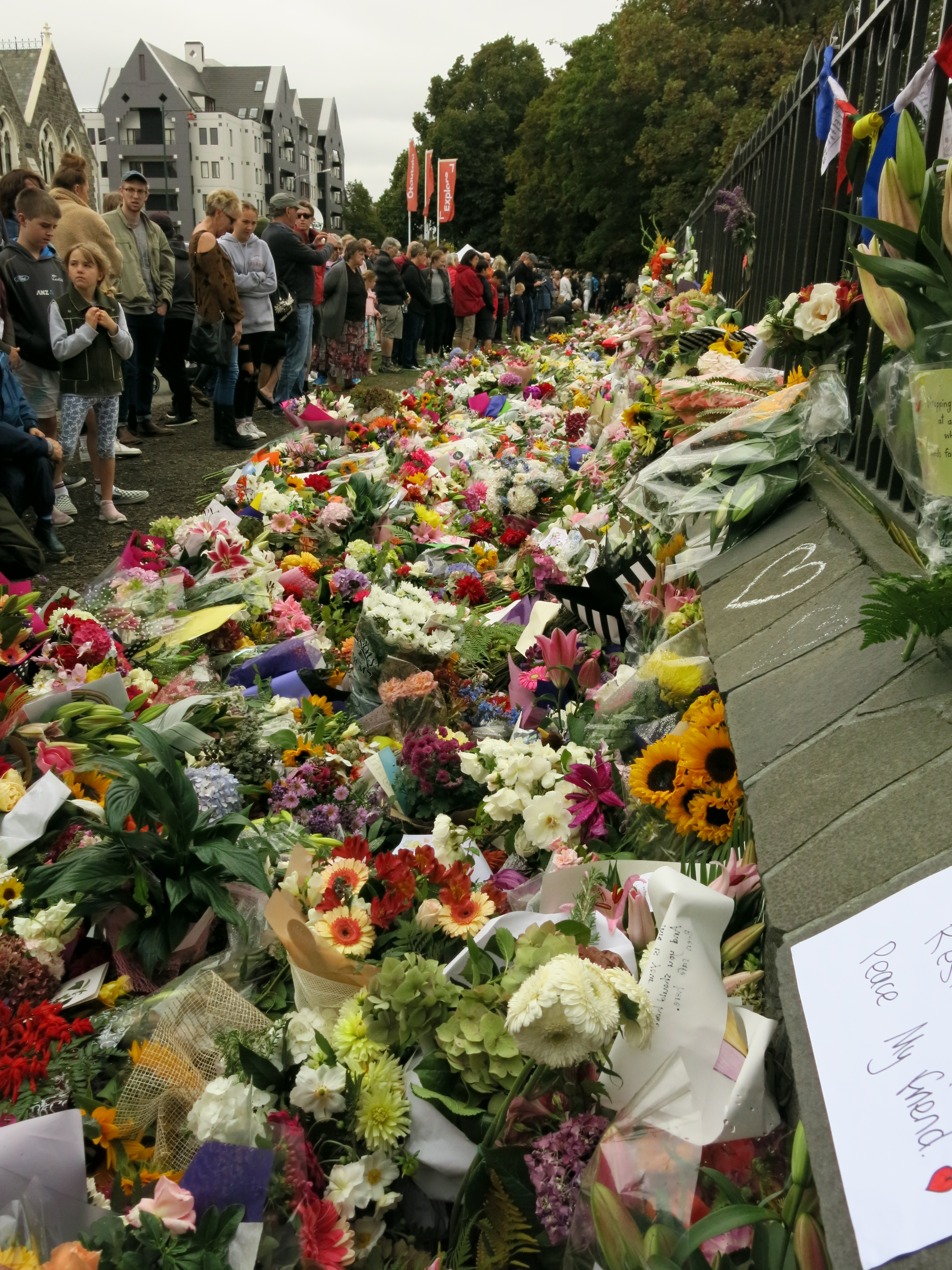
Flowers and tributes for the victims of the Christchurch mosque shootings

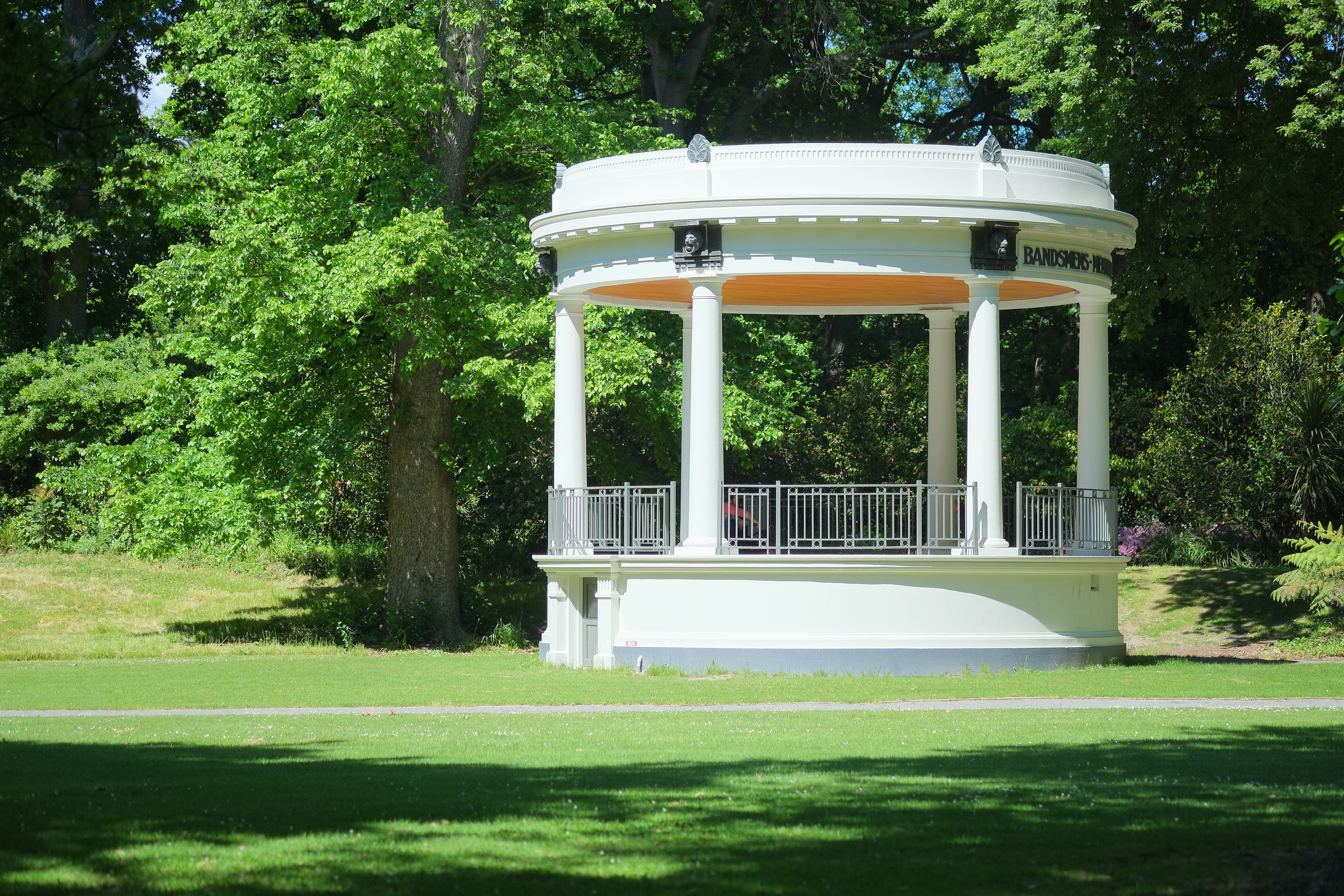
Bandsmen's Memorial Rotunda

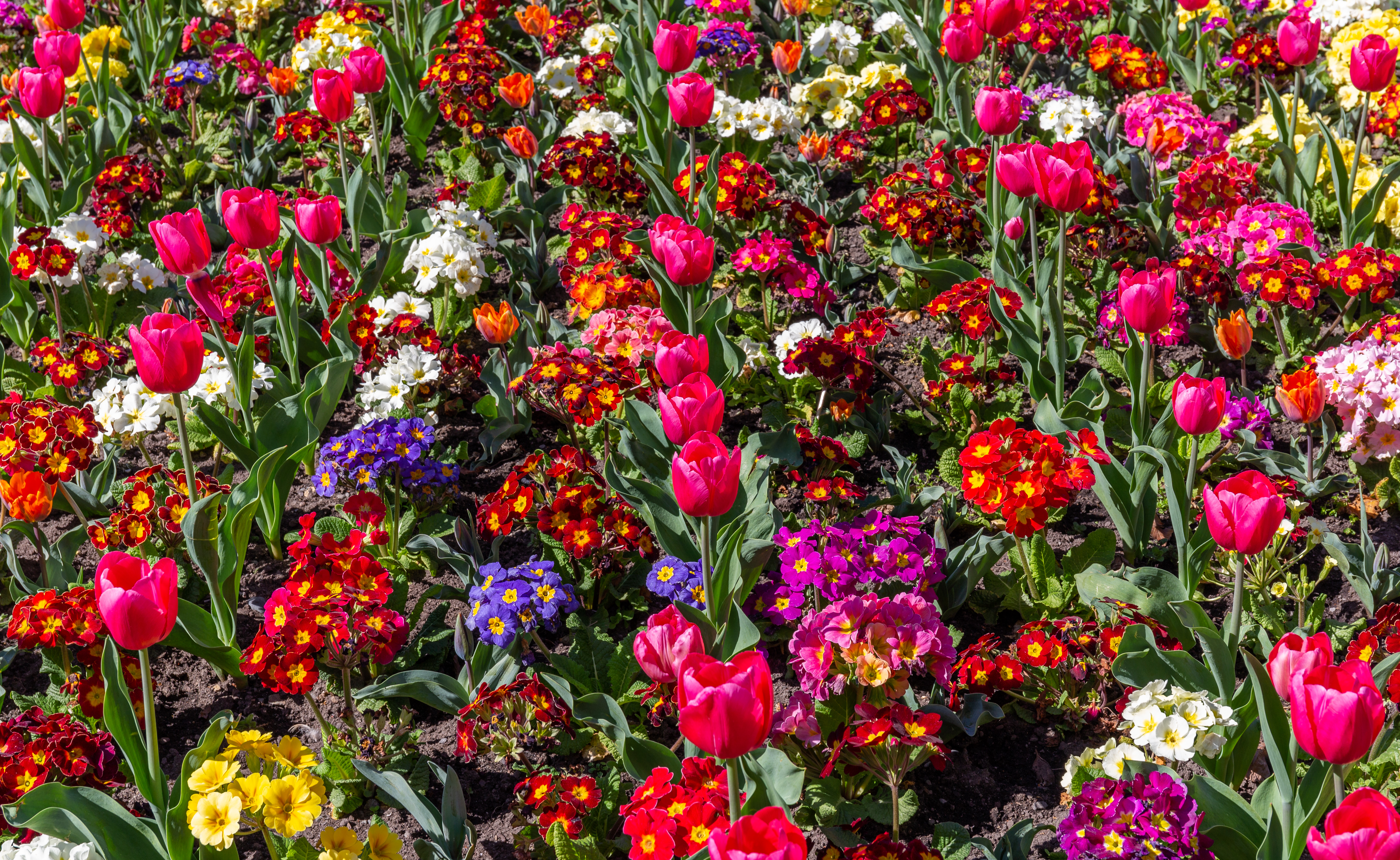
Blossoming flowers

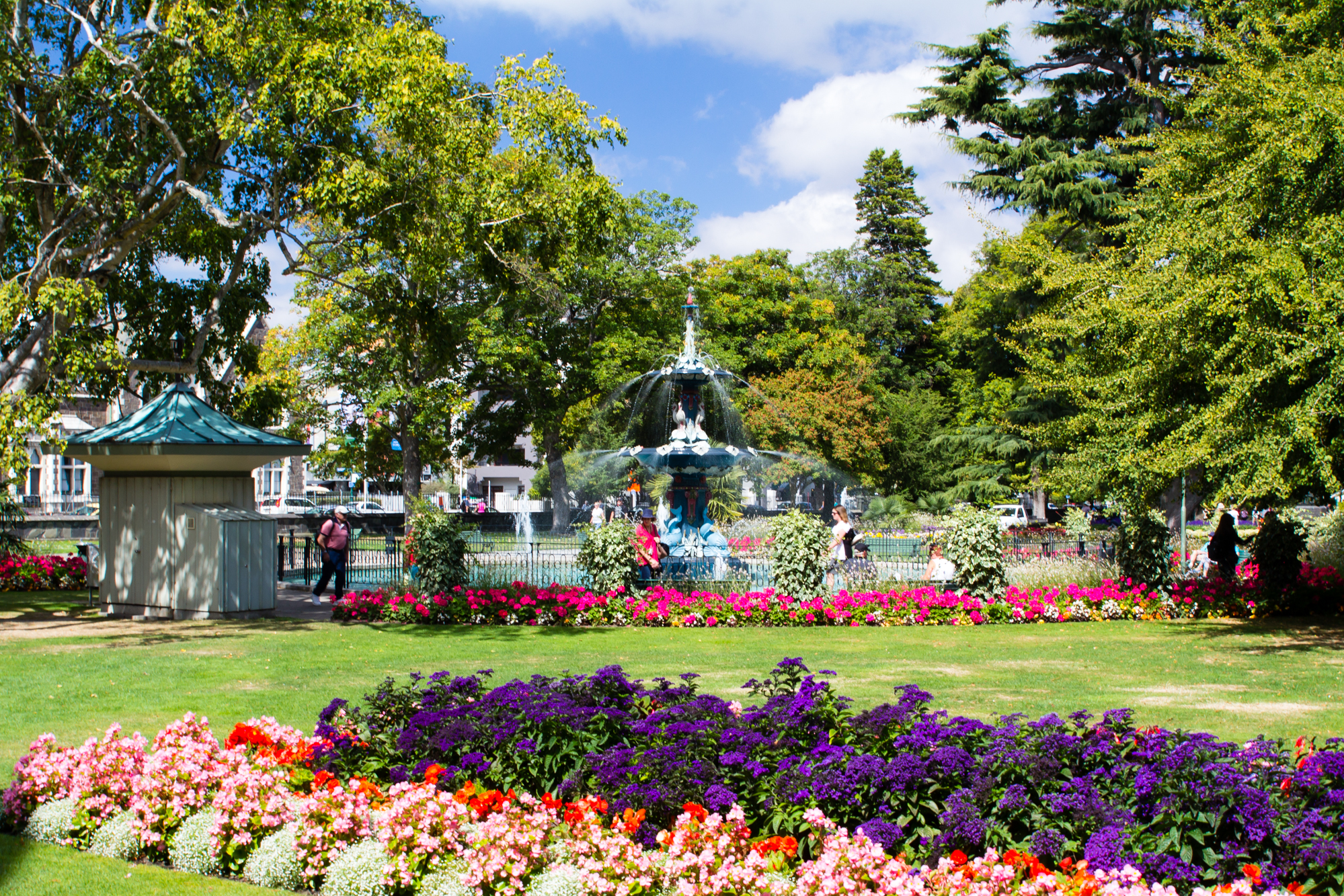
Peacock Fountain

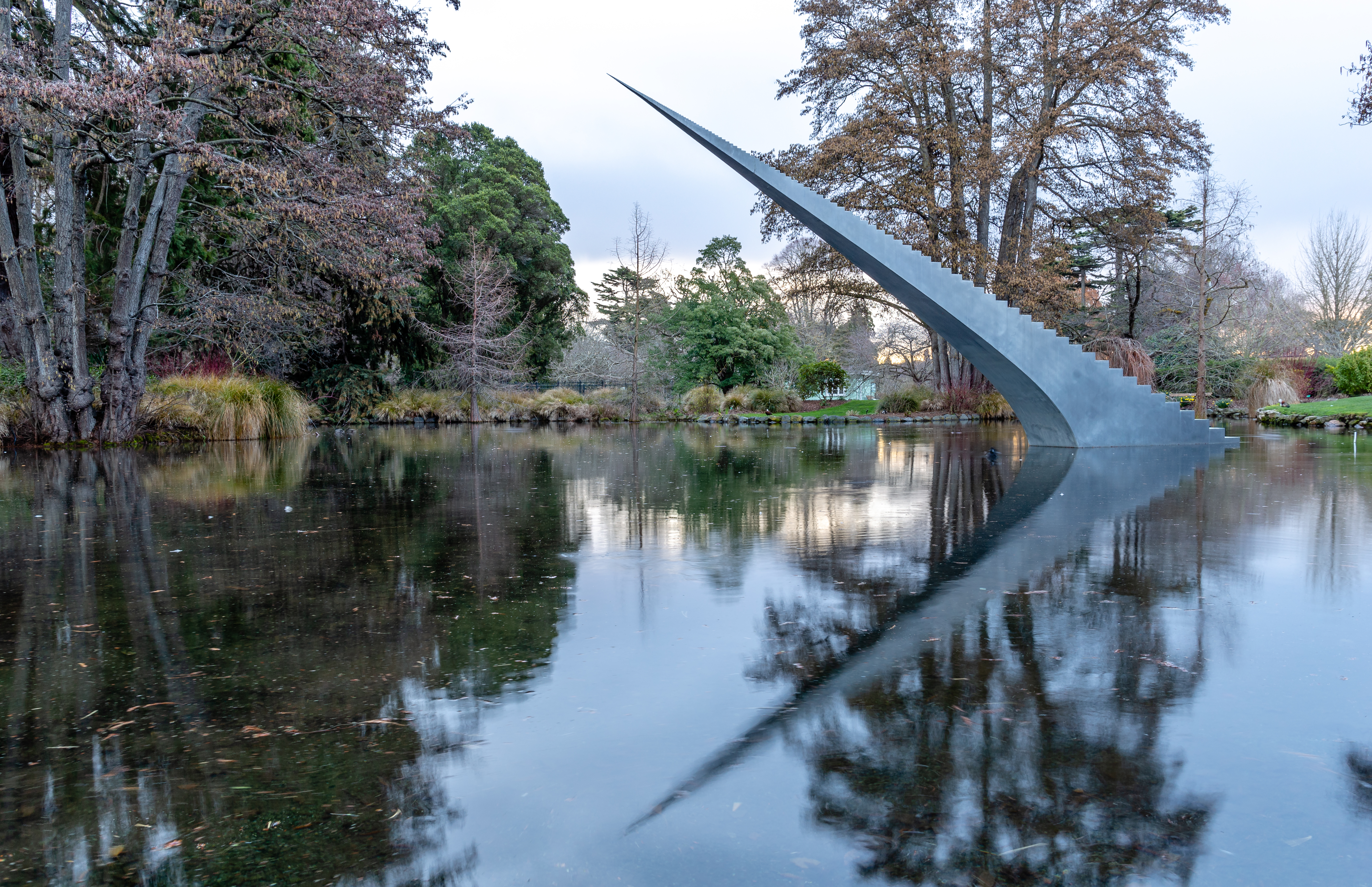
Diminish And Ascend, artistic piece

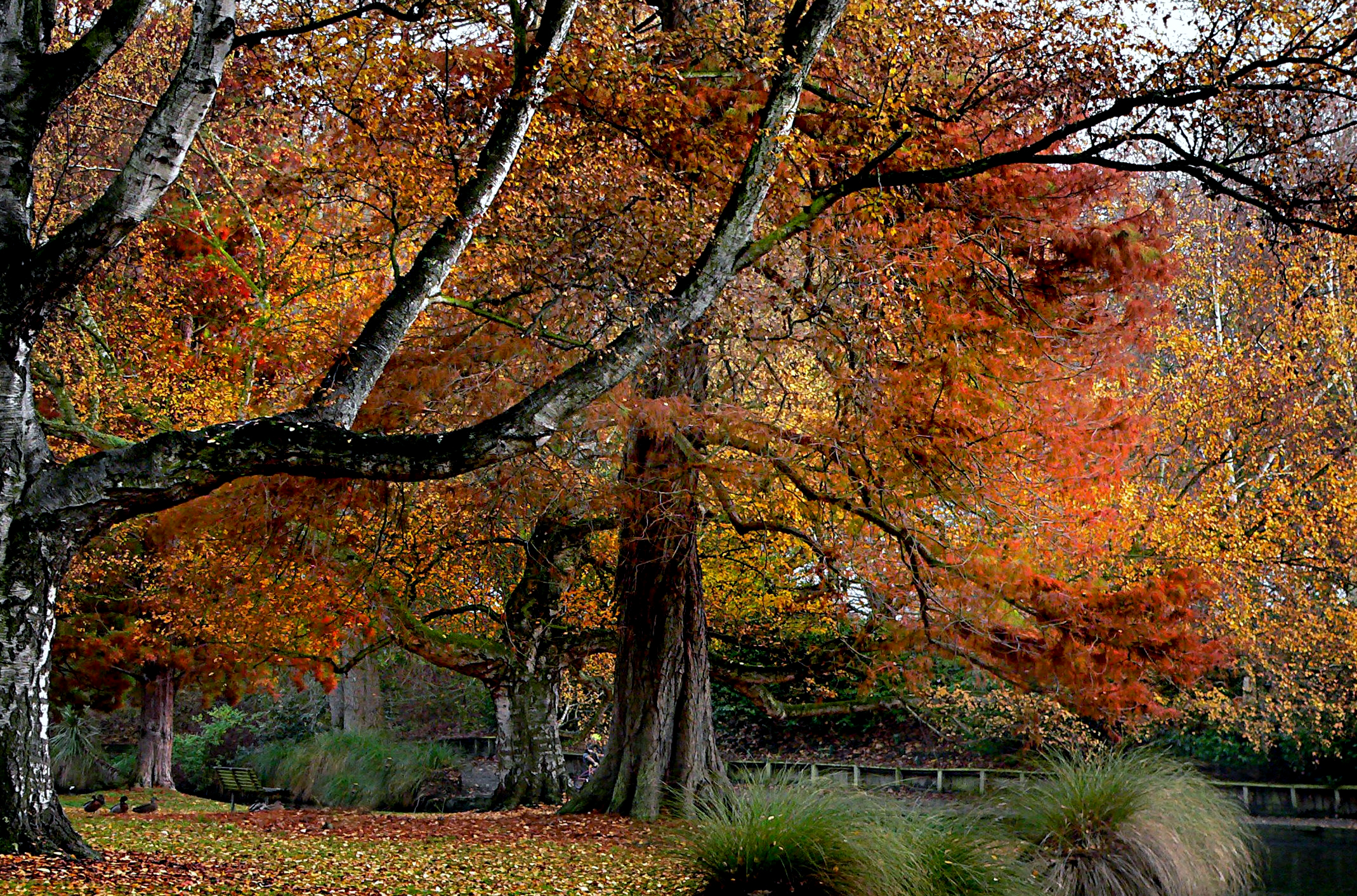
Autumn Trees

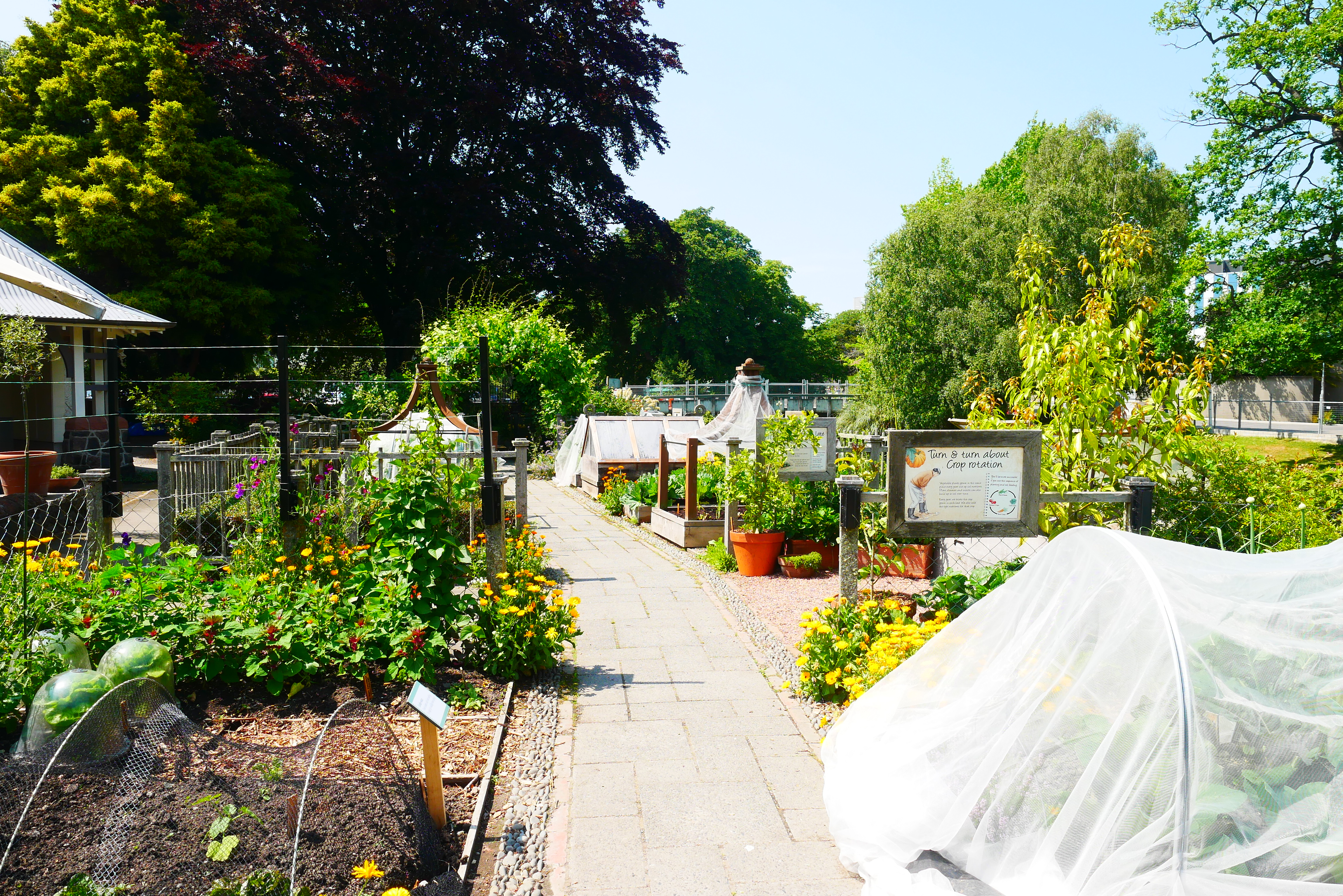
Curator's House Herb garden
