= Rubus swinhoei =

Scientific classification
- Kingdom: Plantae
- Clade: Embryophytes
- Clade: Tracheophytes
- Clade: Spermatophytes
- Clade: Angiosperms
- Clade: Eudicots
- Clade: Rosids
- Order: Rosales
- Family: Rosaceae
- Genus: Rubus
- Species: R. swinhoei

Binomial name
- Rubus swinhoei Hance

Synonyms
- Rubus adenanthus Finet & Franch.; Rubus adenotrichopodus Hayata; Rubus hupehensis Oliv.; Rubus moluccanus var. swinhoei (Hance) Kuntze; Rubus swinhoei var. hupehensis (Oliv.) F.P.Metcalf

Species of flowering plant

Rubus swinhoei, commonly known as Swinhoe's raspberry, wood berry, Keelung rubus, Jingbai rubus, and Libai rubus, is an East Asian species of bramble.

== Description ==
The stem is a semi-evergreen shrub 1 to 4 metres (3 1/2 to 13 feet) high. It is dark purple-brown, with gray-white pubescence when young and glabrous when old. The shape of the leaf varies greatly, from lanceolate to broadly ovate, 5 to 11 centimetres (2 to 4 1/4 inches) in length and 2.5 to 5 cm (1 to 2 in) in width, with a pointed tip and a shallow cordiform base. Soft hairs run along the veins with the lower surface tomentose or subglabrous. The adaxial surface of the leaf is tomentose, leaf margin ciliate or glabrous, serrated, with 0 to 12 pairs of leaf veins. The petiole is 0.5 to 1.5 cm (1/4 to 1/2 in) in length, with purple-brown glandular hairs and a sparse spine with tomentum.

The flower buds are hairy and serrated, ovate or triangular sepals, 0.5–0.8 cm (1/4–3/8 in) long with gray-white hair, pointed apex, and margins entire. From May to June, racemes of 5 to 6 flowers are borne. The stalks and sepals are 0.1 to 0.3 cm (1/16 to 1/8 in) long, with purple-brown glandular hairs. The flowerhead is 1–1.5 cm (3/8–5/8 in) in diameter, with the slender stalk measuring 1–3 cm long. The flowerhead is reflexed during the fruiting time with ovate to round white, hoary petals. The stamen is mostly glabrous at the base of the filaments and swollen. The pistil is longer than the stamens. The ovary is glabrous. The fruiting period is from July to August. The spherical fruit measures 1–1.5 cm across and is composed of glabrous drupes that turn from red-green-purple to black-purple when ripe. The fruit core has a wrinkled texture with a sour taste.

== Taxonomy ==
The specimen was first collected in April 1864 in Tamsui, Taiwan, by R. Oldham, a British collector, collection number 142. The holotype specimen is kept in London’s Natural History Museum. Henry Fletcher Hance first published the scientific name in the Annales des Sciences Naturelles botanical journal, in 1866.

The species is named after naturalist Robert Swinhoe (1836–1877) for his contributions on Taiwan's fauna and flora.

== Distribution and habitat ==
Rubus swinhoei is native to central and southern China and Taiwan. In northern and central Taiwan it grows in plains, foothills, plains, and mountains from 10 to 900 m (33 to 2,953 ft) in elevation.

== Conservation ==
Red List of Vascular Plants of Taiwan, 2017: No immediate threat.

== Uses ==
The berries are edible.
