= Maffra West Upper =

- Town
- Coordinates: 37.9°S 146.85°E
- Country: Australia
- State: Victoria
- LGA: Shire of Wellington
- Location: 22 km (14 mi) W of Maffra; 214 km (133 mi) E of Melbourne; 84 km (52 mi) N of Heyfield

Government
  - State electorate: Gippsland East
  - Federal division: Gippsland
- Elevation: 27 m (89 ft)

Population
  - Total: 82 (2016 census)
- Postcode: 3860
- Mean max temp: 20.0 °C (68.0 °F)
- Mean min temp: 8.1 °C (46.6 °F)
- Annual rainfall: 581.9 mm (22.91 in)

Maffra West Upper is a locality in Victoria, Australia, located on Upper Maffra Road, north west of Maffra, in the Shire of Wellington.

Upper Maffra West Post Office opened on 25 July 1887, was renamed Maffra West Upper in 1889 and closed in 1966.
