= Sawtell =

Sawtell may refer to:

== People ==
- E. Rosa Sawtell (1865–1940), New Zealand painter
- Henry Sawtell (1832–1913), mayor of Christchurch, New Zealand
- Paul Sawtell (1906–1971), film score composer

== Places ==
- Sawtell, New South Wales, Australia
- Sawtell Peak, Idaho, United States

== See also ==
- Sawtelle (disambiguation)
