= Michael Hart (mayor) =

New Zealand politician (1814–1878)

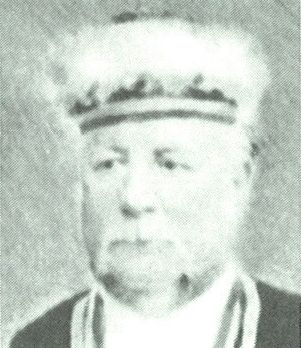
- Portrait of Michael Hart

7th Mayor of Christchurch
- In office 17 December 1873 – 16 December 1874
- Preceded by: Edward Bishop
- Succeeded by: Fred Hobbs

Personal details
- Born: c. 1814 Freshford, Somerset, England
- Died: 9 August 1878 Freshford House, Lichfield Street, Christchurch
- Spouse(s): Mary Anne Hart (d. 1866); Ellen Gardner (m. 1866)

Michael Brannan Hart (c. 1814 – 9 August 1878) was the publican of the White Hart Hotel in Christchurch, New Zealand, that stood on the corner of High and Cashel Streets. It was Christchurch's first hotel. Hart, originally from Freshford, Somerset, England, was one of the first settlers of Christchurch. He was a colourful character and stood for elections to the Canterbury Provincial Council and Parliament, but was unsuccessful. He was elected onto Christchurch City Council in 1869, and was chosen as Mayor of Christchurch 1873–1874 by his fellow councillors. He gave the first chain to the Christchurch mayoral chain. He was the first mayor to wear regalia, modelled on the robes of the Lord Mayor of London. He intended to leave the robes to Christchurch City Council, but after a disagreement, he changed his will and the robes were buried with him.

== Early life ==
Hart was born probably in 1814 in Freshford, Somerset, England. His parents were Paul Hart (yeoman, later a shearer) and his wife Mary Brennan (m. 28 October 1804). He was a plumber before he emigrated.

Hart arrived in Lyttelton with his wife, Mary Ann Hart (née Swan), and their sons Michael Brannan (1843–1908) and George Robert (1841–1911) on the Cressy on 27 December 1850, one of the First Four Ships reaching Canterbury. He was briefly in business in Lyttelton as a plumber with Henry Allwright.

== White Hart Hotel ==
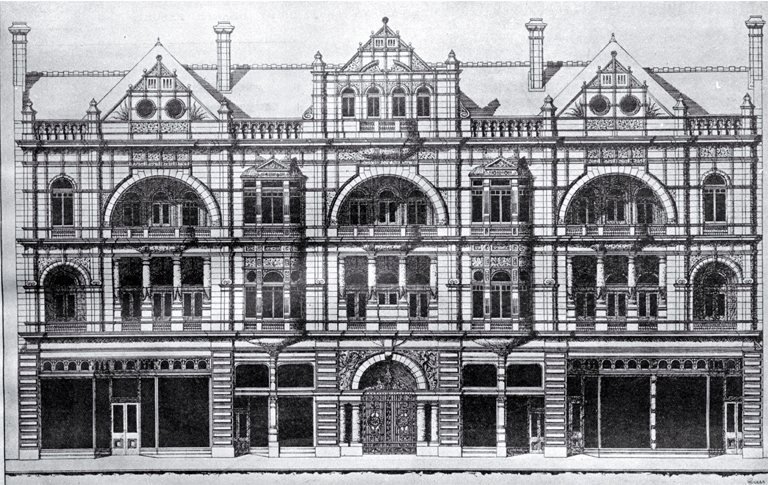
White Hart Hotel, 1902 proposed design

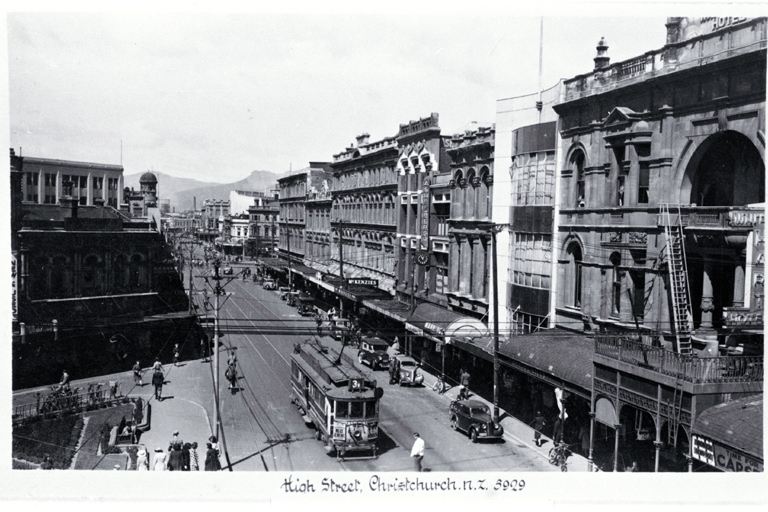
High Street during the 1940s, with the White Hart Hotel on the right

Hart and his family soon moved to Christchurch. Together with Charles Day of Sydney, he bought the block of land on the south-western side of High Street between Cashel Street and Lichfield Street. The family first lived on the site in a tent before Hart built an A-frame hut.

On the High Street (then called Sumner Road) and Cashel Street corner, Hart founded the White Hart, the first hotel in Christchurch. The hotel opened on 15 November 1851, less than a year after the organised settlement of Christchurch. On 16 December 1852, Hart catered for 150 guests who had assembled to farewell John Robert Godley, the founder of Canterbury who returned to England after his short stay in the colony. Hart bought out Day in September 1854 for £525. A new building was built on the site in 1866.

The trustees of the Hart estate decided to rebuild the White Hart Hotel in 1902. A design competition was called for and won by Sidney Luttrell. This competition win was the impetus for the Launceston-based Luttrell Brothers to move to Christchurch. The 1902 design, estimated to have cost £25,000, was not built due to the No Licence vote at the election that year. A plainer design was built in 1905, which burned down three years later. A new building was erected behind the façade.

The photo from the 1940s shows the White Hart Hotel to the right of the building that is these days occupied by Cheapskates. The site of the hotel is these days occupied by the Westpac high rise, which is soon to be demolished due to damage sustained in the February 2011 Christchurch earthquake.

== Political career ==
Hart stood for election to the Canterbury Provincial Council on several occasions and was always unsuccessful. Hart contested the November 1857 election for the 2nd Council, where six candidates stood for four positions in the Town of Christchurch electorate. Hart came fifth, only one vote behind the fourth candidate; the successful candidates were Richard Packer (165 votes), Charles Wellington Bishop (160 votes), Charles Berjew Fooks (152 votes) and Thomas Cass (96 votes).

The 18 January 1860 Town of Christchurch by-election, caused by the resignation of Richard Packer from the Christchurch electorate, was contested by Hart and Henry Sewell, who had been New Zealand's first Premier in 1856. It was the general expectation that Sewell would be elected unopposed, but he faced strong criticism by the Lyttelton Times, whilst generally endorsing him for his obvious ability, the newspaper was demanding from him that he publicly talk about his policies and plans. Sewell eventually arranged a public meeting the evening prior to nomination day; this was the only public meeting during the election campaign. After a lengthy address, which was favourably received by the Lyttelton Times, Hart put his name forward at that meeting. Sewell won the election two days later.

Hart returned to England for a few years. He returned and was elected to the Christchurch Town Council in 1869. Before 1916, elections for town, then city council, were held annually. Hart was again elected in 1872 and 1874.

At the Christchurch City Council meeting on 17 December 1873, the outgoing mayor, Edward Bishop, was thanked for his service and presented by the city councillors with a gift. The councillors then proceeded to elect the next mayor from their midst. Councillor Calvert proposed Hart as mayor, as he had shown administrative skill as the chairman of the works committee. Councillor Fred Hobbs seconded the motion and Hart was elected unanimously. The former mayors William Wilson, John Anderson, James Jameson and Henry Sawtell were present at the meeting. Hart wore regalia at the occasion; the first Christchurch mayor to do so. It was a copy of the robes worn by the Lord Mayors of London and Hart had it made at his own cost. He also gave the first link to the Christchurch mayoral chain.

During his term as mayor, the City Outfall Drain through Linwood, designed by Cornelius Cuff, was completed. Hart formally opened the drain by pouring a bottle of champagne into it.

At the Christchurch City Council meeting on 16 December 1874, a new mayor was elected. The councillors decided unanimously on Fred Hobbs as the successor to Hart. Since his election of mayor almost exactly one year earlier, it was the first time that Hart wore the mayoral robes again. Hart intended to leave the robes to Christchurch City Council, but after a disagreement, he changed his will and the robes got buried with him on his death.

== Family and death ==
Hart's first wife died on 1 June 1866 aged 53 years, and she was buried at Addington Cemetery. Hart remarried only a month later, on 3 July 1866, to Ellen Gardiner, witnessed by John Ollivier and William Wilson. They had five girls and one boy together. Hart died on 9 August 1878 at his home 'Freshford' in Lichfield Street, Christchurch. He was buried at Barbadoes Street Cemetery. He had been ill for some time and not taken part in public life owing to illness.

His second wife remarried on 19 February 1879 to Richard Norman Newby. Ellen Newby died in 1904 in Beckenham. She was buried at Barbadoes Street Cemetery.

Hartley Avenue in Strowan is named after his son Leonard Brannon Hart (1874–1960). Michael Hart gave the land for the first Town Hall, which was built on the corner of Hereford Street and Cathedral Square, from where one would look down Sumner Road (since renamed High Street).

Political offices
Preceded by Edward Bishop	Mayor of Christchurch; 1873–1874	Succeeded by Fred Hobbs
