= Sawtelle =

Sawtelle may refer to:

- Alice Sawtelle (1863–1909), American classicist and poet
- Cullen Sawtelle (1805–1887), American politician
- Vashti Sawtelle, American physicist
- William Henry Sawtelle (1868–1934), American judge
- Sawtelle, Los Angeles, neighborhood in West Los Angeles
  - Sawtelle Boulevard
  - Sawtelle Veterans Home
  - Sawtelle (Pacific Electric)

== See also ==
- Sawtell (disambiguation)
