= Isaac Luck =

New Zealand builder, architect and politician (1817–1881)

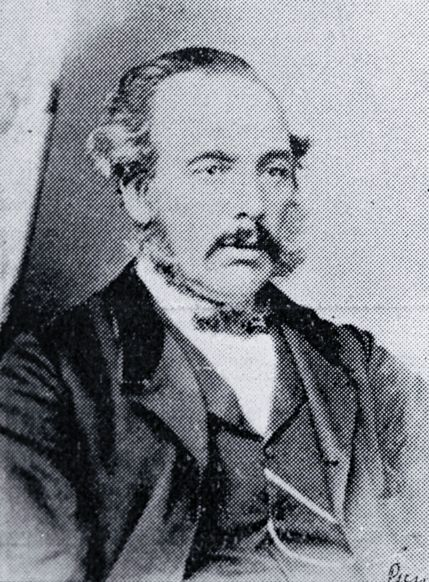
- Isaac Luck in c. 1860

3rd Chairman of the Christchurch Town Council
- Preceded by: John Ollivier
- Succeeded by: Edward Bishop

Personal details
- Born: 12 May 1817 Oxford, England
- Died: 15 December 1881 (aged 64) Bristol, England
- Spouse: Susan Luck
- Profession: Builder, architect

Isaac Luck (12 May 1817 – 15 December 1881) was a New Zealand architect. A professional builder, he arrived in Lyttelton on the Steadfast in 1851. He was the third chairman of the Christchurch Town Council. He was the brother-in-law of and in partnership with Benjamin Mountfort, and was the less well-known architectural partner for the design of the Canterbury Provincial Council Buildings.

== Early life ==
Luck was born in 1817 in Oxford, England; his parents were Jesse and Mary Luck. He worked in a partnership with John Plowman the younger as builder and architect. Some of his buildings in England include the Littlemore Lunatic Asylum (1846, as builder), the parsonage at Burton Dassett (1847, as architect), additions to the Oxford Lunatic Asylum (1847, as architect), and additions to the Union Poor House in Faringdon (1849, as builder). He was the surveyor for the demolition of the old Aylesbury Prison. His partnership with Plowman was dissolved in 1850.

== New Zealand ==
=== Builder and architect ===
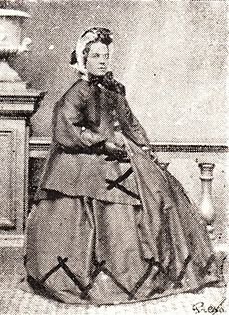
Susanna Luck, the sister of Benjamin Mountfort, married Isaac Luck in April 1853

Luck arrived in Lyttelton on the Steadfast on 9 June 1851. In 1852, Luck built the Church of the Most Holy Trinity in Lyttelton, which was architect Benjamin Mountfort's first commission in New Zealand. The building proved vulnerable to high winds and was considered unsafe. It was demolished in 1857.

During an 1852 visit to Christchurch of the Governor, George Grey, it was agreed that the government would pay for a lock-up. Luck built the structure on the corner of Armagh Street and Cambridge Terrace at the Market Place, which measured only 10 by 20 feet (3.0 m × 6.1 m), and which was built by June of that year. What was long talked about afterwards was that upon completion, he held a ball in it for his friends.

Luck was the builder of the original wooden St Peter's Church in Upper Riccarton, which was consecrated in 1858 by Bishop Harper. The architectural design work for the later stone church was started by Mountfort.

Luck and Mountfort formed a partnership in mid-1857. They co-designed the Canterbury Provincial Council Buildings in Christchurch, which were constructed between 1858 and 1865. On 6 January 1858, the foundation stone was laid by the Superintendent, William Sefton Moorhouse. After attending church at St Michael and All Angels, a procession of Police, a band, dignitaries, provincial councillors, members and officials of the government, bishop and clergy made their way along the Avon River, where Mountfort and Luck handed a ceremonial trowel to the Superintendent and helped him put the foundation stone in place. The buildings, which opened in stages, were first used for a council meeting on 29 September 1859. The Provincial Council Buildings are considered to be the finest Gothic buildings in the Southern Hemisphere, and the buildings have a Category I heritage order with Heritage New Zealand (NZHPT). Luck was the less dominant half of the partnership as credit for their joint work is generally given to the better known Mountfort.

In 1861 the duo designed the Christchurch Club which was probably New Zealand's first club. The building has a Category I heritage order with the NZHPT. He worked in partnership with Mountfort until July 1864.

=== Political career ===
Luck was elected onto the Christchurch Town Council for the period from 1863 to 1866. John Ollivier had the chairman of the Christchurch Town Council since 1863; the role was predecessor to Mayor of Christchurch. At the time, chairmen were voted by their fellow councillors. At a special meeting of the Town Council on 13 January 1865, Ollivier was elected chairman for another year. But only 10 days later, on 23 January 1865, Ollivier resigned as chairman. At the next meeting on 30 January 1865, Luck was voted chairman for the coming year, thus becoming the third person to take that role. Only a month later, Luck called a public meeting concerning the most exciting news that had ever been received in Christchurch yet, as gold had been found on the West Coast in Hokitika. At the time, the Canterbury Province covered both coasts of the South Island, and within three weeks, 2500 diggers had crossed the Waimakariri River on their overland route to the gold diggings in the western part of the province.

Luck stood for election to the fifth Canterbury Provincial Council in June 1866, and he was nominated by the then-chairman of the Town Council, Edward Bishop. There were seven contenders for the four available positions in the City of Christchurch electorate. The Press commented that the return of three of the candidates (prominent solicitor Francis James Garrick, auctioneer James George Hawkes, and lawyer Henry Wynn-Williams) was almost guaranteed, and the fourth position was the only real contest and could be expected to either go to nurseryman William Wilson (who had been representing the Kaiapoi electorate since 1864) or Luck. Wilson was some 20 votes ahead of Luck; the other unsuccessful candidates were the working-class representative Samuel Paull Andrews and Jerningham Wakefield, who had represented Christchurch Country electorate in the 1st New Zealand Parliament. Within days, Luck became a candidate in the Lincoln electorate, where two positions were available. His business partner, Charles Clark, had represented the electorate since 1862, but was unwell and did not stand again, and supported Luck's candidacy. Three candidates stood in the election, and Luck came third by a two-vote margin against Henry Tancred and Arthur Charles Knight.

=== Land holdings ===
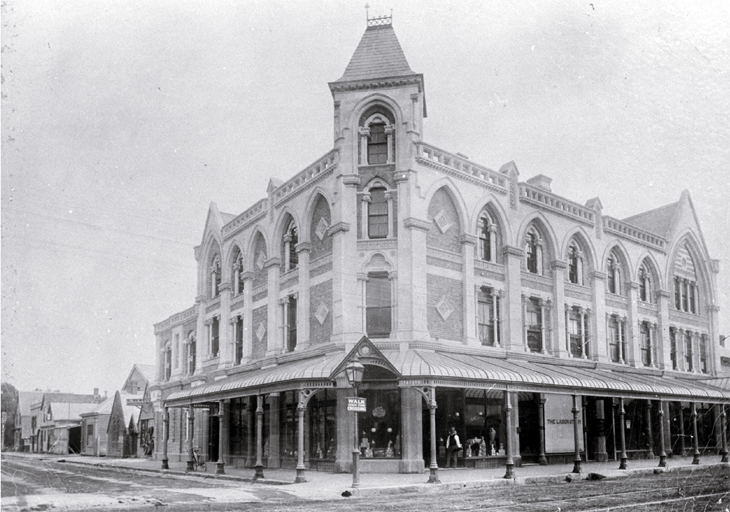
Luck's Building, designed by Benjamin Mountfort, in circa 1912

Luck owned or leased various sections in Christchurch in what is now the central city. At the time, when rural land was purchased, the buyer also obtained the right to purchase town sections.

Before he arrived in New Zealand, Luck took up 150 acres (0.61 km^{2}) of land in Heathcote in March 1851 through and with his partner Edward Kent. Rural Section 64 was located next to the Ōpāwaho / Heathcote River near where it flowed into the Avon Heathcote Estuary / Ihutai. Kent chose several town sections, including TS 705, which is the corner property fronting Colombo Street, Gloucester Street, and Cathedral Square in the north-west quadrant of the Square. TS 705 was sold to Luck, with a conveyancing date of 3 June 1853 on the title document. Luck built a house for himself on the Gloucester Street frontage. Land was subleased in 1862 on a 21-year term.

Benjamin Lancaster, an absentee landowner with family connections to the Canterbury Association, purchased RS 62, which later became known as Lancaster Park. Lancaster took up the option of also buying town sections, and he chose TS 706 and 707, with the former being adjacent to Luck's TS 705. Luck leased those sections from Lancaster from November 1853, and thus controlled most of the north-west quadrant of the Square. After the lease to Luck expired, Charles Clark purchased TS 706 in 1876.

Luck owned town sections 584 and 586 on the north-west corner of the intersection of Colombo and Gloucester Streets, which took in half the block fronting Colombo Street between Gloucester and Armagh Streets. He also owned town section 755 in Worcester Street, in the section between Manchester Street and Latimer Square.

After Luck had left New Zealand for England, a substantial building was erected on town sections 584 and 586. The Mountfort-designed building became known as Luck's Building. Most of Luck's Building was demolished in 1973 to make way for a new development, the MfL Building. Following the 2011 Christchurch earthquake, the block holding Luck's Building was designated for the new Convention Centre. In December 2012, Luck's Building was the first of the 761 central city properties to be purchased by the Canterbury Earthquake Recovery Authority.

=== Business interests ===
From July 1855, Luck had the agency for the Lyttelton Times for Christchurch and Canterbury. Luck was the chairman of the Canterbury Gas, Coal and Coke Company for some time. From November 1861, Luck was the business partner of Charles Clark and they traded as 'Luck and Clark' as land agents and auctioneers from premises on the north-west corner of the intersection of Colombo and Gloucester Streets, with Luck owning that land. Luck and Clark dissolved their partnership on 31 August 1866, Clark moved to new premises further south on Colombo Street, Luck took over the accounts receivable, and Luck carried on under the business name 'Luck and Co'. But only a few months later, the situation was reversed when Luck decided to go back to England. In March 1867, Luck advertised that any remaining debts to 'Luck and Clark' are now due to be paid to Charles Clark, and 'Clark and Co' moved back into Luck's premises on the corner of Colombo and Gloucester Street. Luck also advertised that all claims against him personally are to be presented by 3 April 1867, and he left New Zealand five days later. Clark then rented out Luck's house Meriden in Merivale.

=== Family ===
Luck had a close association to the Mountfort family beyond his business relationship with the architect. In February 1852, Luck became godfather to Wilfred Lewis Mountfort, a son of the architect. On 20 April 1853, he married Susanna Wale Mountfort (born May 1828), the architect's sister, at Holy Trinity Church.

Together with his wife and five children, he left on the Mermaid on 8 April 1867 for London.

== Retirement and death ==
Luck retired to England. From abroad, he subscribed to the ChristChurch Cathedral fund. In April 1881, he was living at 20 Westfield Park, Bristol, with his wife and three daughters, as recorded in the 1881 United Kingdom Census. He died on 15 December 1881 at his home leaving a personal estate of £2,359; his wife died in 1889 while visiting Navestock from her home in London. There is a memorial to Luck inside ChristChurch Cathedral.

== Notes ==
Political offices
Preceded by John Ollivier	Chairman of the Christchurch Town Council; 1865	Succeeded by Edward Bishop
