= 1856 Town of Christchurch by-election =

New Zealand by-election

← 1855 general	18 November 1856	1860 by-election →
Candidate	Richard Packer
Party	Independent
MP before election
Henry Sewell
Independent
Elected MP
Richard Packer
Independent

The Town of Christchurch by-election of 1856 was a by-election held in the Town of Christchurch electorate during the 2nd New Zealand Parliament, on 18 November 1856.

The by-election was caused by the resignation of incumbent MP Henry Sewell and was won by Richard Packer. Packer had been invited to stand for election in the 1855 election, but he had declined the requisition because of the popularity of Sewell, the incumbent. Sewell resigned on 16 August 1856, the final day of the first session of the 2nd New Zealand Parliament. This was in preparation of his departure for England. Sewell was a member of the first Stafford Ministry and had agreed with Stafford to remain in Auckland, where the seat of Parliament was at the time, so that Stafford could attend to business in his home town Nelson for one or two months. Sewell left at the end of October from Auckland on the William Denny for England via Sydney, i.e. he did not return to Canterbury first.

The by-election was held on Tuesday, 18 November 1856. The Lyttelton Times, one of two newspapers in Canterbury at the time, merely reported that there was a general lack of excitement about the election. The lack of reporting of the voting suggests that Packer was elected unopposed; an advertised writ would confirm whether nomination day was the same as the date recorded for the election (the two only fall on the same day if there is only one candidate), but no writ appears in the Lyttelton Times. It is likely that the writ was advertised in Joseph Brittan's Canterbury Standard, as that newspaper was printed in Christchurch.

Packer served in the 2nd New Zealand Parliament until his resignation on 28 December 1859. The resulting by-election was contested by the publican and political novice Michael Hart, and by Sewell, who had returned from England. Hart accused Packer of having been a locum tenens (i.e. a placeholder) for Sewell. This may or may not have been true, but at the very least, it could not have easily been arranged before Packer's election, as Sewell had not returned from Auckland before his return to England.
