= 1860 Town of Christchurch by-election =

New Zealand by-election

- 19 January 1860
- Turnout: 110 (68.8%)
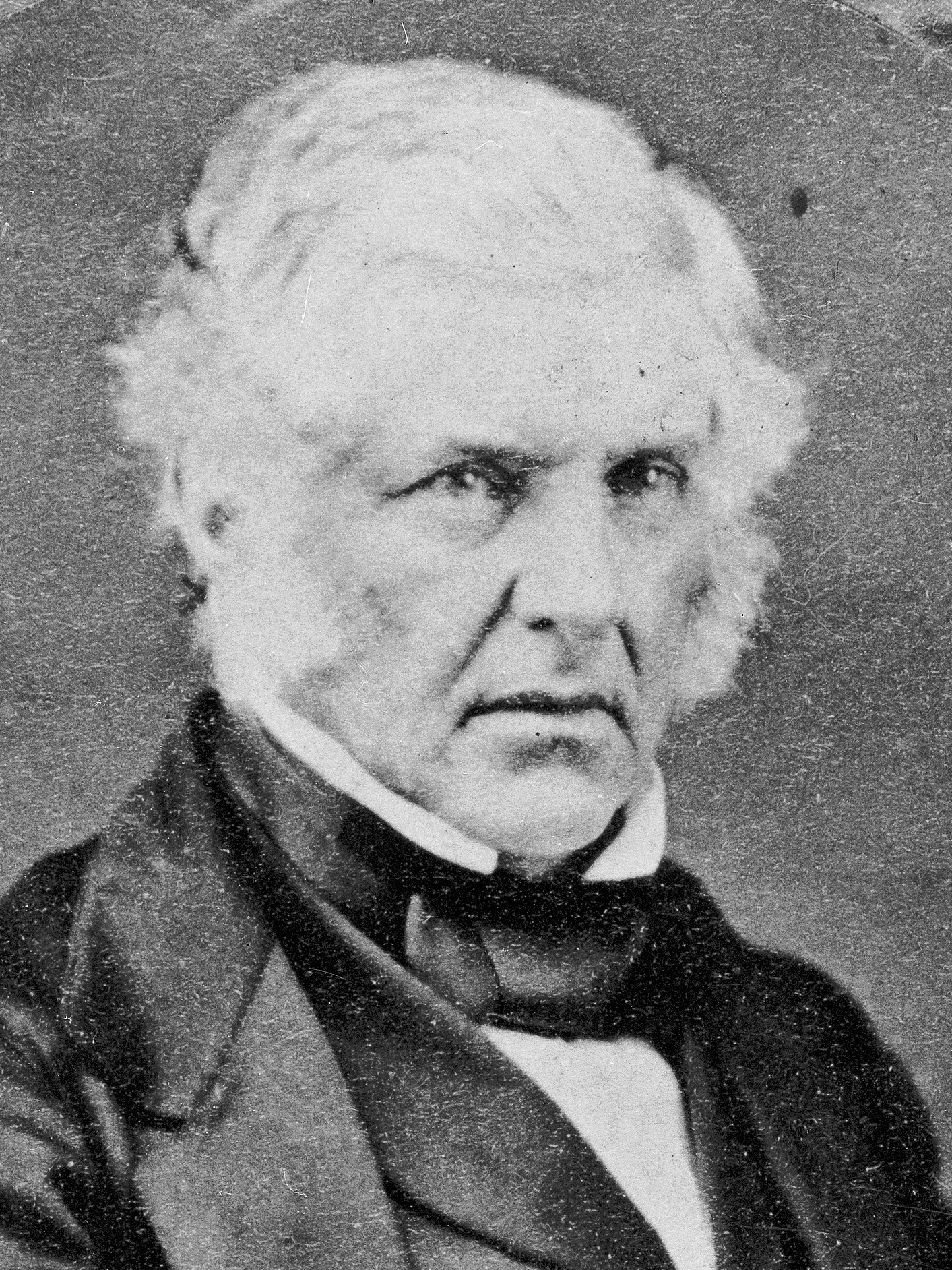

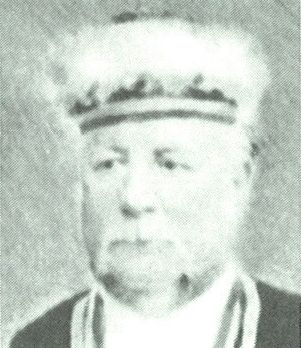
Candidate	Henry Sewell	Michael Hart
Party	Independent	Independent
Popular vote	77	33
Percentage	70.0%	30.0%
MP before election
Richard Packer
Independent
Elected MP
Henry Sewell
Independent

The Town of Christchurch by-election in 1860 was triggered by the resignation of Richard Packer as the Member of the House of Representatives for the Town of Christchurch electorate, and occurred during the term of the 2nd New Zealand Parliament. The previous representative of the electorate, the politician Henry Sewell, had returned after three years in England and the general expectation was that Sewell would be the sole contender for election. The Lyttelton Times wrote several provocative editorials, generally endorsing Sewell for his obvious ability, but criticising him for not publicly talking about his policies and plans. Sewell eventually arranged a public meeting the evening prior to nomination day; this was the only public meeting during the election campaign. After a lengthy address, which was favourably received by the Lyttelton Times, a second contender for the office put his name forward at that meeting: the publican Michael Hart. Sewell, a former premier and one of New Zealand's most senior politicians at the time, was successful against the political novice Hart.

== Background ==
=== Candidates ===
Henry Sewell had first come to New Zealand as the deputy chairman (a paid position) of the Canterbury Association in February 1853. The Association was in financial crisis and Sewell was instrumental in resolving the debt issues for Canterbury Province. In August 1853 Sewell stood in New Zealand's first general election, winning the Town of Christchurch electorate, which he represented in the 1st New Zealand Parliament. Sewell was re-elected in the 1855 election and also elected onto the Canterbury Provincial Council for the Lyttelton electorate in 1855. In May 1856, he became New Zealand's first Premier. He resigned from Parliament later in 1856 but remained an unofficial member of Parliament's executive and returned to England on ministerial duties. Sewell returned to New Zealand in early 1859 and again took up a previous role as Colonial Treasurer. By all accounts, Sewell was a senior politician.

Michael Hart arrived in Lyttelton with his wife and their two sons on the Cressy on 27 December 1850, one of the First Four Ships reaching Canterbury. Before he came out to New Zealand, he had been a plumber. Hart founded the White Hart on the corner of High and Cashel Streets, the first hotel in Christchurch. The hotel opened on 15 November 1851, less than a year after the organised settlement of Christchurch. In December 1852, Hart catered for 150 guests who had assembled to farewell John Robert Godley, the founder of Canterbury who returned to England after his short stay in the colony. A well-known man, Hart had no political experience; he was never elected onto the Canterbury Provincial Council.

=== Campaign ===
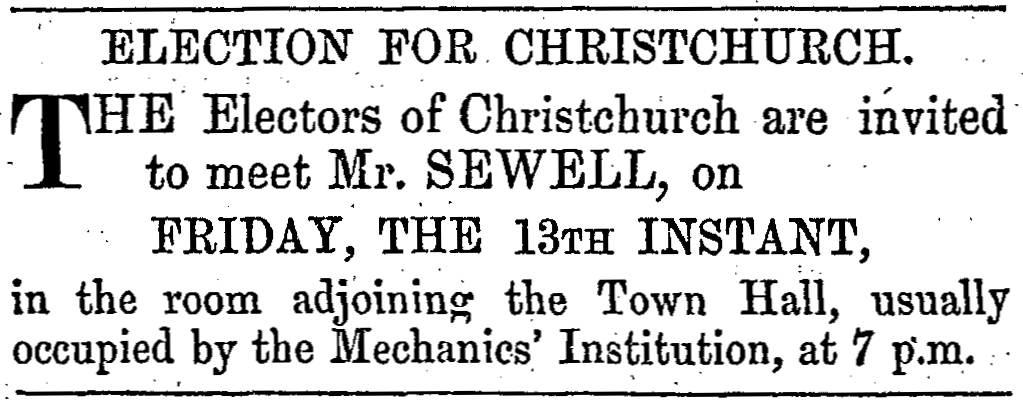
Advertisement by Sewell inviting electors to a meeting

After Sewell's resignation from Parliament in 1856, Richard Packer won the resulting 1856 by-election. Packer resigned from Parliament on 28 December 1859, triggering the 1860 by-election. The resignation was announced to the public via a statement in the Canterbury Standard, a newspaper published by Joseph Brittan. This was accompanied by a brief statement by Sewell, offering himself for election again. Hart accused Packer of having been a locum tenens (i.e. a place holder) for Sewell.

In an editorial, the Lyttelton Times welcomed Sewell's intention of representing the electorate again, but criticised him for the briefness of his statement. The newspaper's expectation was that Sewell should publicly state what his policies were, and not just rely on his past representation in Parliament. On 7 January 1860, Sewell placed an advertisement in the Lyttelton Times, inviting electors to a meeting at the Mechanics' Institute next to the Christchurch Town Hall on Friday, 13 January.

In an editorial on 11 January, the Lyttelton Times implied that Sewell's election was a foregone conclusion; no other candidates having come forward, so Sewell would simply be declared elected on nomination night. The editorial urged Sewell to address the issue of improved education when he again represented Christchurch in Parliament. On 14 January, the Lyttelton Times repeated and increased its criticism of Sewell's policies and plans being unknown to the public, and it talked of the option of rejecting Sewell. An editorial said of Sewell: "a thick impenetrable haze has hitherto enveloped his relations with the public." In 1860, the Lyttelton Times was still based in Lyttelton (the newspaper only moved to Christchurch in 1863) and was a bi-weekly. When it went to print after the meeting in the Town Hall the previous night, the editorial expressed disappointment that they could not report on the meeting called by Sewell.

This ongoing criticism caused Sewell to provide his own report to the Lyttelton Times of the meeting with electors. The editor compared this report with the one supplied by their own reporter and, containing no substantial differences, decided to print Sewell's account in the next edition on 18 January. The editorial defended the newspaper's critical stance: "We disclaim all hostile feelings against Mr. Sewell ... we have not decided to thwart but to understand him." The editor welcomed Sewell's detailed address and expressed general satisfaction with Sewell's statements. By finally addressing the electors, Sewell "removed the only objection urged against him."

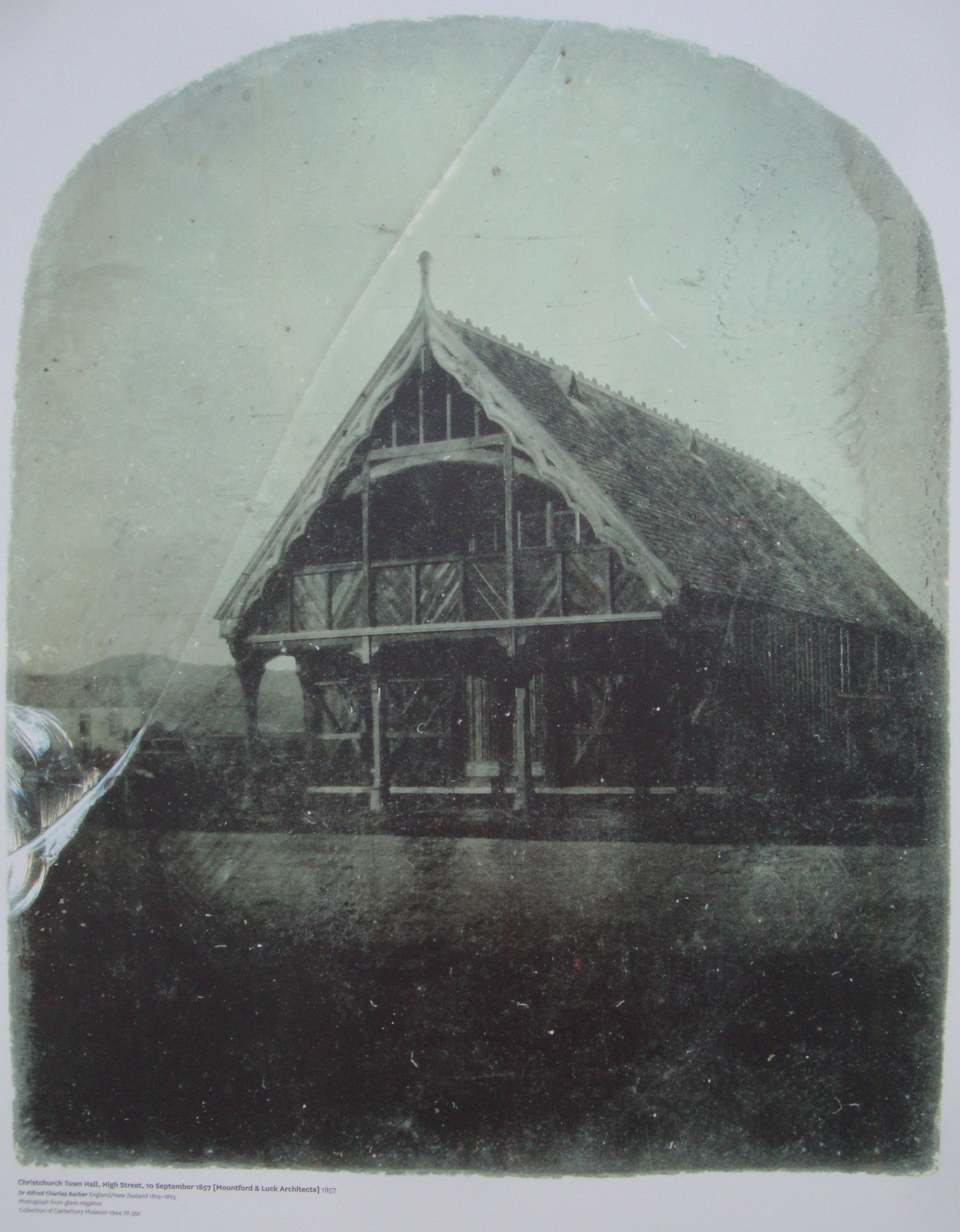
The meeting was held in a room adjoining Christchurch's (first) Town Hall in High Street

The meeting on 17 January was crowded. Many attendees were not electors, as franchise was attached to land ownership in excess of £50, or yearly rental over £10, and the resulting roll was only about 160 names long, including absentee owners in England. There had been rumours beforehand that somebody would come forward to oppose Sewell. William Thomson was elected to chair the meeting. Sewell spoke at length about various issues: that he should be elected because of the service that he had given Canterbury as their representative when in financial crisis, that he even delayed his departure to England to resolve the issues, that he had no conflict of interest with the steam ship company that provided New Zealand's postal service with England, that he did not have land holdings in the North Island more valuable than holdings in Canterbury, that he gave qualified support to the Lyttelton Rail Tunnel project and he gave his reasons for leaving the Stafford Ministry so soon after his return to the colony last year. He disagreed with Stafford's government on some issues. The two most important disagreements were land policy, where Sewell wanted the land revenue to be retained by the provincial governments, rather than the southern provinces pay a high proportion of their revenue to enable purchase of land in the north, and native policy, where Sewell predicted that the land policy being pursued would result in strong conflict with Māori; in fact, the First Taranaki War started in March 1860. As a solution, Sewell suggested the possible separation of the North Island and the South Island into separate countries; this was the first time, as far as the editor of the Lyttelton Times was aware, that such a suggestion had been made in public by a politician. The politician who is today known to have favoured separation is Julius Vogel, and he started campaigning for this idea in 1862. The Lyttelton Times argued, against the objection of many, that such an idea had merit for further consideration.

After Sewell had spoken, Michael Hart briefly addressed those present. He announced himself as a candidate and vouched his support for the Lyttelton Rail Tunnel project.

== Nomination ==
The nomination meeting was held on 18 January at the Town Hall. The returning officer, John Hall, read the writ. Richard Packer proposed Sewell as a candidate, and William Wilson seconded this. Hart was proposed by Mr Sutcliffe and seconded by Mr Rees. Both Sewell and Hart then spoke. Sewell stressed the importance of electing the right person, with reference to his experience and Hart being an unknown quantity. Hart argued that it was his right to put himself forward. Whilst Hart could not say that he received his qualifications from Oxford or Cambridge, he had obtained his "knowledge from the university of common sense". He further argued that he was as able as Packer, whom he regarded as a locum tenens for Sewell. He criticised Sewell for not residing in Christchurch.

The returning officer, John Hall, after no other candidate came forward, asked for a show of hands and declared it to be in favour of Sewell, upon which Hart demanded a poll. Hall declared that the poll be held at the Town Hall the following day (19 January), from 9 am to 4 pm.

== Results ==
110 votes were cast in the election. At the time, voting was done by the elector telling the election official his choice of candidate (the secret ballot was introduced in 1871) and as a tally was being kept by interested parties, the result was immediately known. Sewell won the election by 77 votes to 33.

1860 Town of Christchurch by-election
Party	Candidate	Votes	%	±%
Independent	Henry Sewell	77	70.0	
Independent	Michael Hart	33	30.0	
Majority		44	40.0	
Turnout		110	68.8	

Sewell served until the end of the term in November 1860. At the end of the session, he was dissatisfied with the actions of his former fellow Government ministers and did not seek re-election. Instead, he was appointed Registrar-General of Lands by Edward Stafford. In August 1861, he was appointed to the New Zealand Legislative Council so that he could become part of the 2nd Fox Ministry as Attorney-General.

== Citations ==
- McIntyre, W. David (1980). The Journal of Henry Sewell 1853–7. Vol. II. Christchurch: Whitcoulls Publishers. ISBN 0-7233-0625-7.
- Scholefield, Guy (1950) [First ed. published 1913]. New Zealand Parliamentary Record, 1840–1949 (3rd ed.). Wellington: Govt. Printer.
