= Andrew Duncan (mayor) =

New Zealand politician (1834–1880)

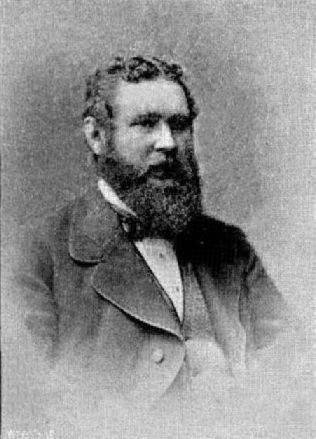
- Andrew Duncan

3rd Mayor of Christchurch
- In office 15 December 1869 – 21 December 1870
- Preceded by: John Anderson (mayor)
- Succeeded by: James Jameson

Personal details
- Born: 1834 Scotland
- Died: 10 December 1880 (aged 45–46) Christchurch, New Zealand
- Spouse: Isabella Duncan
- Profession: nurseryman

Andrew Duncan (1834 – 10 December 1880) was Mayor of Christchurch 1869–1870. From a working-class background in Scotland, he emigrated to New Zealand as a young man and became a highly respected member of the Christchurch community. He is remembered for his later work as an immigration agent in Scotland on behalf of the Canterbury Province.

== Early life ==
Duncan was born in western Scotland in 1834 to the gardener George Duncan (1791–1866) and his wife Christina. The four members of the Duncan family (the parents with Andrew and his younger sister Agnes) came out to New Zealand in 1858, arriving in Lyttelton on 21 September on the Zealandia.

== Life in New Zealand ==
Duncan recalled in 1873 that in his early days, he was "not ashamed to turn his hand to whatever employment presented itself". He ploughed, sowed and worked in road construction. He regarded the portion of the Great North Road from the Styx River to Chaneys that he had formed as "one of the best in the colony". For some time, he was employed by Christchurch's first mayor William Wilson in his nursery before he set himself up as a nurseryman and seedsman. He had shops in Gloucester Street and later in Cashel Street in the central city of Christchurch, and nurseries in Phillipstown (in Duncan's Road, named after himself, but soon renamed Nursery Road) and later in Ensors Road. He specialised in new or rare plants, and greenhouse stock.

Duncan married Isabella after he had been in Canterbury for a few years. His sister Agnes Duncan married William Boag on 17 June 1886. Boag became a wealthy man and the Christchurch suburb of Burnside is named after his residence. Agnes died on 17 September 1923, almost 20 years after Boag.

The Duncans had many children. Alexander Storie Duncan was born on 28 November 1870. Ronald O. Duncan was their sixth son and was born in Christchurch in 1875. James Robertson Duncan (d. 1914) founded the nursery Duncan and Davies in New Plymouth.

== Political career ==
=== Christchurch City Council ===
Elections for Christchurch City Council and the prior town council were held annually. He was elected four times: 1866–1868 and 1870. He was thus a councillor when the town council became the first city council, which held its first meeting on 10 June 1868.

On 15 December 1869, the city council held its annual general meeting. In those days, the councillors elected one of their group as mayor at an annual meeting, i.e. the position was not elected at large (by the voting public) as is the case today. Councillor Duncan was elected as the third mayor of Christchurch.

The councillors visited the Duncans at their home on 20 December 1870, the day before the next mayoral election. This was mainly to thank Duncan's wife Isabella for her role as mayoress and was at their place, as she had recently given birth to their son Alexander Storie Duncan (28 November 1870). At the general meeting on 21 December 1870, James Jameson was elected as the next mayor. With Duncan's term on council about to expire, he announced his intention to retire.

=== Parliamentary ambitions ===
Duncan stood for Parliament in January 1871 in the Christchurch East electorate. He was beaten by Jerningham Wakefield by 169 votes to 154. In his valedictory speech, Duncan vowed to never stand again for a seat in parliament. Indeed, when Duncan was urged by many quarters to stand for the 1875–1876 election in the City of Christchurch electorate, he declined.

=== Canterbury Provincial Council ===
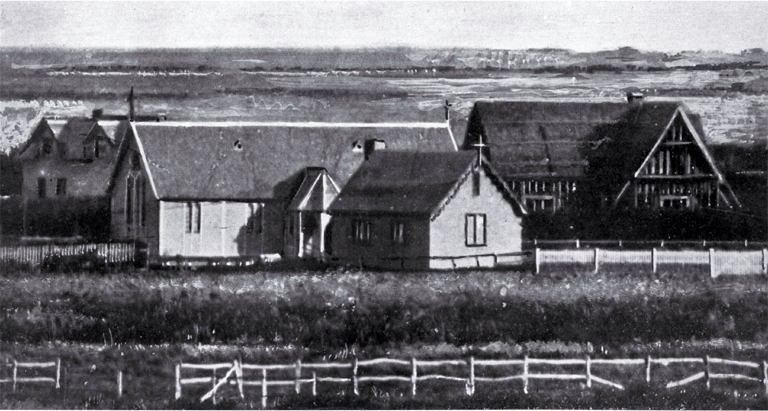
St Andrew's Church in 1858 in its original location opposite the hospital

Duncan was a member for Heathcote on the Canterbury Provincial Council for two periods. He represented the electorate on the fifth Council from January 1868 to March 1870, and again from July 1871 to August 1873 on the 6th Council. During both Councils, he was on the Executive for brief periods, in June 1869 and from April to June 1872.

Attracting immigrants to New Zealand fell within the responsibility of the central government. As the government agents were all from the North Island, the South Island provinces felt that they were missing out. The Canterbury Superintendent, William Rolleston, wrote to Premier Julius Vogel in May 1873 that his province's interests were not sufficiently looked after. The request for a Canterbury emigration agent was granted, and Duncan was asked in 1873 by the Canterbury Provincial Council to fulfil this role. He accepted and resigned in the second half of 1873, so that he could take on this post.

There was a large dinner with 125 guests held for Duncan before his departure to the 'Old Country'. His strategy was to stress the class system back home, where one depended on their feudal lord and had no real future. Children had to go to work at young age, whereas in Canterbury, they would receive an education. In New Zealand, men of the highest education would help the newcomers. With six to ten years of steady work and a sober life, one could amass fortunes unimaginable back home and get ahead in life. Duncan would use himself as an example.

He proved to be very effective in his role. In nine days, he interviewed 900 perspective emigrants and chose 190 to be sent out on the ship Canterbury, bringing 'as fine a lot of Scotch girls [as] have ever come to Canterbury ... good, robust, healthy and comely lasses, intelligent and educated'. Another of his ships, the Crusader, brought out some 376 emigrants, mainly agricultural workers. Duncan's new settlers were long regarded as of the finest quality. Duncan acted in this role for about one year.

== Public life ==
After his return from England, Duncan became involved in education. He was appointed to the Board of Education, and later chairman, and became commissioner of School reserves. In his role, he opened several district state schools.

He served on other bodies, like the Drainage Board, the Waste Lands Board, and the South Waimakariri Board of Conservation. He was a member of the Canterbury Agricultural and Pastoral Association, and chaired this organisation at the time of his death. He was a member of the Christchurch Horticultural Society, including secretary at one point. At the time of his death, he was the vice-president of the Union Rowing Club.

== Presbyterian Church ==
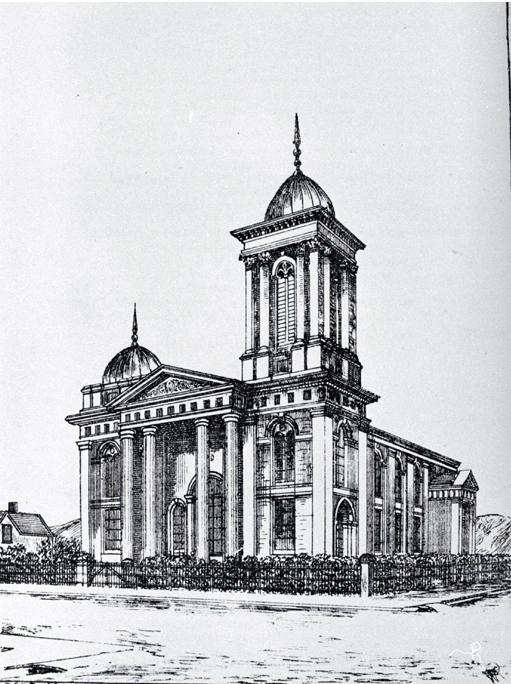
St Paul's Presbyterian Church in 1885

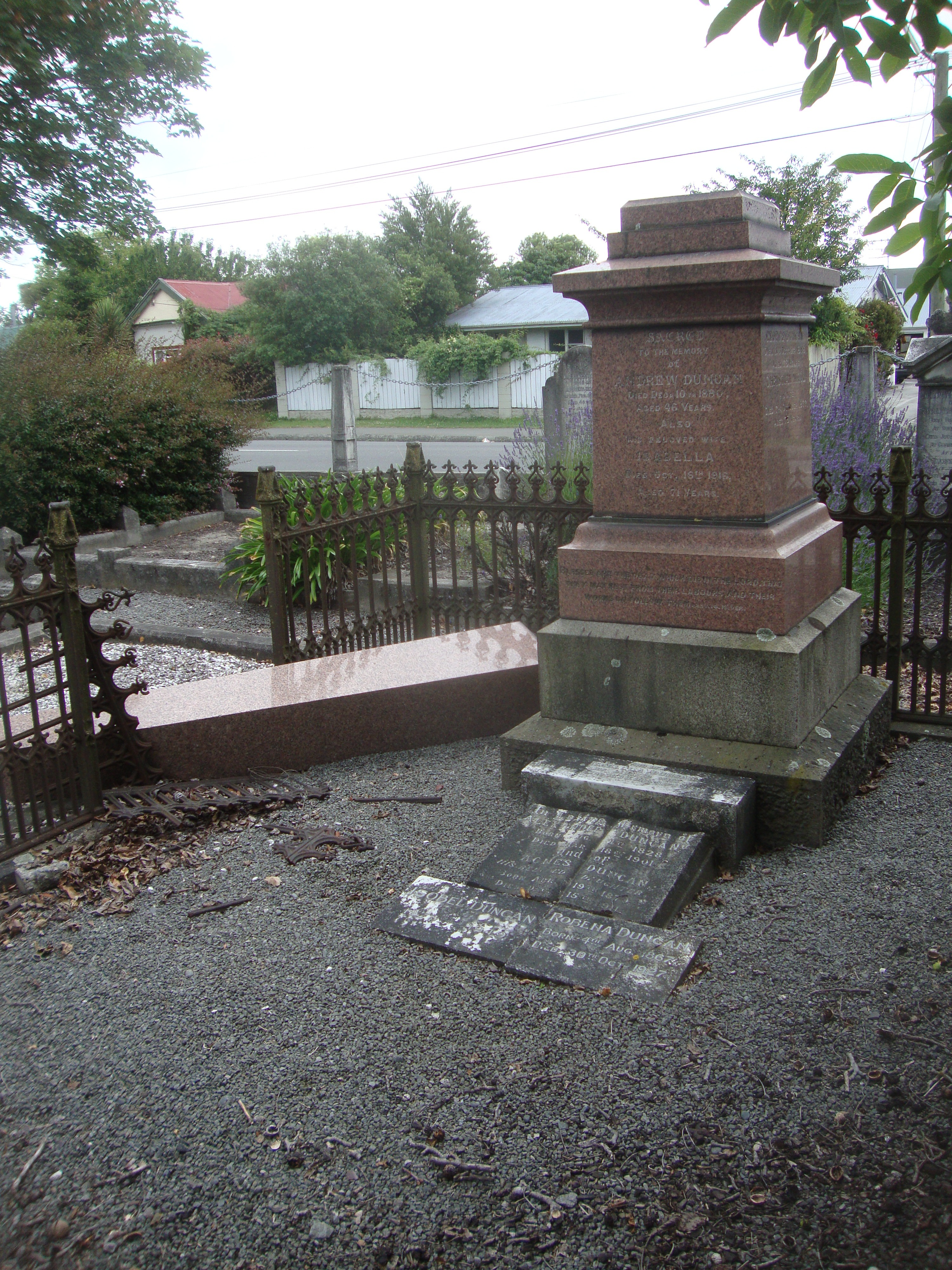
Grave of the Duncan family at the Addington Cemetery; the obelisk fell over in one of the Christchurch earthquakes

The Duncans were one of five Scottish settler families in Canterbury. Duncan was active in the Presbyterian Church. He was a follower of the first Presbyterian minister, the Rev. Charles Fraser (1823–1886), of St Andrew's Church. In 1858, Fraser established Addington Cemetery (43.54350°S 172.62360°E) in Addington as a public burial ground. It was often called the 'Scotch Cemetery' because of its links to the Presbyterian Church, but it was open to all denominations and was thus the first 'public' cemetery in Christchurch. The cemetery was eventually taken over by the Christchurch City Council. St Andrew's Church was relocated from its original site to Rangi Ruru Girls' School in 1986.

When Fraser's more liberal views clashed with those of his congregation, many of his congregation left, including the Duncans. A second congregation was formed at St Paul's Church. With two others, he travelled to Wanganui, trying and succeeding to attract Rev. Elmslie to St Paul's. John Anderson's oldest daughter, Jean, was married to Elmslie in 1881, with the reception at their house Inveresk. Anderson was Duncan's mayoral predecessor.

Although Canterbury was an Anglican settlement, the first three mayors were all Presbyterian Scotsmen—William Wilson in 1868, followed by Anderson in 1869 and Duncan in 1870.

== Death ==
Duncan, who had always been of good health, fell ill in mid-1880. What was thought of as bronchitis was diagnosed as heart disease, and his doctor recommended a trip to Australia. He travelled to Sydney, where he improved, and Melbourne, where he suffered a relapse. He came home on 18 November and never again arose from the sick bed. He died on 9 December 1880 at his residence in Ferry Road, aged 46. He was buried at Addington Cemetery on Monday, 13 December 1880, in one of the largest funeral processions that Christchurch had witnessed for some years. The Christchurch City Council adjourned their weekly meeting out of respect.

Political offices
Preceded by John Anderson	Mayor of Christchurch; 1869–1870	Succeeded by James Jameson
