= Edward Bishop (mayor) =

New Zealand politician (1811–1887)

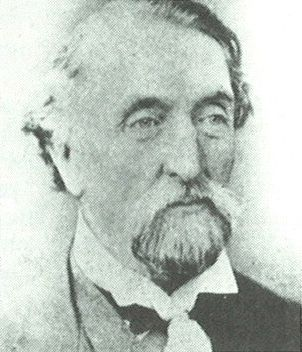
- Portrait of Edward Bishop

4th Chairman of the Christchurch Town Council
- In office 15 January 1866 – 10 January 1867
- Preceded by: Isaac Luck
- Succeeded by: William Wilson

6th Mayor of Christchurch
- In office 18 December 1872 – 17 December 1873
- Preceded by: Henry Sawtell
- Succeeded by: Michael Hart

Personal details
- Born: 1811 Maidstone, Kent, England
- Died: 25 April 1887 (aged 75–76) Cranmer Square, Christchurch Central City, New Zealand

Edward Brenchley Bishop (1811 – 25 April 1887) was the fourth chairman of the Christchurch Town Council, and seven years later the sixth Mayor of Christchurch in 1872–1873. Born in Maidstone, Kent to a wealthy family, his family lived in Belgium during his childhood. He took his father's profession as a distiller and worked in London for 21 years. His sister Susannah emigrated to New Zealand in 1849 and in the following year, many Bishop siblings followed her on the Charlotte Jane, one of the First Four Ships of organised settlement of Canterbury. With his brother Frederick, he had a large farm just south of Christchurch, and the suburb of Somerfield continues to use their farm's name. The brothers were spirit merchants in the city.

Bishop was elected onto the town and later city council eight times between 1863 and 1873. In 1866, he served as chairman of the town council during one of the most difficult years the council has ever faced. A ratepayers' revolt nearly bankrupted the council, and many staff had to be laid off, and basic services discontinued. In December 1872, he was elected by his fellow city councillors as mayor for the coming year. Bishop later acted as returning officer for some of Christchurch City Council's elections. He was involved with many organisations in Christchurch's early history, often in a leading role as chairman, secretary, or treasurer. Bishop died at his home in Cranmer Square in 1887 having never been married, and he is buried in a family grave in Barbadoes Street Cemetery.

== Early life ==
Bishop was born at Somerfield House in Maidstone, Kent, England in 1811. His parents were Argyles (born 1764) and Mary Ann Bishop (née Brenchley, 12 July 1781 – 1849). He received his early education from the curate of Sittingbourne. The family then moved to Bruges in Belgium, where he attended the Athenée Royale. He finished his education in Dunkirk in France, not far from the Belgium border. From there, he was sent to London for work and spent 21 years in employment as a distiller for Swaine and Co.

Bishop emigrated to New Zealand with most of his five siblings on the Charlotte Jane in 1850, with the ship arriving in Lyttelton Harbour on 16 December as the first of the First Four Ships of organised settlement of Canterbury. These first settlers, known as "The Pilgrims", have their names engraved on marble plaques in Cathedral Square, Christchurch, in front of the ChristChurch Cathedral. The Bishop siblings were following their sister Susannah, who had previously gone to Lyttelton with her husband.

== Siblings ==
Bishop family members on the Charlotte Jane
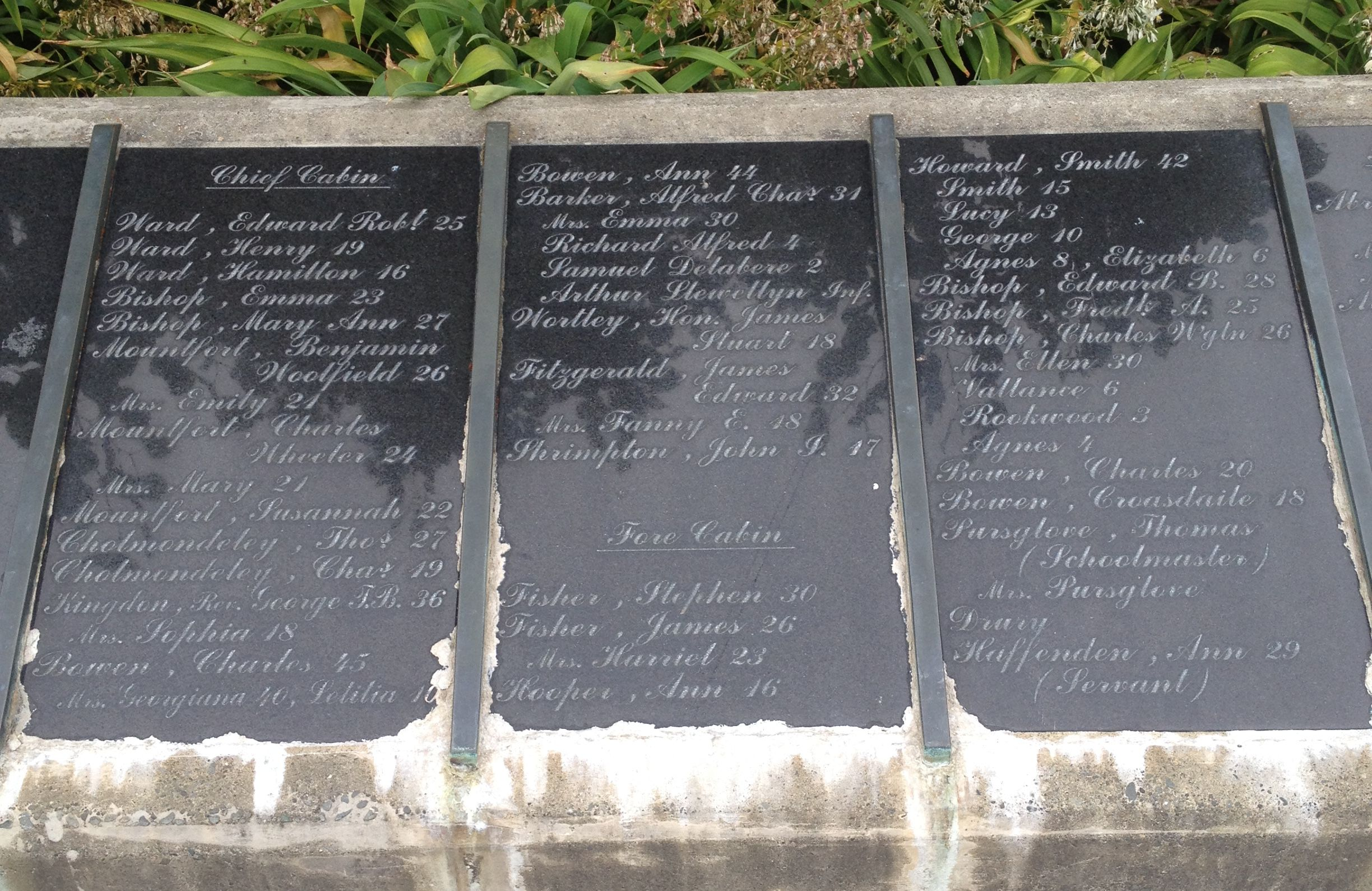
Name	relation
Edward Brenchley	subject of this article
Charles Wellington	brother
Ellen	wife of Charles
Vallance	son of Charles and Ellen
Agnes	daughter of Charles and Ellen
Rookwood Charles	son of Charles and Ellen
Frederick Augustus	brother
Emma Kate	sister
Mary Ann	sister
The nine Bishop family members who emigrated on the Charlotte Jane are inscribed on marble plaques in Cathedral Square

Most of the Bishop siblings emigrated to New Zealand on the Charlotte Jane. His oldest sister was Mary Ann (1810 – 21 August 1877), who married the veterinarian Edward Knapman on 8 December 1858 at St Michael's Church. Two of her diaries that describe their emigration journey and their early time in the colony until May 1851 are held by Christchurch City Libraries.

Bishop himself was the second oldest of the siblings. The next sibling was his sister Susannah (September 1812 – 17 October 1858), who had married Augustus James Alport (1816–1886) on 18 May 1844 at St Mary's Church, Islington, London. The Alport family with three children landed in Wellington on the Mariner on 12 July 1849. Alport sailed to Lyttelton on the Harlequin on 9 September 1849, and his family followed him two months later on the Sisters. Alport assisted Captain Joseph Thomas, the chief surveyor of the Canterbury Association, with getting Lyttelton ready for the First Four Ships. Alport established Brenchley Farm on the hillside above Lyttelton, based on the name of his wife's family estate. He was an auctioneer and organised the shipping of luggage from Lyttelton Harbour to the wharf in Heathcote. The Alports had two boys and three girls. Susannah Alport died in 1858 in Lyttelton. Brenchley Avenue in Lyttelton refers to the early farming activities of the Alports. Alport Place in the Christchurch suburb of Woolston was formed through the construction of the Woolston Cut. As the works were a flood protection measure, road names with a nautical theme were chosen, and the name refers to Alport's early shipping service. Brenchley Avenue in the Christchurch suburb of Strowan was named after a later owner of Brenchley Farm, Lyttelton mayor Samuel R. Webb, who retired there.

His third sister was Emma Kate (1814–1898).

His oldest brother was Charles Wellington (24 August 1815 – 14 August 1884). His first wife was Mariane Alport (married at Islington on 13 May 1843). They had three children before she died in mid-1849 in Bermondsey, London. He then married her sister Ellen on 13 April 1850. The children from the first marriage were Vallance (aged 6 at the time of immigration), Agnes Kate (aged 4), and Rookwood Comport (1847–1925). Charles was the first general postmaster of Christchurch, a storekeeper, a member of the inaugural Christchurch City Council, and a member of the Canterbury Provincial Council for the Christchurch Central electorate (1857–1861). When he stood for election to the House of Representatives in the Avon electorate in 1866, he was beaten by Crosbie Ward. Charles' son Valence was lost with the City of Dunedin in 1865. Charles died in 1884. When the remaining Pilgrims, as the settlers who arrived on the First Four Ships were called, gathered in Cathedral Square 50 years after their arrival in Lyttelton, Rockwood Bishop and Agnes Kate Blake were the only ones from the Bishop family who attended. Rookwood Bishop, misspelled in many sources as Rockwood, was the first mayor of the New Brighton Borough Council. Agnes had married Walter Blake in 1868.

His second brother and youngest sibling was Frederick Augustus (14 March 1818 – 16 October 1894), who married a daughter of Charles Kiver in 1859.

== Professional life ==
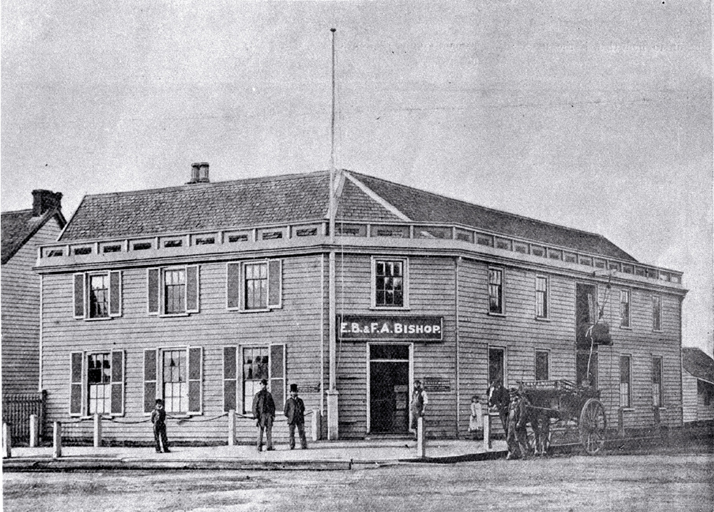
Bishop's corner, Armagh and Colombo Streets

Like his father, Bishop became a distiller and worked in that profession for 21 years.

Bishop and his brother Frederick bought land at the southern end of Colombo Street at the Ōpāwaho / Heathcote River. They called their farm Somerfield, after their birthplace, and they appear on both the 1853 jury list and electoral roll as living there. Somerfield has since been adopted for the name of the suburb in that part of Christchurch. The 42 acres (170,000 m^{2}) property was later owned by Richard Packer, who in turn passed it on to his son Henry William Packer (1831–1890).

Edward and Frederick Bishop became wine and spirit merchants in Christchurch. Their premises were on the corner of Armagh and Colombo Streets, at the Market Square, and the locality became known as Bishop's corner. Edward Bishop lobbied the government on questions of taxation of liquor.

== Political career ==
Before 1916, elections for Christchurch City Council were held annually. Bishop was elected onto the town and later city council eight times: in 1863–1866, 1869, and 1872–1873.

On 15 January 1866, in the first meeting of the year of the city council, Bishop was unanimously voted chairman for the coming year. He was the fourth chairman of the city council.

Bishop faced one of the most difficult years in Christchurch City Council's history. George Allen was a leader of several protest groups, and one such group, the Ratepayers' Mutual Protection Association, challenged the right of the Christchurch City Council to exist. Henry Wynn-Williams, a lawyer, was active with the group and took the case to court. Ratepayers started to withhold their rates, and in April 1866 the Council was forced to drastically cut expenditure in order to fend off bankruptcy. Staff were laid off, street cleaning suspended, some streets no longer lit and contracts cancelled. In May 1866, the city drainage scheme was abandoned, a project that had been estimated to cost NZ£160,000. A shipment of pipes that had just arrived from England was sold off, and Christchurch's reputation as the "most polluted and unhealthy city" in New Zealand was retained for another 20 years as a consequence. Wynn-Williams eventually lost the lengthy case and left the Ratepayers' Mutual Protection Association, which then folded. The West Coast gold rush was underway, with Christchurch losing much of its population. During 1866, the road over Arthur's Pass was completed by the Canterbury Provincial Council, which gave easier access to the West Coast.

Elections for city council members were held on 8 January 1867, and Bishop's term as councillor came to an end. He was asked to be nominated again, but he declined as being too busy, and having served four years. In the first meeting of the new city council on 10 January, one of the new councillors, William Wilson, was elected chairman.

In September 1869, Bishop stood for election as a city councillor and was successful. In the following year, he produced an abstract of the Municipal Corporations Act so that citizens could inform themselves of the workings of city councils.

Towards the end of his term as mayor, Henry Sawtell fell ill and could not fulfil his functions. Councillor Bishop filled his place during that time. The election of the next mayor was held on 18 December 1872, but The Press, the local Christchurch newspaper, already reported on 14 December of Councillor Bishop as mayor-elect. The election took place on the agreed date, and Bishop was elected unanimously. In those days, the councillors elected one of their group as mayor, i.e. the position was not elected at large (by the voting public) as is the case today. On the evening of his election, Bishop gave a banquet for 50 people at the Clarendon Hotel, with those present representing the who is who of colonial Christchurch.

At the Christchurch City Council meeting on 17 December 1873, Bishop as outgoing mayor was thanked for his service and presented by the city councillors with a gift. The councillors then proceeded to elect the next mayor from their midst. Councillor Calvert proposed Michael Hart as mayor, as he had shown administrative skill as the chairman of the works committee. Councillor Fred Hobbs seconded the motion and Hart was elected unanimously.

Whilst Christchurch City Libraries lists the 7th mayor, Michael Hart, as the one who gave the first link to the Christchurch mayoral chain, this tradition was in fact started by Henry Sawtell, who gave the first link on the day his successor, Edward Bishop, was chosen. Bishop gave the second link in April 1874, some months after he was succeeded by Hart, who was thus the third person to add a link to the mayoral chain.

Bishop's term as a city councillor expired in September 1875, when he did not stand for re-election. He had first acted as returning officer for the Christchurch City Council on special appointment by the Superintendent, William Rolleston, in September 1874. At the time, it was feared that the mayor, Michael Hart, would stop the election from going ahead, and Bishop's appointment was to counter that. After his retirement from political office, he was appointed as returning officer for further for Christchurch City Council elections; his next engagement was for the mayoral election in December 1875. The Municipal Corporations Acts Amendment Act, 1875, was passed, and this legislation stipulated that mayors had to be elected at large (i.e. by eligible voters). The incumbent, Fred Hobbs, was the only candidate nominated, so Bishop declared him elected unopposed on 17 December 1875. Bishop was succeeded as returning officer for mayoral elections in December 1876 by Leslie Lee.

== Other activities ==
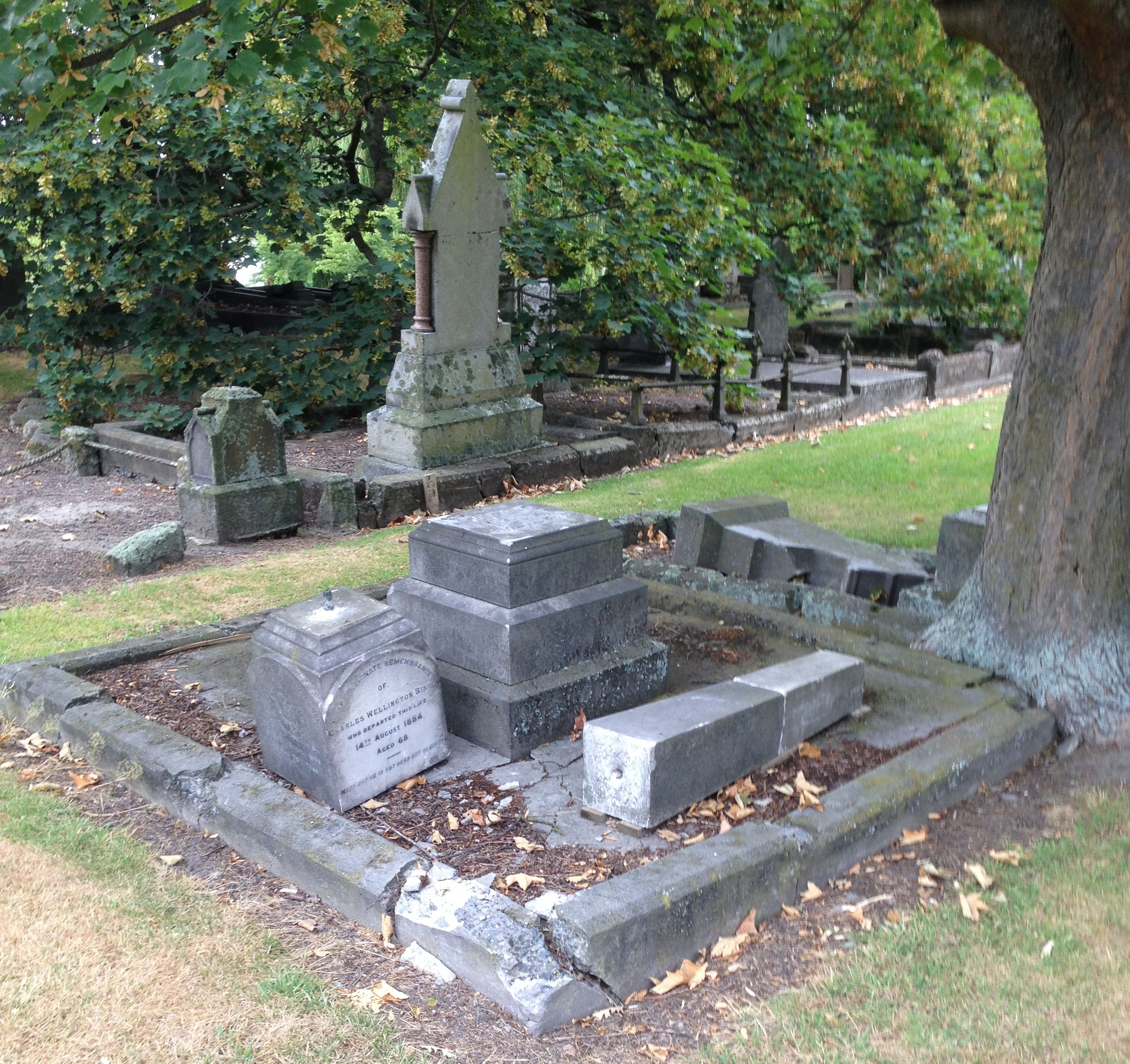
The Bishop family grave in the Barbadoes Street Cemetery was damaged in the 2011 Christchurch earthquake

Bishop was active with a large number of organisations, and for many of those, he acted as chairman, secretary, or treasurer. He was a churchwarden at St Luke's, and was on the committees of the Mechanics' Institute (which eventually developed into the Christchurch City Libraries), and the Agricultural and Pastoral Association. He was chairman of the Rifle Association. He was treasurer for the Canterbury volunteers (a private army) and donated a cup for annual competition amongst the volunteers when he was chairman of the city council. In 1868, Bishop was on the committee that lobbied for a road through Hagley Park connecting Armagh Street and Riccarton Road. He was elected Chief Fire Inspector of the Christchurch Fire Police.

After the 1869 Christchurch earthquake, he publicly questioned whether the building regulations were in need of updating.

== Death ==
Bishop died at his home at 2 Cranmer Square, Christchurch Central City, on 25 April 1887; he had no children and had never been married. He was buried at Barbadoes Street Cemetery. Three family members are buried with him: his brother Charles Wellington Bishop (died 1884), his brother's wife Ellen Elizabeth Bishop (died 1890), and his sister Emma Kate Bishop (died 1898).

== Sources ==
- The Cyclopedia of New Zealand (Canterbury Provincial District). Christchurch: Cyclopedia Company Limited. 1903.

- Mr. Edward Brenchley Bishop.
- Mr. Rookwood Comport Bishop.

- Greenaway, Richard L. N. (June 2007). "Barbadoes Street Cemetery Tour" (PDF). Christchurch City Council.
- Great Britain House of Commons (1803). Journals of the House of Commons. Vol. 91, 96. H.M. Stationery Office.
- Scholefield, Guy (1950) [First published in 1913]. New Zealand Parliamentary Record, 1840–1949 (3rd ed.). Wellington: Govt. Printer.
- Sewell, Henry (1980). W. David McIntyre (ed.). The Journal of Henry Sewell 1853–7 : Volume I. Christchurch: Whitcoulls Publishers. ISBN 0-7233-0624-9.
- Southern Provinces Almanac, 1865 (PDF). ??? and Reeves, Printers. 1865.

Political offices
Preceded by Isaac Luck	Chairman of the Christchurch Town Council; 1866	Succeeded by William Wilson
Preceded by Henry Sawtell	Mayor of Christchurch; 1872–1873	Succeeded by Michael Hart
