= James Jameson =

New Zealand politician (1824–1896)

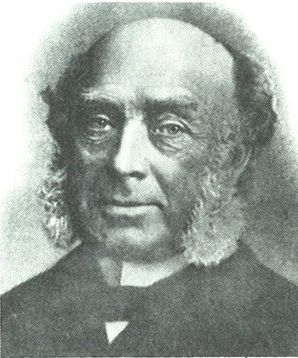
- Portrait of James Jameson

4th Mayor of Christchurch
- In office 21 Dec 1870 – 20 Dec 1871
- Preceded by: Andrew Duncan
- Succeeded by: Henry Sawtell

Personal details
- Born: 5 April 1824 London
- Died: 6 September 1896 (aged 72) Linwood
- Resting place: Linwood cemetery
- Spouse: Jane Dyer Jameson (m. 1847–1894)
- Occupation: Linen draper

James Purvis Jameson JP (5 April 1824 – 6 September 1896) was Mayor of Christchurch in 1870–1871. Originally a linen draper from the Manchester area, he emigrated with his family to Christchurch in 1863. He was involved with many organisations in Christchurch and was active in the Congregational church. For a time, he was a farmer on the Canterbury Plains.

== Early years ==
Jameson was born on 5 April 1824 in London as the fourth child to John Young Jameson and Jane Douglas Oliver. He was christened on 13 July 1824 at Saint Mary in Marylebone, London. His father was an officer HMS. Jameson had four siblings, who were also all born in London: Robert John (b. 1818), William Oliver (b. 1819), Eleanor (b. 1823) and Frederick Ogerton (b. 1828). James Jameson married Jane Dyer Waugh in 1847 at St James in Westminster. She was the daughter of James Dyer Waugh.

Jameson was a linen draper in Moston, Manchester. The 1851 and 1861 censuses show that he employed a number of people. In 1861, the Jamesons were employing seven men, six women and six apprentices. His mother was living with them at the time; she died on 15 November 1863 in Liverpool.

The Jamesons had five children, who were born before they all came to New Zealand on the Sebastopol, leaving Gravesend on 17 January 1863 and arriving in Lyttelton on 21 May 1863.

== Professional life and organisational involvement ==
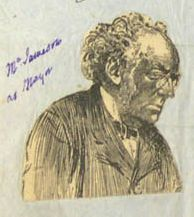
Sketch of James Jameson

Jameson set up a grocery and merchandise store in Christchurch, stocked with merchandise he brought with him from England. The store, which was located on the east side of Colombo Street, between Armagh and Gloucester Streets, was damaged in a fire on 5 November 1866. He sold this to William Radcliffe (who was later elected a member of the Christchurch City Council in 1877, and took over Warner's Hotel in Cathedral Square).

Jameson bought a farm in Leeston and moved to the Malvern District. He sold the property and bought another farm in Coalgate, but moved back to Christchurch. He lived there again during the latter part of his life, before moving back to Christchurch for his final years. His son Frederick lived in Leeston and was an auctioneer.

Jameson joined the Industrial Association of Canterbury soon after its establishment, and became its second president. In 1881, he initially refused to stand again for election as chairperson, following some controversy within the organisation over a privately proposed industrial exhibition in Dunedin. The chairmanship was eventually put to the vote and Jameson was narrowly re-elected.

Together with John Ollivier, he acted as a judge at Agricultural and Pastoral Association shows.

Jameson promoted the establishment of the original Kaiapoi Woollen Company. He was a director of the Mutual Benefit Building Society for many years, and chaired several public bodies. He was the chairman of the Christchurch Public Cemetery Board until his death and was succeeded in this role by Charles Louisson.

He belonged to the Trinity Congregational Church and was a member of the committee in charge of fundraising for the original church built in 1864. Following his death, a memorial service was held at the church.

== Politics ==
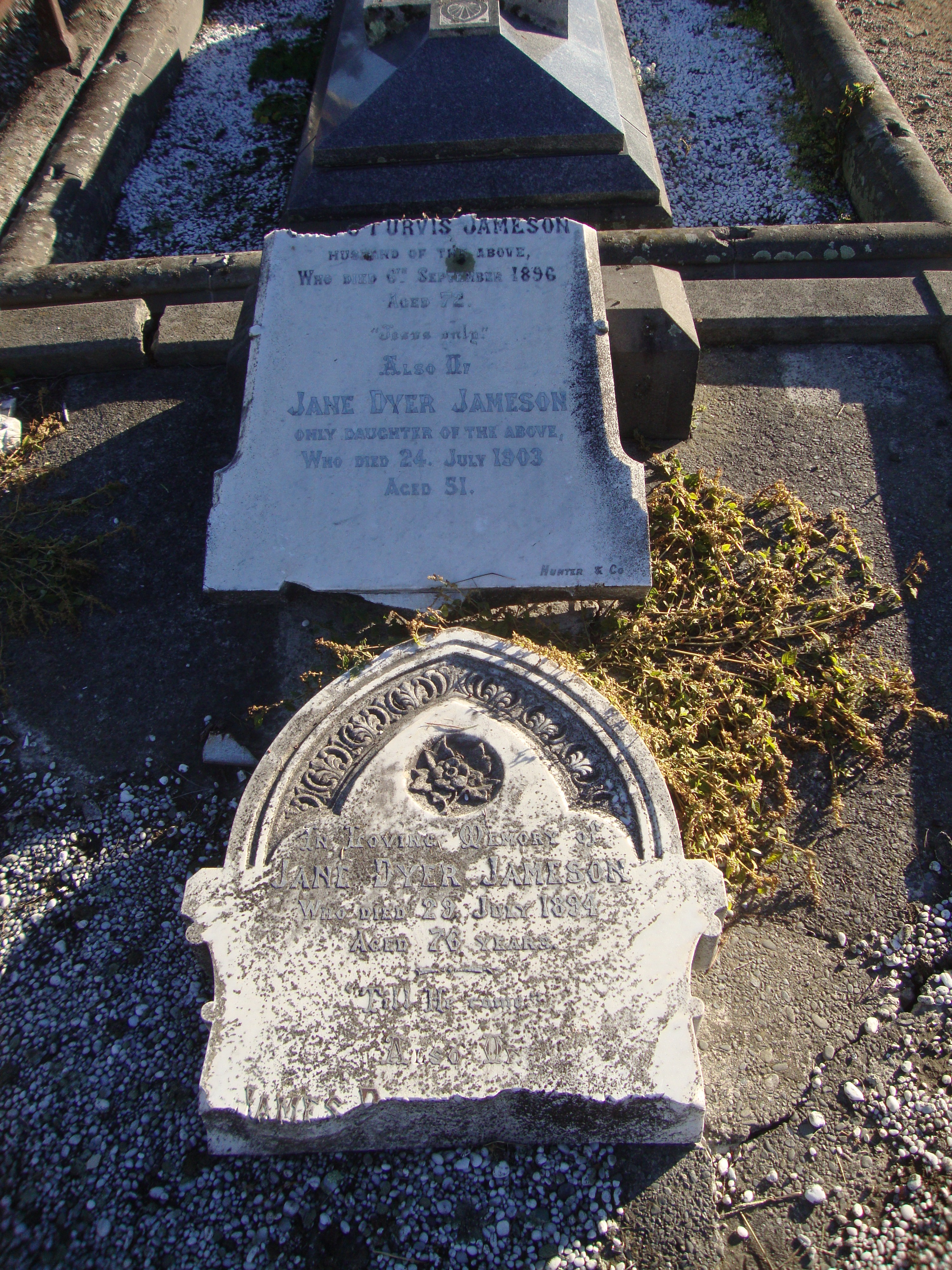
The headstone of James Jameson and his wife at Linwood Cemetery

The Christchurch town council held a meeting on 10 June 1868 to elect its first mayor. In those days, the councillors elected one of their group as mayor, i.e. the position was not elected at large (by the voting public) as is the case today. The following councillors attended the meeting: William Wilson, James Purvis Jameson, T. Tombs, George Ruddenklau, Henry Thomson, W. A. Sheppard, William Calvert and John Anderson, who chaired the meeting. Thomson moved that Wilson be elected as the first mayor of Christchurch, and Tombs seconded the motion. The chairman put the motion to the meeting and it was carried unanimously. With the meeting, the council had brought itself under the Municipal Corporations Act 1867.

Elections for the town council and since 1868 Christchurch City Council were held annually. He was elected five times: 1867, 1868, 1870, 1871 and 1878.

Jameson was elected mayor at a council meeting on 21 December 1870. In April 1871, Christchurch hosted the Governor, George Bowen, and Jameson received him on behalf of the City Council. Later in the same month, the council caused considerable controversy through the illegal process of setting rates. On 20 December 1871, Henry Sawtell was elected to be the next mayor of Christchurch.

On 3 October 1890, he unsuccessfully contested the Heathcote riding of the Selwyn County Council against Walter Kitson.

== Family ==
They had five children:

- James Samuel (1847/48 – 3 August 1888), his eldest son, married Mary Thomson, the eldest daughter of James Thomson, Brighton, Victoria, on 4 May 1883.
- William (27 June 1849 – 27 August 1923) married Mary Haswell Wood on 27 January 1878 at Trinity Church in Christchurch.
- George (born December 1850) married Agnes MacFarlane, and his second marriage was with Vera Target.
- Jane Dyer (1852 – 24 July 1903) died in Christchurch.
- Frederick (1856 – 23 July 1908) married Jane Emeline (Linnie) Worker, daughter of the Rev.W. Worker, of Sanson on 19 October 1881.

His wife Jane Dyer Jameson died on 29 July 1894 at their Cashel Street residence in Linwood. The funeral was two days later, and she was buried at the Linwood Cemetery.

Jameson died on 6 September 1896, also at his Linwood residence. He was buried at Linwood Cemetery two days later. He was survived by three sons and one daughter. Failing health had prevented him from participation in public life in his last few years.

Jameson Avenue in the Christchurch suburb of Mairehau is named for him.

Political offices
Preceded by Andrew Duncan	Mayor of Christchurch; 1870–1871	Succeeded by Henry Sawtell
