= Richard Packer (politician) =

New Zealand politician

Member of the New Zealand Parliament for Town of Christchurch
- In office 1856–1859
- Preceded by: Henry Sewell
- Succeeded by: Henry Sewell

Canterbury Provincial Council
- In office 1853–1860
- Preceded by: new office

Personal details
- Born: 1794
- Died: 27 July 1872 (aged 77–78) Christchurch
- Spouse: Hannah

Richard Packer (1794 – 27 July 1872) was a New Zealand politician and Member of Parliament from 1856–1859 representing the Town of Christchurch electorate. He was also a member of the Canterbury Provincial Council, including its treasurer.

== Early life ==
Packer lived in Claverton near Bath in the County of Somerset, England, when he decided to emigrate to New Zealand, which he did in 1851. He took up employment as church steward. His family arrived in Lyttelton on 31 May 1851 on the ship Travancore.

== Political career ==
New Zealand Parliament
Years	Term	Electorate	Party
1856–1859	2nd	Town of Christchurch	Independent

Packer was elected to the first Canterbury Provincial Council in 1853, together with Samuel Bealey and Thomas Cass. He was a member of the 1st and 2nd council, from 1853 until 1860. During a day of low attendance in October 1854, he secured a suspension of the standing orders, which allowed him to pass the first two readings of a bill to enlarge the council's membership by 12 additional members. Whilst there was justification for such a measure due to the long session lengths, the Executive Council consisting of Henry Tancred, Henry Godfrey Gouland, Charles Simeon, and William John Warburton Hamilton regarded the matter as a vote of no confidence and resigned. Packer was part of the Executive Council in 1855 and again in 1857. For a time, he was Provincial Treasurer and Provincial Secretary.

Henry Sewell vacated his seat for the Town of Christchurch electorate on 21 October 1856 to commence overseas travel. Packer was elected on 18 November in the 1856 Town of Christchurch by-election to fill this vacancy.

On 28 December 1859, Packer resigned his seat at parliament. The 18 January 1860 by-election was won by Sewell, who had returned from overseas.

He served on the Waste Lands Board until his death.

== Later life ==
Packer had an early shop in Cashel Street on the site that was later occupied by the Bank of Australasia.

Packer owned 42 acres (170,000 m^{2}) of land at the southern end of Colombo Street. The property was previously owned by the brothers Edward and Frederick Augustus Bishop, and they had called it Somerfield based on their birthplace (Somerfield House in Maidstone, Kent). Packer's son, Henry William Packer (1831–1890), increased the family's land holding to 132 acres (0.53 km^{2}). Somerfield has since been adopted for the name of the suburb in that part of Christchurch.

Packer was active in the Anglo-Catholic movement in the Anglican church. He was on the building committee for the Saint Michael and All Angels Church, which these days forms part of the St Michael's Church School in the Christchurch Central City. His name is written on parchment stored in a glass cylinder underneath the cornerstone in the foundation.

Packer died in Christchurch on 27 July 1872. Packer's wife Hannah died on 7 December 1879 in the Christchurch suburb of Somerfield, aged 85.

== Notes ==
New Zealand Parliament
Preceded by Henry Sewell	Member of Parliament for Christchurch; 1856–1859	Succeeded by Henry Sewell
