= Isabella Williams (businesswoman) =

New Zealand businesswoman

Isabella Williams (née Brough; 1806 – 8 August 1882) was a New Zealand businesswoman. She established and managed a drapery store in Christchurch, New Zealand, in the late nineteenth century.

== Biography ==
Williams was born in Perthshire, Scotland, probably in 1806, as she was baptised at Errol on 25 January 1807. Her mother was Mary Valentine and her father, Charles Brough, was a labourer.

When she was 25 years old, she married John Williams, a baker and confectioner. In 1850 the couple, with their two sons and five daughters, emigrated to New Zealand on the Randolph, one of the First Four Ships of settlers to sail from England to Lyttelton, New Zealand. The ship arrived on 16 December 1850, and a few days later the Williams decided that John would make the journey over the Port Hills to the new settlement of Christchurch to view their town section alone while Isabella and the children stayed in the immigration barracks in Lyttelton. John Williams had a horrible heart attack while walking up the hills and died.

The Anglican reverend Edward Puckle opened a subscription fund to raise money for Williams, and the very wealthy Deans brothers, who were also settlers from Scotland, invited her to stay at their property in Riccarton. Williams initially sold her husband's baking supplies, such as yeast, as well as more supplies sent over by her family to sell to fellow settlers, and then in 1852 opened a drapery business in Colombo Street opposite Market Place (now Victoria Square). She imported goods from Scotland and called the business Glasgow House. Williams retired in 1871 and sold the business as a going concern. It eventually became part of a department store, T.J. Armstrong's.

Williams died on 8 August 1882 and was buried at Barbadoes Street Cemetery.
