= Vashti Sawtelle =

American physics educator

Vashti A. Sawtelle is an American scholar of physics education focusing on learning environments, equity and diversity, and student retention in physics. She is an associate professor of physics and astronomy in Lyman Briggs College at Michigan State University, and co-director of the Physics Education Research Lab at Michigan State.

== Education and career ==
Sawtelle majored in physics at Grinnell College, graduating in 2006. At Grinnell, she received the Jeanne Burkle Award, given annually "to a graduating student who, in academic and co-curricular activities, has advanced the cause of women and gender equality". She received a Ph.D. in physics education from Florida International University, in 2011. Her doctoral dissertation, A Gender Study Investigating Physics Self-Efficacy, was supervised by Eric Brewe.

After postdoctoral research at the University of Maryland, she joined Michigan State University as an assistant professor of physics in 2014. She was tenured as an associate professor in 2020.

== Recognition ==
In 2022, Sawtelle was named Michigan Distinguished Professor of the Year by the Michigan Association of State Universities. She was named as a Fellow of the American Physical Society (APS) in 2024, after a nomination from the APS Topical Group on Physics Education Research, "for foundational research on self-efficacy, introductory physics for life sciences, and community college student persistence; for broadening participation and promoting engagement among all physics students; and for enduring contributions to the rigorous use of qualitative methods".
