= Henry Sawtell =

New Zealand politician

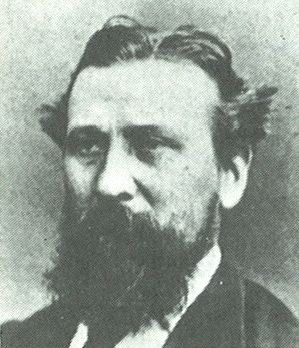
- Portrait of Henry Sawtell

5th Mayor of Christchurch
- In office 20 December 1871 – 18 December 1872
- Preceded by: James Jameson
- Succeeded by: Edward Bishop

Personal details
- Born: 1832 Langport, Somerset, England
- Died: 19 June 1913 (aged 80–81) Christchurch, New Zealand

Henry Sawtell (1832 – 19 June 1913) was Mayor of Christchurch 1871–1872.

== Early life ==
Sawtell was born near Langport in Somerset, England in 1832. His parents were Mary and Thomas Sawtell. He came to Nelson, New Zealand on the John Masterman in February 1857. In August 1858, Sawtell came to Lyttelton. In 1861, he lived on town section 200 in Lyttelton.

On 14 June 1862 at the Trinity Church in Lyttelton, he married Mary Ann, the daughter of Thomas Abrahams of Lyttelton. Their first son, Leonard Sefton Sawtell, was born on 11 March 1863 when they were living in Lyttelton's Oxford Street. By 1864, they were living in Christchurch's Hereford Street. His wife died in 1879, and on 20 January 1880 at St John's Church, Christchurch, he married Maria Parnham.

== Professional life ==
Initially, Sawtell was a grocer in Christchurch, working for Dalgety. For some time he was in partnership with Alexander Cracroft Wilson, son of John Cracroft Wilson, and the firm carried on business as general merchants in High Street under the name of Wilson, Sawtell and Co.

== Political career ==
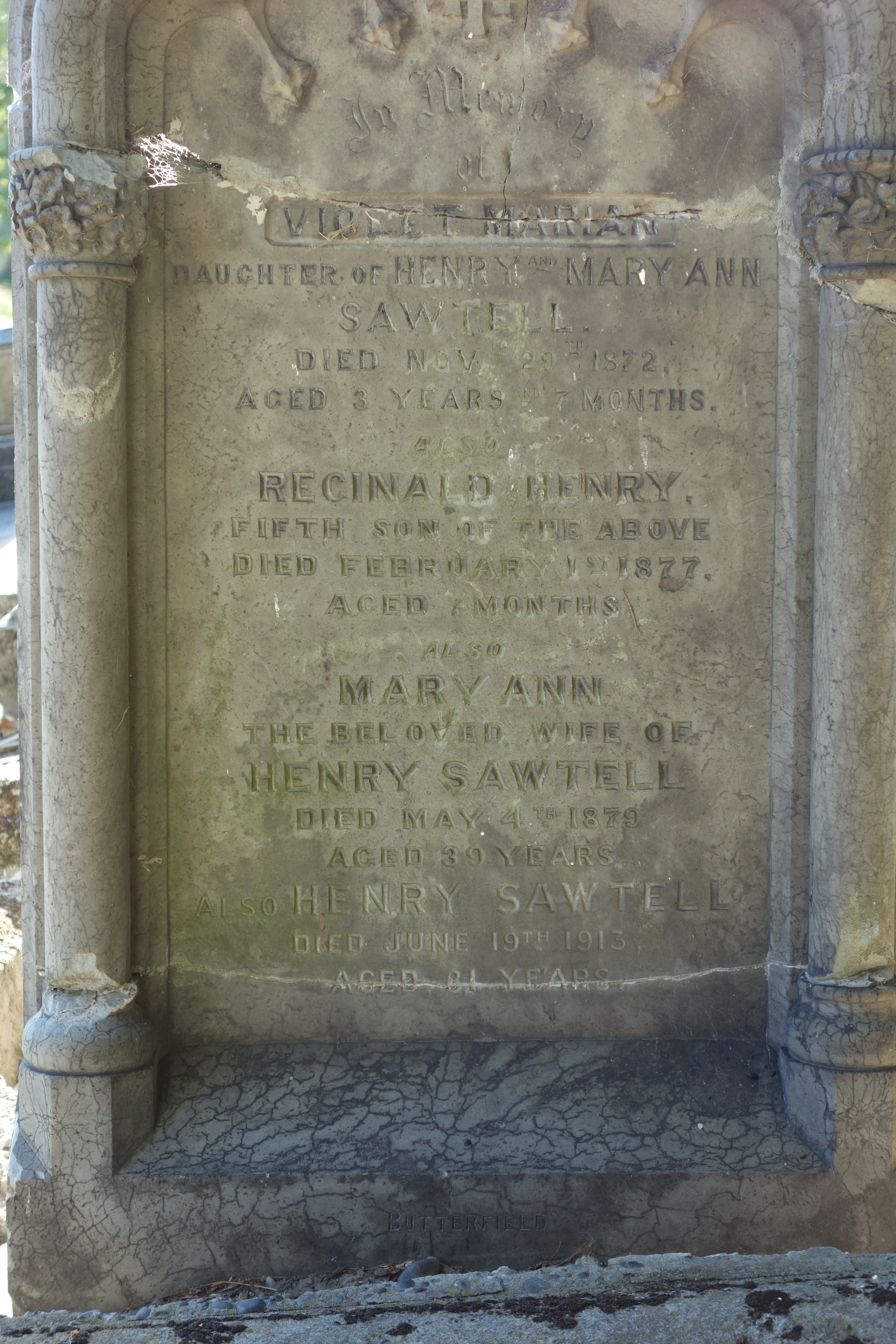
Grave stone for Sawtell, his first wife, and two of their children

=== Christchurch City Council ===
Before 1916, elections for Christchurch City Council were held annually. Sawtell was elected onto the town and later city council three times: in 1868, 1871 and 1872. In those days, the councillors elected one of their group as mayor, i.e. the position was not elected at large (by the voting public) as is the case today. On 20 December 1871, Sawtell was elected to be the next mayor of Christchurch, succeeding James Jameson.

Towards the end of his term as mayor, Sawtell fell ill and could not fulfil his functions. Councillor Edward Bishop filled his place during that time. The election of the next mayor was held on 18 December 1872, but The Press, the local Christchurch newspaper, already reported on 14 December of Councillor Bishop as mayor-elect. The election took place on the agreed date, and Bishop was elected unanimously. Sawtell resigned as a city councillor during February 1873 due to ill health.

Whilst Christchurch City Libraries lists the 7th mayor, Michael Hart, as the one who gave the first link to the Christchurch mayoral chain, this tradition was in fact started by Sawtell, who gave the first link on the day his successor was chosen. Edward Bishop gave the second link in April 1874, some months after he was succeeded by Hart, who was thus the third person to add a link to the mayoral chain.

=== Canterbury Provincial Council ===
Sawtell was a member of the 6th Canterbury Provincial Council for the City of Christchurch electorate from 6 May 1870 until the end of the term on 28 February 1874, when he did not stand for re-election.

== Family ==
His son Claude Sawtell married the artist Rosa Budden. Henry Sawtell was buried at Barbadoes Street Cemetery.

Political offices
Preceded by James Jameson	Mayor of Christchurch; 1871–1872	Succeeded by Edward Bishop
