= Alice Sawtelle =

American classicist and poet (1863–1909)

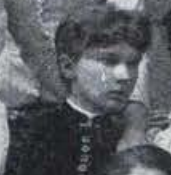
Alice Elizabeth Sawtelle Randall at Colby College, 1885

Alice Elizabeth Sawtelle Randall (1863–1909) was an American classicist and poet. Her two most notable works include her dissertation, "The Sources of Spenser's Classical Mythology", and her poem, "The Vision of St. Elizabeth". She graduated from Colby College in 1888 as a member of its Sigma Kappa chapter, and earned her doctorate in philosophy from Yale University in 1896.

== Scholarship and poetry ==
Sawtelle's most famous writing is "The Sources of Spenser's Classical Mythology", a dissertation on Edmund Spenser. In it, she praises Spenser's mastery of classical mythology and his ability to create 'new' myths that blend seamlessly with the actual tales of antiquity. She continues on to alphabetically lists out and explains how Spenser uses different classical myths in his work. This dictionary approach earned her some contemporary reproach; fellow scholars complained that her lack of conclusion relegated her work to mere data collection and not true scholarship. Others defended her work, claiming that both her rigor and the work's utility to other scholars was merit-worthy.

Her dissertation continued to be used by a number of papers on Spenser after Sawtelle's death in 1909. Later scholars praise "The Sources of Spenser's Classical Mythology" as a "pioneer work" and being highly readable despite its dictionary format. In 1932, Henry Gibbons Lotspeich attempted to expand upon Sawtelle's work with his own catalogue, "Classical Mythology in the Poetry of Edmund Spenser".

Her poem, "The Visions of St. Elizabeth", received much less scholarly attention. The poem is religious, celebrating St. Elizabeth's charity towards the poor and sick. It was published in The Biblical World in 1897.

== Education and feminism ==
Sawtelle was one of only 48 American women to receive a doctorate in English in the 19th Century. She graduated from Colby College in 1888, just 17 years after the university began accepting women. While there, she and eighteen other women penned and signed a letter protesting attempts by Colby's administration to separate the female student body from the male. Additionally, she joined Colby's Sigma Kappa chapter.
