= E. Rosa Sawtell =

New Zealand painter (1865–1940)

- Born: Elizabeth Rosa Budden; 6 September 1865; Christchurch, New Zealand
- Died: 20 September 1940 (aged 75); Christchurch, New Zealand
- Education: Canterbury School of Art (now Ilam School of Fine Arts)
- Known for: Painting
- Notable work: On the Outskirts of Barton's Bush, Heretaunga; Reminiscences; The Clay Road
- Spouse: Claude Ernest White Sawtell (m. 1894; died 1917)
- Elected: Society for Imperial Culture
- Relatives: Henry Sawtell (father-in-law)

Elizabeth Rosa Sawtell (née Budden, 6 September 1865 – 20 September 1940) was a New Zealand painter.

== Career ==
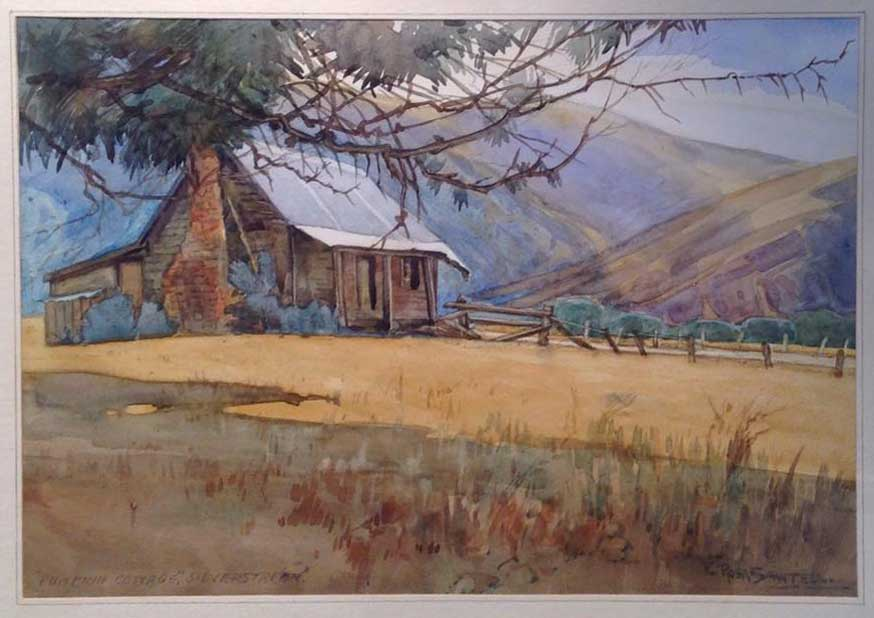
Pumpkin Cottage, by Elizabeth Rosa Sawtell

Sawtell worked in watercolours and pencil drawings. Her works were primarily landscapes (often plein-air studies) and portraits.

In 1881, she was one of the foundation students at the Canterbury School of Art and exhibited with the Centre of Contemporary Art between 1882 and 1893 (under the name E. Rosa Budden). She received a silver medal by the Society in 1888 for 'landscape study from nature'.

From 1894, she became known under the name E. Rosa Sawtell, exhibiting with the Auckland Society of Arts, New Zealand Academy of Fine Arts, and Otago Art Society.

Sawtell was a member of The Group, an informal art association from Christchurch, New Zealand, formed to provide a freer alternative to the Canterbury Society of Arts. She contributed works to exhibitions in 1935, 1936, and 1947 (posthumously).

Works by Sawtell were included in the London British Empire Exhibition (1924) and the New Zealand and South Seas Exhibition, taking place in Dunedin, 1925–1926 (as Mrs Claude Sawtell).

During the 1890s, Sawtell was a prominent member of the Palette Club, a Christchurch-based group that promoted plein-air painting among local artists.

In the 1920s, Sawtell was the secretary for the Society for Imperial Culture.

Notable works include On the Outskirts of Barton's Bush, Heretaunga, Reminiscences, and The Clay Road.

== Personal information ==
Known primarily under her married name, E. Rosa Budden changed her surname to Sawtell after marrying Claude Sawtell on 9 January 1894 at Sumner. Her father-in-law was Henry Sawtell, a former mayor of Christchurch (1871–1872). Her husband died in 1917, aged 54. Rosa Sawtell died at her home in the Christchurch suburb of Merivale on 20 September 1940, aged 75, after a long illness. The Sawtells are buried at Linwood Cemetery.
