= William Wilson (mayor) =

New Zealand politician (1819–1897)

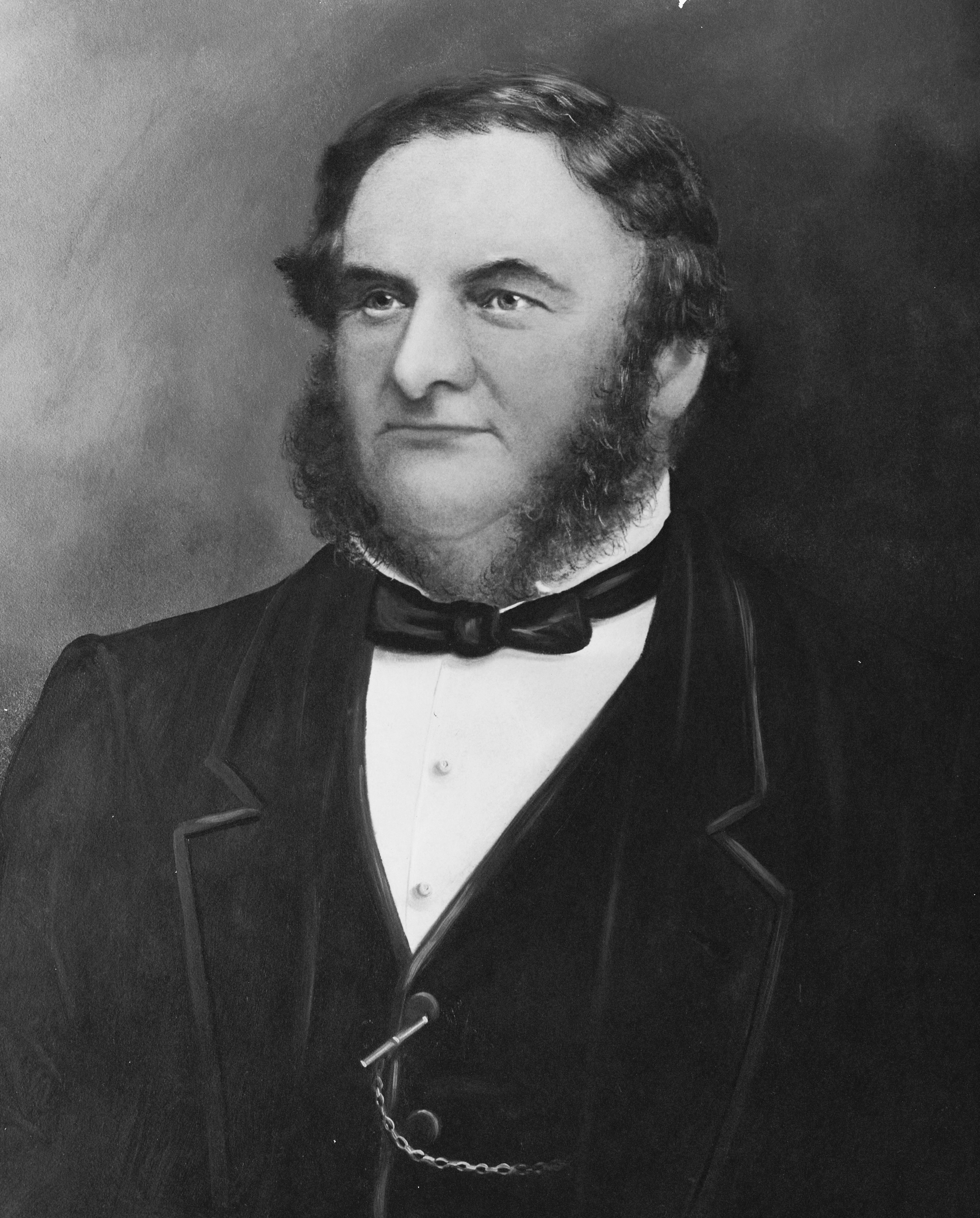
- Painting of William "Cabbage" Wilson (probably 1867)

1st Mayor of Christchurch
- In office 10 Jun 1868 – 16 Dec 1868
- Succeeded by: John Anderson

Personal details
- Born: 2 April 1819 Castle Douglas, Scotland
- Died: 8 November 1897 (aged 78) Christchurch, New Zealand
- Resting place: Linwood Cemetery; 43.5385°S 172.6863°E
- Spouse: Elizabeth (née Williams)
- Profession: Nurseryman, businessman

William Barbour Wilson (2 April 1819 – 8 November 1897), also known as Cabbage Wilson, was the first Mayor of Christchurch in New Zealand in 1868. A nurseryman by profession, he had large landholdings in Christchurch. His reputation was dented by a fraud conviction, and when he was subsequently elected onto the city council once more, five councillors resigned in protest.

== Early life ==
Wilson was born in Castle Douglas in Kirkcudbrightshire, Scotland. He was the eldest child of Jane Thomson and her husband, William Wilson. He arrived in New Zealand in August 1850 at Port Chalmers on the ship Mariner, and travelled to Nelson, Wellington and Auckland before arriving in Lyttelton in late July 1851. The Mariner left London on 7 April 1850 and arrived at Port Chalmers on 6 August 1850.

He married Elizabeth Williams on 19 November 1856; she was 20 at the time of their wedding, 17 years his junior. His wife was the daughter of John and Isabella Williams, who arrived in Lyttelton with their seven children in December 1850 on one of the First Four Ships, the Randolph. John Williams was found dead four days after arrival, having possibly died from heat exhaustion. Her mother Isabella worked as a draper and had a shop on Colombo Street, Christchurch. The Wilsons had 13 or 14 children, and Isabella Williams would later testify that he began beating her by the time she was pregnant the second time: "He beat me black and blue." Their oldest son was William John (born ca. 1856), and their second son was Charles James.

== Professional life ==
In Scotland, Wilson was an apprentice as a nurseryman and worked as an overseer on estates.

His first nursery in New Zealand, Bricks Farm, was next to The Bricks 43.52540°S 172.64510°E, a locality on the Avon River in central Christchurch. Wilson lived at The Bricks for his first five years in Christchurch. Next, he owned the block of land bounded by Cashel, Madras, Lichfield and Manchester streets; this was later known as Bedford Row and is its name to the present day. He bought up land in sought after areas for his nurseries and then operated them until the land became too valuable, and he subdivided it for development. At its maximum, he held 18 acres in the central city. He specialised in shelter plants and hedges and became the dominant nurseryman in Christchurch. He was one of the first in New Zealand to publish product catalogues. He later held land in the suburb of Waltham. Apart from his extensive landholdings, he had a general trading company, a real estate and auctioneering business, a controlling stake in the Halswell quarries (purchased in 1876), and a half partnership in the trading vessel Rifleman.

In 1876 Wilson was accused of fraud and as it was usual in those days, the court proceedings of well-known people were reported in fine detail in the newspapers. He lost the case on all counts and this brought to an end Wilson's public life, with him resigning from his various roles.

== Political career ==
Wilson had an active political life. He was a member of the Canterbury Provincial Council on the 4th Council from June 1864 to May 1866, representing the Kaiapoi electorate despite being a Christchurch resident. He then represented the City of Christchurch electorate on the 5th Council from June 1866 to March 1870.

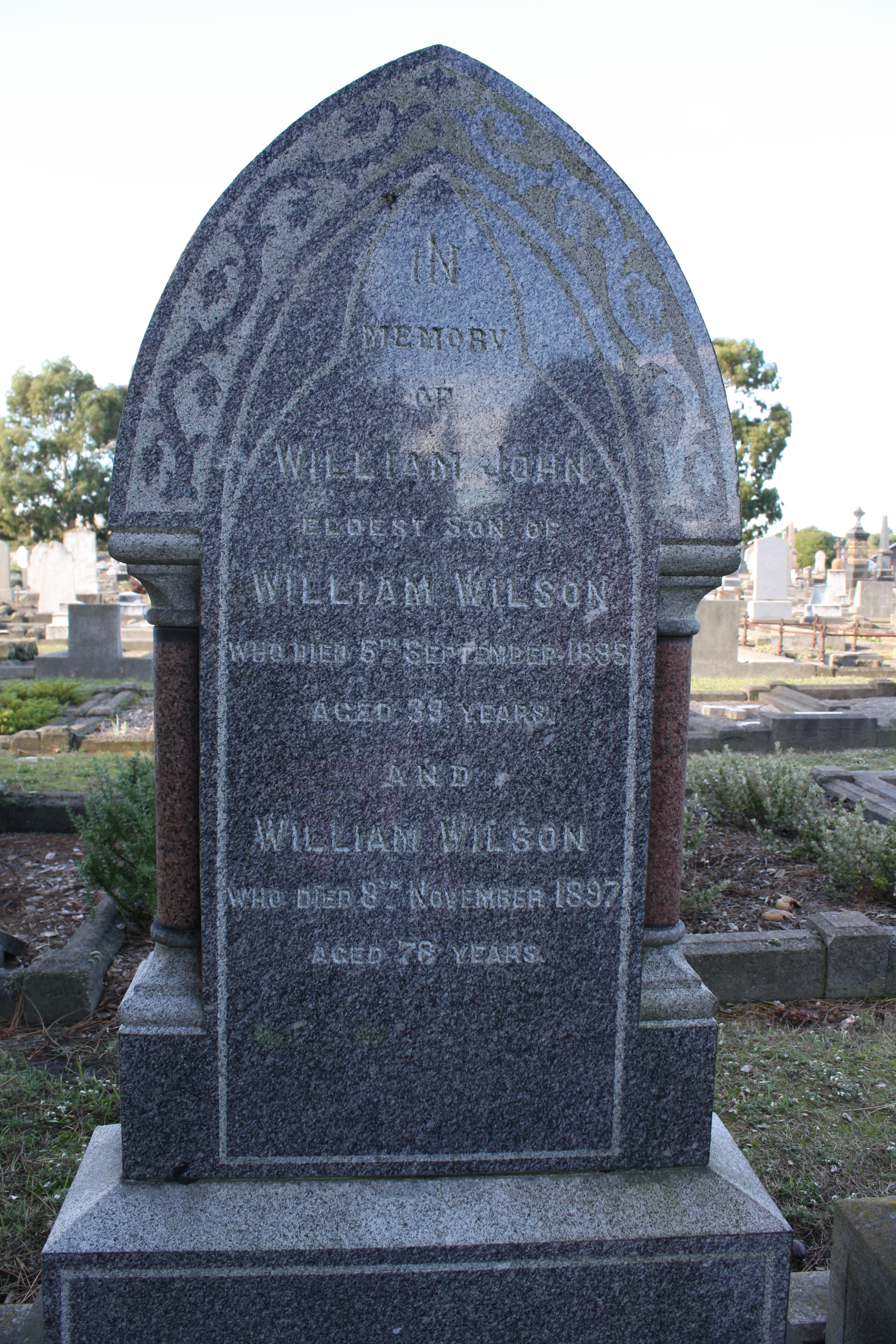
Headstone for Wilson and his son William John in the Linwood cemetery

Before 1916, elections for Christchurch City Council were held annually. He was elected onto the town and later city council four times: in 1862, 1867, 1868 and 1878. In 1867, he was nominated for a position on the city council by a current city councillor, the publican George Ruddenklau. In the subsequent council meeting, it was again Ruddenklau who nominated (or seconded; sources differ) Wilson as chairman of the town council, and he was declared elected without other nominations being put forward. The town council held a meeting on 10 June 1868 to elect its first mayor. In those days, the councillors elected one of their group as mayor, i.e. the position was not elected at large (by the voting public) as is the case today. The following councillors attended the meeting: William Wilson, James Purvis Jameson, T. Tombs, George Ruddenklau, Henry Thomson, W. A. Sheppard, W. Calvert and John Anderson, who chaired the meeting. Thomson moved that Wilson be elected as the first mayor of Christchurch, and Tombs seconded the motion. The chairman put the motion to the meeting and it was carried unanimously. With the meeting, the council had brought itself under the Municipal Corporations Act 1867.

On 16 December 1868, the town council held its annual general meeting. Councillor Anderson was elected unanimously as the second mayor of Christchurch. Although Canterbury was an Anglican settlement, the first three mayors were all Presbyterian Scotsmen; Wilson in 1868, followed by John Anderson in 1869 and Andrew Duncan in 1870.

Wilson stood for election to the city council once more in 1878, i.e. after his fraud conviction. At the candidates' meeting, Wilson argued with the current mayor, Henry Thomson, who acted as chairperson at the meeting, about the order of proceedings. Three positions were available contested by eight candidates, and James Gapes, Wilson, and Aaron Ayers were returned. Over the next day, five of the existing councillors handed in their resignation in protest over Wilson's election: William Pratt, William Radcliffe, George Ruddenklau, James Jameson, and Alexander William Bickerton. Radcliffe tried to withdraw his resignation, but this was not accepted by the mayor. Five new councillors were elected in a by-election the next month. Councillors were elected for one year at the time, and Wilson retired at the September 1879 election, when he did not stand again.

== Private life and death ==
Wilson was involved with several clubs and societies. For many years, he chaired the Christchurch Horticultural Society. He was the first president of the Christchurch Poultry, Bantam & Pigeon Club. He was responsible for the construction of the first Town Hall in Christchurch's High Street.

After he split from his wife, he tried to break into her house, but was stopped by Dr John Frankish, his brother-in-law. Wilson was arrested soon afterwards.

Isabella Williams died in 1882. Wilson died on 8 November 1897. He was buried at Linwood Cemetery.

== Notes ==
Political offices
Preceded by Edward Bishop	Chairman of the Christchurch Town Council; 1867	Office of Mayor of Christchurch established
First	Mayor of Christchurch; 1868	Succeeded by John Anderson
