= Hulbert (surname) =

Hulbert is a surname. Notable people with the surname include:

- Ann Hulbert (born 1965), American tennis player
- Archer Butler Hulbert (1873–1933), American historical geographer
- Barry Hulbert (born 1951), Australian rugby league footballer
- Calvin Butler Hulbert (1827–1917), American college president
- Cat Hulbert (1950–2022), American professional gambler
- Charles Hulbert (writer) (1778–1857), English businessman and writer
- Charles Augustus Hulbert (1804–1888), English clergyman
- Charles Hulbert (mayor) (1841–1926), Mayor of Christchurch, New Zealand
- Claude Hulbert (1900–1964), British comic actor
- Duane Hulbert, American pianist
- Emily Hulbert (born 1995), Australian footballer
- George Murray Hulbert (1881–1950), American politician and judge
- Henry L. Hulbert (1867–1918), U.S. Marine, Medal of Honor recipient
- Homer Hulbert (1863–1949), American activist for Korean independence
- Jack Hulbert (1892–1978), British comic actor
- John Hulbert (disambiguation), various people
- Lloyd Hulbert (1918–1986), American biologist
- Mark Hulbert (born 1955), American finance analyst
- Mike Hulbert (born 1958), American golfer
- Norman Hulbert (1903–1972), British politician
- Robin Hulbert (born 1980), British football player
- Sam Hulbert (1936–2016), American scientist and academic administrator
- Thelma Hulbert (1913–1995), English painter
- William Davenport Hulbert (1868–1913), American naturalist
- William Hulbert (1832–1882), American baseball administrator
