= Charles Hulbert =

Charles Hulbert may refer to:

- Charles Hulbert (writer) (1778–1857), English businessman and writer
- Charles Hulbert (mayor) (1841–1926), mayor of Christchurch
- Charles Augustus Hulbert (1804–1888), English clergyman
