= Hulbert =

Hulbert may refer to:

== People ==
- Hulbert (surname)

=== Given name ===
- Hulbert Aldrich (1907–1995), American banker and businessman
- Hulbert Footner (1879–1944), Canadian crime fiction writer
- Hulbert Taft (1877–1959), American journalist and publisher
- Hulbert Harrington Warner (1842–1923), American businessman and philanthropist

== Places ==
=== Australia ===
- Hulbert, Queensland, a town

=== United States ===
- Hulbert, Oklahoma
- Hulbert Township, Michigan
  - Hulbert, Michigan, an unincorporated community

== Other uses ==
- USS Hulbert, a destroyer of the United States Navy
- 34738 Hulbert, a minor planet
