= Hamish Hay Bridge =

Bridge in Christchurch, New Zealand

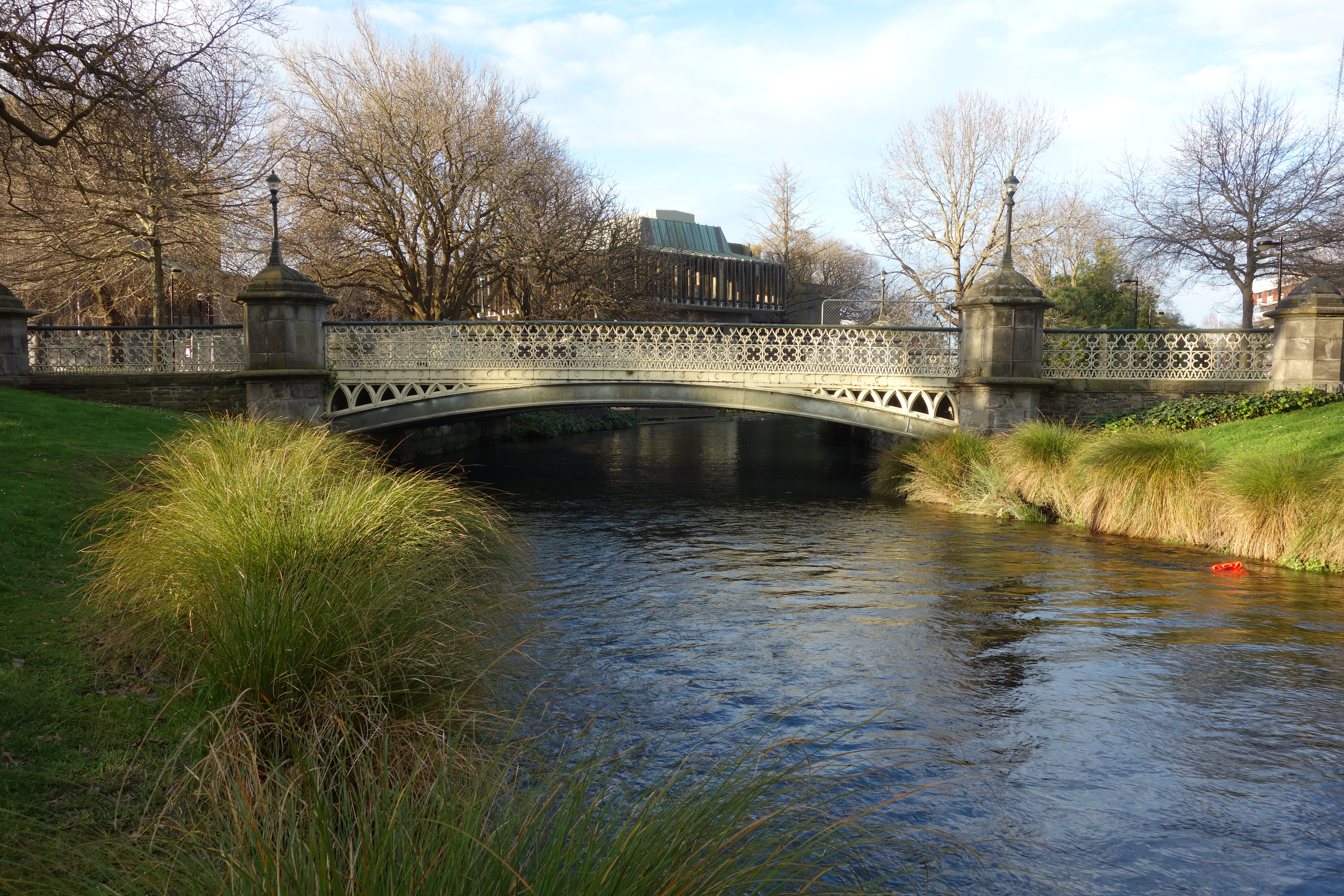
- The bridge in 2013
- Coordinates: 43.527778°S 172.635278°E
- Carries: pedestrians, cyclists
- Crosses: Avon River
- Locale: Victoria Square, Christchurch, New Zealand
- Other names: Victoria Street Bridge; Victoria Bridge; Papanui Bridge; Market Place Bridge

Characteristics
- Design: cast iron girders
- Material: Steel, concrete deck
- Width: 20.1 m
- No. of spans: 1

History
- Designer: Charles Fox (London); James Wylde (Christchurch)
- Constructed by: Edward George Wright
- Opened: 28 September 1864

Statistics
- Daily traffic: none

Heritage New Zealand – Category 2
- Designated: 2 April 2004
- Reference no.: 1832

Location
- Interactive map of Hamish Hay Bridge

Hamish Hay Bridge (also known as Victoria Street Bridge; previously Victoria Bridge and initially variably Papanui Bridge and Market Place Bridge) is a bridge located in Victoria Square, Christchurch, New Zealand. Built in 1864, it was renamed in 1989 for Sir Hamish Hay, Mayor of Christchurch; a commemorative bronze plaque is affixed to the bridge's guard rail in the middle of the structure to honor Hay's services. The bridge, the oldest heritage feature in the square, is also the country's oldest cast iron and stone bridge. It survived the 2011 earthquake undamaged. Architectural features include the bridge arch and the balustrade's neo-gothic ornamentation. The bridge is registered as a Category II heritage structure with the New Zealand Historic Places Trust.

== Location ==
Christchurch was surveyed in 1850 with a regular grid layout, interrupted by the Avon River and two diagonal roads making connections to the port in Lyttelton and to the northern hinterland. The northern diagonal crosses the Avon in an area that was set aside as a market square. A simple bridge was built to cross the river in March 1852 in the location of the current bridge. The road that the bridge served was originally called Whately Road, named after the Archbishop of Dublin, Richard Whately, who was a member of the Canterbury Association. The road name changed the Victoria Street, and the name of the market square changed to Victoria Square.

== History ==
=== First bridge (1852) ===
After settlement of Christchurch having started in December 1850, the Society of Land Purchasers under the chairmanship of Guise Brittan arranged for a first bridge to be erected in the market square, and this was done in March 1852. The bridge gave access from Christchurch to the 36 hectares (89 acres) Papanui Bush, some 6.5 kilometres (4.0 mi) away and at the time the end of the road. Papanui Bush was one of only two forests on the Canterbury Plains and thus an important source of building material and firewood; the bridge thus became known as the Papanui Bridge. In 1852, the price of firewood in Christchurch was 21s to 24s depending on quality, but only 7s in Papanui Bush, with the balance the cost of carting, which demonstrates the importance of making transport easier. The bridge was also referred to as the Market Place Bridge, as it was the centrally located in the square that was initially known as Market Place.

=== Second bridge (1856) ===
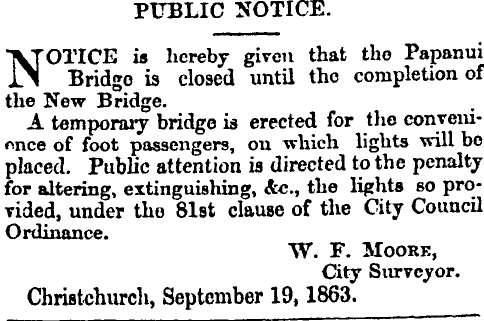
Advertisement advising of the closure of the bridge in September 1863

This first single-lane cart bridge was replaced by a structure 16 feet (4.9 m) wide in February 1856. Construction took 13 days, during which it was closed for traffic, was supervised by the Provincial Engineer, Edward Dobson, and cost £294. By 1857, Papanui Bush was exhausted and timber had to be carted from much further away, and carts with 16 to 20 bullocks regularly crossed the bridge. A one-day traffic count from January 1862 shows the following survey results:

Count	type	notes
10	bullock drays	58 bullocks
51	horse drays	66 horses
36	horse carts	51 horses
1	donkey cart	1 donkey
199	saddle horses	
20	cows and bullocks	
204	sheep	
1000	pedestrians	

In March 1862, the Christchurch Town Council was set up, but the bridge initially remained under the control of the Canterbury Provincial Council due to its strategic importance. The Provincial Council decided in 1862 to replace the bridge, and originally budgeted £2,000 to do so. This was increased by a further £1,000 before construction started.

In August 1863, it was resolved for lights to be installed by the Christchurch Town Council on the Colombo and Papanui bridges, so that pedestrians could find their way to the safe crossing points at night. But before this happened, the Provincial Secretary wrote to the town council on 18 September 1863, requesting that Papanui Bridge be closed for all cart traffic until such time that a new bridge can be constructed. The City Surveyor duly advertised the closure the next day, also advising of a temporary footbridge to be constructed to which the light would be fitted.

=== Present bridge (1864) ===
The provincial government contracted Sir Charles Fox in London to design a more substantial bridge. Fox and Henderson Co. was also charged with tendering the work, and the commission for wrought iron girders went to Head Ashby of Stockton-on-Tees at a cost of £605. A delay was caused by the girders being found to be deficient, and they had to be recast before shipping to New Zealand.

Meanwhile, the local bridge design was undertaken by the Assistant Provincial Engineer, James Wylde, and the site works awarded to Edward George Wright, whose winning tender was £2,375. Wright began his work in January 1864, whilst the iron girders did not arrive in Lyttelton until July of that year. However, the journey by sea had been rough, and shifting cargo had caused three of the girders to crack. This was repaired at John Anderson's foundry at a cost of over £300; Anderson had wrought iron plates riveted over the cracks. Wright constructed solid square stone blocks for the girders to terminate in, and the bridge was built at a width of 27 feet 6 inches (8.38 m). It opened on 28 September 1864 with considerable ceremony, with four guards placed at the bridge the previous evening so that nobody would cross it prior to the opening ceremony. The honour of opening the bridge fell to John Ollivier as chairman of the Christchurch Town Council, and Dr William Donald as resident magistrate of Lyttelton. Ollivier broke a bottle of champagne on the bridge to declare it open, and it fell to Donald to officially name it Victoria Bridge. The new bridge was heavily criticised by one of the local newspapers, The Press, for being of a much more complex and expensive construction type than would have been necessary, yet they questioned whether the abutments would even withhold the lateral forces induced by the reasonably flat girders. The total cost of the bridge was reported to the Town Council as £3,410 10s. At the same time, ownership of the bridge was transferred from the Provincial Council to the Town Council. The Provincial Council allocated a further £300 to the project, and thus paid £3,300 towards the total costs.

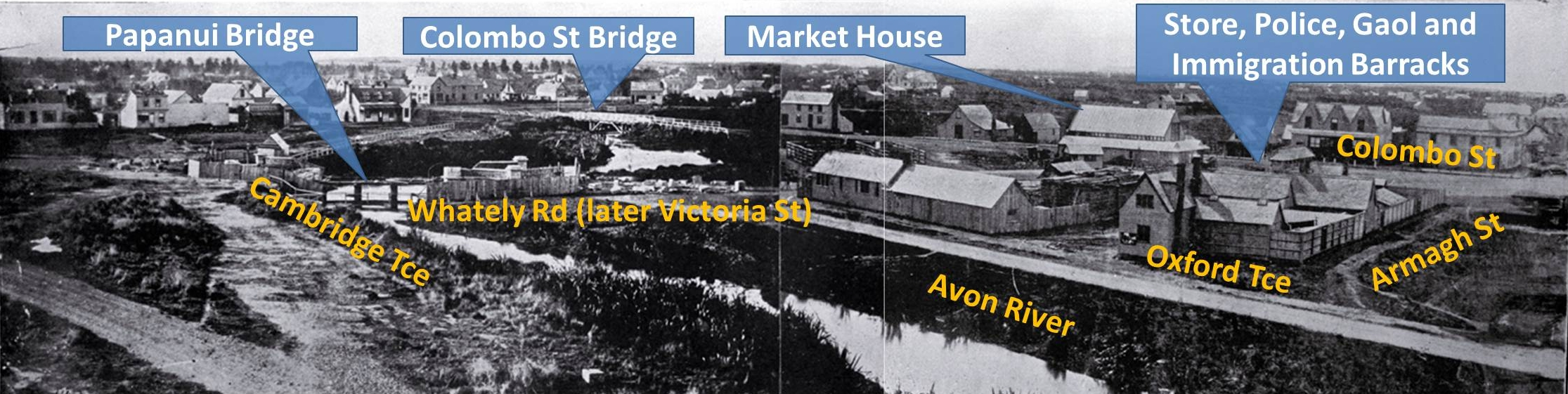
Market Place in 1864 during the construction of the Papanui Bridge

The Canterbury foothills were hit by a severe rainstorm on 3 February 1868, and the Waimakariri River broke its banks between Courtenay and Halkett (near Kirwee), entering the headwater of the Avon River at Avonhead. The flood water reached Christchurch at 10 am of the following day and rose rapidly and that evening, the city was under water. In Dr Barker's house, located on the corner of Worcester Street and Oxford Terrace and thus only some 400 metres (1,300 ft) upstream from the Victoria Bridge, the water was 3 feet (0.91 m) deep. The Worcester Street Bridge was washed downstream by a distance of 150 yards (140 m), and the north end of the Colombo Street Bridge was swept away. The Gloucester Street suspension footbridge and the much more substantial Victoria Bridge survived the flood without damage, and the Madras Street and Stanmore Road bridges further downstream were also undamaged.

The bridge was widened in 1875 to a design by Samuel A'Court. Wing piers were added and outrigger wooden footpaths were added. The wing piers are documented on a commemorative plaque, but the description is technically incorrect, as the piers are not load-bearing structural elements. In October 1877, George Gould presented a petition to the city council to have Whately Road renamed to Victoria Street, which was acceded to.

Steam trams started their regular service to St Albans along Whately and Papanui Roads on 5 June 1880, and by August the line had been extended to reach its terminus at the Papanui railway station.

In 1885, only ten years after the last occasion, the bridge was widened again, this time to its ultimate width of 20.1 metres (66 ft), which is the standard legal (i.e. boundary to boundary) width of most roads in the central city of one chain. The work was undertaken by Walter Bory Scott, who at the same time constructed the nearby Worcester Street Bridge; this other bridge is also registered as a Category II heritage structure.

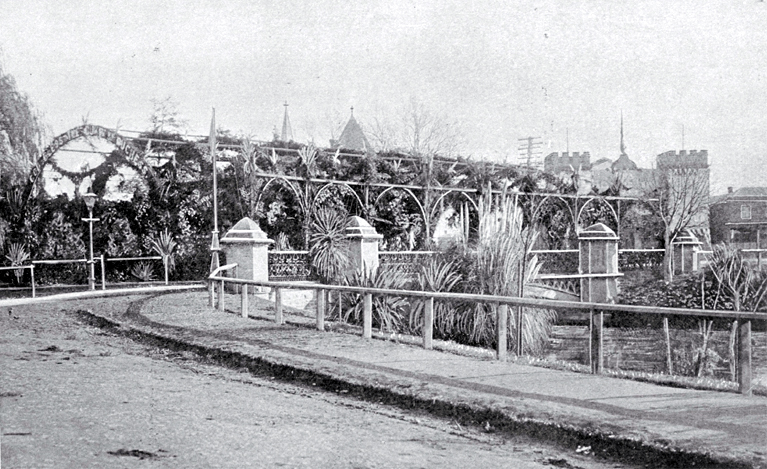
Victoria Bridge decorated with the floral arches in honour of the Duke and Duchess of Cornwall and York in June 1901

The Duke and Duchess of Cornwall and York arrived in Christchurch on 22 June 1901. A number of arches of greenery were erected in their honour, and the last one for them to pass through was the government arch at Victoria Bridge; it was the most impressive of all the arches. Nine semi-circular arches spanned the width of the bridge, and rose to a height of 6.6 metres (22 ft). The royal visitors had been invited by the mayor, Arthur Rhodes, to lay the foundation stone for the Queen Victoria Statue in honour of the Queen, as a jubilee memorial for the Canterbury pioneers, but also as a memorial to those soldiers who had died in the Second Boer War.

On 10 September 1954, the last timetabled tram service in Christchurch crossed the bridge; with the demise of the Papanui–Cashmere route, trams were replaced by buses. In July 1989, Victoria Street through Victoria Square was closed to motorised traffic in preparation for the square to be turned into an urban park, and to enable the construction of the Parkroyal Hotel on the corner of Durham and Kilmore Streets. Part of the bridge deck was removed to make the cast iron girders visible, and tram tracks were incorporated into the design as a reminder of the transport history. At the same time, the bridge was renamed after the outgoing mayor, Hamish Hay.

The bridge appears to have survived the 2011 earthquake undamaged.

== Heritage registration ==
The Hamish Hay Bridge is registered as a Category II heritage item by the New Zealand Historic Places Trust. It was registered on 2 April 2004 with registration number 1832. The bridge is significant for its previous transport function, for its association with several early engineers in Christchurch, for its high regard with the public, as this was central to Victoria Square's redevelopment in the 1980s, and as the first cast iron bridge in New Zealand. It is also notable for its commemoration of the significance of Victoria Square and, through plaques, of the tram system and Hamish Hay, and for establishing the neo-gothic style for Avon River bridges, which was subsequently adopted at another five bridges.

On the same day, the other neo-gothic bridges were also registered (downstream to upstream):

- Colombo Street Bridge, built in circa 1902
- Armagh Street Bridge, built in circa 1883
- Gloucester Street Bridge, built in circa 1883
- Worcester Street Bridge, built in circa 1883
- Armagh Street Park Bridge, built in 1885

Geoffrey Rice, an emeritus professor in history from the University of Canterbury who is writing a book on the history of Victoria Square, regards the Hamish Hay Bridge the most important heritage bridge in Christchurch.

== See also ==
- List of historic places in Christchurch
- Victoria Square, Christchurch
