= Barry Hulbert =

Australian rugby league footballer

Personal information
- Full name: Barry Hulbert
- Born: 1951 (age 74–75)

Playing information
- Position: Five-eighth
Club
| Years | Team | Pld | T | G | FG | P |
|---|---|---|---|---|---|---|
| 1974–76 | St. George | 40 | 3 | 35 | 0 | 79 |
Representative
| Years | Team | Pld | T | G | FG | P |
| 1972 | NSW Country | 1 | 0 | 0 | 0 | 0 |

Barry Hulbert (born 1951) was an Australian rugby league footballer who played in the 1970s.

Hulbert was selected for County Firsts to play City Firsts on 20 May 1972 at the Sydney Cricket Ground.

Two years later in 1974 on a recommendation from Graeme Langlands, Hulbert joined the St. George Dragons for three years, playing 40 first grade games before returning to Wollongong rugby league in 1977.
