= Charles Hulbert (mayor) =

New Zealand mayor

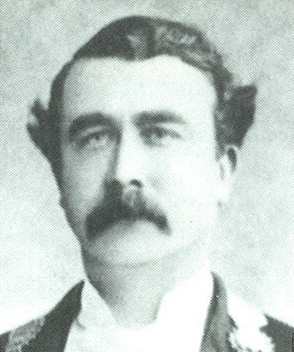
- Hulbert during his mayoralty

13th Mayor of Christchurch
- In office 19 December 1883 – 16 December 1885
- Preceded by: George Ruddenklau
- Succeeded by: Aaron Ayers

Personal details
- Born: 25 August 1841 Bristol, Somerset, England
- Died: 25 June 1926 (aged 84) Mount Victoria, Wellington
- Spouse: Mary Anne Hulbert
- Profession: hatter

Charles Partridge Hulbert (25 August 1841 – 22 June 1926) was Mayor of Christchurch in from December 1883 to December 1885.

== Early life ==
Hulbert was born in Bedminster, Bristol, Somerset, England in 1841. His parents were John Burgess Hulbert (born 1810) and Elizabeth Hulbert (née Partridge, born 1810). On 22 October 1856, many members of the Hulbert family left Bristol on board the Appleton as assisted passengers (i.e. another party paid for their passage, probably the Victorian government) and reached Melbourne on 25 January 1857.

He came to New Zealand in 1860 and participated in the Otago gold rush in Gabriel's Gully in 1863. He fought in the New Zealand Wars.

He married Mary Anne Hulbert (née Godso) in Melbourne in 1869. In 1871, the family lived in Auckland. The Hulberts and three children arrived in Lyttelton, the harbour town of Christchurch, in February 1873.

== Professional life ==
Hulbert was a hatter and had his shop in Christchurch's High Street opposite Strange's, i.e. just north of Lichfield Street. He commenced business in August 1873.

On 11 March 1875, Hulbert's business premises caught fire and burned to the ground. He was insured for £1,050, which represented under-insurance of around £1,000 compared to the loss suffered. Fire walls were not in place at the time and only the quick actions of the volunteer fire brigade stopped the fire from spreading to the wooden buildings on either side of his premises. On New Year's Eve 1876, Hulbert's shop window was damaged and he advertised a £10 reward for information that would lead to a conviction; The Press even commented on this vandalism.

Another fire occurred in the block surrounded by High, Cashel and Manchester Streets on 4 September 1882. It broke out in buildings owned by Charles Hunter Brown and threatened adjacent buildings, some of which also caught fire. Much stock was damaged from various buildings by it being placed onto the opposite side of the roads, where it either got damaged by water or from where it was stolen; this was also the case for Hulbert, whose building was otherwise undamaged.

His business practices and the production process of hats was described in a detailed article in The Press in May 1878. At the time, he employed 11 staff across three departments. He also supplied helmets for the police, collegiate caps for the College, and caps for fire police and volunteers. Due to high tariffs, he could only manufacture more expensive items; low quality items could be imported cheaper from England than made locally. Hulbert claimed at the time that without tariffs, he would be employing between 100 and 200 staff. By the following year, Hulbert also had a hat factory in nearby Bedford Row. By 1883, Hulbert employed about 20 staff who produced about "twelve dozen" hats per week.

Hulbert exhibited at the New Zealand International Exhibition held in 1882 in South Hagley Park, and also had gowns and academic robes. His products were said to be fashionable.

In 1885, Hulbert sold a section in Linwood on the corner of Worcester Street and Stanmore Road to the Linwood Town Board for their proposed office building. Of the sections considered by the board, they chose Hulbert's as most suitable because it was located on the route of the so-called Corporation Line, a tram that was proposed for Worcester Street. The offices to be built became known as the Linwood Borough Council Chambers, and from 1909 to 1993, were used as the Linwood Public Library. Subsequently, the building has been a community facility known as Te Whare Roimata.

== Political career ==
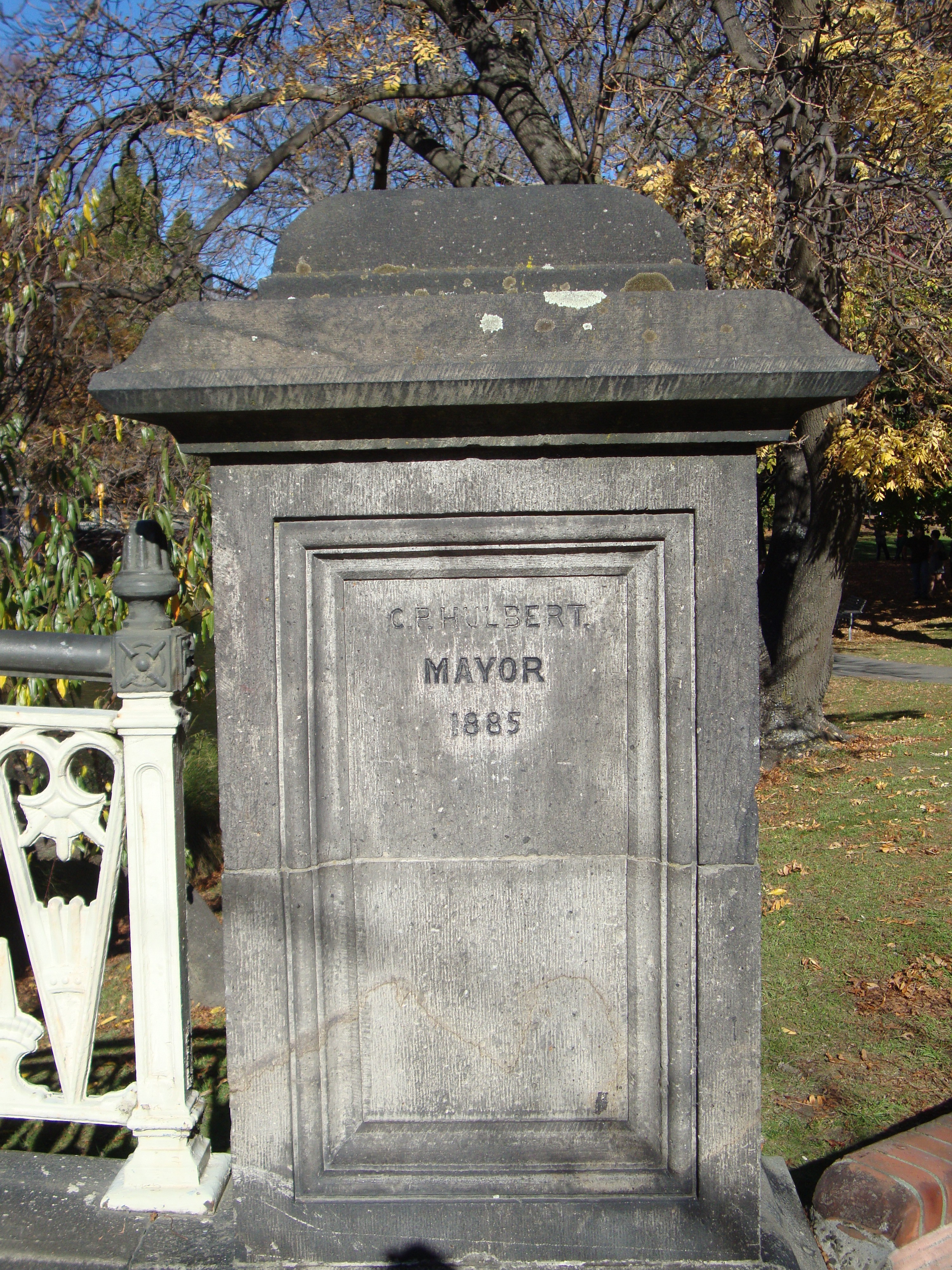
Hulbert's name inscribed in the Worcester Street Bridge pillar

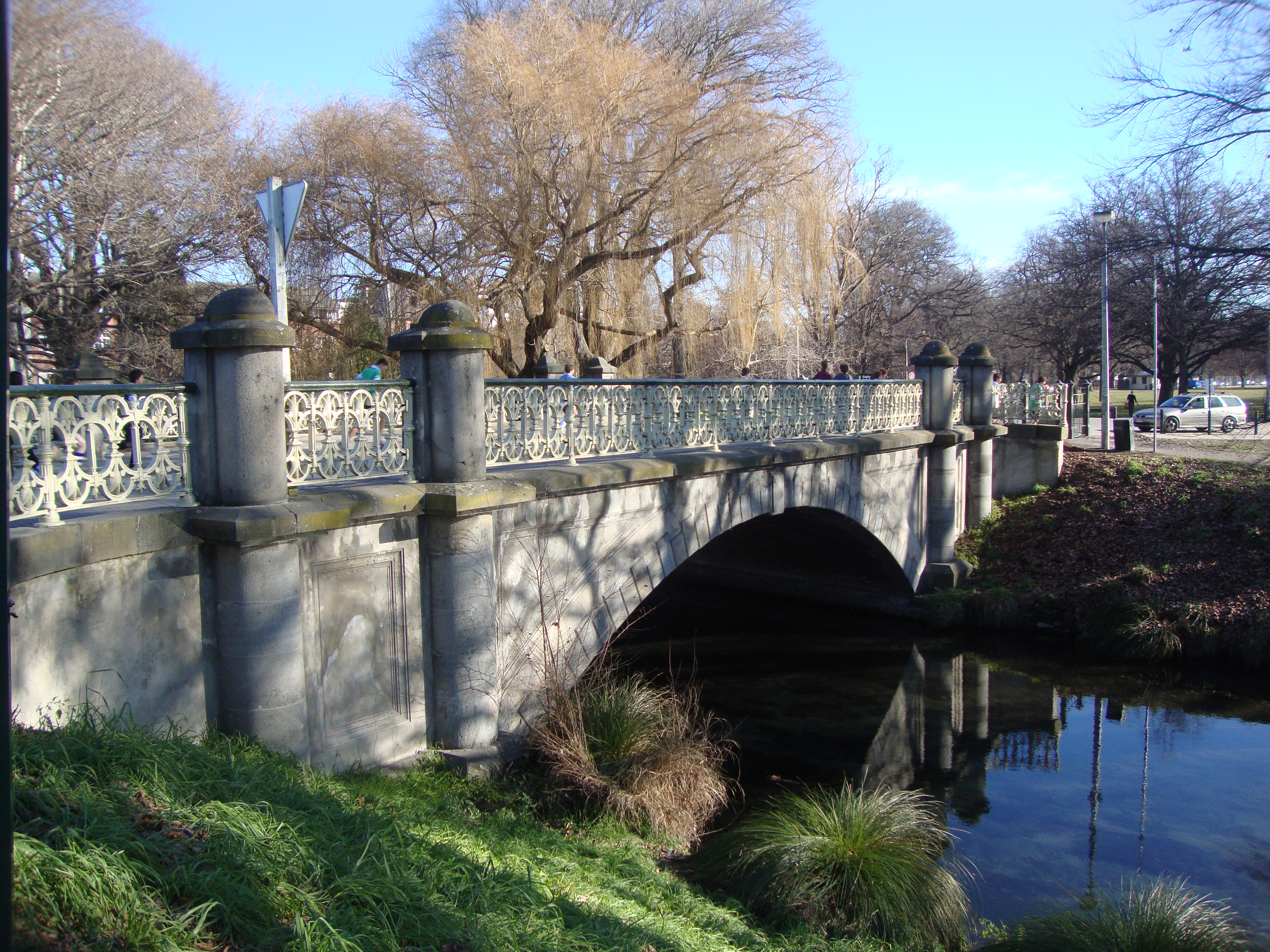
Hulbert opened Armagh Street Park Bridge in December 1885

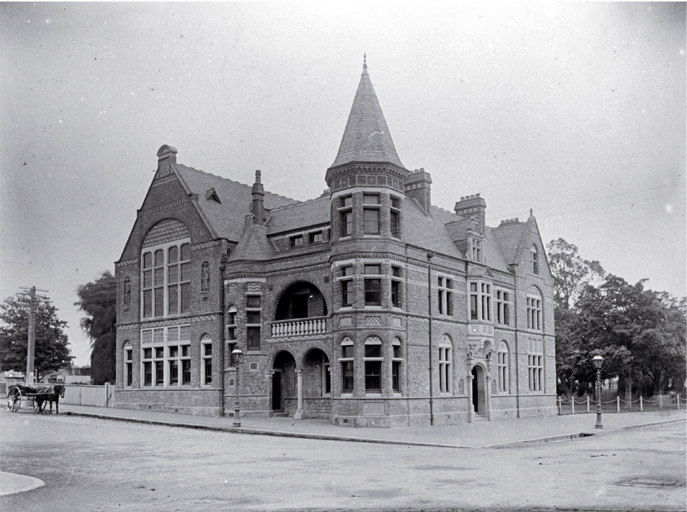
During Hulbert's mayoralty, the design competition for the civic offices was decided

Hulbert first stood for election as Christchurch city councillor in September 1879 in the South East Ward on the Ratepayers' Association ticket. The South East Ward was located south of Hereford and east of Colombo Streets; it was the first time that the ward system was used in an election. The Ratepayers' Association intended to support three candidates in each of the four wards, i.e. a candidate for each available position. Of those 12 possible candidates, 11 were eventually nominated, and 9 of them were elected, including Hulbert. Notable councillors elected in 1879 apart from Hulbert were James Gapes and Aaron Ayers.

At the time, councillors retired by rotation, and Hulbert's term was up in September 1881. He contested the South East Ward against Samuel Manning and was successful, with 556 votes to 519. Later in 1881 at the general election in the Christchurch South electorate, Hulbert proposed John Holmes as a candidate. The other candidate was the former mayor John Anderson, but Holmes was successful.

In 1882, Hulbert became a strong promoter of a proper water supply system for Christchurch, where one of the principal aims was to have water available for fire fighting purposes (in fact, Hulbert's business premises had burned down in 1875). Consequently, Hulbert was asked to join council's Water Supply Committee. Hulbert spoke against a resolution by the Local Board of Health to take the sanitary functions off the city council and carry them out by itself. In July 1882, Mayor George Ruddenklau chaired a large and often rowdy public meeting, proposing a public loan of £60,000 for the installation of water reticulation in the city; there were strong views expressed against such a measure.

On 4 September 1882, Hulbert resigned from Christchurch City Council. He did so at that particular time as elections for the normal rotation of councillors were about to be held, and although he had one more year to serve, he felt that having given his time for three years was enough and somebody else should represent the South East Ward. Hulbert was succeeded as councillor by Frederick Jenkins.

=== Mayor of Christchurch ===
Later in September 1882, Hulbert was part of a deputation to Mayor Ruddenklau asking him to fill the role for another year. Hulbert stated that whilst he had been asked himself to stand as mayor, he supported that Ruddenklau serve another term.

Hulbert received a requisition in September 1883 to become a mayoral candidate in the upcoming election, which he acceded to. Within a fortnight, another requisition was put to councillor Aaron Ayers. Both were nominated for the mayoralty in November 1883, and since both were well-known personalities, the election campaign period was interesting and lively. Ayers had first been elected to council in 1878, and Hulbert had been a councillor until his resignation a year earlier. The incumbent, Mayor Ruddenklau, had decided to retire after two terms as mayor. As was usual at the time, cartoons were circulated that showed the opponents not in a complimentary manner. Hulbert campaigned on improving water supply and drainage for the city. Hulbert won the election, which was held on 28 November (a Wednesday), and received 671 votes to 496, a majority of 175 votes. Leslie Lee acted as the returning officer. The celebrations of Hulbert's election success were chaired by Henry Thomson, MHR, like Hulbert a senior Freemason.

One of the last public duties carried out by Ruddenklau was to open the Armagh Street Bridge on 11 December 1883. Speeches at the opening were given by Mayor Ruddenklau, Mayor-elect Hulbert, and senior councillor Ayers. Hulbert was installed as mayor on 19 December 1883.

From March of the following year, requests were put to Hulbert to contest the 1884 election for Parliament, either in the Stanmore or Christchurch North electorate. In late June, he announced that he would not accede to the request.

Hulbert had a leading role in the discussions about the public library, which had since its earliest days (it was established in 1859 as the Christchurch Mechanics' Institute) been in financial difficulties. In May 1884, he negotiated with William Montgomery, Charles Bowen, William Vincent, Frederic Jones, Thomas Joynt, and Edward Cephas John Stevens.

Hulbert intended to retire at the end of his one-year term as mayor, but a petition bearing the names of 250 people was put to him to stand for another term. He acceded to the request, as it was signed by many influential people. Newspaper reporting of his first mayoral term was favourable, and on 17 November 1884, Hulbert was declared re-elected unopposed. He was installed as mayor for a second term on 17 December 1884. In March 1885, Hulbert presided over a banquet held in honour of Sir Julius Vogel. In front of some 300 guests, Hulbert gave the main speech of the evening. Attendees of the banquet included Leonard Harper, Francis James Garrick, Hugh Murray-Aynsley, Richmond Beetham (Resident Magistrate), Lieutenant Colonel Alexander Lean, Jack T. Matson, James Dupré Lance, William Campbell Walker, Justice Phillip Johnston, John Thomas Peacock, William Reeves, De Renzie Brett, John Holmes, and John Ollivier.

Hulbert visited Auckland during his mayoralty, leaving Lyttelton on 7 August 1885 on the SS Wairarapa. He attended the annual prize giving at the Auckland Bowling and Lawn Tennis Club, having been a previous Auckland resident and a bowler himself. He complimented the development of Auckland since he had lived there 14 years earlier, but made a remark that Christchurch streets are in better condition than Auckland's. The Auckland mayor, William Waddel, quickly replied that "Christchurch would be none the worse for a hill or two around it." The Auckland mayor took Hulbert on a tour of water supply infrastructure at Western Springs. Hulbert returned to Lyttelton on 27 August on the SS Hawea.

Towards the end of Hulbert's mayoralty, an architectural competition was held for new municipal offices. The council administration was using the old Land Office and premises were cramped. There had previously been a design competition for new offices and a town hall to be erected in Market Square in 1879, but the scheme was abandoned due to the high cost. The city councillors voted on the winner of this recent competition on 7 December 1885 and chose the very modern Queen Anne design by Samuel Hurst Seager. Quite some controversy developed over this decision and this went on for a long time, but the building was constructed and is today known as Our City.

After Ayers' election, they attended civic duties as mayor and mayor-elect, for example the opening of a band rotunda in Latimer Square, the start of the construction of the Corporation Line, and the opening of the Armagh Street Bridge into Hagley Park. Ayers was installed as mayor by Hulbert at a meeting on 16 December 1885.

At the last city council meeting chaired by Hulbert, there was unanimous agreement that the mayor had discharged his duties with a lot of energy and skill. Councillor Louisson explained that "he had been asked to come forward for the mayoralty, but had been deterred from doing so by the thought that he would be unable to devote so much of his time, and give such care to the work of the city", as Hulbert had done. Hulbert foreshadowed that he intended to stand for election as councillor. The Star newspaper reviewed Hulbert's term in very complimentary words, and a complimentary ball for the mayor and mayoress, attended by Governor William Jervois, was given in the Stone Chamber of the Canterbury Provincial Council Buildings.

=== Post-mayoral period ===
Hulbert served a final term as councillor in 1886.

Hulbert's character faults were described as his having had a manner that was sometimes overbearing, and in extreme situations, he could be brusque or even rude. He could be petty or even childish if he didn't get his way, and his resignation as a councillor in 1882 was described by a local newspaper, The Star, as one of those occasions. His strengths included that he held strong opinions that he stood for, and that he was a warm-hearted man with many friends.

== Other activities ==
Hulbert was a member of the Loyal Benevolent Lodge (No. 5430) and for a time was their Grandmaster. A New Zealand branch of the St John Ambulance was first founded in Christchurch on 30 April 1885. It was decided to appoint the Governor (William Jervois) as president, and the mayors of Christchurch (Hulbert), Sydenham (William White), and St Albans (Benjamin Bull) as vice-presidents. Meetings during the year were generally chaired by Hulbert, who took such interest in the organisation that after the first annual meeting, he was asked to remain a vice-chair, even though the mayoralty had gone to Ayers by then.

Hulbert played bowls and participated in cricket. In 1885, Hulbert joined the Canterbury Jockey Club.

For many years, Hulbert was on the committee Christchurch East School. The school committee, at its monthly meeting in July 1885, passed the following resolution:

That in the true interests of the children, it is advisable that a portion of the scriptures be read by them at the opening of school each day, and the Lord's Prayer be reverentially recited, provided such can be done without violating the requirements of the Education Act.

The motion was passed against the wishes of Hulbert and the chairman (who was Jewish). Hulbert resigned over the issue, citing that he did not wish to be on a board that passed motions that were illegal. The chairman obtained a legal opinion from the office of Thomas Joynt and Acton Adams, which confirmed that the motion was indeed in violation of the Act.

== Death ==
External image
- Gravestone before earthquake damage

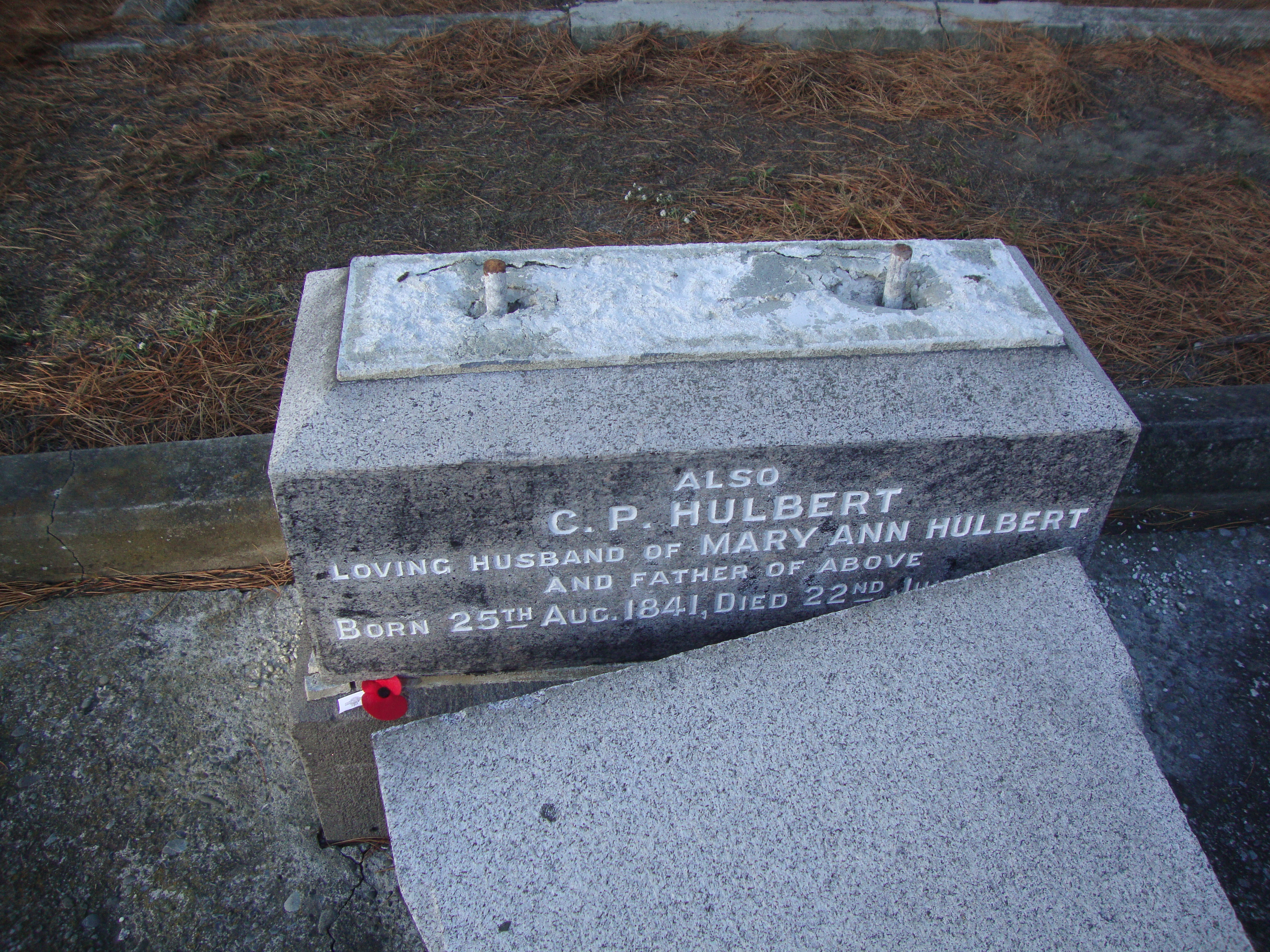
Hulbert's gravestone fell over in the 2011 Christchurch earthquake

During the time of the mayoralty, the Hulbert family lived in Linwood.

Hulbert died on 22 June 1926 at his home in 9 Prince Street, Wellington. He was buried at the family grave in Linwood Cemetery in Christchurch. His son, Captain Leslie Hulbert, died in WWI in France. Another son, Walter Hulbert, also served in WWI but returned home and died in 1961.

Hulbert Street in Christchurch's suburb of Linwood is named after him.
