= John Hulbert =

John Hulbert may refer to:

- John W. Hulbert (1770–1831), U.S. Representative from Massachusetts
- John Hulbert (executioner) (1867–1929), executioner for the states of New York, New Jersey and Massachusetts
