= Hulbert, Michigan =

- Unincorporated community
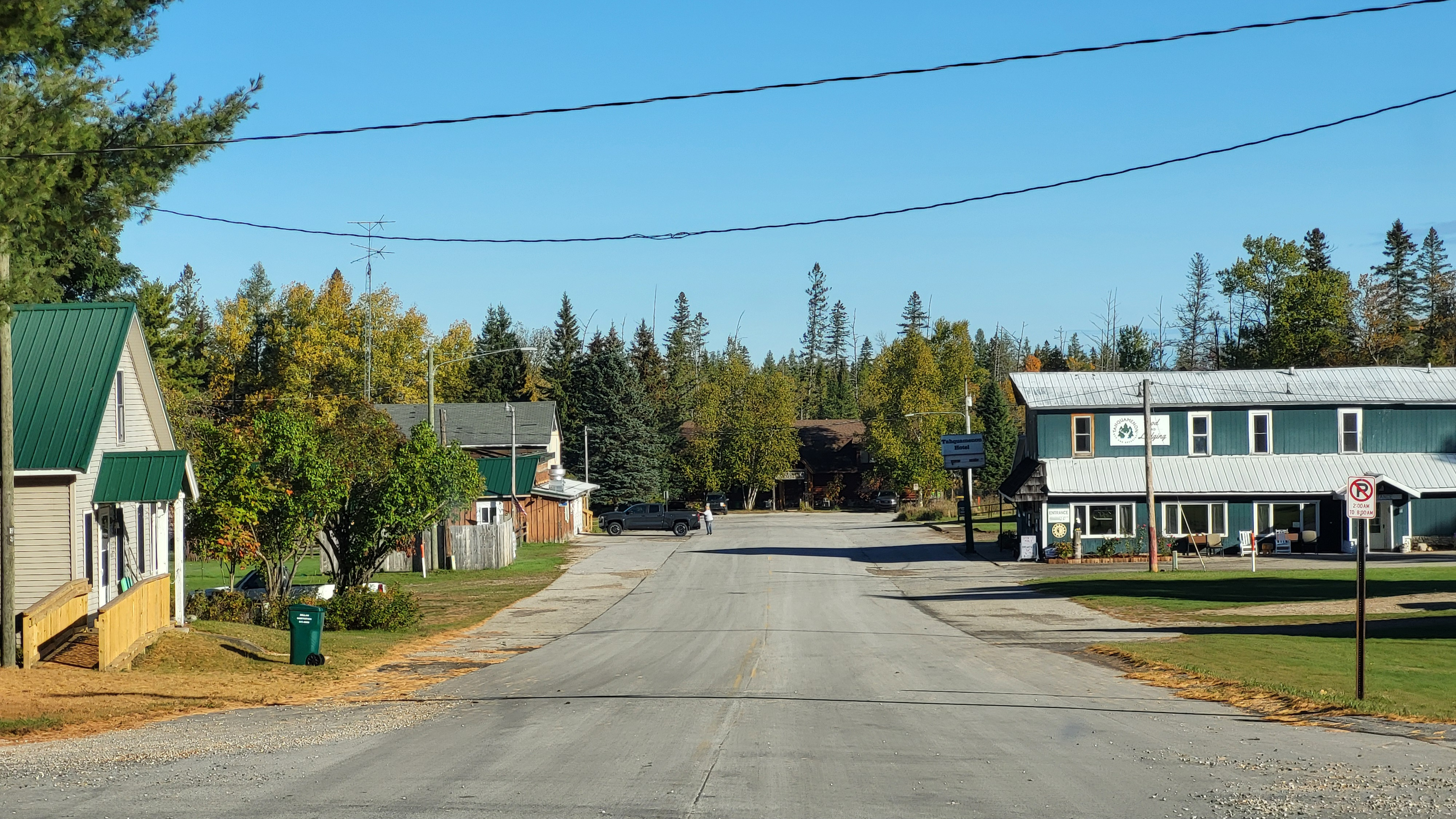
- Looking north along S. Maple Street

- Location within the state of Michigan Location within the United States
- Coordinates: 46°21′15″N 85°09′00″W
- Country: United States
- State: Michigan
- County: Chippewa
- Township: Hulbert
- Established: 1872
- Elevation: 751 ft (229 m)
- Time zone: UTC-5 (Eastern (EST))
  - Summer (DST): UTC-4 (EDT)
- ZIP code(s): 49728 (Eckerman); 49748
- Area code: 906
- GNIS feature ID: 628792

Hulbert is an unincorporated community in Chippewa County in the U.S. state of Michigan. It is located within Hulbert Township just north of M-28. As an unincorporated community, Hulbert has no legally defined boundaries or population statistics of its own but does have its own post office with the 49748 ZIP Code.

== Geography ==
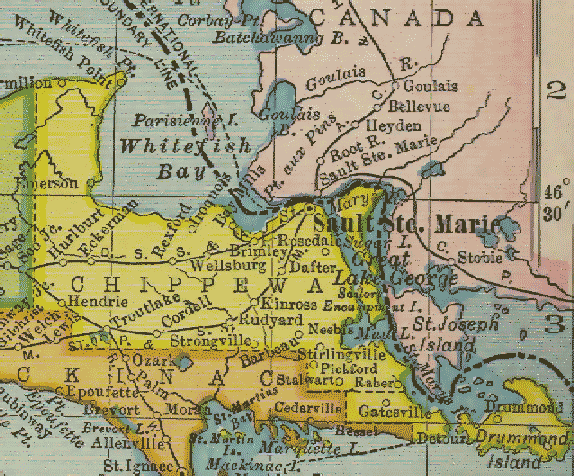
Hulbert (spelled as Hurlburt) appearing on a 1904 map of Chippewa County

Hulbert is a rural community in western Chippewa County in the Upper Peninsula. The community is located within Hulbert Township about 40 miles (64 km) south of the Tahquamenon Falls. The community sits at an elevation of 751 feet (229 m) above sea level.

The center of the community is located slightly north of M-28 and about 5.0 miles (8.0 km) west of M-123. Hulbert is the only community within Hulbert Township, which is the least-populated municipality in the county; the township recorded a population of only 171 at the 2020 census. Other nearby unincorporated communities include Seewhy, Eckerman Corner, and Eckerman to the east, as well as Strongs Corner and Strongs further east. Trout Lake is located to the southeast. Betty B Landing and Soo Junction are to the west in Luce County. The nearest incorporated municipality is the village of Newberry about 23.0 miles (37.0 km) to the west via roadway.

Hulbert is located near the East Branch of the Tahquamenon River. The surrounding area is heavily forested and contains portions of the Hiawatha National Forest and Newberry Unit of the Lake Superior State Forest. Hulbert Lake is located slightly south of the community opposite of M-28. The lake, historically known as Be-ne-gah-mah and Lake Glimmerglass, is a secluded fishing destination and helped contribute to the community's early development.

The Hulbert Township Hall is located in the center of the community at 37686 West 4th Street. Hulbert contains its own post office located at 10395 South Maple Street. The post office uses the 49748 ZIP Code, which serves most of Hulbert Township and very small portions of southeast McMillan Township in Luce County. Some areas to the east of Hulbert may use the Eckerman 49728 ZIP Code. The community of Hulbert is served by Tahquamenon Area Schools in Newberry. Hulbert Township is the only area of Chippewa County to be served by Tahquamenon Area Schools, which is the largest public school district by area in the state of Michigan and the largest in the country east of the Mississippi River.

== History ==
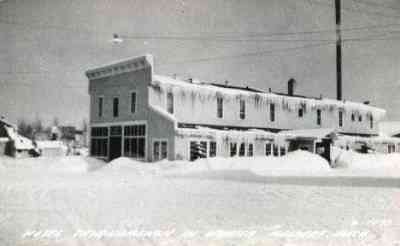
The Tahquamenon Hotel building around 1920

This remote area of Chippewa County was first explored by pioneer Francis Hulbert in the winter of 1872–1873. He surveyed the area and believed its dense forest area would be very valuable for future lumbering. He also discovered an isolated frozen lake that he named Be-ne-gah-mah (now known as Hulbert Lake). In the harsh winter, he never settled in the area but instead quickly traveled to Marquette in order to claim ownership and acquire a deed for the land. Francis became the area's most prominent landowner, although he never lived in or developed the area. Instead, his son Richard Hulbert began settling the area. The area adopted their name, and the township was formally organized as Hulbert Township in 1888.

The first permanent settlers to the area were the DeWitt family, and a post office was first established here on January 23, 1892. Elmer Holley served as Hulbert's first postmaster. In 1893, the Duluth, South Shore and Atlantic Railway built a rail line through Hulbert on its way to Marquette. Growth in Hulbert was minimal, as the lumber industry had not yet developed in the remote area at the time. That year, Hulbert had a permanent population of 25, and its only business was a general store operated by W. H. Townsend. As a result of the Panic of 1893, Richard Hulbert was forced to sell all of his family's land in the area after the death of his father in 1896. In 1897, he sold the land to lumber entrepreneur A. M. Chesbrough, whose family operated several successful sawmills in the county, including Emerson. The community was unsuccessful, and the Hulbert post office closed on March 31, 1908. Richard Hulbert, who worked with and befriended the Chesbrough family, was able to reacquire about half of the land in the area.

Hulbert declined and was nearly abandoned until James Shepherd Parrish built the Parrish Wooden Bowl Factory in 1919. The post office was reestablished under the name Taquaminon (or Tahquamenon) on March 28, 1919. Eda Dillingham served as the first postmaster of the new post office, and it was renamed back to Hulbert on July 30, 1920. The Hulbert post office has remained in operation ever since. The community regrowth would also benefit from the original creation of state highway M-25, which ran from near Marquette to Sault Ste. Marie. The highway would be redesignated as part of the longer M-28 in 1927.

Built in 1919, one of the oldest buildings in Hulbert is the original bunkhouse and company store belonging to the Parrish Wooden Bowl Factory. After the company closed, the structure was sold and converted into the Tahquamenon Hotel, which remains in operation today as the Tahquamenon Bed and Breakfast. By 1939, Hulbert was flourishing and had a permanent population of about 300. Due to the scenic environment and snowy winters, Hulbert began to rely on tourism and hunting after the lumber industry declined. White-tailed deer were so abundant in the area that local barber S. R. Freeman established several deer farms that allowed visitors to feed and interact with the deer. Following his idea, the Michigan State Conservation Department also opened several experimental deer farms in the area. Around 1960, the Duluth, South Shore and Atlantic Railway ceased operation, and the rail lines were later removed. Hulbert no longer has any railroad service, although the Grand Elk Railroad operates a line that runs slightly southwest through Soo Junction on a route from Trout Lake to Munising.
