= Armagh Street Park Bridge =

Bridge near Hagley Park, Christchurch, New Zealand

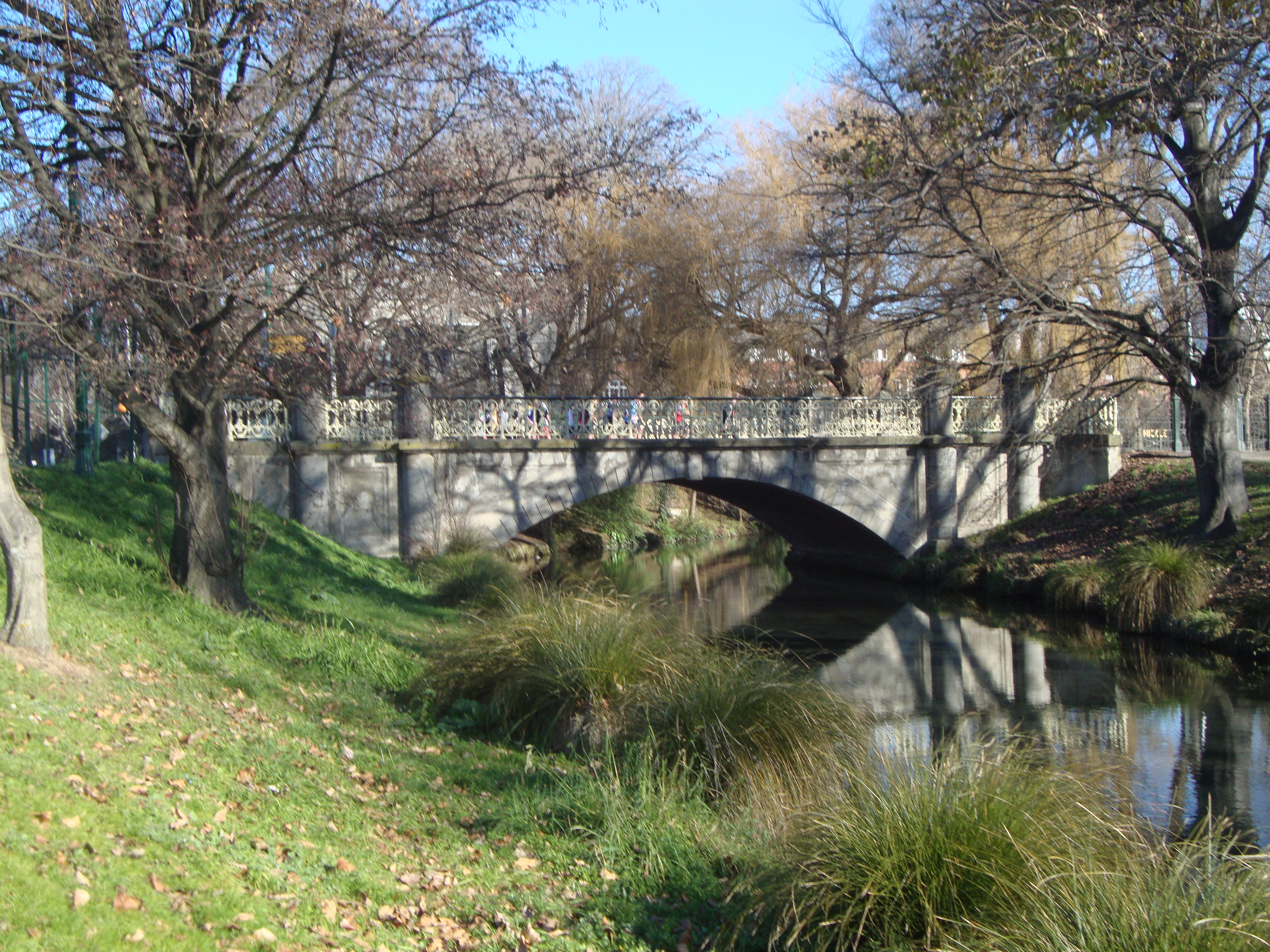
- The bridge in 2011
- Coordinates: 43.52878°S 172.62733°E
- Carries: cars, pedestrians, cyclists
- Crosses: Avon River / Ōtākaro
- Locale: Hagley Park, Christchurch, New Zealand
- Maintained by: Christchurch City Council

Characteristics
- Design: brick arch
- Material: Clay brick, stone, cast-iron
- Width: 41 feet (12 m)
- Longest span: 40 feet (12 m)
- No. of spans: 1

History
- Designer: Charles Walkden
- Constructed by: Greig and Hunter
- Opened: 26 November 1885

Heritage New Zealand – Category 2
- Designated: 6 June 2004
- Reference no.: 1834

Location
- Interactive map of Armagh Street Park Bridge

The Armagh Street Park Bridge, also known as the Park Bridge, College Bridge and Armagh Street Hagley Bridge, is located in Christchurch, New Zealand. The structure, built in 1885, spans the Avon River / Ōtākaro at Park Terrace and leads into Hagley Park. The bridge is registered as a Category II heritage structure with Heritage New Zealand.

== History ==
The original bridge at the end of Armagh Street crossing the Avon River / Ōtākaro into Hagley Park was a two-span wooden footbridge, built in 1860. The desire to enable a horse and carriage to drive through the park from Christchurch to Riccarton prompted the council to commission a more permanent bridge in 1885. Much like the Armagh Street Bridge a few blocks away, Charles Walkden (1824–1908), the City Surveyor, provided the design while Greig & Hunter were the builders.

Around 1935 Abigail Mickle donated iron gates to be installed at the western end of the bridge in Hagley Park as a memorial to her late husband, Dr Adam Mickle, a surgeon and former city councillor.

Today the bridge primarily provides vehicle access to the Christchurch Botanic Gardens car parking area, and is also part of the Uni-Cycle bike path.

In 2004, the bridge was registered as a Category II heritage structure with the New Zealand Historic Places Trust.

== Architecture and fittings ==
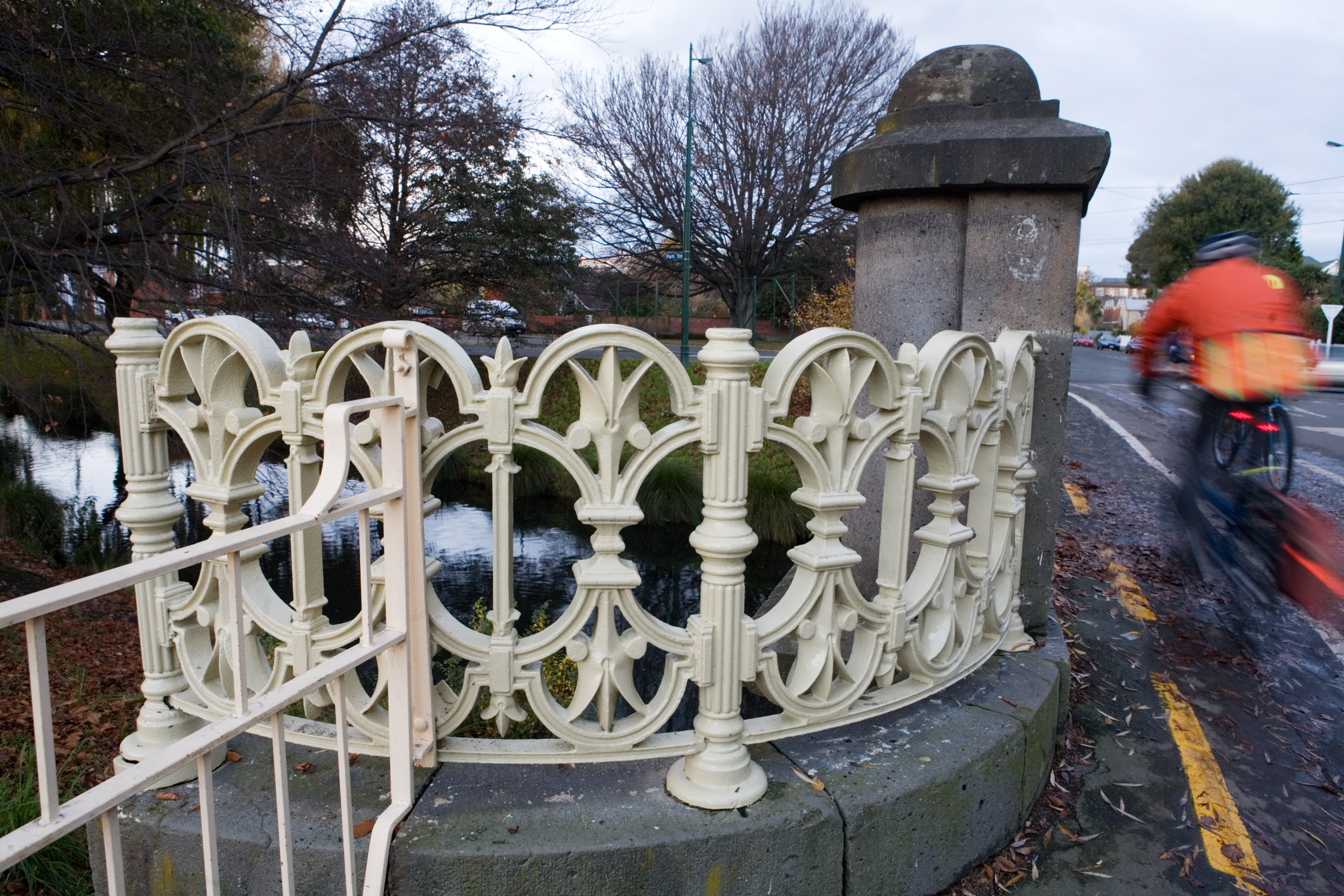
Cast iron railings

It is constructed of brick, stone from Mount Somers, cast iron, as well as unreinforced concrete ribbing, unreinforced concrete thrust blocks, and unreinforced concrete footings. The masonry arch features a clear span of 40 feet (12 m). At 41 feet (12 m) wide, the bridge accommodates two lanes of vehicle traffic as well as pedestrian footpaths on both sides. Along with the balustrade's neo-gothic ornamentation, the structure coheres with the established pattern for central city bridges.
