= Hulbert Township, Michigan =

- Civil township
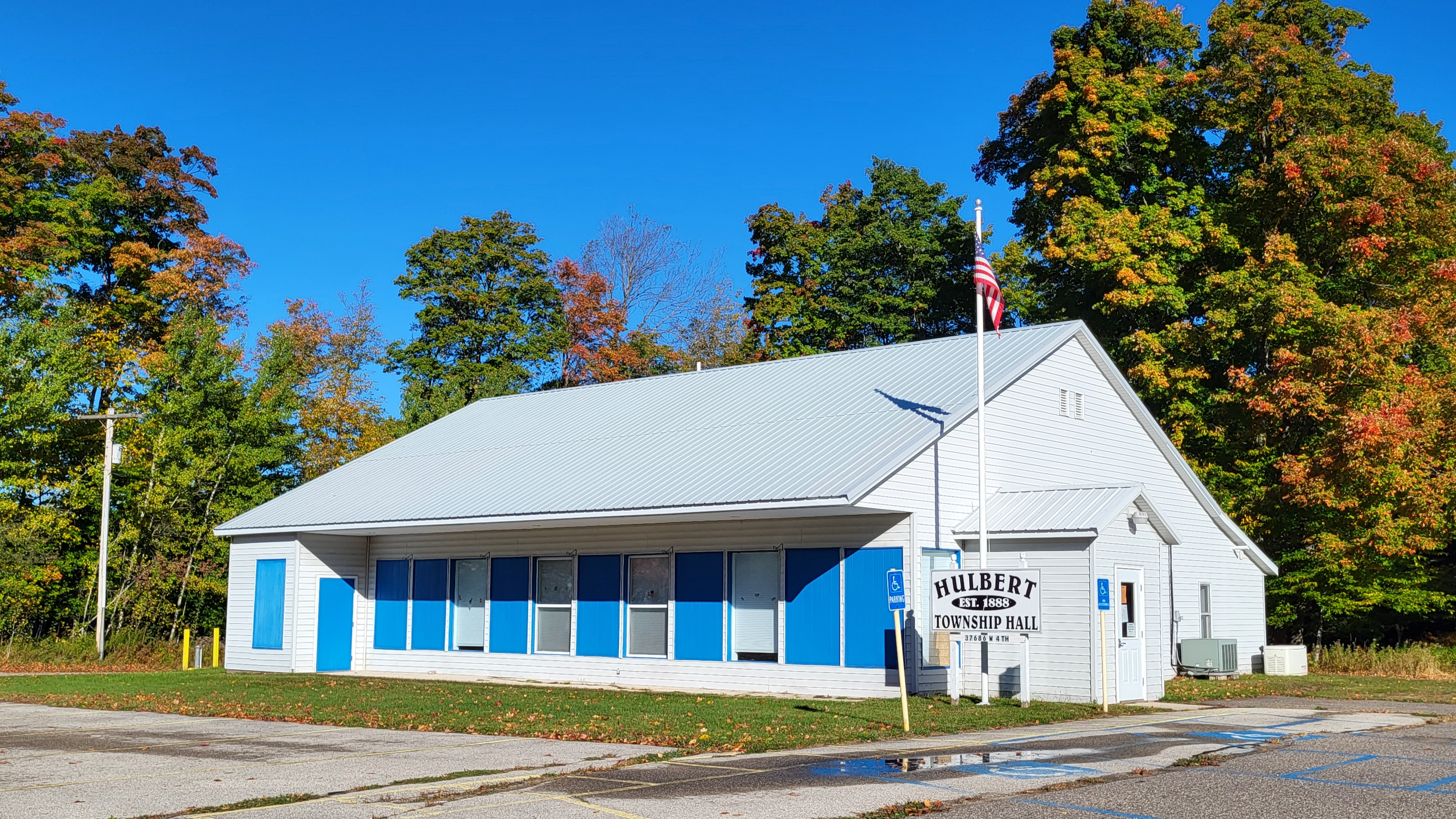
- Hulbert Township Hall in Hulbert

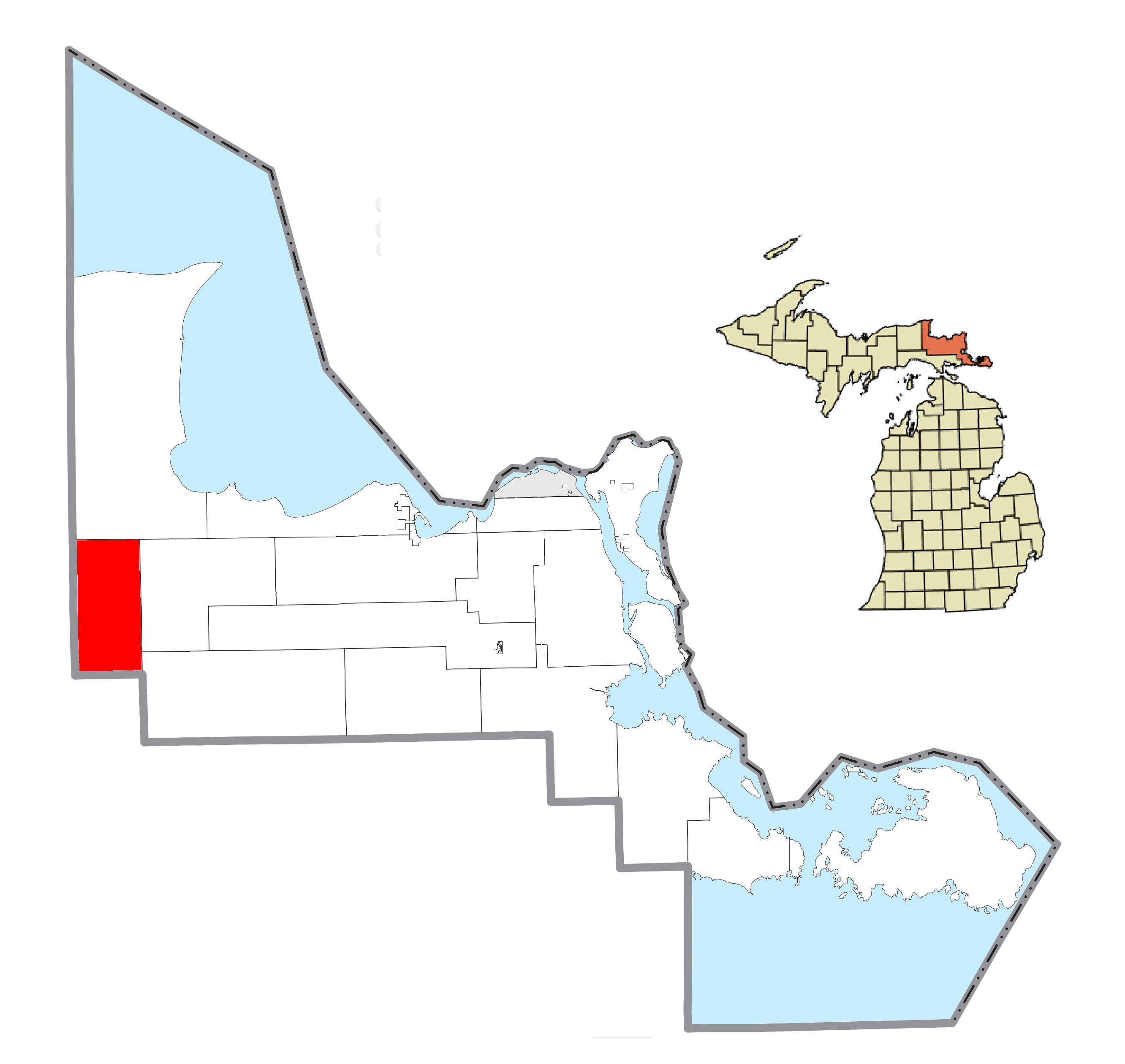
- Location within Chippewa County

- Location within the state of Michigan Location within the United States
- Coordinates: 46°19′13″N 85°09′57″W
- Country: United States
- State: Michigan
- County: Chippewa
- Established: 1888

Government
  - Supervisor: Todd Davis
  - Clerk: Cynthia Dewitt

Area
  - Total: 71.82 sq mi (186.01 km^{2})
  - Land: 70.85 sq mi (183.50 km^{2})
  - Water: 0.97 sq mi (2.51 km^{2})
- Elevation: 735 ft (224 m)

Population (2020)
  - Total: 171
  - Density: 2.41/sq mi (0.93/km^{2})
- Time zone: UTC-5 (Eastern (EST))
  - Summer (DST): UTC-4 (EDT)
- ZIP code(s): 49728 (Eckerman); 49748 (Hulbert)
- Area code: 906
- FIPS code: 26-39860
- GNIS feature ID: 1626502
- Website: https://www.hulberttwp.com/

Hulbert Township is a civil township of Chippewa County in the U.S. state of Michigan. The population was 171 at the 2020 census, which ranks it as the least-populated municipality in Chippewa County.

== Geography ==
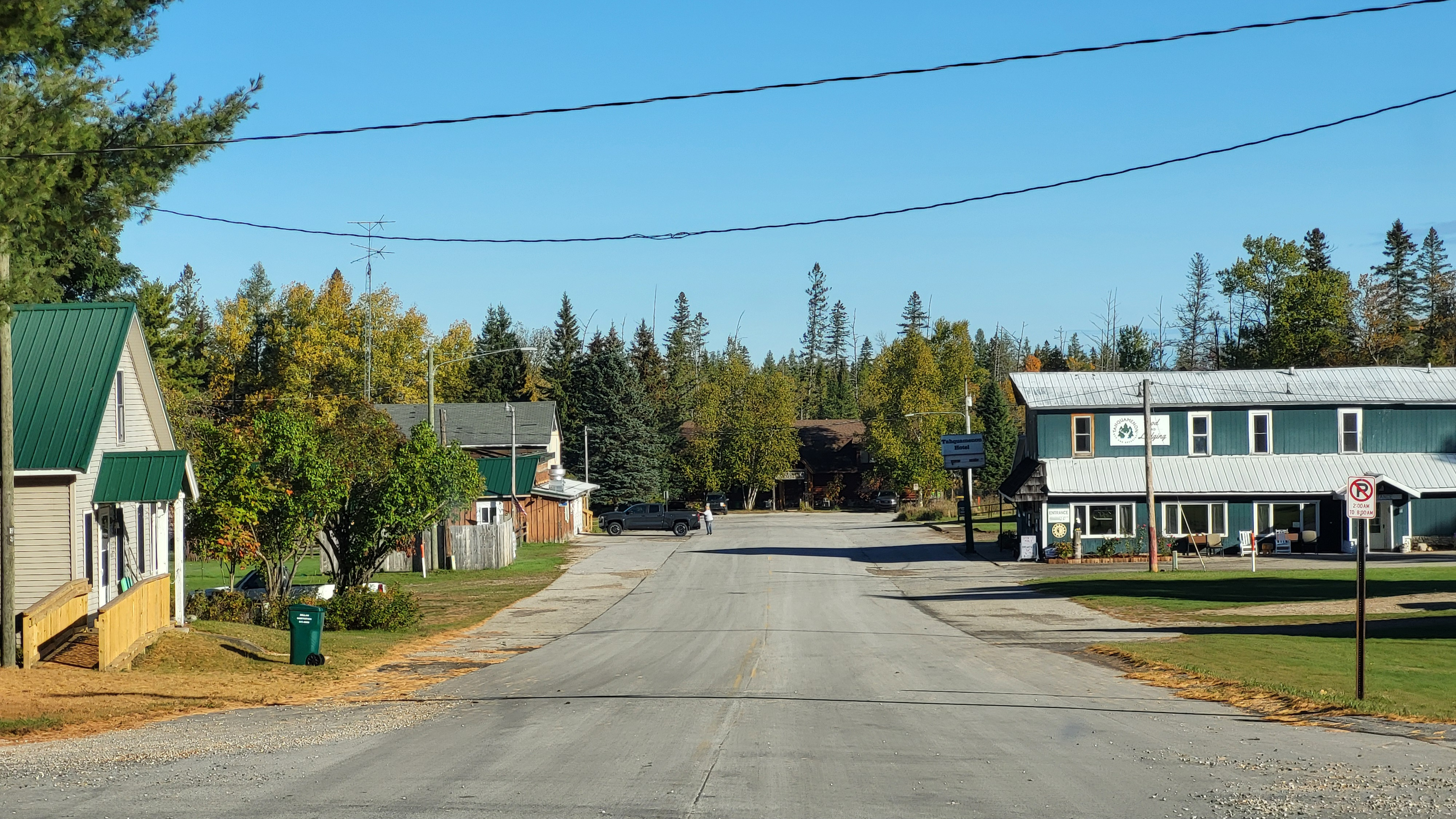
Unincorporated community of Hulbert looking north along S. Maple Street

Hulbert Township is located in western Chippewa County on the Upper Peninsula of Michigan. The township is bordered to the west by Luce County and to the south by Mackinac County. Highway M-28 crosses the township, leading east towards Sault Ste. Marie and west towards Newberry. The unincorporated community of Hulbert is located 1.5 miles (2.4 km) north of M-28 along the former Duluth, South Shore and Atlantic Railway.

According to the United States Census Bureau, the township has a total area of 71.8 square miles (186.0 km^{2}), of which 70.8 square miles (183.5 km^{2}) is land and 0.97 square miles (2.5 km^{2}), or 1.35%, is water. The largest water body is Hulbert Lake in the eastern part of the township south of M-28, and extending east into Chippewa Township. Much of the township is part of Lake Superior State Forest.

== Demographics ==
As of the census of 2000, there were 211 people, 89 households, and 59 families residing in the township. The population density was 3.0 inhabitants per square mile (1.2/km^{2}). There were 224 housing units at an average density of 3.2 per square mile (1.2/km^{2}). The racial makeup of the township was 93.36% White, 3.32% Native American, and 3.32% from two or more races.

There were 89 households, out of which 19.1% had children under the age of 18 living with them, 53.9% were married couples living together, 11.2% had a female householder with no husband present, and 32.6% were non-families. 32.6% of all households were made up of individuals, and 21.3% had someone living alone who was 65 years of age or older. The average household size was 2.37 and the average family size was 2.67.

In the township the population was spread out, with 16.6% under the age of 18, 5.7% from 18 to 24, 21.8% from 25 to 44, 28.0% from 45 to 64, and 28.0% who were 65 years of age or older. The median age was 50 years. For every 100 females, there were 129.3 males. For every 100 females age 18 and over, there were 137.8 males.

The median income for a household in the township was $24,286, and the median income for a family was $30,833. Males had a median income of $35,000 versus $11,250 for females. The per capita income for the township was $13,624. About 19.0% of families and 25.5% of the population were below the poverty line, including 37.8% of those under the age of eighteen and 14.0% of those 65 or over.
