= William Davenport Hulbert =

American novelist

William Davenport Hulbert (1868–1913) was an American naturalist and writer of fiction.

== Career ==
Born William Davenport Hulbert in 1868 on Mackinac Island, Michigan and lived for a while on the upper peninsula of Michigan in the Taquamenon River area. He was privately educated and did not marry. From 1895 until his death, he wrote short fiction for magazines. White Pine Days on the Taquamenon is a collection of stories about lumbering, and was edited by his brother Richard C. Hulbert.

== Bibliography ==
=== Fiction ===
- Life Saving on the Great Lakes
- White Pine Days on the Taquamenon
- Forest Neighbors; Life Stories of Wild Animals
