= Charles Augustus Hulbert =

English clergyman (1804–1888)

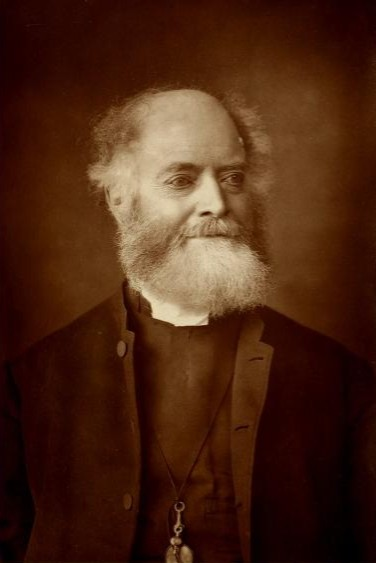
- Born: Charles Augustus Hulbert; December 31, 1804; Shrewsbury, Shropshire.
- Died: March 5, 1888 (aged 83)
- Occupation: Clergyman
- Spouse: Mary Lacy (m. 1837)
- Children: 7

Charles Augustus Hulbert (31 December 1804 – March 1888) was an English clergyman.

== Life ==
The eldest son of Charles Hulbert, he was born at Coleham, near Shrewsbury, on 31 December 1804; and was educated at Shrewsbury School and Sidney Sussex College, Cambridge. He graduated B.A. in 1834, and M.A. in 1837.

He was curate of St. Mary's, Islington, 1834 to 1839, then perpetual curate of Slaithwaite, Yorkshire, 1839 to 1867, and vicar of Almondbury, near Huddersfield, from 1867 to 1888. He was mainly instrumental in the restoration of Almondbury Church. In 1866 he was collated honorary canon of Ripon Cathedral. He died in March 1888 aged 83.

== Works ==
Among other works he published:

- Poetical Recreations, Shrewsbury, 1828.
- Theotokos, or the Song of the Virgin, 1842.
- The Gospel revealed to Job, 1853.
- Annals of the Church in Slaithwaite, 1864.
- Extracts from the Diary of the Rev. Robert Meeke, 1875.
- Annals of the Church and Parish of Almondbury, Yorkshire, 1882.
- Supplementary Annals, 1885.

== Notes ==
Attribution

This article incorporates text from a publication now in the public domain: "Hulbert, Charles". Dictionary of National Biography. London: Smith, Elder & Co. 1885–1900.
