= Armagh Street Bridge =

Bridge in Victoria Square, New Zealand

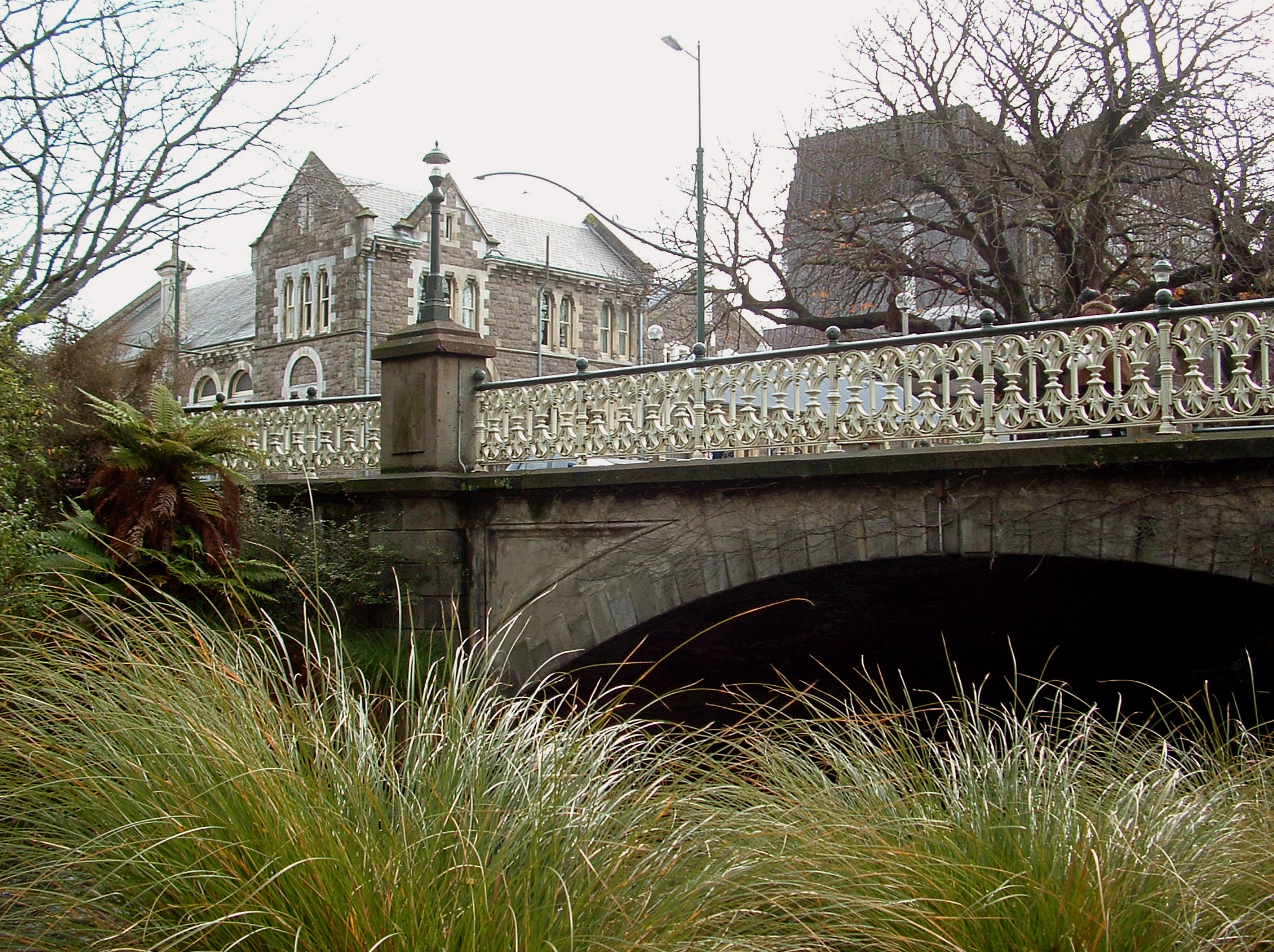
- The bridge in 2009
- Coordinates: 43.52877°S 172.63475°E
- Carries: cars, trams, pedestrians, cyclists
- Crosses: Avon River
- Locale: Victoria Square, Christchurch, New Zealand

Characteristics
- Design: brick arch
- Material: Clay brick, stone, cast-iron
- Longest span: 12.2 metres (40 ft)
- No. of spans: 1
- Clearance below: 2 metres (6 ft 7 in)

History
- Designer: Charles Walkden
- Constructed by: Greig and Hunter
- Opened: 11 December 1883

Heritage New Zealand – Category 2
- Designated: 4 April 2004
- Reference no.: 1830

Location
- Interactive map of Armagh Street Bridge

The Armagh Street Bridge is a historic bridge on Armagh Street in Christchurch Central City. It sits between the Convention Centre Precinct and the Magistrate's Court at the south-west corner of Victoria Square. Its initial importance was it making a connection to the Canterbury Provincial Council Buildings just beyond the Magistrate's Court.

== History ==
The original wooden bridge crossing the Avon River at Armagh Street was built in 1873, and by early 1883 heavy traffic had contributed to the planking and cross-bearers wearing out. At the recommendation of the city surveyor, Charles Walkden, the Christchurch City Council commissioned a new bridge with an estimated cost of £1,700.

The bridge was constructed in 1883 by builders William Greig and John Hunter using stone quarried from Hoon Hay. Construction of the bridge took only six months, despite some delays. The bridge was opened at noon on 11 December 1883 and was one of the last public duties carried out by George Ruddenklau, who had chosen to retire from public office and had not contested the mayoral election a fortnight earlier. Speeches at the opening were given by Mayor Ruddenklau, Mayor-elect Charles Hulbert, and senior councillor Aaron Ayers. With a span of 40 feet (12 m), the bridge was initially much wider than the river, but the Minister of Lands in late 1883 declined permission to widen the river from 26 feet (7.9 m). The river was ultimately widened to fill the full span of the bridge when Market Place was landscaped to become Victoria Square.

Today the bridge carries normal vehicle traffic, as well as tram tracks on the northern lane that were installed in the 1990s as part of the Christchurch tramway system. In 2004 the bridge was registered by Heritage New Zealand as a category-II historic place due to its significance to Victorian era Christchurch and its neo-Gothic design.

The bridge experienced major damage during the 2011 Christchurch earthquake and was repaired and reinforced in 2016 for less than NZ$1,000,000.

== Design ==
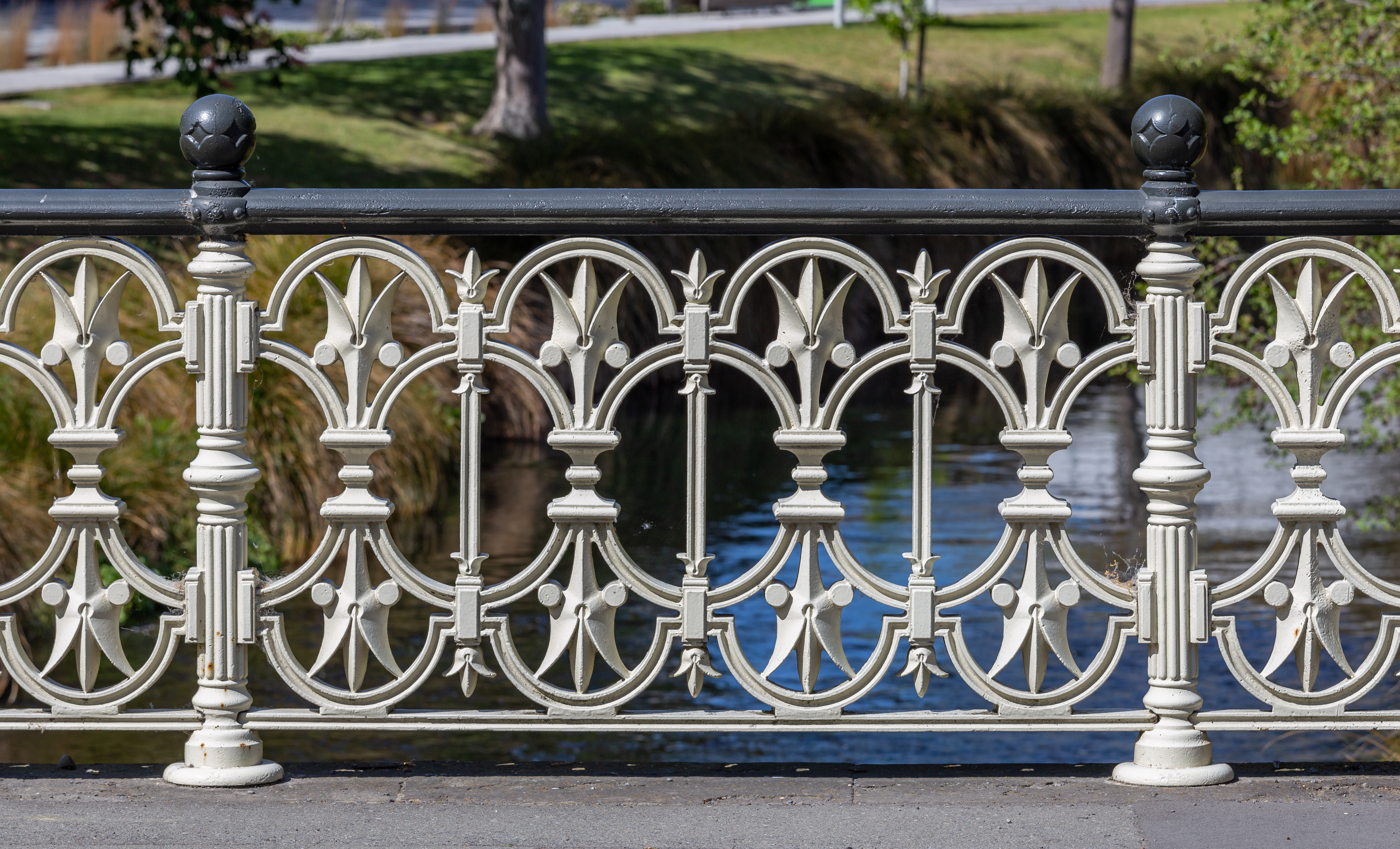
The cast-iron balustrades on the bridge

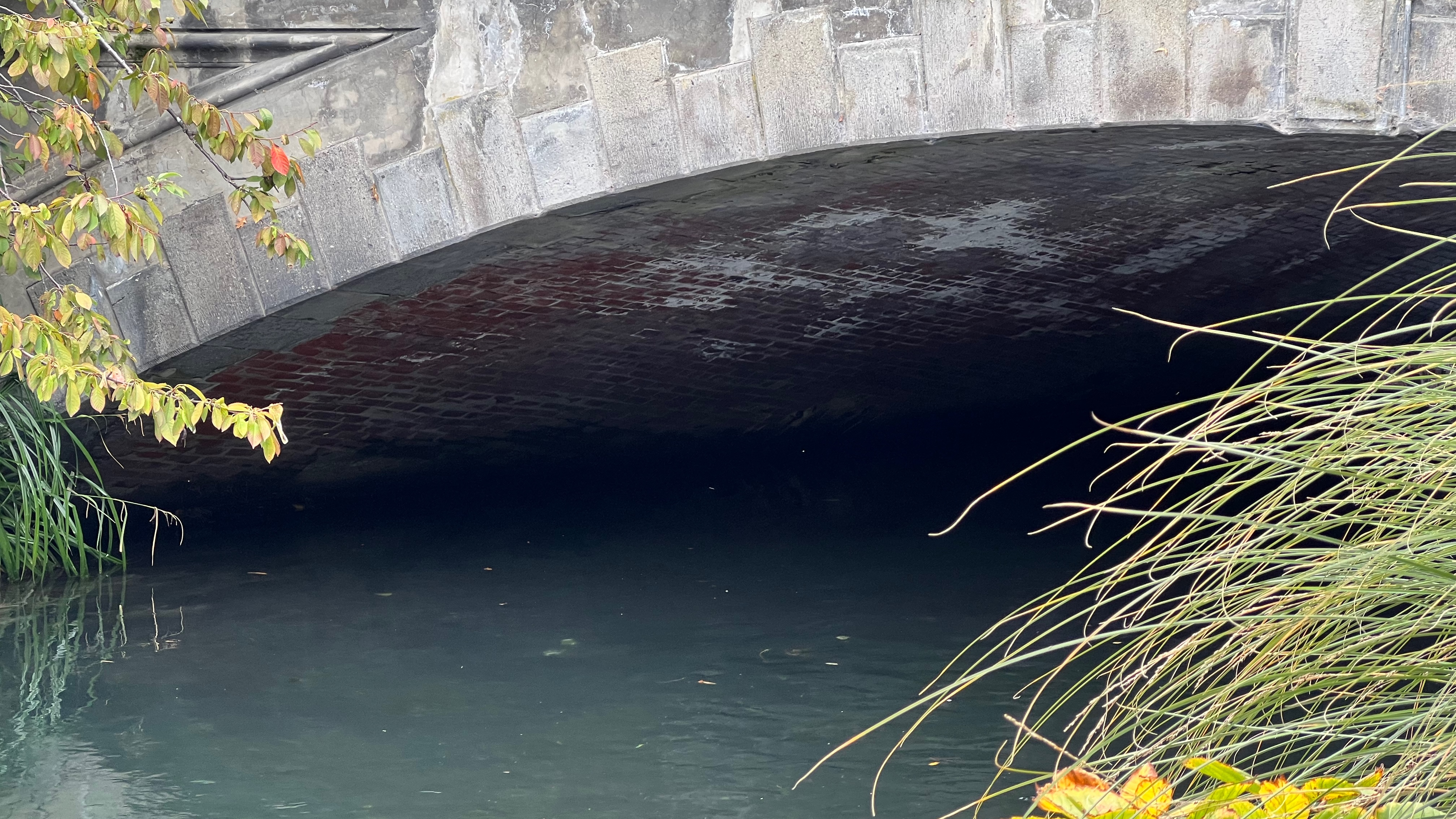
The original brickwork arch was repaired in 2016

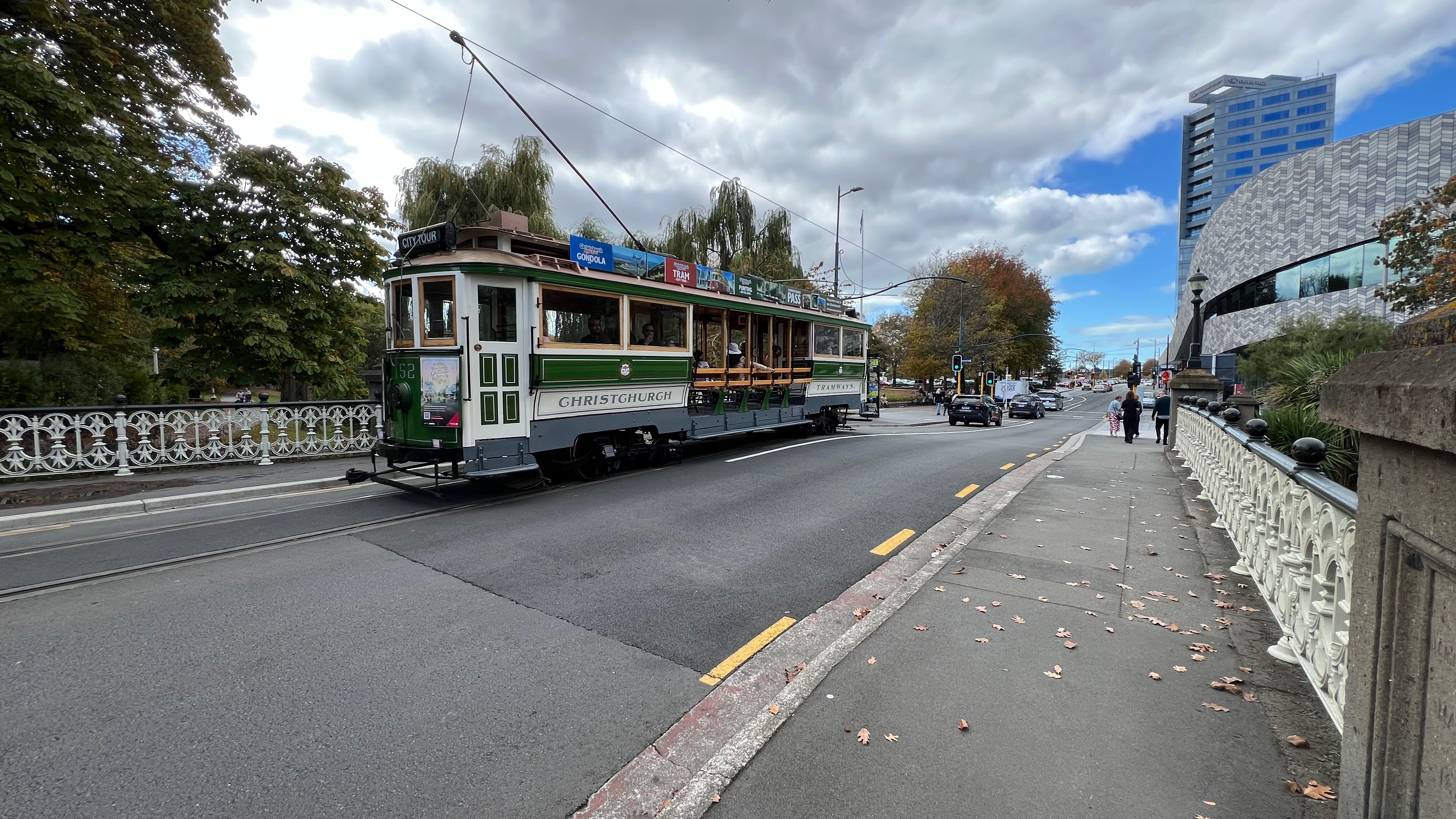
Trams began running across the bridge in the 1990s

Like many of the other 19th century bridges in central Christchurch, the Armagh Street bridge features ornate cast-iron balustrades. It is an arch bridge with a span of 12.2 metres (40 ft), made of six layers of clay bricks, with a stone façade quarried from Hoon Hay. It features eight ornamental stone pillars on either side of the concrete abutments, both at the beginning of the span and the points where the abutments end. The four inner pillars are topped with lamp posts. The architecture of the bridge is considered neo-Gothic, much like other similar public constructions in Christchurch from this period. An architectural detail is the stone pillar with etching, "J.G. Ruddenklau Mayor 1883", which commemorates the city's Mayor when the bridge under construction.
