= Charles Hulbert (writer) =

English businessman and writer (1778 – 1857)

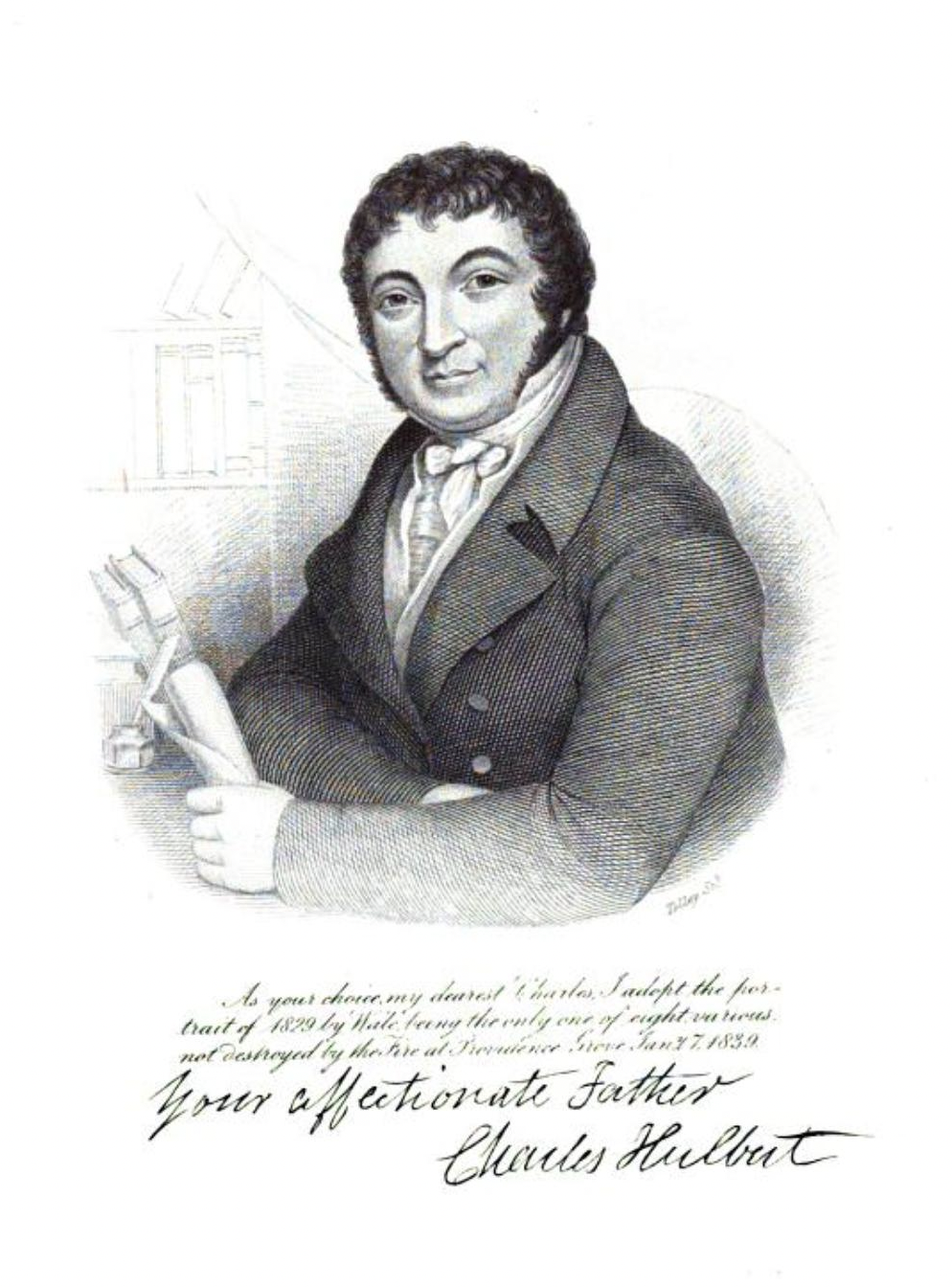
- The only surviving portrait of 8 following a fire at his home.
- Born: Charles Hulbert; 18 February 1778; Hulbert Green, Cheadle, Cheshire.
- Died: 7 October 1857 (aged 79); Providence Grove, Hadnall, Shropshire.
- Occupation: Businessman
- Spouse: Anna Wood (m. 1805)
- Children: Charles Augustus Hulbert; 2 others

Charles Hulbert (February 18, 1778 – October 9, 1857) was an English businessman and writer.

== Life ==
The son of Thomas Hulbert of Hulbert Green, near Cheadle, Cheshire, he was born in Manchester on 18 February 1778, and educated at the grammar school of Halton, Cheshire.

After learning cotton-weaving he became manager, at the age of twenty-two, of a large print works at Middleton, near Manchester, and subsequently began business with his elder brother at Swinton, also near Manchester. In 1803, he moved to Shrewsbury, and in conjunction with others leased some large factories at Coleham on the outskirts of the town.

He applied, but unsuccessfully, for ordination in the Church of England. He entered into Sunday school and other religious work, carrying on classes and services at the factory. He became acquainted with the Shropshire Methodist Circuit and guest-preached at Wellington, Madeley and Coalbrookdale. He assisted Joseph Lancaster in building one of his Lancasterian schools in Shrewsbury.

At the request of William Wilberforce and Henry Grey Bennet (who was then Shrewsbury's local Member of Parliament) in 1808 he drew up a report on the management of factories, as an answer to a claim made in parliament that manufactories were hotbeds of vice. Soon afterwards he declined an offer to move to St. Petersburg, made to him, it is said, by an agent of the emperor of Russia.

In 1813, his business as a cotton manufacturer having fallen off, he opened a bookshop and printing-office at Shrewsbury, where he published the Salopian Magazine (1815–17), and printed many small books, most of them written by himself. He also traded as an auctioneer. In 1825 he gave up the lease of the factory, returning it to its builder John Carline.

In 1827 he built a house at Hadnall, near Shrewsbury, which he called 'Providence Grove,' and here he continued to print and publish his writings. His house burned down, and his large library was destroyed, on 7 January 1839; but he was able by a public subscription and a grant from the Royal Literary Fund, to rebuild his residence and to purchase an annuity. He died there after a stroke on 7 October 1857 aged 79, and was buried at the parish church in Hadnall, where his epitaph speaks of "a diversified and uesful (sic) life".

== Works ==
His works include:

- Candid Strictures ... on Thoughts on the Protestant Ascendency, Shrewsbury, 1807.
- Memoir of General Lord Hill, 1816.
- African Traveller, 1817.
- Museum of the World, 1822-6, 4 vols.
- Christian Memoirs, 1832.
- Religions of Britain.
- History of Salop, 1837.
- Cheshire Antiquities, 1838.
- Manual of Shropshire Biography, &c., 1839.
- The Sunday Reader and Preacher, 1839–42.
- Biographical Sketches, 1842.
- Memoirs of Seventy Years of an Eventful Life, 1848–52. Of this autobiography he published an abridgment entitled The Book of Providences and the Book of Joys, 1857.

== Family ==
In 1805 he married Anna, daughter of Thomas Wood, proprietor of the Shrewsbury Chronicle. His eldest son, Charles Augustus Hulbert (1804–1888), was also a writer, and instrumental in the restoration of Almondbury Church. Two other sons and a daughter predeceased him.
