= Barbadoes Street Cemetery =

Cemetery in Christchurch, New Zealand

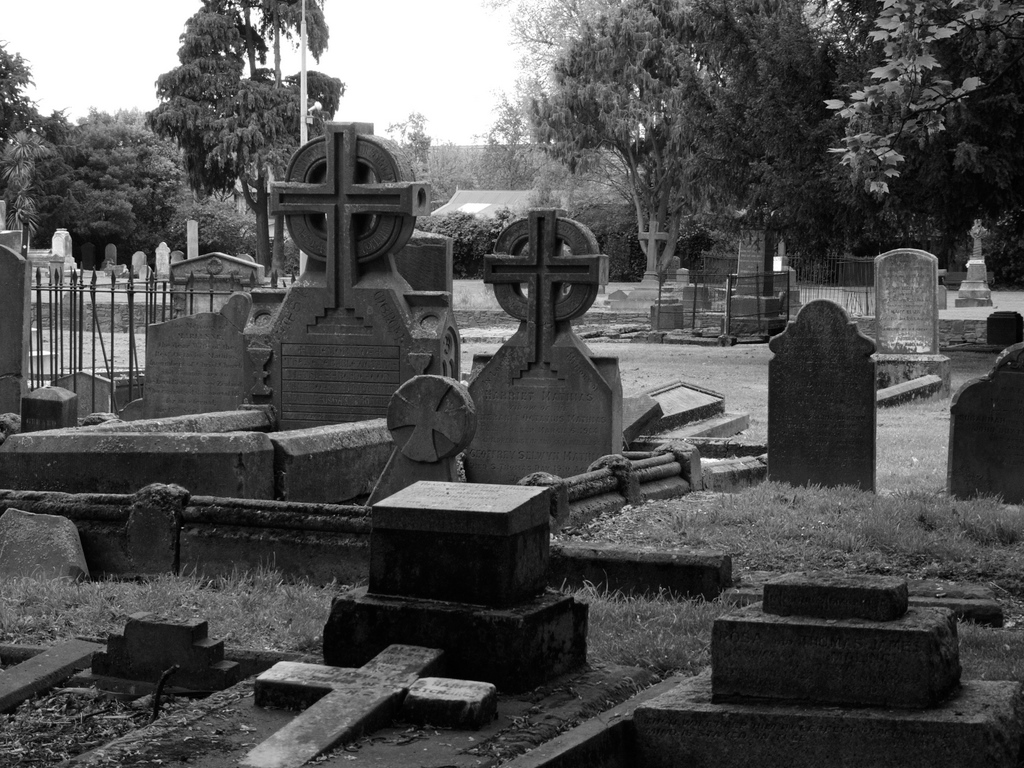
- The Barbadoes Street Cemetery in Christchurch in October 2010
- Interactive map of Barbadoes Street Cemetery

Details
- Established: 1851
- Location: Christchurch Central City
- Country: New Zealand
- Coordinates: 43°31′27″S 172°38′44″E
- Owned by: Christchurch City Council
- Website: Christchurch libraries entry for Barbadoes Street Cemetery
- Footnotes: cemeteries database

The Barbadoes Street Cemetery is the oldest cemetery in Christchurch, New Zealand. It was set up with three discrete areas for different denominations.

== Description ==
The cemetery was included in the original survey of Christchurch that was carried out in 1850. It was set up for three separate denominations:

- Reserve 20 was set aside for the Church of England; this was an area east of Barbadoes Street.
- Reserve 42 was set aside for Roman Catholics; this was an area west of Barbadoes Street.
- Reserve 43 was set aside for Dissenters; this was also an area west of Barbadoes Street and south of Reserve 42.

The Canterbury Provincial Council passed the Cemetery Reserves Management Ordinance, 1870. Based on this Ordinance, a Dissenters Cemetery Board was appointed in August 1871, comprising George Booth, George Gould (father of the businessman of the same name), James Jameson (who at the time of his appointment was Mayor of Christchurch), Francis James Garrick (a former member of the Provincial Council) and Thomas Abbott (a nurseryman).

== Burials ==
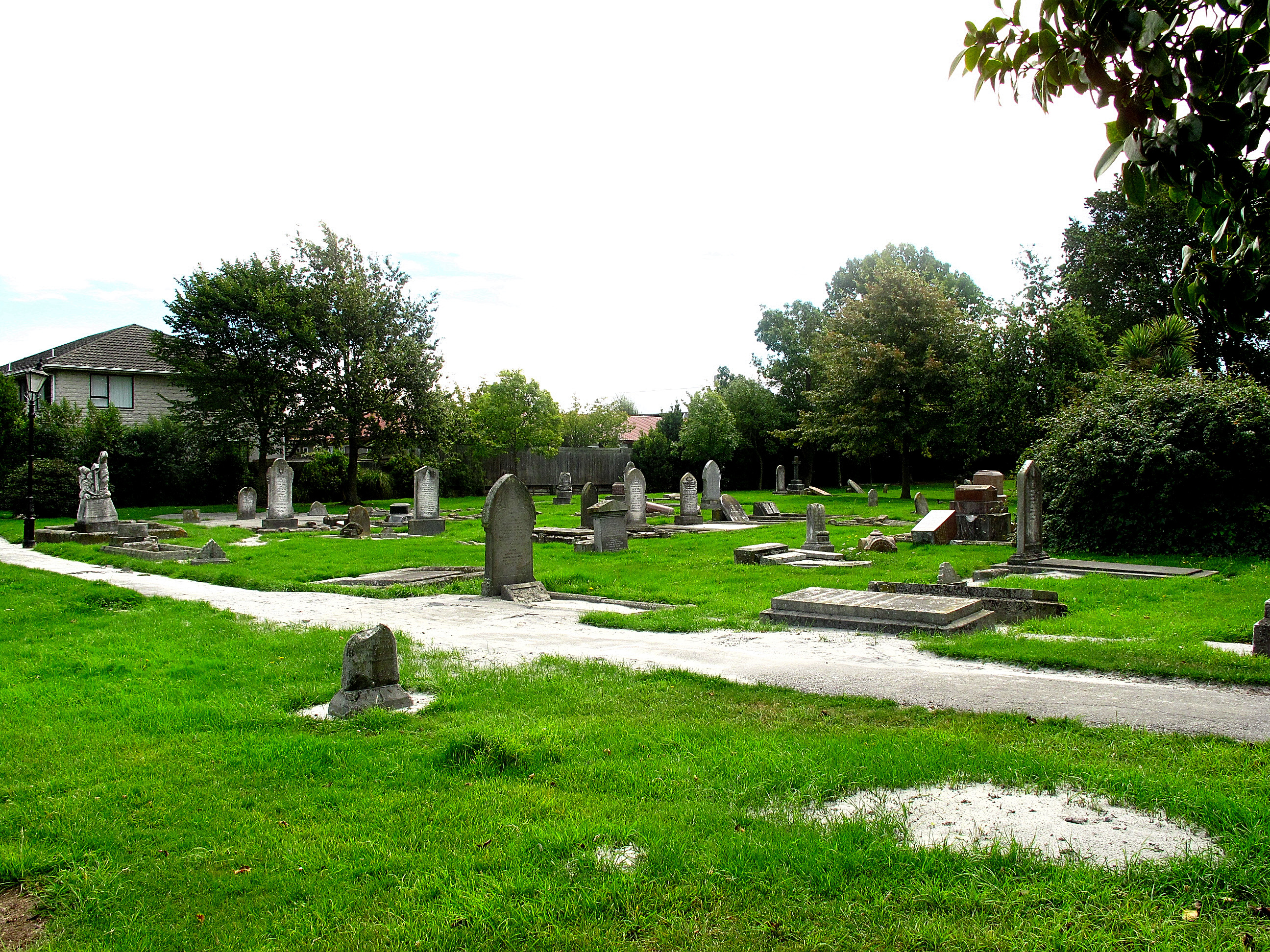
Liquefaction in Barbadoes Street Cemetery

Some of the notable people buried at the cemetery include:

- William Armson (1832/3–1883), architect
- Alfred Barker (1819–1873), doctor and photographer
- Lieutenant Colonel James Campbell (1787–1858), Commissioner of Crown Lands and Registrar of Deeds
- Thomas Cass (1817–1895), surveyor
- Joseph Colborne-Veel (1831–1895), editor of The Press and Canterbury educator
- Jane (1823–1911) and John Deans (1820–1854), pioneer settlers
- William John Warburton Hamilton (1825–1883), administrator, explorer, and politician
- Richard James Strachan Harman (1826–1902), civil engineer and part-owner of The Press
- Henry Harper (1804–1893), eminent Anglican Bishop
- Henry Jacobs (1824–1901), first Dean of Christchurch
- Thomas Joynt (1830–1907), senior member of the legal profession in New Zealand
- Felix Wakefield (1807–1875), engineer and Canterbury colonist

At least six members of parliament are buried at Barbadoes Street:

- James Temple Fisher (1828–1905), MP for Heathcote (1876–1881)
- Frederic Jones (1832–1890), MP for Heathcote (1887–1890)
- William Montgomery (c.1821–1914), MP for Akaroa (1874–1887)
- William Reeves (1825–1891), MP for Avon (1867–1868) and Selwyn (1871–1875)
- Henry Tancred (1816–1884), MP for Ashley (1867–1870)
- Henry Wynn-Williams (1828–1913), MP for Heathcote (1881–1884)

Six former Mayors of Christchurch are buried at the Barbadoes Street Cemetery:

- Henry Sawtell (1872–1873)
- Edward Bishop (1873–1874)
- Michael Hart (1874–1875)
- Charles Thomas Ick (1879–1881)
- George Ruddenklau (1882–1884)
- Samuel Manning (1890–1891)

Memorials, obelisks and headstones were damaged in the February 2011 Christchurch earthquake and silt from liquefaction covers part of the cemetery.

== See also ==
- List of cemeteries in New Zealand
