= Frederic Jones (politician) =

New Zealand politician

Hon Frederic Jones MP
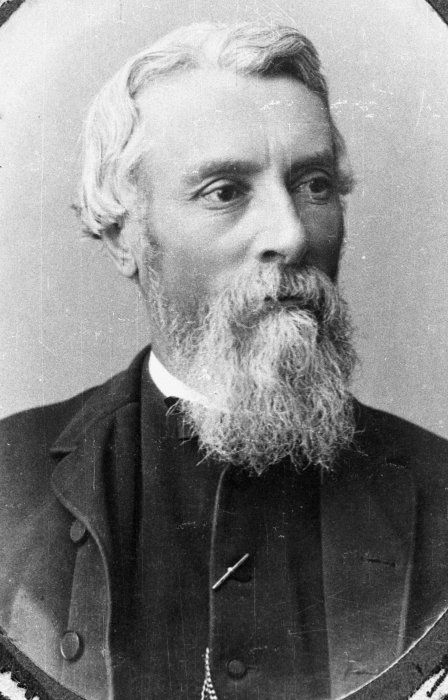

Member of the New Zealand Parliament for Heathcote
- In office 1887 – 8 September 1890
- Preceded by: John Coster
- Succeeded by: William Tanner

Personal details
- Born: 1832 Shropshire, England
- Died: 8 September 1890 (aged 57–58) Christchurch Central City, New Zealand

Frederic Jones (1832 – 8 September 1890) was a New Zealand politician. Originally from England, he settled in the colony in 1863 for health reasons.

== Early life ==
Jones was the third son of John Humphreys Jones, from the Shropshire region in England. He received his education from the Reverend G. Wharton, vicar of Kinver, and learned the trades of architecture and surveyor. He was employed by the architecture firm Haslam and Butler in London.

In January 1863, Jones arrived in Lyttelton with his brother T. D. Jones on the Chariot of Fame. His second brother, John Humphreys, remained in Dalston, London. The main reason for emigration was to improve his health by a change of climate.

Jones was for several years employed in the office of the builder Jenkins, and he worked in the office of Messrs W. Montgomery and Co after that. Jenkins, Jones and a Mr Innes started a flax mill in Kaiapoi, but the business failed. The site was later occupied by the Kaiapoi Woollen Manufacturing Company.

== Political career ==
Jones held numerous offices in local government, and was later described as the foremost expert in the country on local government matters.

He was a member of the Heathcote Road Board, including its chairman. In 1880, he was chosen to represent the Heathcote district on the South Waimakariri Board of Conservators, which later became the South Waimakariri River Board. For some time, he chaired the board and retired from it in December 1887, owing to his parliamentary workload. In January 1882, he was chosen as the Heathcote Road Board representative on the Drainage Board, but he resigned from that role in May of that year.

In 1881, he was elected onto the Selwyn County Council as the representative for the Heathcote riding, and remained a councillor until his death. His main contributions were a principal part in organising the Halswell drainage scheme and securing the Cashmere Hills domain as a public reserve. From 1883 until his death, he was the chairman of the board that administered this domain. He was appointed in 1885 by the Selwyn County Council as their representative on the Hospital Board, and on the Charitable Aid Board, the latter of which he chaired in 1886–87. At the time of his death, he was chairman of the Hospital Board.

=== Member of Parliament ===
New Zealand Parliament
Years	Term	Electorate	Party
1887–1887	9th	Heathcote	Independent
1887–1890	10th	Heathcote	Independent

The death on 17 December 1886 of John Coster, who represented the Heathcote electorate in parliament, caused the February 1887 Heathcote by-election. There were several people interested in standing in the electorate, including the former Heathcote MP Henry Wynn-Williams, but with Jones and the current Mayor of Christchurch, Aaron Ayers considered as the only contenders of having a chance of success, most other candidates withdrew from the contest. On nomination day on 2 February 1887, Jones and Ayers were nominated. A third person, James Arthur Williams, nominated himself, but could not find anybody to second this motion. Thus, the by-election was a two-person contest. On election day, 8 February 1887, the majority opinion was that Ayers would win. There was great interest in the election, as evidenced by the high turnout. Jones had a considerable majority over Ayers, with 527 and 336 votes, respectively. The 191 votes majority was mirrored by Jones having won all four polling stations.

At the 26 September 1887 general election, Jones and J. H. Hopkins were nominated. Hopkins was an active supporter of Jones for the by-election some seven months earlier and had proposed him at the 2 February nomination meeting, but had developed policy differences with regards to the economic recession. Jones and Hopkins received 756 and 309 votes, respectively. Hence, the majority for Jones was 447 votes, and he was elected to the 10th Parliament.

Jones was a first cousin of Edward Wingfield Humphreys, who represented the Christchurch North electorate in 1889–90.

== Death ==
Jones died on 8 September 1890 after several months of illness at his home in Lichfield Street, Christchurch Central City. On the day of his death, the House of Representatives adjourned their meeting for almost five hours out of respect for the deceased member. He was buried at the Barbadoes Street Cemetery on 10 September.

As his death was close to the next general election, which was held in December 1890, there was no by-election for the vacant seat. The Heathcote electorate was won by William Tanner.

New Zealand Parliament
Preceded by John Coster	Member of Parliament for Heathcote; 1887–90	Succeeded by William Tanner
