= John Cracroft Wilson =

New Zealand politician (1808–1881)

Sir John Cracroft Wilson KCSI CB
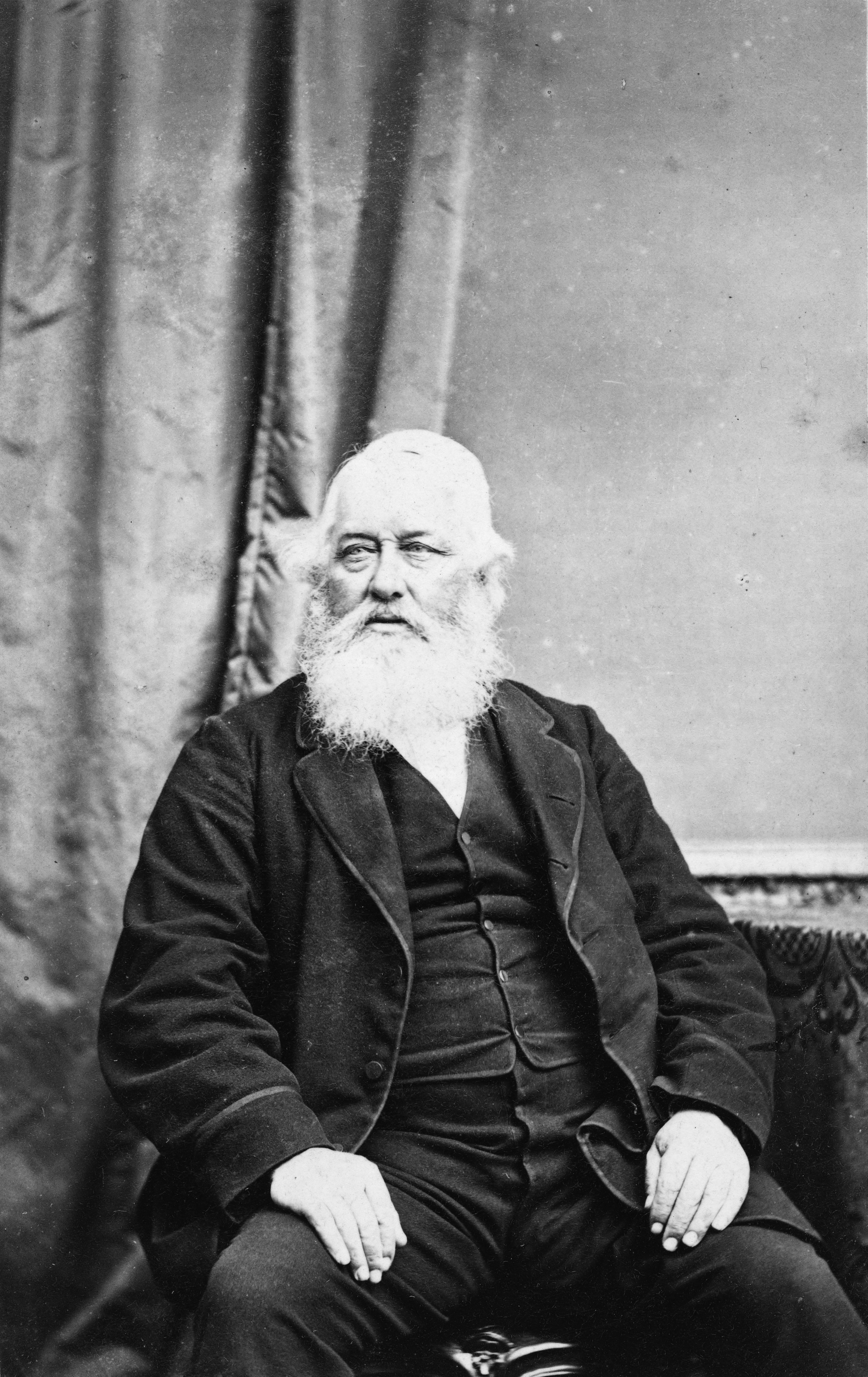

Member of the New Zealand Parliament for City of Christchurch
- In office 1861–1866
- Preceded by: Henry Sewell
- Succeeded by: James FitzGerald

Member of the New Zealand Parliament for Coleridge
- In office 1866–1870
- Preceded by: new constituency
- Succeeded by: John Karslake Karslake

Member of the New Zealand Parliament for Heathcote
- In office 1872–1875
- Preceded by: John Hall
- Succeeded by: James Temple Fisher

Personal details
- Born: 21 May 1808 Onamore, India
- Died: 2 March 1881 (aged 72) Cashmere, New Zealand
- Spouses: Elizabeth (née Wall); Jane Torie (née Greig)
- Relations: William Wilson (uncle); Alexander Cracroft Wilson (son); Walter Cracroft Wilson (son); Logan Campbell (son-in-law); Mary Grigg (granddaughter)
- Children: 8 (Laura, William, Emma, Frederick, Constance, Alexander, Laura, and Walter) from first marriage
- Occupation: civil servant; farmer; politician

Sir John Cracroft Wilson KCSI CB (21 May 1808 – 2 March 1881), also known as Nabob Wilson, was a British-educated civil servant in India, farmer and politician in New Zealand.

== Early life ==
John Cracroft Wilson was born in Onamore, India, the son of Alexander Wilson FRS, a judge in the Madras Civil Service and a noted botanist, and Elizabeth Clementina Wilson (née Cracroft). His mother was from a long established family—the Cracrofts of Hackthorn Hall in Lincolnshire. Her family name was given to him as a second Christian name, a custom that has been followed by the family ever since; they are thus known as the Cracroft Wilsons.

He was educated at Haileybury College and Brasenose College, Oxford. He returned to India in 1828 and entered the Bengal Civil Service as a cadet, advancing to become a magistrate. Advancing to the rank of assistant commissioner to William Sleeman, he was assigned to the Doab region in 1832 where he investigated men who were accused of thuggee.

He married Elizabeth (née Wall), probably on 4 November 1828 at Westminster, or Brixton, Surrey. His wife died in 1843 in Moradabad after giving birth to their eighth child. He was married again, on 12 October 1844, to Jane Torie Greig in Bareilly near Moradabad. There were no children from this second marriage.

== Australia and New Zealand ==
In 1853 his health broke down and he was ordered to convalesce in a cooler climate. He wanted to find a country suitable for the retirement of employees of the East India Company. Accordingly, he sailed to Australia on the Queen with his wife, daughter Emma, many servants, stock and exotic livestock. He did not like Australia, but met Alfred Cox, who was buying sheep for his next venture in the Canterbury region of New Zealand. Wilson decided to also go to Canterbury, and, after purchasing sheep and cattle in Sydney, took them to Lyttelton in the Akbar. After a disastrous journey where much of his stock died and 1,200 sheep had to be jettisoned, he arrived on 8 April 1854. His stock was transferred to the nearby Gollans Bay (the bay in Lyttelton Harbour beneath Evans Pass), where he lost more stock to tutu poisoning and cold southerly winds. His party made its way over the Port Hills via the Bridle Path. He took up 108 hectares (1.08 km^{2}) of land on the other side of the Port Hills and named the farm Cashmere (now a suburb of Christchurch) after Kashmir in India. He leased three more runs further away from Christchurch which he named Broadlands, High Peaks, and Cracroft. The run at Cracroft, near Hinds, was at 20,392 hectares (203.92 km^{2}) the second largest in Canterbury. At his Cashmere station, he built a house with 11 rooms and several farm buildings. Wilson left Lyttelton on 19 December 1844 on the Waterwitch for India, and the following year, his eldest son arrived to take over the management of the properties.

His wife and daughter followed him later, and did not arrive in Moradabad before 1857. His daughter Emma met John Logan Campbell on the journey; they married on 25 February 1858 at Meerut, NWP India; they lived in Europe then in Auckland, New Zealand.

== Service in India ==
Wilson arrived in India in May 1855. During the Indian Rebellion of 1857, he secured special powers from the Lieutenant-Governor and acted to prevent the spread of disaffection. His intervention was so effective that, after the Mutiny, Lord Canning, the Viceroy, recommended him for a distinction

because he has the enviable distinction of having, by his obstinate courage and perseverance, saved more Christian lives than any man in India … at the repeatedly imminent peril of his own life.

In May 1860, Queen Victoria appointed him a Companion of the Order of the Bath (CB) and, in 1872 Cracroft Wilson was offered, and accepted, the rank of Knight Commander (KCSI) of the Order of the Star of India.

== Later life in New Zealand ==
New Zealand Parliament
Years	Term	Electorate	Party
1861–1866	3rd	Christchurch	Independent
1866–1870	4th	Coleridge	Independent
1872–1875	5th	Heathcote	Independent

After he returned to New Zealand in 1859 Cracroft Wilson was elected to the House of Representatives for the electorates of City of Christchurch (1861–1866), Coleridge (1866–1870), and Heathcote (1872–1875).

At the end of the 1866–1870 term, Cracroft Wilson retired from the Coleridge electorate due to an 'unfortunate accident' that he had suffered. On 30 July 1872, he was elected unopposed in a by-election to represent Heathcote following the resignation by John Hall, who had accepted a position in the Legislative Council. In the 1875–1876 general election, held on 4 January 1876 in the Heathcote electorate, Cracroft Wilson was defeated by James Temple Fisher.

He was for some years Chairman of the Public Petitions Committee. He was a forceful and, at times, provocative debater. During the 1860s, when Māori affairs were frequently before the House, Cracroft Wilson drew freely on his Indian experiences to reinforce his arguments. He strongly urged the use of Gurkha troops as the most effective means of bringing the war to a speedy and successful conclusion.

He represented Ashburton on the Canterbury Provincial Council from May 1862 to May 1866 and Heathcote from March to July 1871, and again from April 1874 to abolition of the Provinces in October 1876. He was on the Canterbury Executive Council from 15 April 1875 until its abolition, and during its last session (April to June 1875), he was its president. In addition he served on numerous local bodies and was a keen member of the Canterbury Acclimatisation Society. He was an early member of the Canterbury Jockey Club and helped Cass to select the site of the racecourse. He commanded the Canterbury Yeomanry Cavalry, was a patron of opera and drama, a governor of Canterbury College, and a diocesan synodsman. As a farmer, he imported pedigree sheep, principally Lincolns, and founded a stud flock.

Cracroft Wilson died at Cashmere, Christchurch, on 2 March 1881. He was survived by his wife and four of his children (Frederick, Alexander, Emma and Constance). Alexander and his younger brother Walter both played first-class cricket in New Zealand for Canterbury. Walter drowned in 1865 at the age of 22.

During World War II, the military commandeered the Cracroft Wilson estate, founded by Cracroft Wilson in 1854, for their Southern Group headquarters, and secret work on the Cracroft Caverns underneath the house began in 1942.

== Notes ==
New Zealand Parliament
Preceded by Henry Sewell	Member of Parliament for Christchurch; 1861–1866	Succeeded by James FitzGerald
New constituency	Member of Parliament for Coleridge; 1866–1870	Succeeded by John Karslake Karslake
Preceded by John Hall	Member of Parliament for Heathcote; 1872–1876	Succeeded by James Fisher
