= William Tanner (politician) =

New Zealand politician

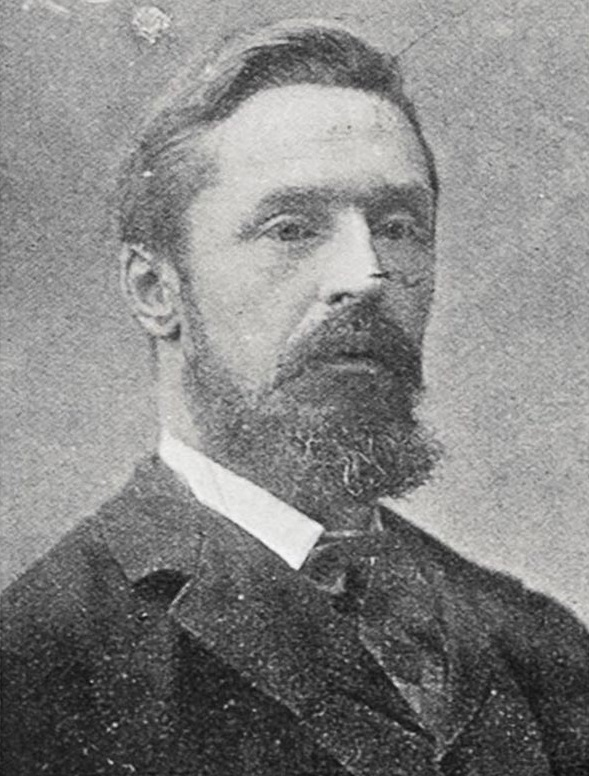

Member of the New Zealand Parliament for Avon
- In office 20 December 1893 – 2 December 1908
- Preceded by: Edwin Blake
- Succeeded by: George Russell

Member of the New Zealand Parliament for Heathcote
- In office 5 December 1890 – 20 December 1893
- Preceded by: Frederic Jones
- Succeeded by: electorate abolished

Personal details
- Born: 1851 Northamptonshire, England
- Died: 1938 (aged 86–87)
- Party: Liberal (1905 onward)
- Children: Walter Tanner

William Wilcox Tanner (1851–1938) was a New Zealand politician of the Liberal Party. In 1905 he was associated with the New Liberal Party group.

== Early life ==
William Tanner was born in Moulton, Northamptonshire, England, in 1851. In 1877 he married a daughter of Mr. J. Browett of London. They came to New Zealand in 1879 on the Waitara. He worked as a boot maker in both England and New Zealand.

== Political career ==
New Zealand Parliament
Years	Term	Electorate	Party
1890–1893	11th	Heathcote	Liberal–Labour
1893–1896	12th	Avon	Liberal–Labour
1896–1899	13th	Avon	Liberal–Labour
1899–1902	14th	Avon	Liberal–Labour
1902–1905	15th	Avon	Liberal–Labour
1905–1908	16th	Avon	Liberal

William Tanner represented the Christchurch seats of Heathcote from 1890 to 1893 and then Avon from 1893 to 1908, when he was defeated.

Among the radical policies that Tanner approved of were-the nationalisation of land, periodic revaluation of Crown leaseholds, and the establishment of a state bank.

He was a member of the Woolston Municipal Council (1893–1900), Canterbury Hospital Board (1911–14), and Secretary to the Bootmakers' Union of Christchurch. Tanner was considered to be "the first Labour candidate" to be elected to the New Zealand House of Representatives in 1890 when he was successful in the Heathcote electorate.

Tanner was described by the Lyttelton Times in 1902 as: "Methodical, studious, always ready to refer to statistics, records and a terror for detail" (Lyttelton Times, 18 October 1902, p. 4). The Christchurch Press said of him: "Nice voice, speaks slowly with a precision almost painful...Hard-working, intelligent, industrious and no reason to doubt his honesty".

== Family ==
Tanner died in 1938. His son Walter Tanner was the second Chief Censor of Films in New Zealand.

New Zealand Parliament
Preceded by Frederic Jones	Member of Parliament for Heathcote; 1890–93	Electorate abolished
Preceded by Edwin Blake	Member of Parliament for Avon; 1893–1908	Succeeded by George Russell
