= 1863 Heathcote by-election =

New Zealand by-election

The 1863 Heathcote by-election was a by-election held on 28 October in the Heathcote electorate during the 3rd New Zealand Parliament.

The by-election was caused by the resignation of the incumbent, William Sefton Moorhouse.

He was replaced by Alfred Cox.

As Cox was the only candidate, he was declared elected unopposed.
