= James Temple Fisher =

New Zealand politician (1828–1905)

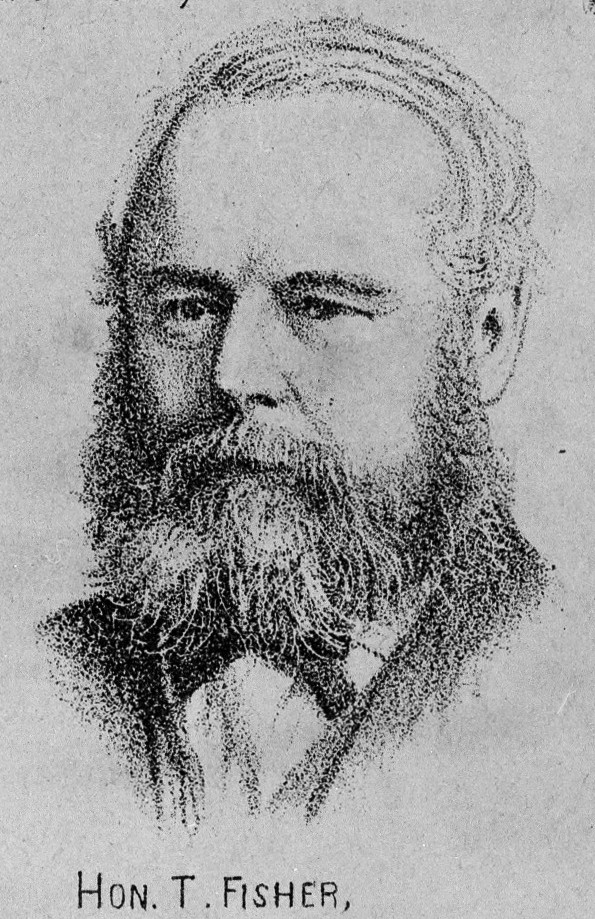
James Fisher in 1877

James Temple Fisher (1828 – 3 January 1905) was a 19th-century Member of Parliament from Canterbury, New Zealand.

Fisher arrived in New Zealand on the Charlotte Jane, one of the First Four Ships.

He represented the Heathcote electorate from 1876 to 1881, when he was defeated.

He was Postmaster-General and Commissioner of Telegraphs in the Grey Ministry, from 15 October 1877 to 8 October 1879.

He died on 3 January 1905 at his home in south Colombo Street in the Heathcote district. He is buried at Barbadoes Street Cemetery.

New Zealand Parliament
Years	Term	Electorate	Party
1876–1879	6th	Heathcote	Independent
1879–1881	7th	Heathcote	Independent

Political offices
Preceded by George McLean	Postmaster-General and Commissioner of Telegraphs; 1877–1879	Succeeded by John Hall
New Zealand Parliament
Preceded by John Cracroft Wilson	Member of Parliament for Heathcote; 1876–1881	Succeeded by Henry Wynn-Williams
