= Wynn Williams & Co =

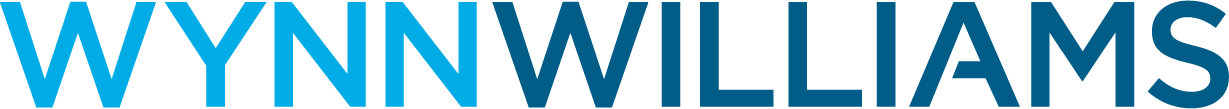
No. of offices / 2; No. of lawyers / 50+; No. of staff / c.100; Major practice areas / All; Key People: Philip Maw / Managing Partner; Hayley Buckley / Chair of the Board; Matthew Jones / COO; Date founded / 1859; Website / www.wynnwilliams.co.nz

Wynn Williams, previously Wynn Williams & Co is a mid-sized law firm in New Zealand with approximately 100 staff. It has offices in Auckland and Christchurch and offers the full suite of legal services through five national teams.

== History ==
Founded by Harry Bell Johnstone in January 1859, it claims to be Christchurch's first law firm. Henry Wynn-Williams joined the practice in July 1860. and when Johnstone ceased to practice in 1864, Wynn-Williams, whose name the company now bears, remained with the firm until 1912.

In 2012 the firm opened an office in Auckland.

== Notable alumni ==
In the last 50 years it has produced four High Court Judges and one Supreme Court Judge, Andrew Tipping, a remarkable contribution from a small number of partners. Recent departures include Peter Whiteside QC and Justice Gerald Nation.

== About ==
Wynn Williams is a founding member of the Lawlink Group, a national network of 18 independent law firms and over 420 lawyers. In 2007 Wynn Williams was invited to join State Capital Group as its sole New Zealand member. This is the largest network of independent law firms in the world, comprising over 140 firms, which provides its clients with access to known and trusted expert advisers, anywhere in the world.

== Rankings and awards ==
Wynn Williams is regularly recognised and recommended by the global legal directories Legal 500 and Chambers & Partners. In 2017 it was the winner of the Managing Partner of the Year, Employer of Choice and Private Practice Lawyer of the year at the NZ Law Awards.
