= Cracroft Caverns =

Cave in New Zealand

- Cashmere
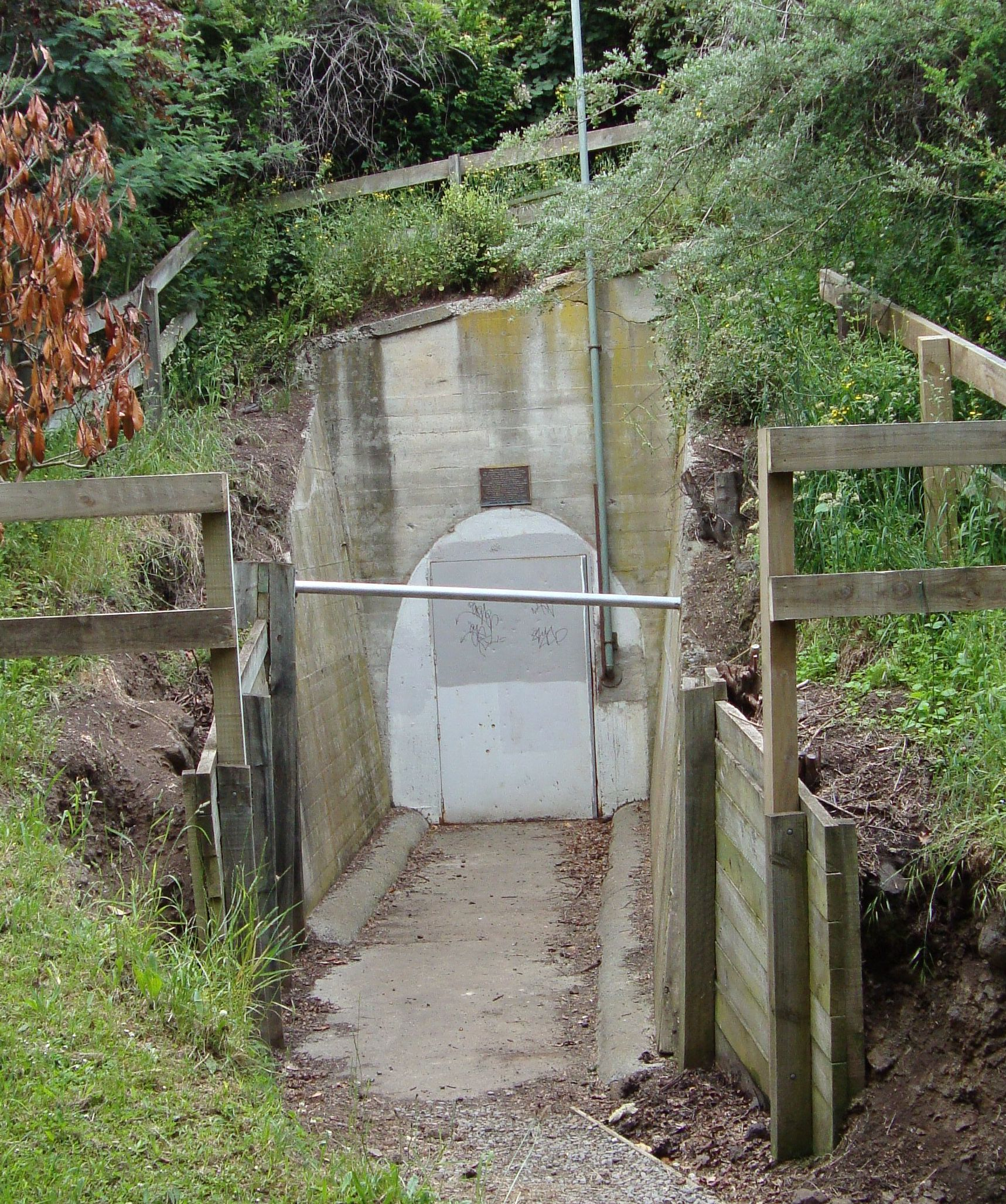
- Entrance to Cracroft Caverns

Site information
- Controlled by: Christchurch City Council
- Open to the public: No

Location
- Coordinates: 43°34′28″S 172°37′23″E

Site history
- Built: 1942

Cracroft Caverns, also known as the Cashmere Caverns, are a series of large chambers in the hill of the Cashmere suburb of Christchurch, New Zealand.

Constructed secretly during the Second World War in response to the Japanese threat, they were intended to house operational headquarters in the event of attack. The military commandeered the Cracroft Wilson estate, founded by Sir John Cracroft Wilson in 1854, for their Southern Group headquarters, and work on the tunnels began in 1942.

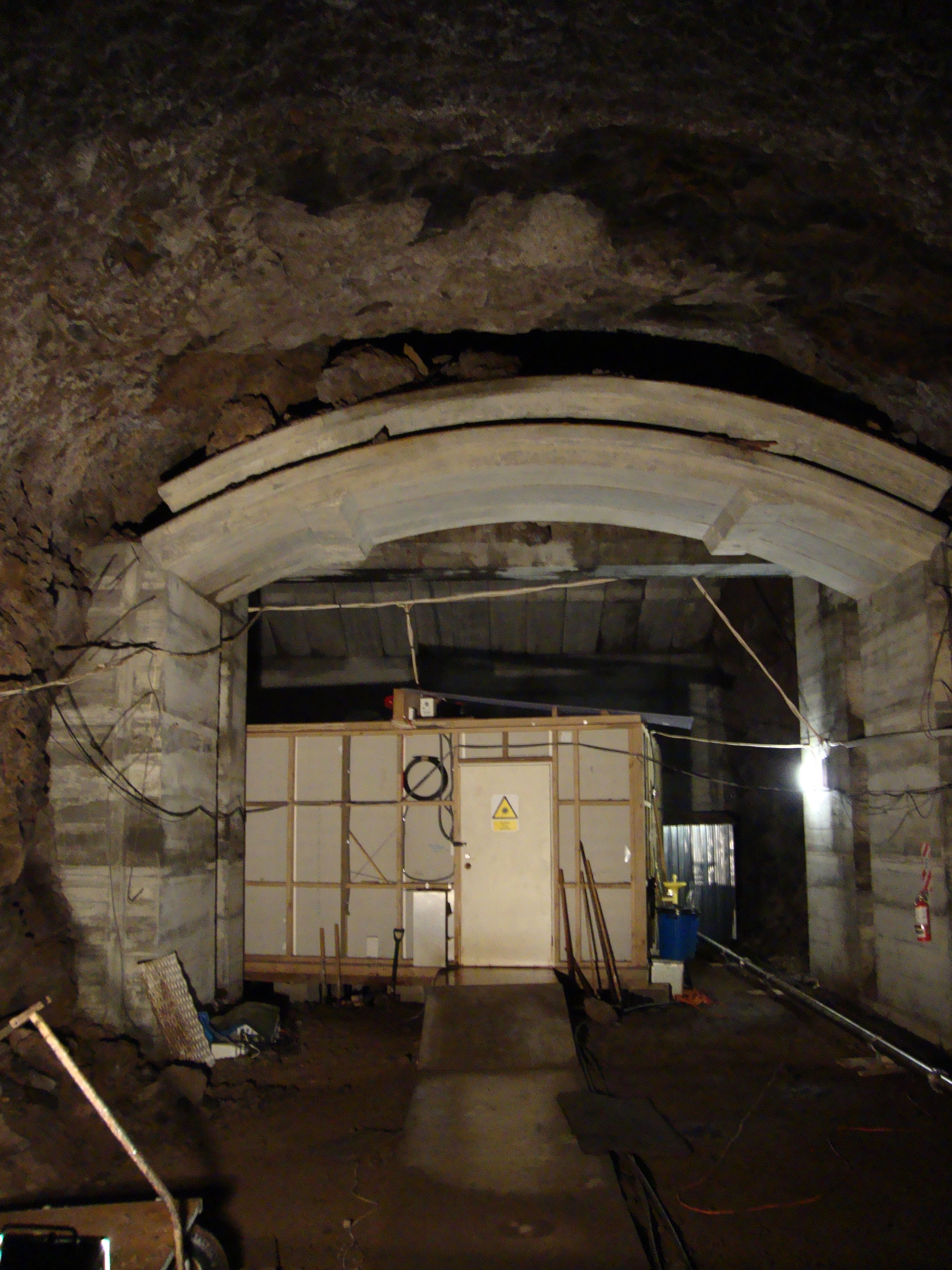
Partially lined cavern (notice the rocks above the concrete ceiling) and ring laser equipment

Railways were built for access and for the removal of waste soil. The largest cavern was 7 metres high, 10 metres wide and 30 metres long. Prestressed concrete was used to line the caverns. Officers based in the estate house would come down stairs into the tunnels, while others were to enter through the access tunnels. Construction came to a sudden halt in 1944 as the threat of invasion receded, even though work on the bunkers was nearly complete. The weekend before the military left the estate, fire broke out and the Cracroft Wilson House was burnt to the ground.

The entrances to the underground complex were sealed after the war, and the existence of the caverns was largely forgotten until 1987 when TVNZ reporter Jeff Field was told of the caverns during a chance conversation with a gardener at Cashmere Hospital. Using the archives at the Ministry of Defence, Field discovered references to the caverns in newspaper articles dating from January 1945. The investigation was assigned to another reporter, Bill Cockram, who contacted the owner of Cashmere House which had been rebuilt following the fire. With the permission of the owner, excavations were carried out and the caverns were entered for the first time since the end of the Second World War.

The caverns now became the home of a series of ring laser experiments set up by the University of Canterbury's physics department, taking advantage of the extremely stable temperature in the caves.

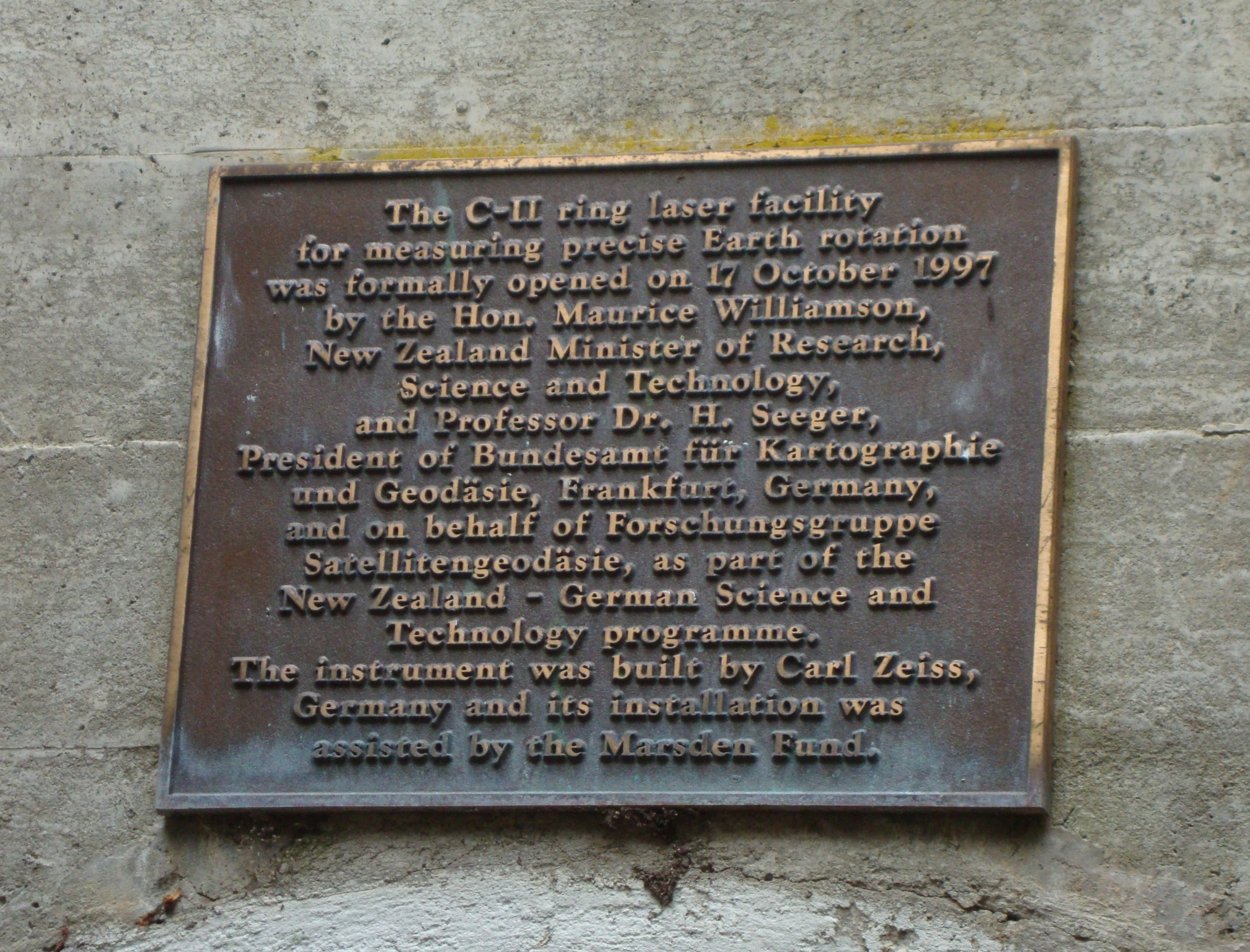
Plaque above the main entrance

There is now an associated small public park behind the Princess Margaret Hospital.

Parts of the caverns have periodically been opened to the public in the past, but due to damage from the 2010 Canterbury earthquake and 2011 Christchurch earthquakes there is currently no access.

== Sources ==
- Daisley, Simon (2016). "The Cashmere Caverns". Christchurch City Libraries. Christchurch.
