= Alexander Cracroft Wilson =

New Zealand cricketer (1840–1911)

Alexander Wilson
Personal information
- Full name: Alexander Cracroft Wilson
- Born: 5 March 1840; Cawnpore, Bengal Presidency, British India
- Died: 5 January 1911 (aged 70); Christchurch, New Zealand
- Relatives: John Cracroft Wilson (father); Walter Wilson (brother)

Domestic team information
- Years: Team
- 1877/78: Canterbury
- Source: Cricinfo, 22 October 2020

Alexander Cracroft Wilson (5 March 1840 – 5 January 1911) was a New Zealand banker, businessman, college administrator, and cricketer. He played in one first-class cricket match for Canterbury during the 1877–78 season.

Born at Cawnpore in British India in 1840, Wilson was the second youngest son of John Cracroft Wilson and his wife Elizabeth (née Wall). After being educated in England, in 1859 he moved to join his father, now remarried, at his Cashmere estate in New Zealand, travelling on the Cresswell.

In New Zealand, Wilson initially worked at the Bank of New Zealand when it opened at Christchurch in 1862. He managed the bank's branch at Lyttelton before retiring in 1871 and moving briefly to Auckland where he met his future wife Laura Munro, the daughter of a Native Land Court judge; the couple married in 1877. Later in the decade he went in to business at Christchurch, founding the merchant company Sawtell and Wilson with Henry Sawtell. He was a trustee of a building and investment company, secretary of the Canterbury Chamber of Commerce, on the board of the New Zealand Shipping Company, and was the Italian consul in Christchurch.

Wilson's only first-class cricket match was a December 1877 fixture against Auckland. Opening the batting, he scored 16 runs in Canterbury's first innings before being dismissed for two runs in their second. The following month he played a one-day match for the side against Wellington on the way back to Christchurch. His brother, Walter Cracroft Wilson, had played two first-class matches for the province in the 1860s before drowning in the Rakaia River in 1865.

In 1891 Wilson was appointed as registrar of Canterbury College in Christchurch. He oversaw an expansion of Christchurch public library, the library's collection doubling during his time in the role. (Note: Canterbury College operated the public library in Christchurch at this time, and Wilson's role as registrar meant that he was in effect the head public librarian, although the day to day work of the library was carried out by librarians.) He retired in 1908 as a result of failing health.

Wilson died in 1911 at the age of 70 after a period of illness which had confined him to his house. He had nine children, four of whom died as infants. Three sons and two daughters survived into adulthood, with two of his sons later being killed during World War I. His daughter, Rita Cracrift Wilson, was a notable golfer who won six championships at Christchurch Ladies' Golf Club between 1904 and 1924.
