= 1872 Heathcote by-election =

New Zealand by-election

- 30 July 1872

Heathcote electorate
- Registered: —
- Turnout: Unopposed
	First party
Candidate	John Cracroft Wilson
Party	Independent
Popular vote	Unopposed
Percentage	100%
MP before election
John Hall
Elected MP
John Cracroft Wilson

The 1872 Heathcote by-election was a by-election for the electorate of Heathcote during the 5th New Zealand Parliament, and resulted when the previous incumbent John Hall resigned.

Hall resigned on 19 July 1872 as he was appointed to the Legislative Council. On 22 July, John Cracroft Wilson advertised his candidacy for the position.

The nomination meeting was held at the Road Board office in Ferry Road.

There was no vote as Wilson was the only candidate, and he was declared elected when the writs closed for candidates on 30 July. Wilson had previously been in Parliament for the seat of Coleridge, but had retired in 1870 due to an "unfortunate accident".
