= Walter Wilson (cricketer) =

New Zealand cricketer (1843–1865)

Personal information
- Full name: Walter Cracroft Wilson
- Born: 5 April 1843; Moradabad, Bengal Presidency, British India
- Died: 9 June 1865 (aged 22); Rakaia River, New Zealand
- Relatives: John Cracroft Wilson (father); Alexander Cracroft Wilson (brother)

Domestic team information
- Years: Team
- 1863/64–1864/65: Canterbury
- Source: Cricinfo, 22 October 2020

Walter Cracroft Wilson (5 April 1843 – 9 June 1865) was a New Zealand cricketer. He played in two first-class matches for Canterbury, one in each of the 1863–64 and 1864–65 seasons.

Wilson was born at Moradabad in British India in 1843, the youngest son of John Cracroft Wilson and his wife Elizabeth (née Wall). After being educated at Rugby School in England he moved to join his father, now remarried, at his Cashmere estate in New Zealand.

Both of Wilson's first-class cricket matches were played against Otago and are the first two matches played in New Zealand to be awarded first-class status. He scored a total of seven runs in his four innings.

Wilson died in June 1865 at the age of 22. He was driving stock to his father's estate at Cashmere when he was thrown from his horse whilst attempting to cross the Rakaia River.
