= 1887 Heathcote by-election =

New Zealand by-election

The 1887 Heathcote by-election was a by-election held on 8 February in the Heathcote electorate during the 9th New Zealand Parliament.

The by-election was caused by the death of the incumbent, John Coster on 17 December 1886.

He was replaced by Frederic Jones.

His opponent Aaron Ayers, the Mayor of Christchurch was expected to win the election.

== Result ==
The following table gives the election result:

1887 Heathcote by-election
Party	Candidate	Votes	%	±%
Independent	Frederic Jones	527	61.07	
Independent	Aaron Ayers	336	38.93	
Majority		191	22.13	
Turnout		863		
