= Henry Wynn-Williams =

New Zealand lawyer and MP (1828–1913)

The Honourable Henry Wynn-Williams
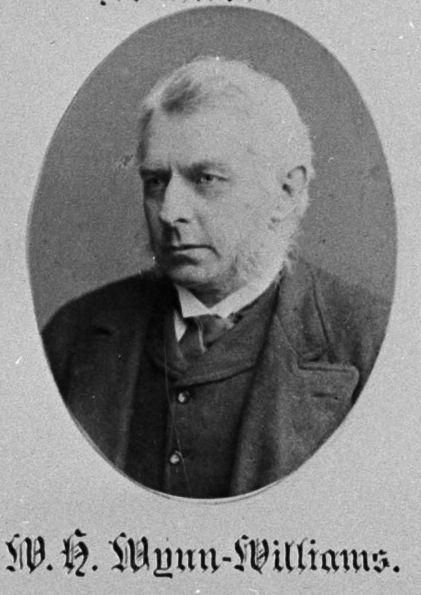
- Henry Wynn-Williams in 1882

Member of the New Zealand Parliament for Heathcote
- In office 1881–1884

Personal details
- Born: August 1828 Llansannan, Conwy, Wales
- Died: 27 October 1913 (aged 85) Christchurch, New Zealand
- Resting place: Barbadoes Street Cemetery
- Relations: Watkin Williams (brother)
- Occupation: lawyer

William Henry Wynn-Williams (1828 – 27 October 1913) was a Welsh-born, 19th-century Member of Parliament from Canterbury, New Zealand. He was a prominent lawyer in Christchurch.

== Early life ==
Wynn-Williams was born in August 1828 in Llangar, Conwy County Borough, North Wales.

His father was the rector Peter Williams, and his mother was Lydia Sophia Price. One of his brothers was Watkin Williams. The birth dates for William and Charles are uncertain, as they were apparently born in August and September 1828, respectively *Parish registers of Llangar show Watkin baptised in Sept 1827 & Henry in Sept 1828.

His brother Charles studied medicine initially, but changed to a law degree. William was educated in preparation for joining the Indian army, but then also studied law. After practising in Wales for two years, William emigrated to New Zealand, arriving in Wellington in 1856. He worked on farms in the South Island and settled in Christchurch in 1860.

== Professional career ==
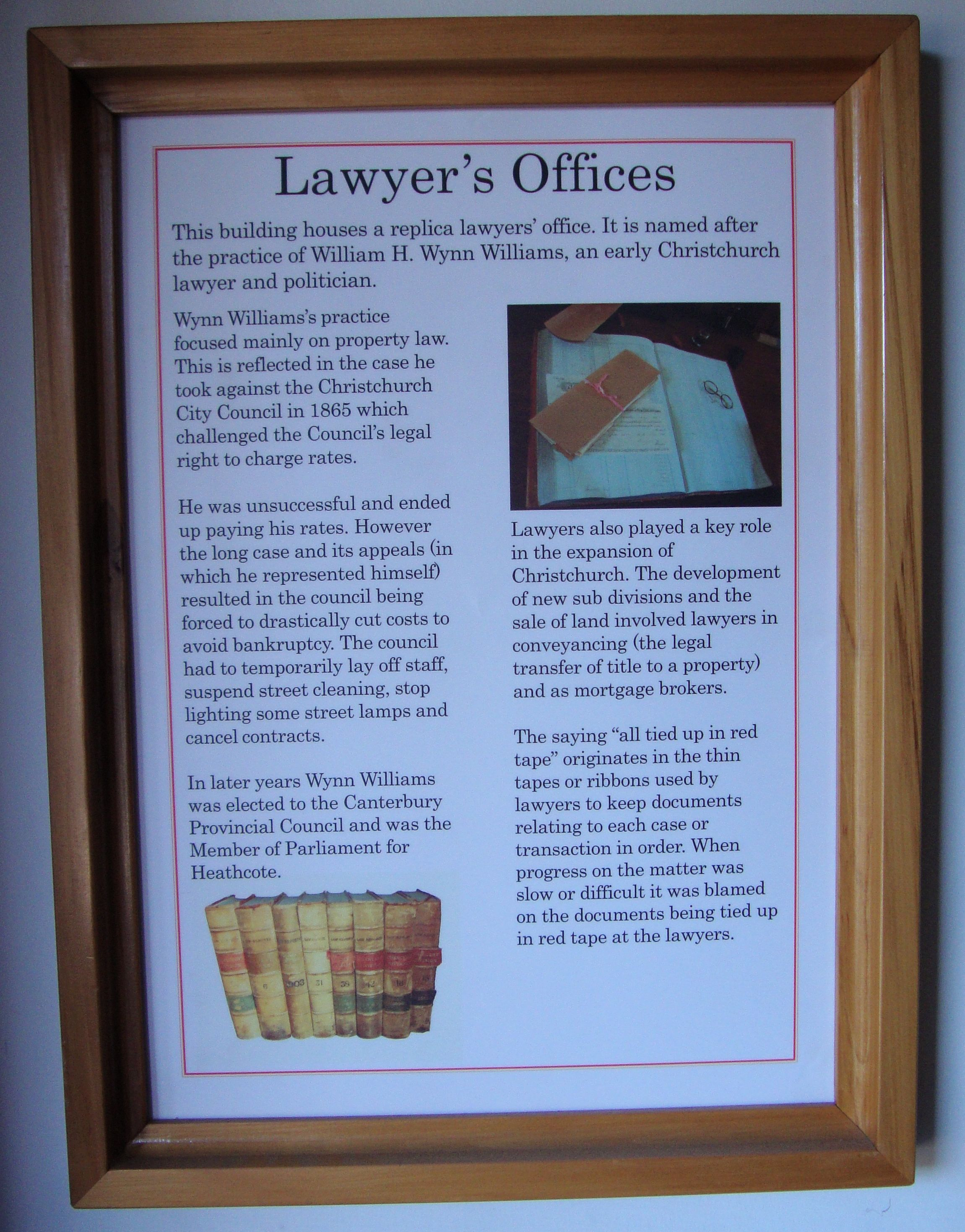
Information board at Ferrymead Heritage Park on Wynn-Williams

He began practising law in New Zealand in July 1860 when he joined the practice of Harry Bell Johnstone, who had started his legal firm in January 1859. Johnstone ceased to practice in 1864, but Wynn-Williams remained with the firm until 1912. The firm of Wynn Williams & Co still exists today.

He was involved in conveyancing, criminal trials and significant civil litigation. He is described as fearless and often represented the underdog.

== Political career ==
=== Political activism ===
George Allen was a leader of several protest groups. One such group, the Ratepayers' Mutual Protection Association, challenged the right of the Christchurch City Council to exist. Wynn-Williams was active with the group and took the case to court. Ratepayers started to withhold their rates, and in April 1866 the council was forced to drastically cut expenditure in order to fend off bankruptcy. Staff were laid off, street cleaning suspended, some streets no longer lit and contracts cancelled. In May 1866, the city drainage scheme was abandoned, a project that had been estimated to cost £160,000. A shipment of pipes that had just arrived from England was sold off, ensuring Christchurch's reputation as the most polluted and unhealthy city for another 20 years. Wynn-Williams eventually lost the lengthy case and left the Ratepayers' Mutual Protection Association, which then folded.

=== Provincial Council ===
Wynn-Williams was a member of the Canterbury Provincial Council from 1865 until the abolition of provincial government with one interruption. He represented Heathcote (July 1865 – May 1866), City of Christchurch (June 1866 – November 1870) and Papanui (October 1871 – June 1875).

=== Member of Parliament ===
New Zealand Parliament
Years	Term	Electorate	Party
1881–1884	8th	Heathcote	Independent

The 10 December 1881 general election in the Heathcote electorate was contested by the incumbent James Fisher, Wynn-Williams and Major Alfred Hornbrook. They received 119, 243 and 167 votes, respectively. Wynn-Williams was thus elected with a majority of 76 votes.

Wynn-Williams was an advocate of the working class. Although the Christchurch newspaper The Press was conservative and thus from the opposite end of the political spectrum than Wynn-Williams, they praised him in an editorial on 21 April 1883 for speaking his forthright opinion rather than following the attitude of other politicians of saying what the voters want to hear and what is popular with them:

It gives us a new and a delightful sensation to read the speech he made to his constituents at Woolston on Thursday evening so free it is from humbug or deception, and so vigorous with fearless candor.

His great-grandson, Robert Wynn-Williams, used the editorial as inspiration for the title of his biography.

The nominations for the 1884 general election in the Heathcote electorate took place on 16 July. The 22 July election was contested by the incumbent Wynn-Williams, John Coster and James Fisher. They received 245, 445 and 15 votes, respectively. Coster was thus, with a majority of 200 votes, elected to represent Heathcote in the 9th New Zealand Parliament.

== Community involvement ==
Wynn-Williams was on the council of the Canterbury Society of Arts, a group organising exhibitions of paintings. In 1881, he was vice-president of that organisation.

== Death ==
He died on 27 October 1913 and is buried at Barbadoes Street Cemetery.

== Bibliography ==
- Wynn-Williams, Robert (2013). Free from Humbug: The Life and Times of Henry Wynn Williams. ISBN 9780473226244.

New Zealand Parliament
Preceded by James Fisher	Member of Parliament for Heathcote; 1881–1884	Succeeded by John Coster
