= John Coster =

New Zealand politician (1838–1886)

New Zealand Parliament
Years	Term	Electorate	Party
1884–1886	9th	Heathcote	Independent

John Lewis Coster (1838 – 17 December 1886) was a 19th-century member of parliament from Christchurch, New Zealand. He was mostly known for his business interests.

== Biography ==
Coster was born in Exeter, and emigrated to Sydney at the age of 16. He quickly rose to leading positions and the management of the Union Bank of Australia sent him to Christchurch in March 1859. There, he transferred to the Bank of New Zealand and became manager of the branch in Christchurch. On Coster's initiative, the New Zealand Shipping Company was founded in 1873, and he was its managing executive for many years.

He represented the Heathcote electorate from 1884 to 1886, when he died.

He was sick during the last two years of his life. Since he returned from a business trip to London in March 1886, he was unable to work, and he died on 17 December 1886 at his residence in Opawa at the age of 48. He is buried at the Heathcote Cemetery.

New Zealand Parliament
Preceded by Henry Wynn-Williams	Member of Parliament for Heathcote; 1884–1886	Succeeded by Frederic Jones
