= Heathcote (New Zealand electorate) =

Heathcote was a 19th-century parliamentary electorate in Christchurch, New Zealand.

== Population centres ==
The electorate was based on the Heathcote Valley suburb.

== History ==
Heathcote existed from 1861 to 1893.

George Williamson Hall resigned in 1862. He was succeeded by William Sefton Moorhouse in the 1862 by-election. Moorhouse himself resigned the following year and was succeeded by Alfred Cox in the 1863 by-election.

John Hall, the younger brother of George and who was later to become the 12th Premier, won the 1866 election against George Buckley and represented Heathcote until 1872, when he resigned for health reasons. At the 1872 by-election, John Cracroft Wilson was elected unopposed to represent the electorate.

James Fisher the represented the electorate over the next two terms, from 1876 to 1881. He was succeeded by lawyer Henry Wynn-Williams, who won the 1881 election. During the next term, beginning with the 1884 election, John Coster was the representative, until his death on 17 December 1886. The 1887 by-election was won by Frederic Jones. Jones was confirmed in the 1887 election a few months later.

The last representative for Heathcote was William Tanner, who won the 1890 election. He defeated Heaton Rhodes in his first attempt to enter Parliament.

=== Members of Parliament ===
Key

Independent Liberal–Labour

Election	Winner
1861 election	George Hall
1862 by-election	William Moorhouse
1863 by-election	Alfred Cox
1866 election	John Hall
1871 election	John Hall
1872 by-election	John Wilson
1876 election	James Fisher
1879 election	James Fisher
1881 election	Henry Wynn-Williams
1884 election	John Coster
1887 by-election	Frederic Jones
1887 election	Frederic Jones
1890 election	William Tanner

== Election results ==
=== 1890 election ===
1890 general election: Heathcote
Party	Candidate	Votes	%	±%
Liberal–Labour	William Tanner	854	57.08	
Conservative	Heaton Rhodes	642	42.92	
Majority		212	14.17	
Turnout		1,496	52.89	
Registered electors		2,828		

=== 1887 by-election ===
The following table gives the election result:

1887 Heathcote by-election
Party	Candidate	Votes	%	±%
Independent	Frederic Jones	527	61.07	
Independent	Aaron Ayers	336	38.93	
Majority		191	22.13	
Turnout		863		

=== 1866 election ===
1866 general election: Heathcote
Party	Candidate	Votes	%	±%
Independent	John Hall	368	60.63	
Independent	George Buckley	239	39.37	
Majority		129	21.25	
Turnout		607		
Registered electors				
