= Bonar (name) =

Bonar is a surname and given name. In County Donegal, it is the anglicized form of the Irish: Ó Cnáimhsí, lit. 'descendant of Cnáimhseach'. The name is associated with Irish cnámh ‘bone’, a semantic connection that may underlie its anglicized form. It is one of very few matronymic Irish surnames. It may also be of French origin, derived from bonair.

== Surname ==
- Aiden Bonar (born 1999), Australian footballer
- Andrew Bonar (1810–1892), Scottish minister
- Bud Bonar (1906–1970), American football player
- Dan Bonar (born 1956), Canadian ice hockey player
- Haley Bonar (born 1983), Canadian-born American singer-songwriter
- Horatius Bonar (1808–1889), Scottish poet and minister
- Ivan Bonar (1924–1988), American actor
- James Bonar (civil servant) (1852–1941), Scottish civil servant, economist and historian
- James Bonar (moderator) (c. 1570–c. 1655), Church of Scotland minister
- James Bonar (philanthropist) (1801–1867), Scottish lawyer and philanthropist
- James Bonar (politician) (1840–1901), New Zealand merchant, shipping agent, company director and politician
- James Bonar (scholar) (1757–1821), Scottish lawyer and amateur astronomer
- Jane C. Bonar (1821–1884), Scottish hymnwriter
- Jim Bonar (1862–1924), Scottish footballer
- John Bonar (minister) (1721–1761), Church of Scotland minister
- John Bonar (set decorator) (1886–1963), American set decorator
- Maureen Bonar (born 1962), Canadian curler
- Paul Bonar (born 1976), Scottish footballer
- Rosalie Julie von Bonar, Austrian noblewoman
- Sarah Bonar (born 1994), Scottish rugby union player
- Steven Bonar (born 1979), Scottish footballer
- Thomson Bonar (1738–1814), Scottish publisher

== Given name ==
- Bonar Bain (1923–2005), Canadian actor
- Bonar Colleano, stage name of American actor Bonar Sullivan (1924–1958)
- Bonar Dunlop (1916–1992), New Zealand artist, sculptor, and illustrator
- Bonar Hardie (1925–2014), British sailor in the 1948 Olympics
- Bonar Law (1858–1923), Prime Minister of the United Kingdom
- Bonar Menninger, author of Mortal Error
- Bonar Sianturi (1944–2022), Indonesian military officer and Regent of Sintang

== Hoax ==
- Sir Bonar Neville-Kingdom, an Internet hoax
