= James Bonar =

James Bonar may refer to:

- James Bonar (civil servant) (1852–1941), Scottish civil servant, economist and historian
- James Bonar (politician) (1840–1901), New Zealand merchant, shipping agent, company director and politician
- James Bonar (scholar) (1757–1821), Scottish lawyer and amateur astronomer
- James Bonar (philanthropist) (1801–1867), Scottish lawyer and philanthropist
- James Bonar (moderator) (c. 1570 – c.1655), moderator of the General Assembly of the Church of Scotland in 1644
- Jim Bonar (1862–1924), Scottish footballer
