= Westland Explorers' Monument =

Obelisk in Hokitika, New Zealand

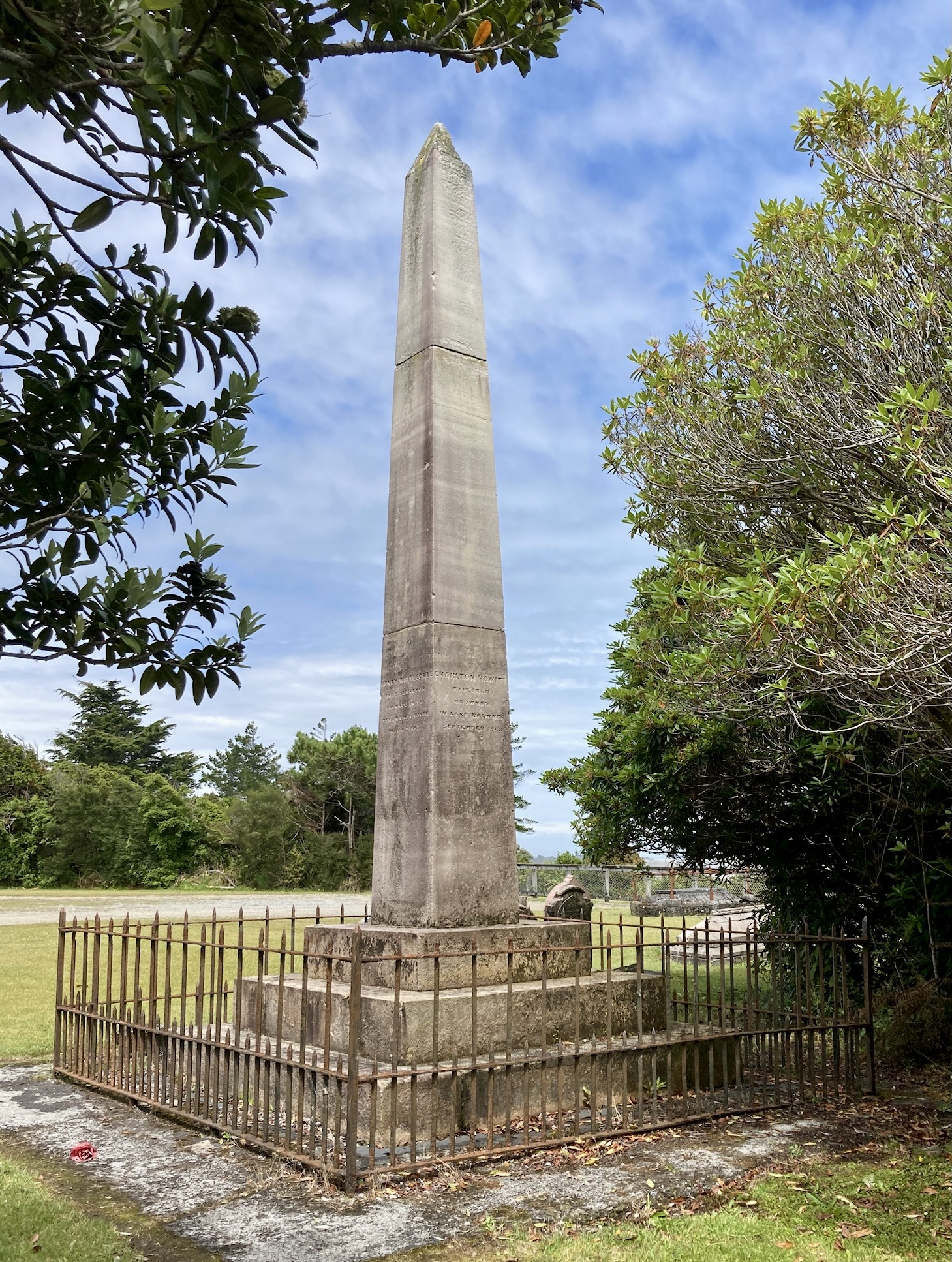
- Westland Explorers' Monument at Hokitika Cemetery
- Interactive map of Westland Explorers' Monument
- 42°42′32.4″S 170°58′29.5″E
- Location: Hokitika Cemetery, New Zealand

History
- Built: 1868
- Built for: Four early explorers who died on the West Coast

Site notes
- Governing body: Westland District Council

The Westland Explorers' Monument, also known as the Explorers' Monument, is an obelisk in Hokitika, New Zealand. It commemorates four men who lost their lives on the West Coast of the South Island between 1863 and 1866. The impetus for its erection in 1868 was the 1866 murder of George Dobson, and early on the monument was referred to as the Dobson Memorial. It was then referred to as the Weld Street Monument in reference to its original location in the centre of the intersection of Weld and Sewell streets. Deemed a traffic impediment, it was shifted to Hokitika Cemetery in 1880, but an even larger structure, the Hokitika Clock Tower, was put in its place at the intersection in 1902/1903.

== History ==
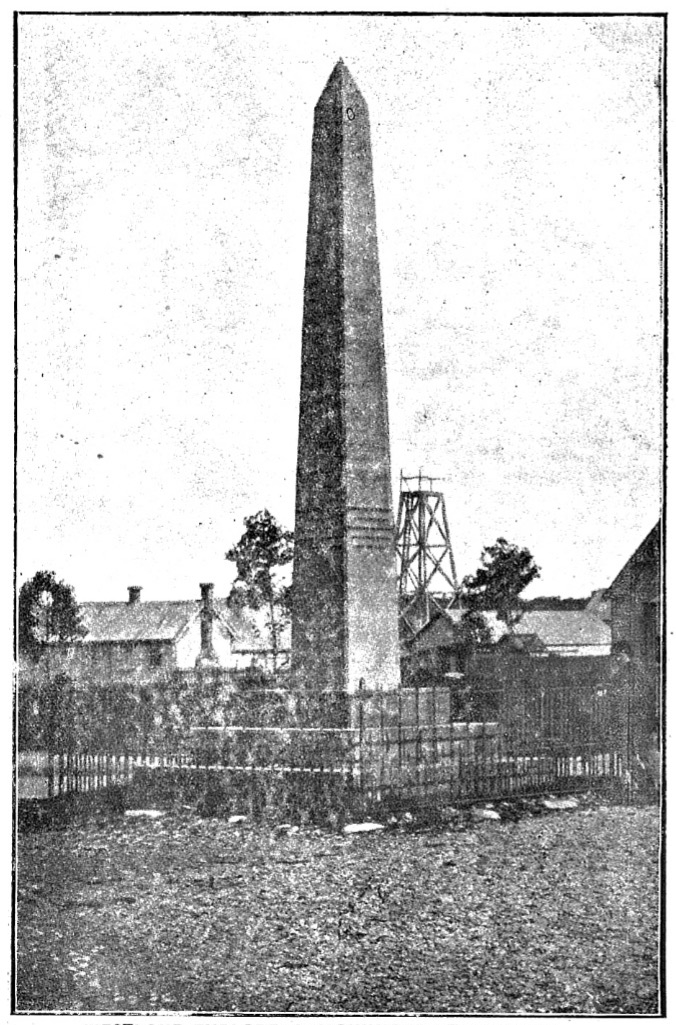
The monument in its original location

A committee named the Dobson Memorial Fund formed in 1867 and suggested that a memorial be erected to commemorate four men. The committee members could not agree on the form of memorial, the materials to be used, or where to put it. George Sale, who had previously been provincial treasurer of Canterbury, was the committee's treasurer. He took charge and without liaising with fellow committee members, he ordered an obelisk from Sydney. The obelisk arrived with the Lizzie Coleson on 16 October 1867 and the first the public knew about the memorial was a notice in the West Coast Times on 24 October:

We understand that "The Dobson memorial", in the form of a very handsome monument, was landed the other day from the Lizzie Coleson. From this we infer that it was constructed in Sydney.

In the same edition of the newspaper, the previous day's municipal council proceedings were reported, including a request by Sale where the council would authorise the Dobson Memorial to be erected. Sale's unilateral actions were initially condemned but the mood soon swung and he received praise to have taken the initiative. It did not take long for the outstanding funds to be raised by public subscription.

The memorial was placed in the centre of the intersection of Weld and Sewell streets; construction started on 29 February 1868. The contractor who won the construction tender was James Reynold. Completion of the memorial was reported on 2 April 1868 but there was no opening ceremony; Hokitika was at the height of the Fenian Uprising at the time and the town was under martial law. The committee had run out of funds, though, and a rough hoarding was left around the monument, which attracted much negative comment. The West Coast Times commented on 5 June 1868:

The disgraceful state of the Dobson Memorial Monument is often the subject of public comment. Surrounded by a broken hoarding which is plastered with placards, whatever beauty there may be in this tribute to the memory of brave men, is entirely lost—even the inscription cannot be read. Surely some steps might be taken to remove the battered hoarding and replace it with a neat railing, if not of iron, at least of wood, so that the monument might be exposed to view, and not remain, as it is, a disgrace to those who erected it and the part of the town on which it stands.

A fundraising concert was organised by the Caxton Dramatic Club. It took until March 1869 before tenders for a railing were called for by Westland County. Before the railing was installed, unknown people pulled down the hoarding overnight on 3 April 1869. Later that month, an iron railing was installed.

On the grounds that it was "not an ornament" and an obstruction, the Hokitika Borough Council resolved in May 1880 to have the memorial relocated from its original location to Hokitika Cemetery. The relocation work was tendered in July 1880. The West Coast Times commented on the monument in its location one more time at this point: "The diminutive monument, or rather the exaggerated milestone, which has for so many years embellished or disfigured—as the reader pleases—the appearance of Weld street, is to be removed to the cemetery." There were plans in 1913 to relocated the memorial to Cass Square but nothing came of this.

Despite obstruction being one of the reasons put forward for the relocation of the monument in 1880, and even larger monument constructed in 1902/1903 was built in its place. The Hokitika Clock Tower has a square base measuring 3.4 metres (11 ft) compared to the 2.4 metres (8 ft) of the Westland Explorers' Monument.

== Description ==
The quadrilateral memorial was made from Sydney freestone. The obelisk rests on a three-tiered base. Each tier is one foot high and they measure eight, six and four feet square. The obelisk measures 18 feet 6 inches (5.64 m) in height, which together with the base comes to 21 feet 6 inches (6.55 m). The column is made of three parts and the lowest part has inscriptions for four men to be commemorated, each face dedicated to one of them.

Inscriptions
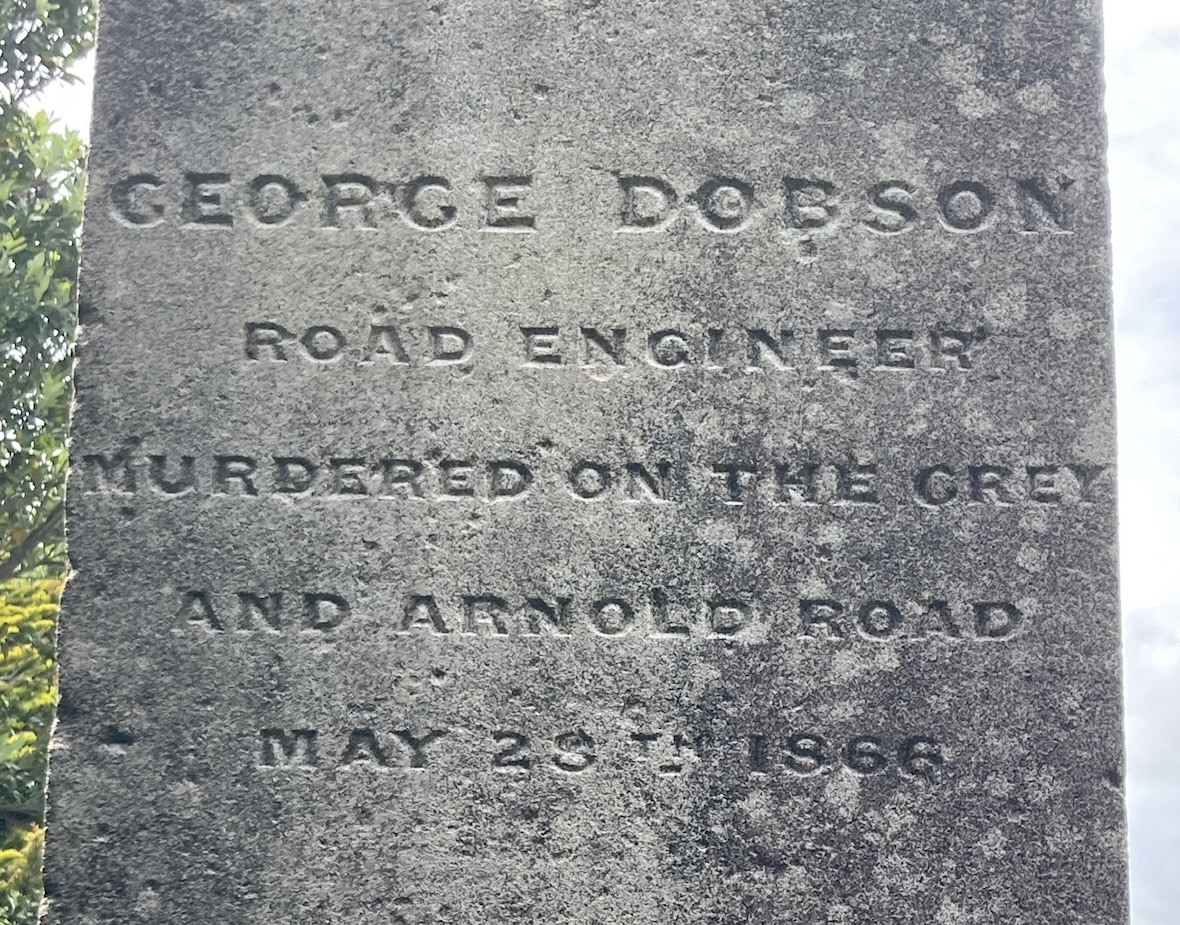
George Dobson
Road Engineer
Murdered on the Grey
and Arnold Road
May 28th 1866

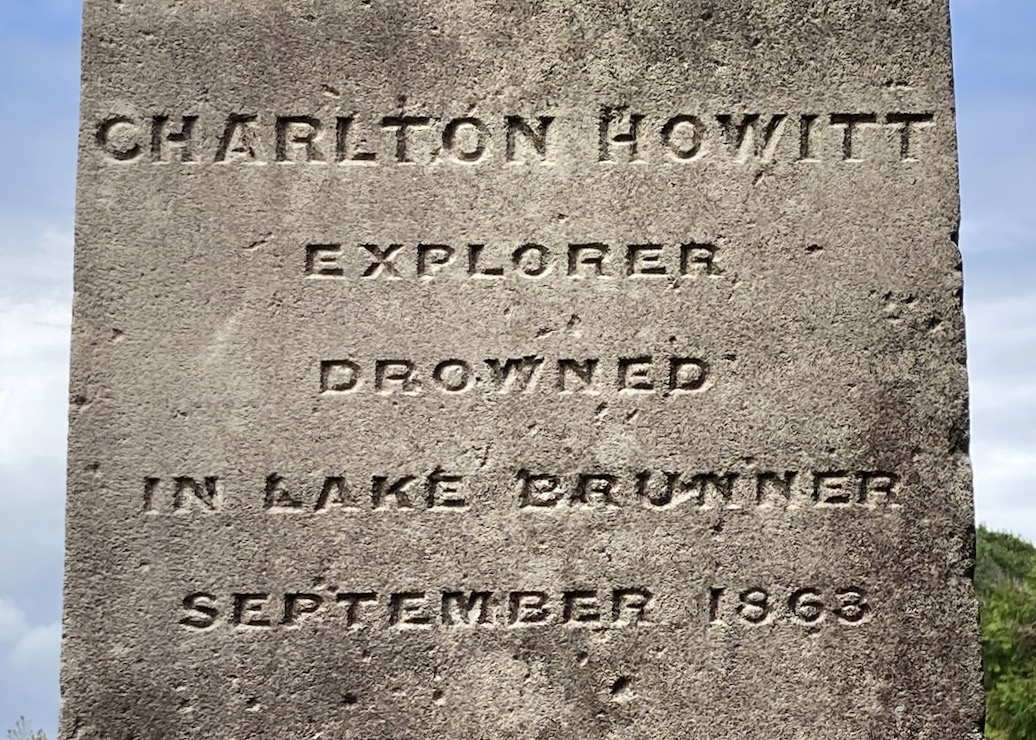
Charlton Howitt
Explorer
drowned
in Lake Brunner
September 1863 (Note: The date shown on the monument is wrong. As documented in the diary of James Hammett, Howitt and two of his men set out in a canoe on 27 June 1863 and it is assumed that they drowned that day.)

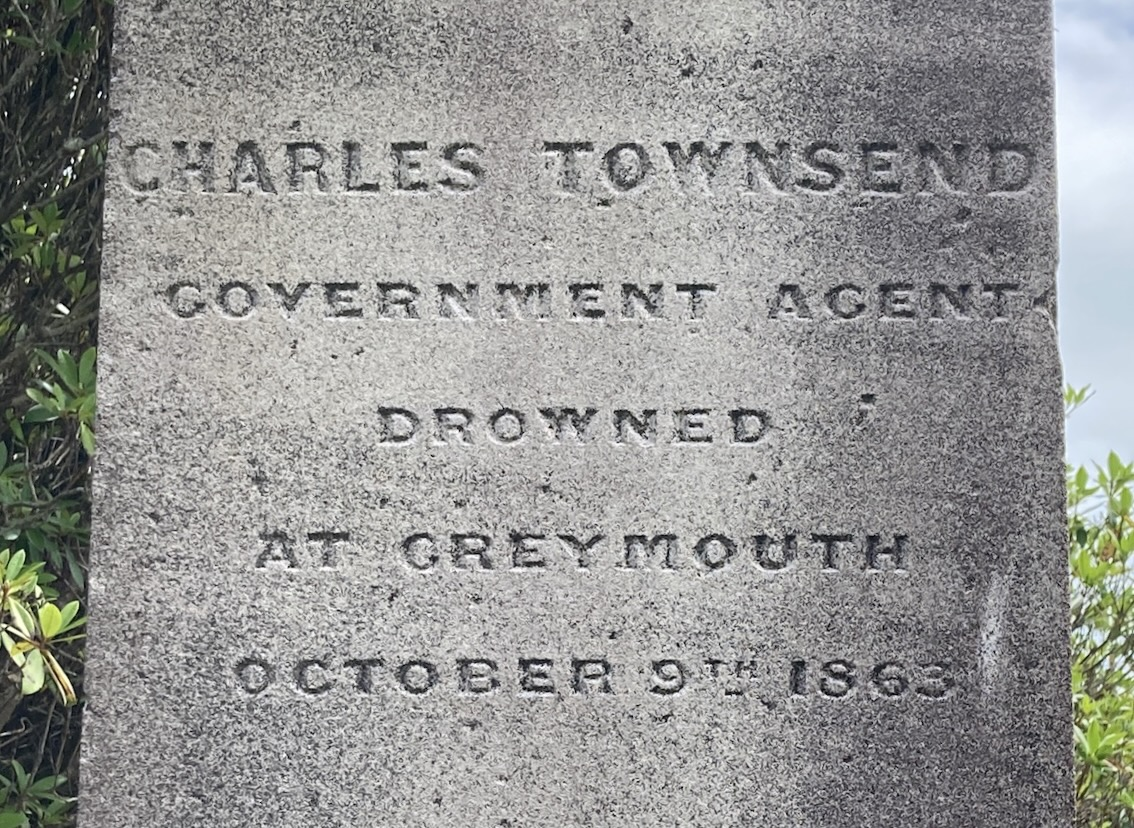
Charles Townsend
Government Agent
drowned
at Greymouth
October 9th 1863

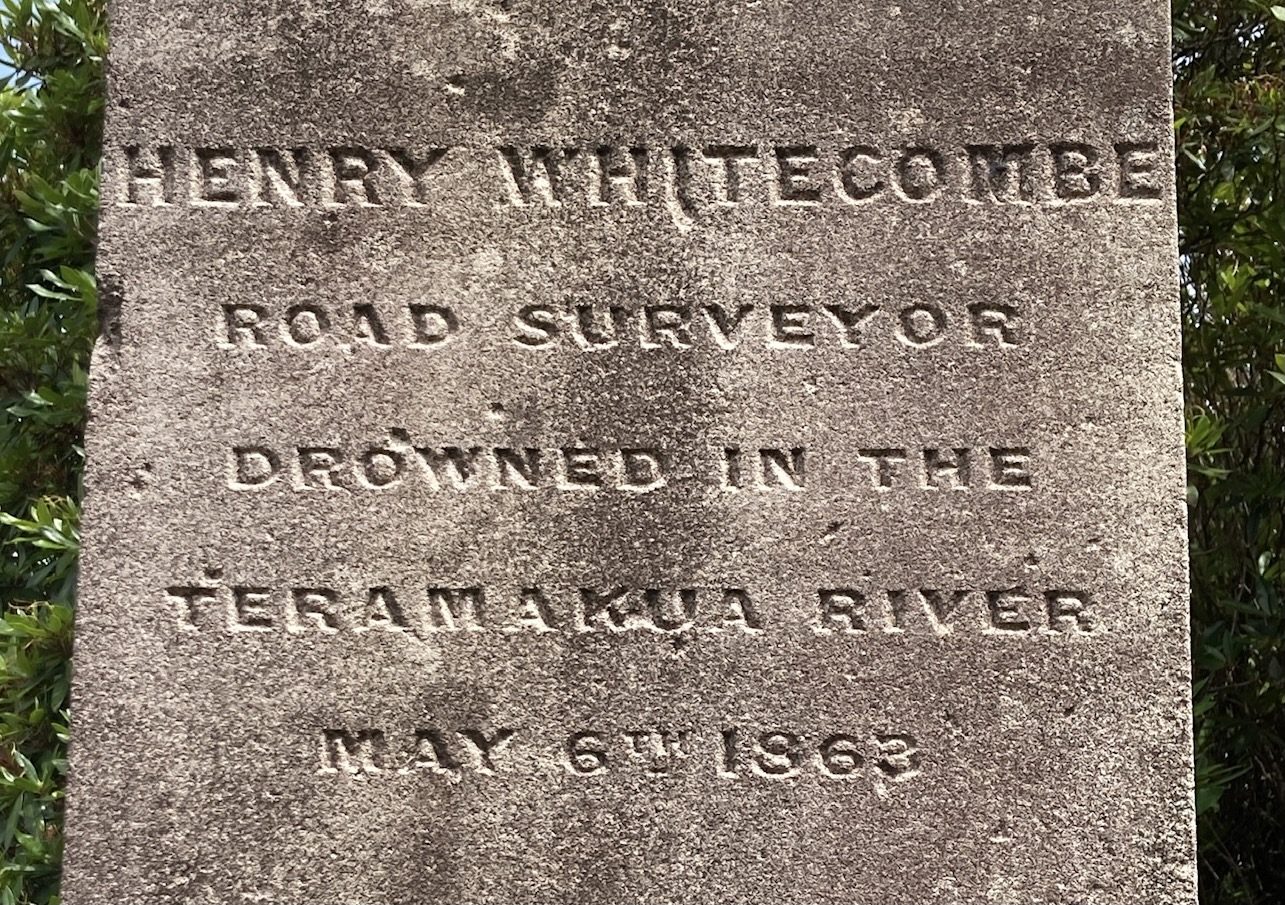
Henry Whitecombe [sic]
Road Surveyor
drowned in the
Teramakua River [sic]
May 6th 1863

Listed here in order of their deaths, four men are commemorated.

=== Henry Whitcombe ===
Henry Whitcombe (1830 – 6 May 1863) was a civil engineer and explorer employed by the Canterbury Provincial Council as an engineer and surveyor. Whitcombe was exploring a possible route from Canterbury to the West Coast with Jacob Lauper. When crossing the Taramakau River, their canoe was washed out to sea and Whitcombe drowned. Lauper's diary was written in German and some details appeared inconsistent. A newer translation of his diary formed the basis of a book about the journey published in 2010: Pushing his Luck: Report of the expedition and death of Henry Whitcombe.

=== Charlton Howitt ===
Charlton Howitt (1838 – 27 June 1863) was a surveyor. He had a contract with the Canterbury Provincial Council to open up a track to the West Coast via Harper Pass. Howitt, together with two other members of his party, Robert Little and Henry Miller, drowned in Lake Brunner on 27 June 1863; their bodies were never found. News of the party's death was first published in the Christchurch newspaper The Press on 4 September 1863.

=== Charles Townsend ===
Charles Townsend (1826 – 9 October 1863) was a surveyor by trade. He was storekeeper in Greymouth on behalf of the Canterbury Provincial Council. Townsend and two of his men—Peter Michelmore and a Māori known as Solomon—drowned when their whaleboat capsized while crossing the Grey River bar.

=== George Dobson ===
George Dobson (26 June 1840 – 28 May 1866) was a surveyor and engineer. He was undertaking road construction in the Grey Valley and murdered in the Brunner Gorge by the Burgess Gang after being mistaken for a local gold buyer.
