= Henry Lahmann =

New Zealand politician

The Honourable Henry Lahmann

Member of the New Zealand Legislative Council
- In office 9 July 1872 – 1 June 1890 (died in office)

Speaker of the Westland Province Council
- In office 8 June 1874 – 31 October 1876
- Preceded by: John White
- Succeeded by: Council abolished

Member of the Westland Province Council for Greymouth riding
- In office January 1874 – 31 October 1876 Serving with two other members
- Preceded by: Council inaugurated
- Succeeded by: Council abolished

Chairman of Westland County
- In office 12 January 1871 – 8 January 1873
- Preceded by: Conrad Hoos
- Succeeded by: Henry Lee Robinson

Member of the Westland County Council for Greymouth riding
- In office December 1868 – December 1872 Serving with two other members
- Preceded by: William Henry Harrison

Personal details
- Born: Henry Hermann Lahmann; 21 February 1816 Bremen, Germany
- Died: 1 June 1890 (aged 74) Albert Street, Greymouth, New Zealand
- Occupation: Merchant, shipping agent. politician

Henry Hermann Lahmann (21 February 1816 – 1 June 1890), also known as Henry Herman Lahman and often referred to as H. H. Lahman, was a German immigrant who became a politician on the West Coast of New Zealand. He was active in provincial politics and was later appointed to the Legislative Council (1872–1890).

== Biography ==
Lahmann was born in 1816 in Bremen, Germany, where he received his education. He went to London as a young man for business, before emigrating to Melbourne, Victoria, Australia in 1853, where he worked as a merchant and shipping agent for eight years.

=== New Zealand ===
Lahmann came to Otago in New Zealand when gold was discovered and had a tobacco store in Dunedin. The West Coast gold rush brought him to Greymouth in late 1865, where he had business interests in shipping, timber, and as a general merchant.

==== Politics ====
Lahmann was one of the founding members of the Greymouth town improvement committee. He succeeded William Henry Harrison as the representative of the Greymouth riding on the council of Westland County, the predecessor of Westland Province; he represented Greymouth from December 1868 until December 1872. He was the fourth chairman of Westland County, from 12 January 1871 to 8 January 1873.

When the Westland Province was inaugurated, Lahmann successfully stood for election in January 1874 for one of the three seats in the Greymouth electorate. He remained a member of the provincial council until the abolition of the council in October 1876. After John White resigned as Speaker of the Provincial Council to join its Executive, Lahmann became the council's second and last Speaker (8 June 1874 – 31 October 1876).

He was a member of the New Zealand Legislative Council from 9 July 1872 until his death.

==== Death ====
Lahmann died aged 74 on 1 June 1890 at his residence in Albert Street, Greymouth. He had been in poor health for several years and had been almost blind during that time. His wife had died many years before him.
