= Captain of industry =

Type of business leader

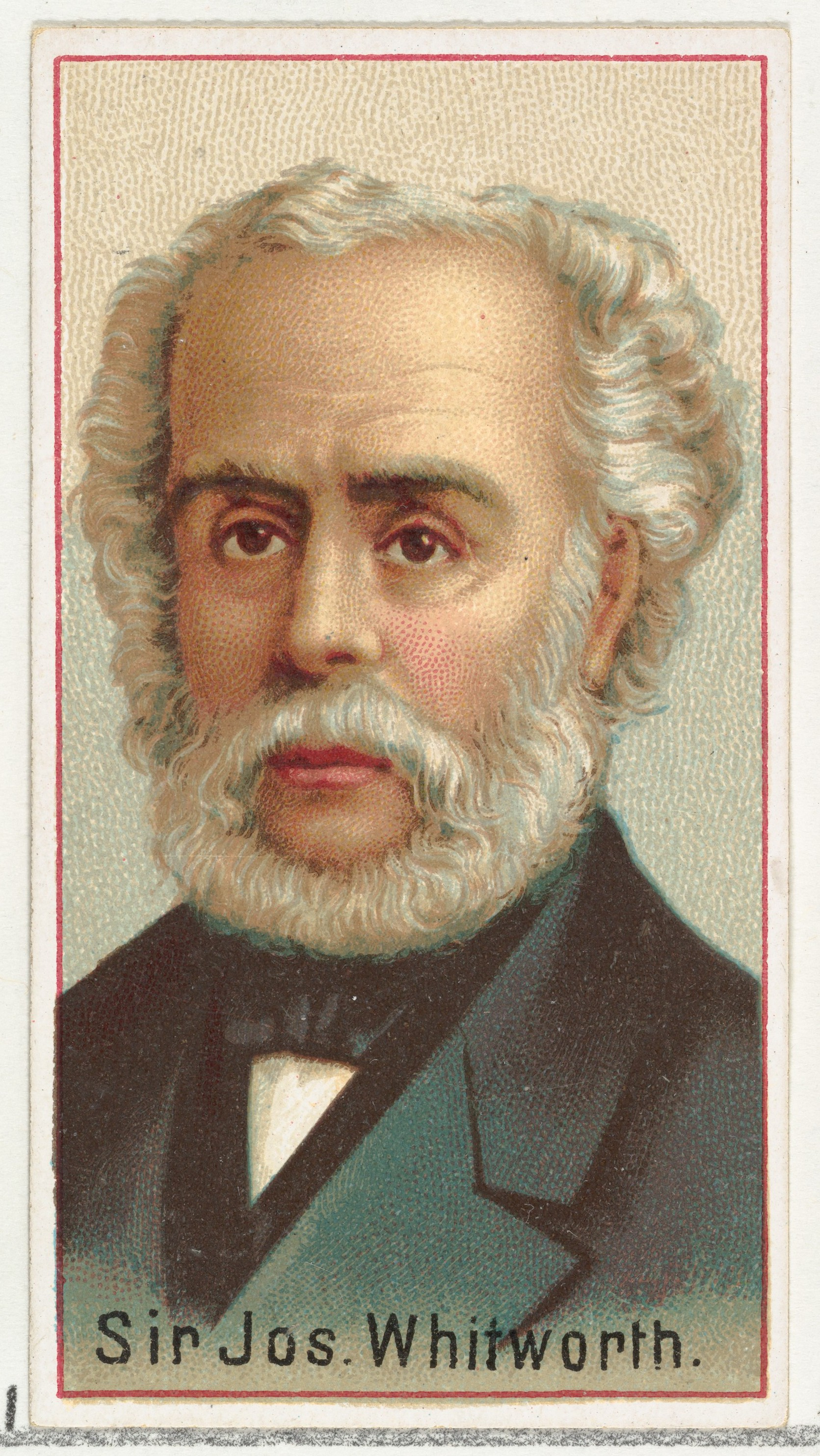
Joseph Whitworth, whom Carlyle lauded as an exemplary captain of industry

In the 19th century, a captain of industry was a business leader whose means of amassing a personal fortune contributed positively to the country in some way. This may have been through increased productivity, expansion of markets, providing more jobs, or acts of philanthropy. This characterization contrasts with that of the robber baron, a business leader using political means to achieve personal ends.

== Origin ==
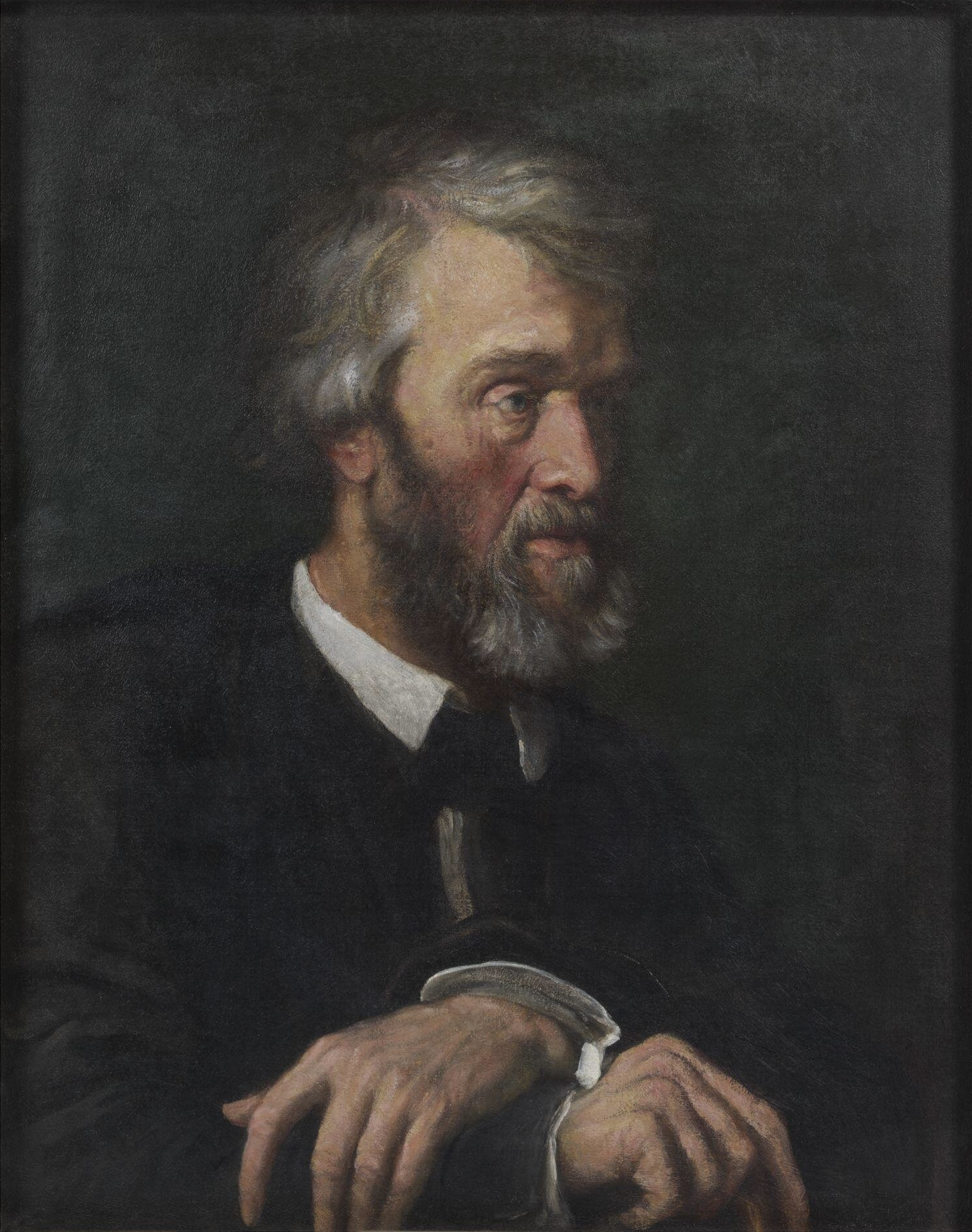
Thomas Carlyle by George Frederic Watts, 1868

The term was coined by the Scottish essayist, historian and philosopher Thomas Carlyle in his essay "Count Cagliostro" (1833).

In such periods of Social Decay, what is called an overflowing population, that is a population which, under the old Captains of Industry (named Higher Classes, Ricos Hombres, Aristocracies and the like), can no longer find work and wages, increases the number of Unprofessionals, Lackalls, Social Nondescripts; with appetite of utmost keenness, which there is no known method of satisfying. Nay, more, and perversely enough, ever as Population augments, your Captains of Industry can and do dwindle more and more into Captains of Idleness; whereby the more and more overflowing Population is worse and worse governed (shown what to do, for that is the only government): thus is the candle lighted on both sides; and the number of social Nondescripts increases in double-quick ratio.

In Past and Present (1843), Carlyle uses the term in reference to industrialists, such as mill-owners, whom he regards as a new aristocracy. In Carlyle's view, British society's devotion to appearances (fashion, wealth, status) at the expense of substance (good, hard, honest labor) has resulted in a need for "the awakening of the Nation's soul from its asphyxia." Carlyle identifies the heart of England's social ills as being the relationship between employers and the employed, based solely on "Cash-payment for the sole nexus." What is called society has produced nothing but the "totalest separation, isolation," and the false belief that "Cash-payment...absolves and liquidates all engagements of man." Carlyle asserts that "No Working World . . . can be led on without a noble Chivalry of Work, and laws and fixed rules which follow out of that," a return to social order through mutual obligation and respect. Underlying the "Chivalry of Labour" is the basic assumption that human beings work best in a hierarchical structure. Laborers that "work not as in a Great Taskmaster's eye, will work wrong"; while the captains of industry would offer noble leadership and guidance to those beneath them, ruling the workplace as enlightened taskmasters, the workers would possess an equally enlightened sense of loyalty, both to their "captains" and their labor.

=== Influence on economists ===
Carlyle's concept influenced economists such as Joseph Shield Nicholson, John Kells Ingram, Arnold Toynbee (who nevertheless found the idea overly paternalistic), James Bonar, Alfred Marshall, and (especially) William Smart. Publications such as the Economic Review and the Economic Journal praised figures like Ernst Abbe as models of Carlyle's vision.

== Versus "robber baron" ==
Some 19th-century industrialists who were called "captains of industry" overlap with those called "robber barons". These include people such as Cornelius Vanderbilt, Andrew Carnegie, Andrew Mellon, Leland Stanford and John D. Rockefeller.

The education division of the National Endowment for the Humanities has prepared a lesson plan for schools asking whether "robber baron" or "captain of industry" is the better terminology. The lesson states that it attempts to help students "establish a distinction between robber barons and captains of industry. Students will uncover some less honorable deeds, as well as the shrewd business moves and highly charitable acts of the great industrialists and financiers. It has been argued that only because such people were able to amass great amounts of capital could our country become the world's greatest industrial power. Some actions of these men, which could only happen in a period of economic laissez faire, resulted in poor conditions for workers, but in the end, may also have enabled our present-day standard of living."
