= George Dobson (surveyor) =

New Zealand surveyor and murder victim

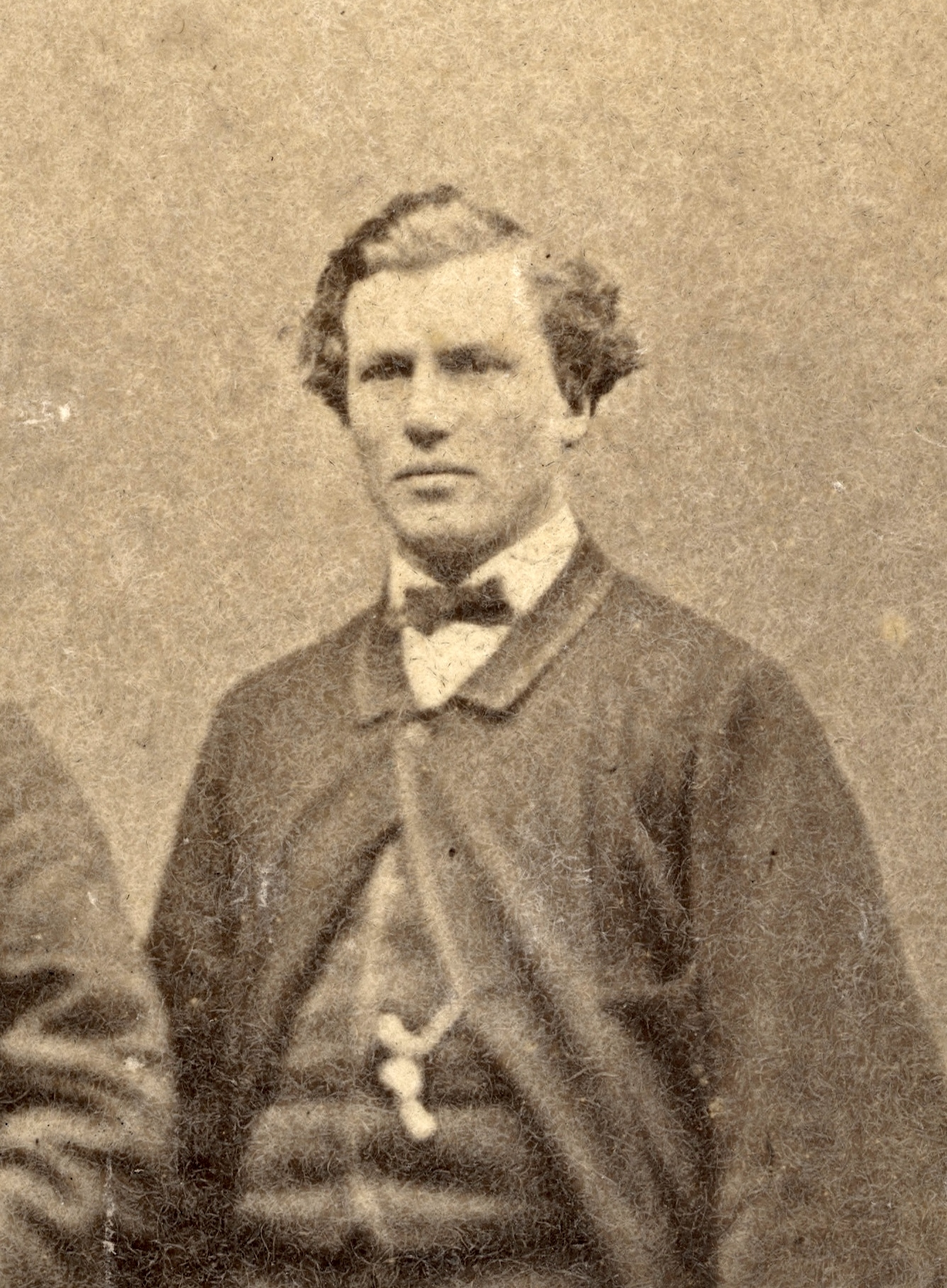
- Dobson in the 1860s
- Born: 26 June 1840; Islington, England
- Died: 28 May 1866 (aged 25); Dobson, New Zealand
- Cause of death: Strangulation
- Resting place: Karoro Cemetery, Greymouth, New Zealand
- Occupation: Surveyor
- Known for: Victim of murder
- Parent: Edward Dobson
- Relatives: Arthur Dudley Dobson (brother)

George Dobson (26 June 1840 – 28 May 1866) was a New Zealand surveyor and engineer who was murdered in the Brunner Gorge on the West Coast by the Burgess Gang after being mistaken for a local gold buyer.

== Early life ==
George Dobson was born in Islington, London, in 1840. He was the son of Edward Dobson, a surveyor and railway engineer, and Mary Ann, née Lough. When the railway boom ended in England, his father decided to emigrate to New Zealand. He purchased land from the Canterbury Association and sailed to the colony on the Cressy, one of the First Four Ships. The Cressy arrived in Lyttelton on 27 December 1850. George and his younger brother Arthur accompanied him on the voyage but were later joined by their mother when she arrived on the Fatima, which had landed in Lyttelton exactly one year after them, on 27 December 1851 who also bought their four other siblings. His father found that life in the new colony with two young sons was challenging, and they were sent to their uncle, Reverend Charles Dobson, the vicar of Buckland in Tasmania, where they stayed for three years. On their return journey, they landed in Nelson, where they stayed with another uncle, Alfred Dobson. He was surveying the Nelson region and soon after became the Nelson provincial surveyor. As his father had been appointed Canterbury provincial engineer in 1854, the financial situation improved, and the boys were sent to Christ's College, then the best school in Christchurch. Prior to this, the boys were taught by the Reverend George Cotterill in Lyttelton.

== Murder ==
George worked alongside his brother as a surveyor for the Canterbury Provincial Government during the early part of his brothers exploration into finding a route between Canterbury and the West Coast, assisting in the surveying of road lines. George accepted work out of Greymouth where he was employed to maintain and construct roads along the Grey River and fulfilled the role of resident engineer. While traveling between Greymouth and Lake Brunner, he was apprehended by bushrangers near the site of the current town of Dobson. The bushrangers, later confirmed to be members of the Burgess Gang, held him up believing that he was storekeeper and gold buyer Edward Fox. After robbing him of a few pounds the gang members beat him with the butt of a gun in the head before strangling him, leaving his body half buried two hundred yards from the track.

Dobson's murder was the impetus to a committee forming that eventually had the Westland Explorers' Monument built. Alongside Dobson, three others who lost their lives on the West Coast in 1863 are commemorated. The monument was originally located in the centre of an intersection in Hokitika (where the Hokitika Clock Tower now stands), but in 1880, it was shifted to the Hokitika Cemetery.
