= Mayor of Hokitika =

The Mayor of Hokitika officiated over the borough of Hokitika in New Zealand. The office was created in 1866 when Hokitika became a municipality and a borough two years later, and ceased with the 1989 local government reforms, when Hokitika Borough and Westland County merged to form Westland District. The first Mayor of Hokitika was James Bonar.

== History ==
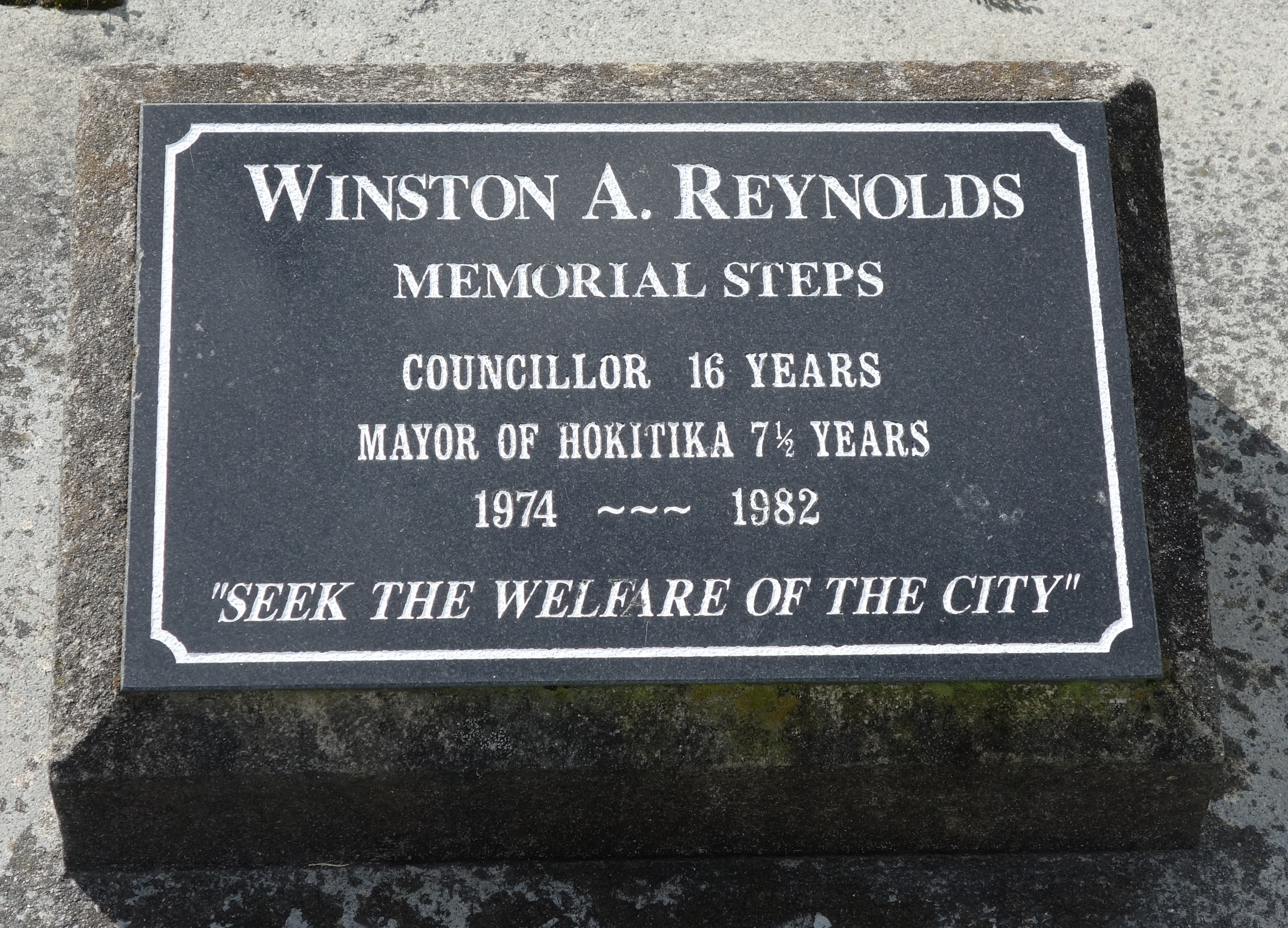
Memorial plaque for Winston A. Reynolds (1974–1982)

Hokitika was first settled by Europeans in 1864 after gold had been found on the West Coast, and it quickly became the centre of the West Coast gold rush. The first chairman of the municipal council was James Bonar in 1865, and this role became that of the Mayor of Hokitika in 1866. Hokitika became a municipal district of Canterbury Province on 5 June 1866, and through the Hokitika Municipal Corporation Ordinance of 1867 was designated a borough on 24 August 1868.

The second mayor was William Shaw, who successfully contested an election against Charles Button and Evan Prosser on 21 October 1867. Shaw, Button, and Prosser received 205, 193, and 130 votes, respectively. In the early years, the borough councillors usually elected a mayor from their midst, but in 1867, a local ordinance applied that gave the public the right to elect the mayor.

Councillor Prosser was elected unanimously at a council meeting on 9 September 1868 by his fellow councillors. The next election was held in December of the same year, and the Hokitika Borough came within the normal schedule of voting the mayor at the end of the year as prescribed by The Municipal Corporations Act. At the meeting on 16 December, Mayor Prosser was re-elected by the councillors. Prosser resigned during May 1869, as he had bought a pharmaceutical business in Dunedin, to where he was going to relocate; Charles Button was voted to replace him as mayor. Prosser left Hokitika during June 1869.

Button resigned the mayoralty on 15 October 1869, as he was about to leave the West Coast. The meeting was adjourned to 19 October, when Samuel Boyle was elected mayor. At the council meeting on 15 December of that year, Boyle was re-elected as mayor for the following year. At the council meeting on 21 December 1870, James Midgely Higgin was elected mayor in succession to Samuel Boyle. Higgin foreshadowed his intention to resign at the council meeting on 15 September 1871, and at the adjourned meeting on 19 September, the letter of resignation was read out, and two councillors were nominated: James B. Clarke and George Frederick Hawkins, which Clarke won by five votes to three. The local newspaper, The West Coast Times, was highly critical of the situation and the new mayor. It thought Clarke unfit to be a mayor, and impressed on their readership that anybody who they vote for as councillor might become mayor, so they should take more care when supporting candidates. At the next election for mayor on 20 December 1871, three candidates were put forward: James B. Clarke (the incumbent), Councillor John Tait, and Councillor William Todd. The voting was six, five and three votes for Clarke, Tait, and Todd, respectively, but the whole situation turned into a shambles, as it was unclear whether councillors had voted for a mayor for the next year, or whether they had eliminated one of the candidates from the list. The West Coast Times was once again being scathing about the situation, pointing out that 14 votes had been cast by 9 councillors present, hence it could not have been an election for mayor. The disagreement carried into the new year, when a majority of councillors refused to accept the minutes as a true and correct record, stating that Clarke had been re-elected as mayor. Clarke resigned as mayor and councillor on 17 January 1872, and a new mayor had to be elected. At the next council meeting on 20 January 1872, it was decided to vote for the remaining two candidates, with Todd and Tait receiving five and two votes, respectively. Each of the candidates voted for the other. Todd was thus declared elected.

Frederick Learmonth was elected mayor in 1878. He resigned in March 1879. John Tait and McLean Watt Jack were nominated for the resulting election, but Tait retired from the contest before the election was held and Jack was declared elected.

The regular 1879 mayoral election was held on 26 November and was contested by the incumbent, Jack, and the previous mayor Learmonth. Jack won the election with 153 votes to 96. In the next election on 24 November 1880, four candidates stood for office: former mayor Learmonth, councillor John Tait, John Peake, and John Robert Hudson. Voting was close, and Learmonth, Tait, Peake, and Hudson received 129, 110, 89, and 71 votes, respectively. There were concerns whether the preparation of a supplementary roll of electors was legal, and the matter went to court. The resident magistrate ruled on 18 December "that the whole election is void". A new election was called for 10 January 1881. Of the previous candidates, Peake did not stand again, and Learmonth, Tait, and Hudson received 149, 104, and 30 votes, respectively; Learmonth was thus once again declared elected.

== List of mayors ==
The following is a complete list of the mayors of Hokitika:

	Name	Portrait	Term of office		Duration
1	James Bonar		16 November 1866	23 October 1867	341 days
2	William Shaw		23 October 1867	9 September 1868	322 days
3	Evan Prosser		9 September 1868	14 May 1869	247 days
4	Charles Button		14 May 1869	18 October 1869	157 days
5	Samuel Boyle		18 October 1869	21 December 1870	1 year, 64 days
6	James Midgely Higgin		21 December 1870	19 September 1871	272 days
7	James B. Clarke		19 September 1871	16 January 1872	119 days
8	William Todd		19 January 1872	18 December 1874	2 years, 333 days
9	Francis Christopher Tabart		18 December 1874	4 August 1876	1 year, 230 days
10	McLean Watt Jack		18 August 1876	20 December 1877	1 year, 124 days
11	Frederick Learmonth		20 December 1877	21 March 1879	1 year, 91 days
(10)	McLean Watt Jack (2nd time)		4 April 1879	15 December 1880	1 year, 255 days
(11)	Frederick Learmonth (2nd time)		15 December 1880	2 September 1881	261 days
12	John Cross		16 September 1881	21 December 1881	96 days
13	William Llewellin Fowler		21 December 1881	16 December 1885	3 years, 360 days
14	John Tait		16 December 1885	15 December 1886	364 days
15	Henry Michel		15 December 1886	21 December 1887	1 year, 6 days
16	Charles E. Holmes		21 December 1887	19 December 1888	364 days
17	Joseph Mandl		19 December 1888	28 December 1891	3 years, 9 days
18	Henry Lee Robinson		28 December 1891	21 December 1892	359 days
19	Robert Wentworth Wade		21 December 1892	19 December 1894	1 year, 363 days
(17)	Joseph Mandl (2nd time)		19 December 1894	16 December 1896	1 year, 363 days
(15)	Henry Michel (2nd time)		16 December 1896	4 May 1904	7 years, 140 days
(17)	Joseph Mandl (3rd time)		4 May 1904	2 May 1906	1 year, 363 days
(15)	Henry Michel (3rd time)		2 May 1906	3 May 1911	5 years, 1 day
20	George Perry		3 May 1911	9 April 1942	30 years, 341 days
21	Albert Elcock		27 April 1942	26 November 1947	5 years, 213 days
22	Arnold Perry		26 November 1947	9 November 1953	5 years, 348 days
23	Ernie Heenan		9 November 1953	15 September 1958	4 years, 310 days
24	Jack Richards		6 November 1958	14 October 1974	15 years, 342 days
25	Winston Reynolds		14 October 1974	3 April 1982	7 years, 171 days
26	Henry Pierson		25 May 1982	31 October 1989	7 years, 159 days
