= James Holmes (politician) =

New Zealand politician (1831–1910)

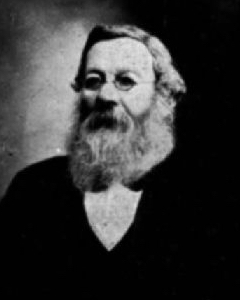
James Holmes

James Holmes JP (26 January 1831 – 17 April 1910) was a member of the New Zealand Legislative Council from Hokitika on the West Coast.

== Early life ==
Holmes was born at Brighton, Sussex, England on 26 January 1831. He trained as a painter and left for Australia in 1852 to join the Victorian gold rush. He mined for gold in Forest Creek (now known as Castlemaine), Bendigo, and Ballarat. From 1855 to 1860, he had a painting and paperhanging business in Geelong.

== Life in New Zealand ==
In 1861, Holmes moved to Dunedin to set up his business there. He returned to Geelong briefly to bring his wife and children to New Zealand. In July 1865, he relocated his family and business to Hokitika.

Holmes bought the Okuku water race at Kumara in 1880 and sold it after 20 years. He was part of the consortium that installed the second battery in Reefton. He served on the Hokitika Harbour Board, the Hokitika High School Board, the Licensing Bench, the Hokitika Borough council, and other public bodies. He was captain of the Fire Brigade, vice-president of the Hokitika Savings Bank, and was a Justice of the Peace since the early 1880s.

Holmes was closely associated with Richard Seddon and organised his election committees. He was appointed by the Liberal Government to the Legislative Council. He served his first term from 18 April 1902 to 17 April 1909. He served his second term from 18 April 1909 to 17 April 1910, when he died. He had been ill for quite some months and had missed the last session of the legislative council. He was cared for by one of his daughters in Epsom, where he died. He was buried at Hokitika Cemetery.

== Family ==
Holmes was married twice and in 1906, he had eleven surviving children. One son died in Christchurch in 1881 aged 20, and his eldest son died in Timaru in 1885 aged 29. His second wife was Sophia Holmes (née Middleton); they married in 1879 and she died on 3 November 1914 in Hastings, where she was residing with one of her daughters. She was buried at Hokitika Cemetery in the family grave.
