= Westland County =

Coordinates: 42°42′56″S 170°58′5″E

- Provinces of New Zealand
- Westland County within New Zealand between 1868 and 1873
- Country: New Zealand
- Island: South Island
- Established: 1 January 1868
- Abolished: 30 November 1873
- Re-established: 1 November 1876
- Abolished: 31 October 1989
- Seat: Hokitika

Westland County, also known as County of Westland, was a local government area on the West Coast of New Zealand's South Island. It existed from 1868 to 1873, and then from 1876 until 1989. In its first incarnation, it constituted the government for the area that was split from the Canterbury Province, with the West Coast gold rush having given the impetus for that split. It had the same administrative powers as a provincial council, but the legislative power rested with Parliament in Wellington. The first Westland County was the predecessor to Westland Province.

Following the abolition of the provinces in 1876, Westland County was re-established, but was smaller than previously, with the area north of the Taramakau River being included as part of the new Grey County. Hokitika Borough was separate from Westland County, although the county seat was in Hokitika. The county was abolished for a second time in the 1989 local government reforms, when Westland County and Hokitika Borough were amalgamated to form Westland District.

== Background ==
The Canterbury Province, founded in 1853, initially extended from the West Coast to the East Coast of the South Island. Few people initially lived on the West Coast; most of them were Māori. Communication between the coastal areas was difficult, as the Southern Alps / Kā Tiritiri o te Moana created a strong barrier. In practice, most of the communication was by ship; overland journeys were seldom undertaken.

All this changed when in late 1863 gold was found on the West Coast. Over the next three years, some 30,000 people moved to the West Coast. Some of the richest gold deposits were in an area inland from Greymouth that was bisected by the boundaries set in 1853; part of the gold reserves were located in the Nelson Province. The Canterbury Provincial Council reacted to the situation by installing George Sale as goldfields commissioner with wide-ranging powers. Sale was responsible to the Executive Council of the Canterbury Provincial Council only. He set up his administration in Hokitika, which thus became a sub-capital

In parallel, the Canterbury Provincial Council commissioned the provincial engineer, Edward Dobson, with finding a suitable route to be found for a road link. Dobson settled on the route that had previously been discovered by his son Arthur, and construction of this route over Arthur's Pass started shortly thereafter. The road was to be paid from income raised on the goldfields, but West Coasters objected to this, as they saw much more need for public works on the West Coast itself. Out of this, a separation movement formed on the West Coast. In parallel, people in Greymouth petitioned the House of Representatives for their region to be annexed to Nelson Province. The Hokitika petition was granted, and Westland County was established.

== History ==
=== First incarnation, 1868–1873 ===
Parliament passed the County of Westland Act in 1867, and the county came into force on 1 January 1868. The tenure of the five members of the West Coast on the Canterbury Provincial Council finished on 31 December 1867: Edmund Barff and Conrad Hoos for the Westland electorate, James Bonar and Michael Albert Cassius for the Hokitika electorate, and John Arthur Whall for the Greymouth electorate. The legislation gave the Governor the power to install a chairman, and Sir George Grey appointed John Hall. The other eight members were to be elected: four from Westland District, and two each from Hokitika and Greymouth.

The first council recommended changes to the legislation, and a new act was passed: the County of Westland Act, 1868, which came into force on 1 November 1868. This act also provided for a membership of nine: two each from Hokitika and Greymouth, and one from each of the five road districts (Paroa, Arahura, Kaniere, Totara, and Ōkārito). This council would elect its chairman from within its membership.

This form of government gave the county the administrative powers of a provincial council, but saw the legislative powers remain with Parliament in Wellington. Hall is credited with the idea for this form of government. Members of Parliament were not happy with having to spend their time on local legislation, and in 1873, it was decided to confer full status of a provincial council to Westland through the Province of Westland Act, 1873. The act came into force on 1 December 1873, and with this, Westland County ceased to exist and Westland Province was created.

There were five chairmen during the first incarnation of Westland County:

	Name	Portrait	Term of office		Duration
1	John Hall		20 Jan 1868	7 Mar 1868	47 days
2	James Bonar		7 Mar 1868	14 Jan 1869	313 days
3	Conrad Hoos		14 Jan 1869	12 Jan 1871	1 year, 363 days
4	Henry Lahmann		12 Jan 1871	8 Jan 1873	1 year, 362 days
5	Henry Lee Robinson		8 Jan 1873	30 Nov 1873	326 days

=== Second incarnation, 1876–1989 ===
Westland Province, along with the other eight extant provinces, were abolished by the Abolition of Provinces Act 1875. Formally, the province ceased to exist on 1 November 1876, with the re-establishment of Westland County under the terms of the Counties Act 1876, although there was a two-month transitional period when the provincial superintendent remained in office while the county council was elected. The new Westland County had as its northern boundary the Taramakau River, with the area to the north that had been part of the earlier Westland County being included in Grey County. As before, the southern boundary was the Awarua River, and the eastern boundary was the Main Divide.

The boroughs of Hokitika, Ross (constituted 1878) and Kumara were separate administrative areas, but Hokitika was nevertheless the county seat. The borough of Kumara merged into Westland County in 1969, and Ross followed suit in 1972.

The local government reforms of 1989 brought about the merger of Hokitika Borough and Westland County, creating Westland District.
