= Hokitika Cemetery =

New Zealand cemetery

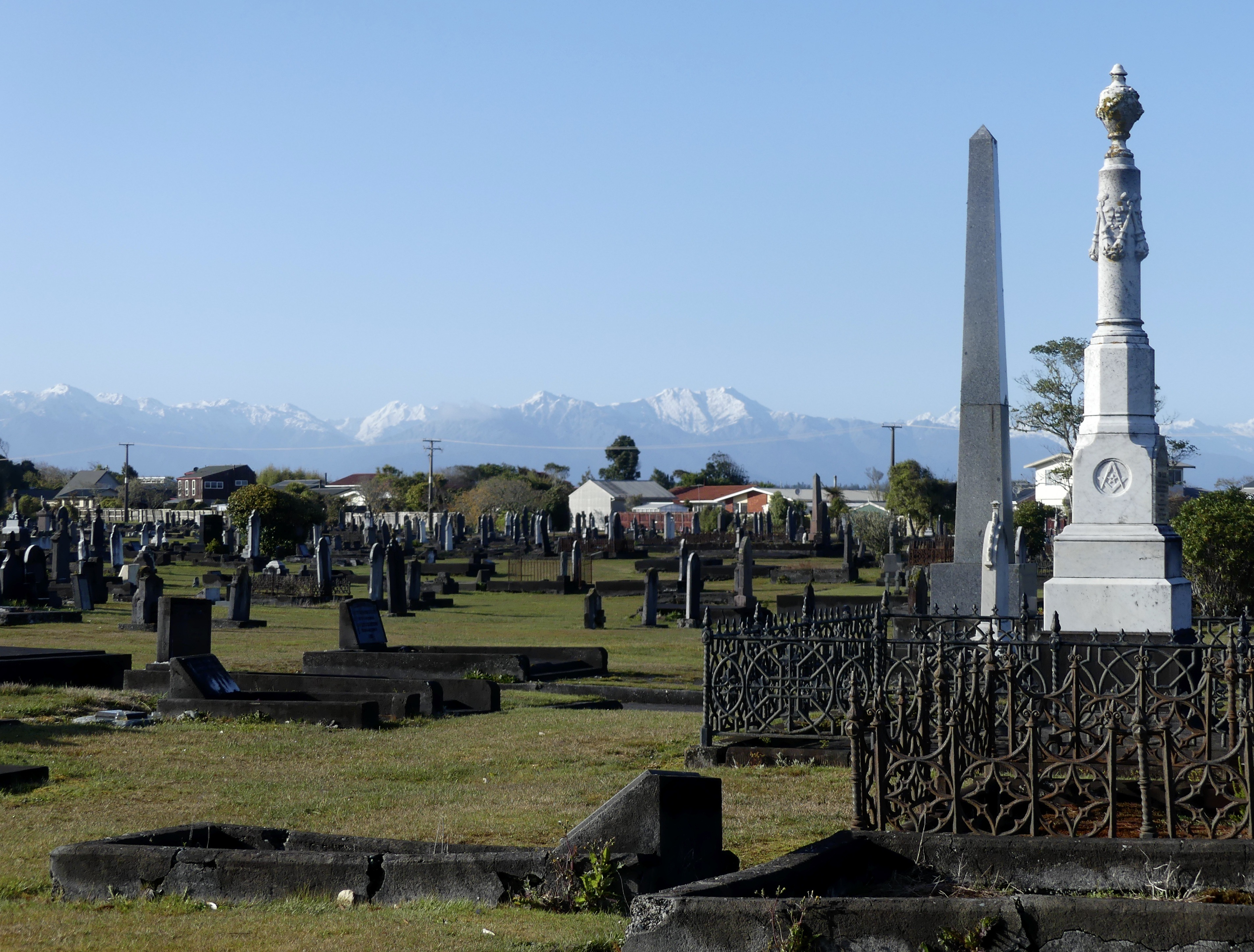
- Hokitika Cemetery in 2020
- Interactive map of Hokitika Cemetery

Details
- Location: Hokitika
- Country: New Zealand
- Coordinates: 42°42′37″S 170°58′33″E
- Owned by: Westland District Council
- Website: www.westlanddc.govt.nz/cemetery-information
- Find a Grave: Hokitika Cemetery
- Footnotes: Westland District cemeteries database

Hokitika Cemetery, also known as Seaview Cemetery, is the cemetery for Hokitika in New Zealand.

The cemetery is located on Hospital Hill Road in the suburb of Seaview on an elevated site north-east of the town, giving a good outlook over the settlement and the Tasman Sea. State Highway 6 is located at the bottom of the hill. Hokitika Airport is located just east of the cemetery. Previously, the jail, mental institution (Seaview Asylum) and hospital were located between the cemetery and the airport, and there is a memorial in the cemetery to the inmates of the asylum and gaol who were buried in unmarked graves.

== Explorers' Monument ==
The Westland Explorers' Monument was erected in 1868 in the centre of the intersection of Weld and Sewell Streets. It was moved to the entrance of Hokitika Cemetery in 1880; the Hokitika Clock Tower was later erected in the same place in 1902. The monument memorialises four explorers, surveyors Henry Whitcombe (1830–1863), Charlton Howitt (1838–1863), and George Dobson (1840–1866), and government agent Charles Townsend (1826–1863). Whitcombe, Howitt and Townsend all drowned in separate accidents in 1863, while Dobson was mistaken for a gold buyer, E.B. Fox, and murdered by the Burgess Gang.

== The SS Lady Darling ==
Drowning, either while crossing the Hokitika bar or attempting to cross a river, was such a common death that it became known as the West Coast Disease, and between 1865 and 1870 more than 40 deaths by drowning were recorded. Amongst the earliest burials in the cemetery are those who drowned after a boat ferrying passengers from the steamer SS Lady Darling to shore, on 29 July 1865, was overwhelmed in the surf: Allen Thomas, Robert Turner, Edward Samson, unknown Thompson, John McIntosh, George Hawkins and Henry Heron or Hearn.

== Jewish section ==
There are a small number of Jewish graves in the cemetery, although the Jewish community was of considerable importance in the early settlement of Hokitika. The synagogue on Tancred Street was dedicated on 23 September 1867 by the Reverend Isaac Zachariah. The first Jewish burial in the cemetery was in 1872. John Lazar, who had been Mayor of Adelaide, Provincial Treasurer and a prominent Freemason, was buried in Hokitika in 1879.

== Chinese interments ==
In 1898 the local paper records complaints about Chinese residents' celebrations of the Feast of the Dead, causing "litter and ugly confusion" in the cemetery, the effects of which could be minimised by "setting apart a portion of the cemetery for Chinese interments". In 1902, the remains of fifteen Chinese people were disinterred from Hokitika Cemetery for return to China. Unfortunately these remains were on board the SS Ventnor, which sank after hitting a reef.

== Returned Services ==
According to the New Zealand War Graves Project, Hokitika Cemetery holds four war graves. Three of the soldiers served in World War I and one served in the Vietnam War.

== Hungerford Mausoleum ==
The Hungerford Mausoleum is the largest monument in Hokitika Cemetery and is listed by Heritage New Zealand as a Category II structure. It is the only mausoleum on the West Coast. The mausoleum was built to house the infant sons of Thomas Walter Hungerford and Eliza (née Delany). Both the sons were also named Thomas Walter, and died in Feb 1873 (aged 18 months) and Feb 1874 (aged 10 months). A local court bailiff Thomas Christian (d. 2 April 1878 aged 52) is also buried in the mausoleum.

== Gallery ==
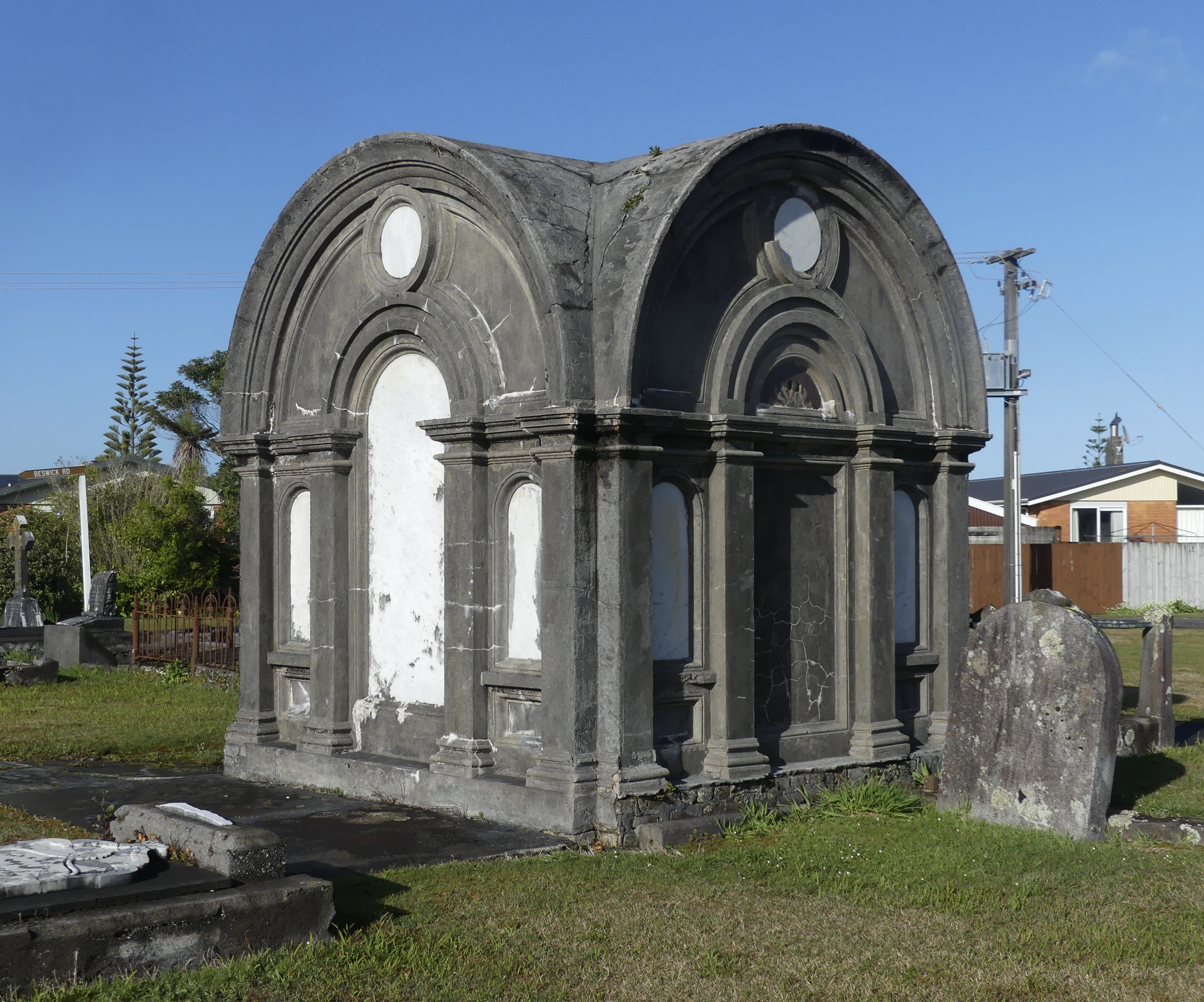
Hungerford Mausoleum

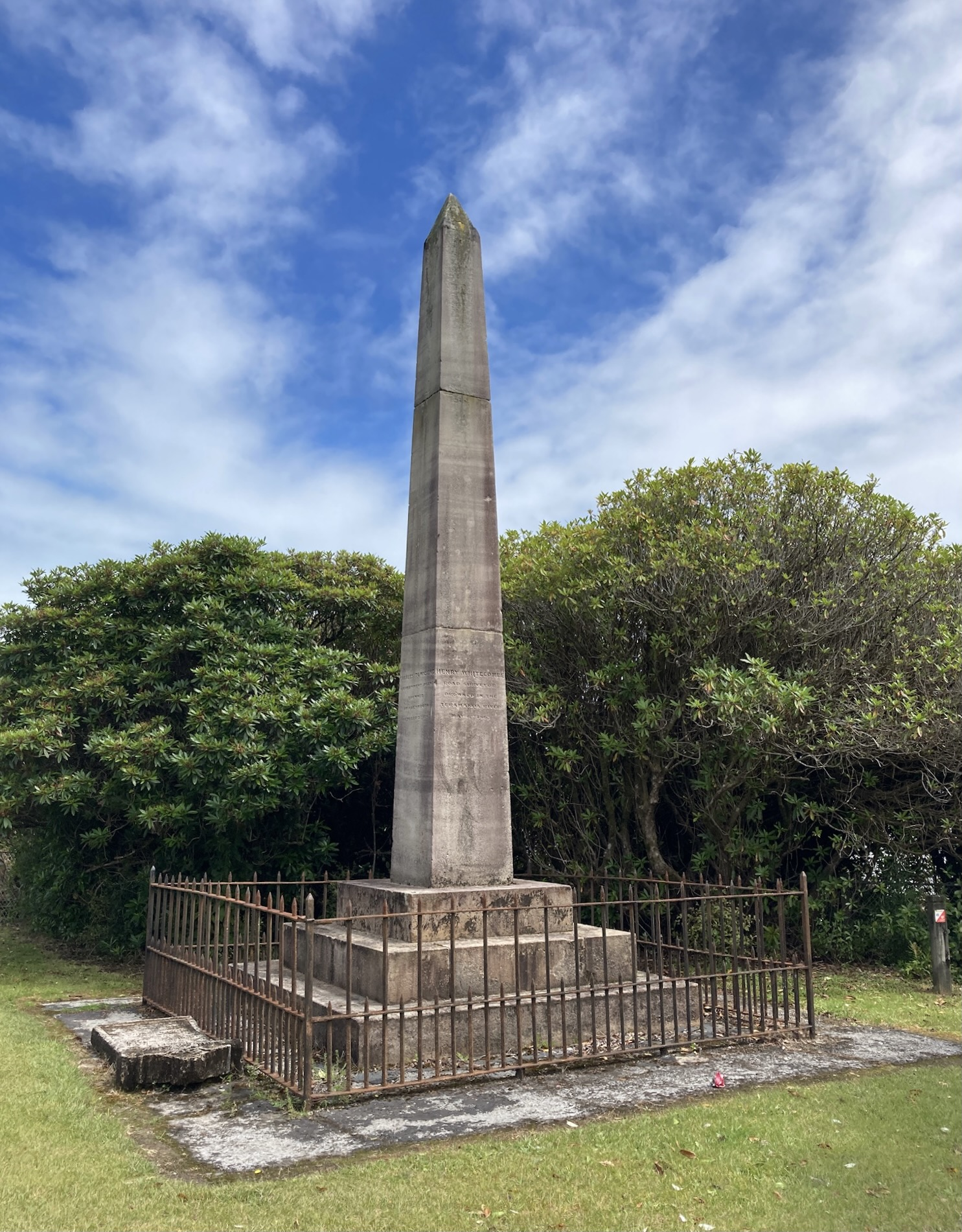
Westland Explorers' Monument

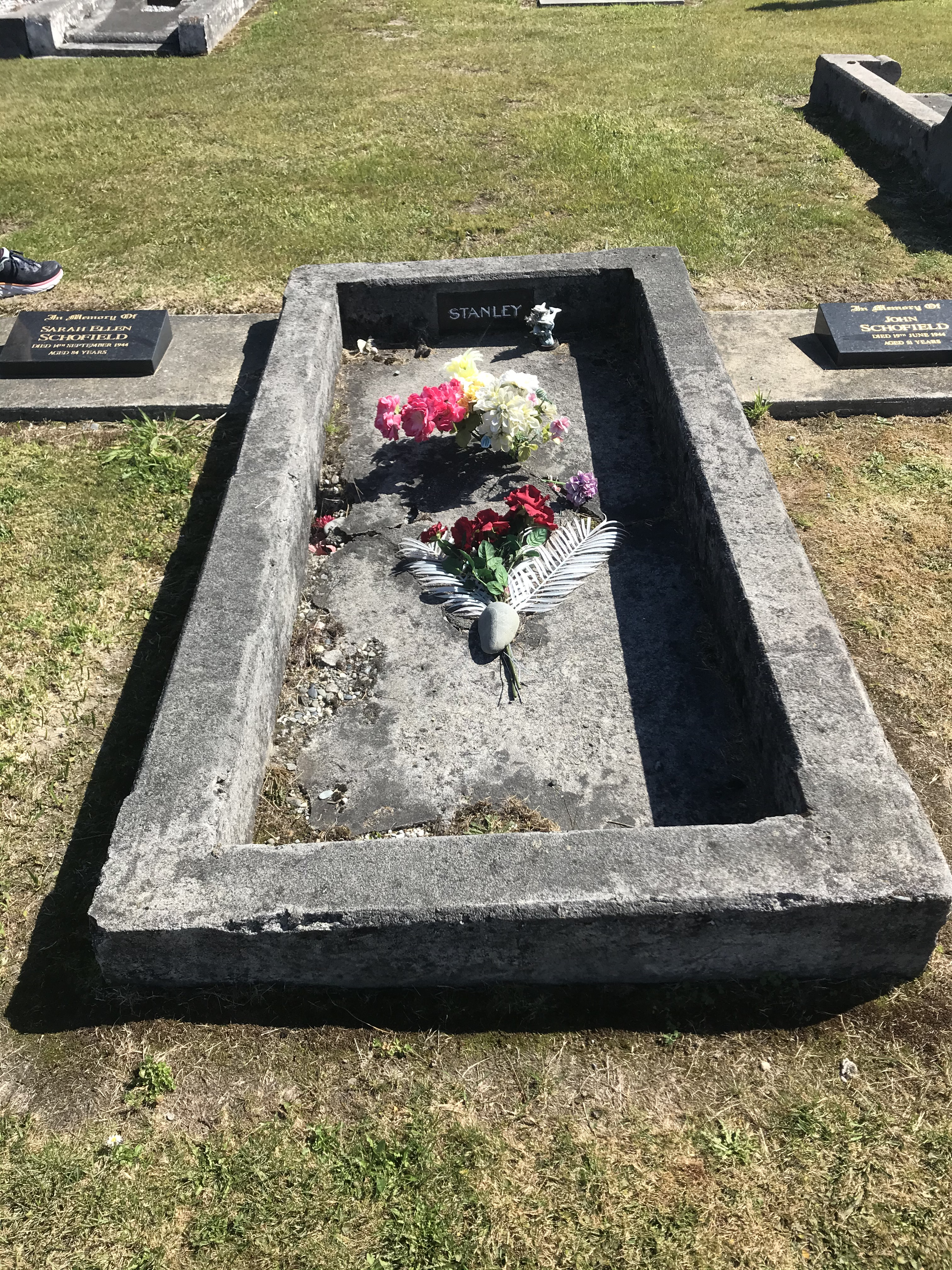
Grave of Stanley Graham

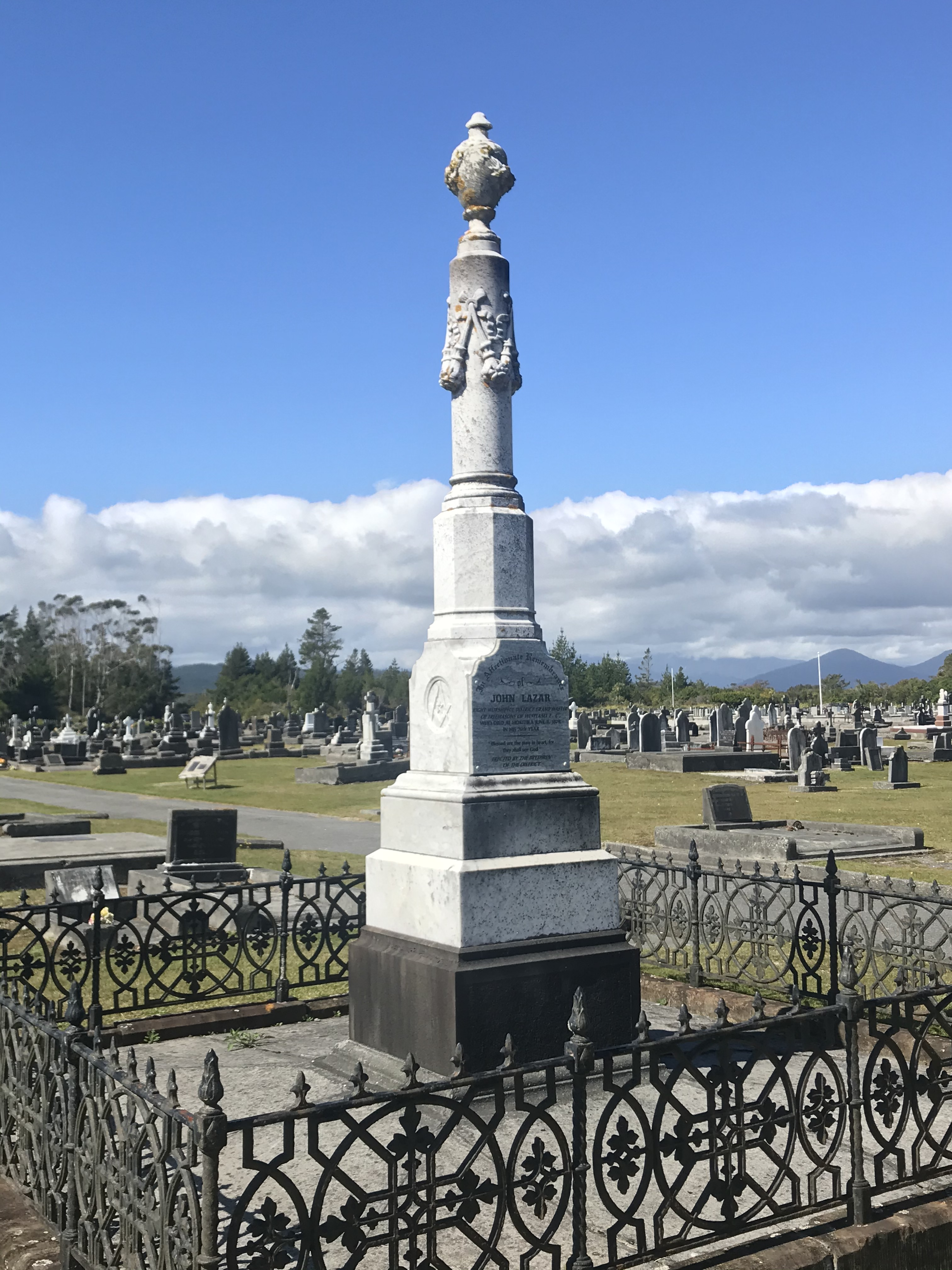
Grave of John Lazar

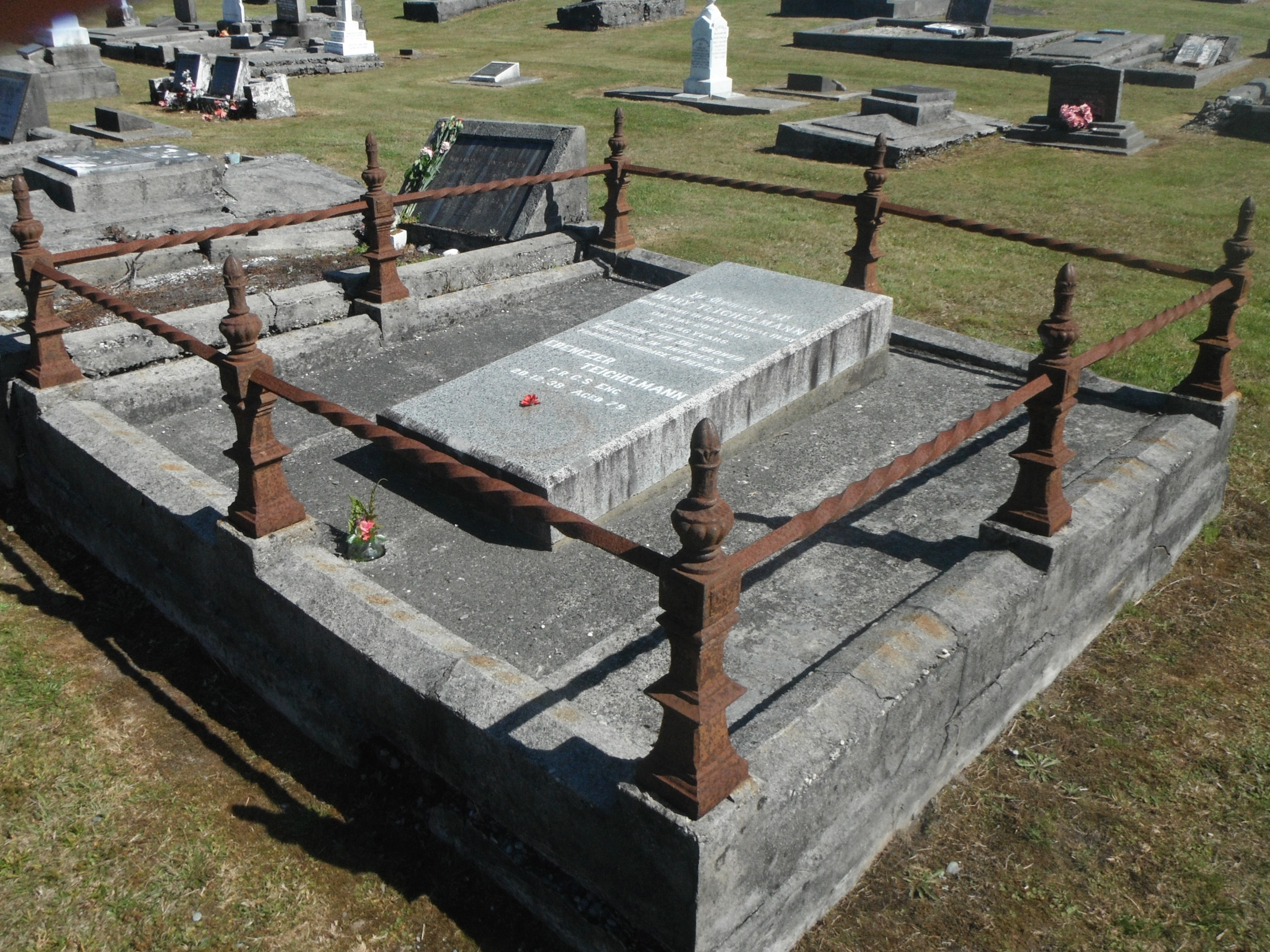
Grave of Mary & Ebenezer Teichelmann

== Notable people buried in Hokitika Cemetery ==
see also Category:Burials at Hokitika Cemetery

- Agnes Addison (née Broomfield; c. 1842–1903), draper
- John Bevan (1837–1911), politician
- Maida Bryant (née Ferguson; 1926–2016), nurse, local politician, and community leader
- Frederick Buglass (1926–2006), telephone technician
- Henry Butland (1872–1956), rugby union player
- Fitzherbert Dermott (1833–1879), physician
- Charlie Douglas (1840–1916), surveyor and explorer
- Stanley Graham (1900–1941), mass murderer, and three of his seven victims
- James Holmes (1831–1910), politician
- Bess Hudson (1875–1961), nurse
- John Lazar (1801–1879), actor and theatre manager in Australia, and mayor of Adelaide from 1855 to 1858
- Herbert Macandrew (1859–1917), physician
- Charles McLean (1892–1965), rugby union player
- Bert Mercer (1886–1944), pioneer aviator
- Henry Michel (1855–1930), politician
- Samuel James Preston (1866–1964), businessman
- Edward St John Daniel (1837–1868), recipient of the Victoria Cross
- Butler Te Koeti (1883–1964), mountaineer, guide, bushman, axeman
- Ebenezer Teichelmann (1859–1938), surgeon, mountaineer, explorer, conservationist and photographer
- Mary Teichelmann (née Bettney; c. 1863–1909)
