= Hokitika Clock Tower =

Memorial and clock tower in New Zealand

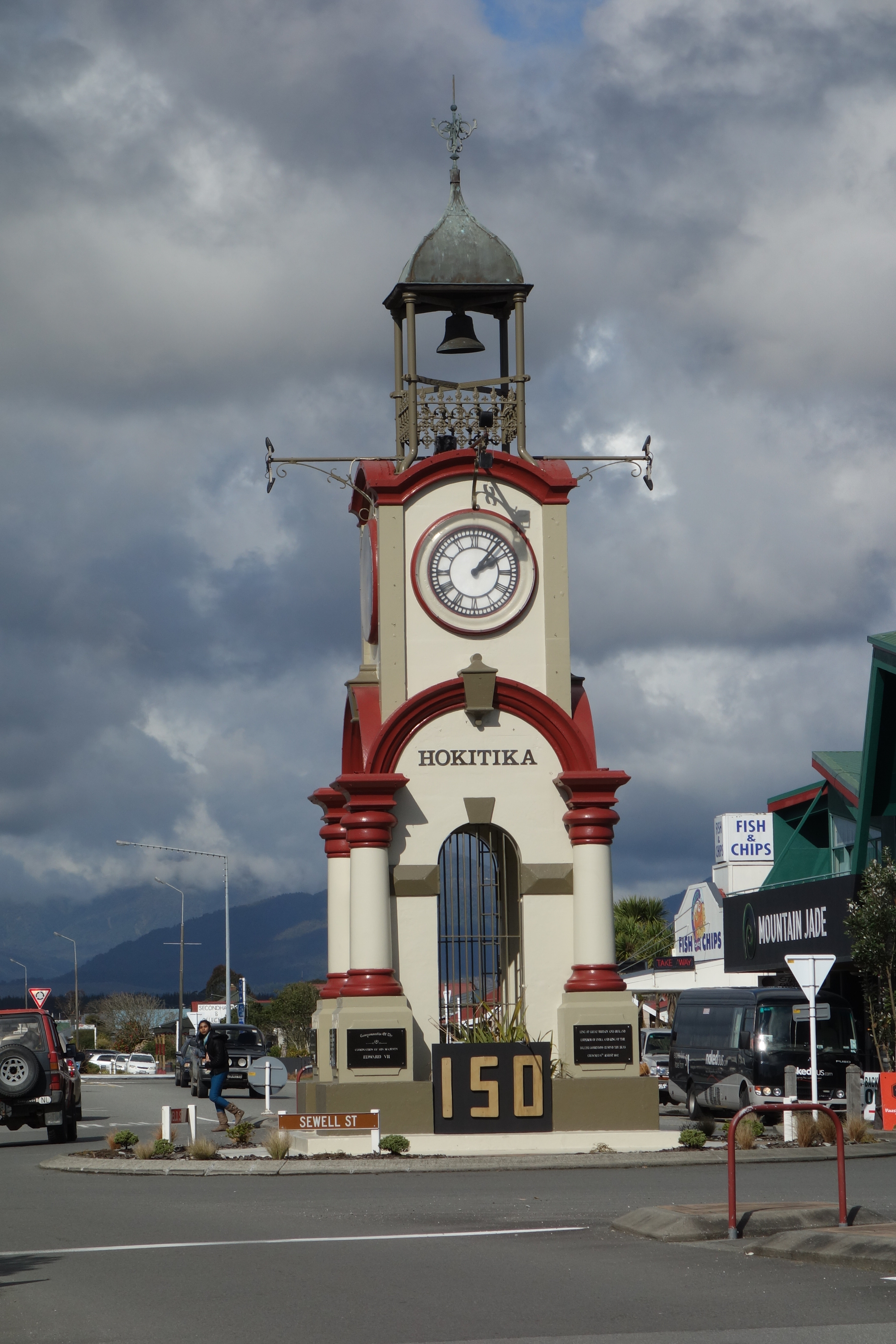
- The Hokitika Clock Tower in 2015 with a "150" sign commemorating the sesquicentennial of Westland the previous year
- Interactive map of Hokitika Clock Tower
- 42°43′05.5″S 170°57′49.5″E
- Location: Hokitika, New Zealand

History
- Built: 1902–1903
- Built for: Queen Victoria's Diamond Jubilee

Site notes
- Architect: William Parkinson
- Governing body: Westland District Council

Heritage New Zealand – Category 2
- Official name: Memorial Clock Tower
- Designated: 21 September 1989
- Reference no.: 5054

The Hokitika Clock Tower, initially called the Westland War Memorial and then the Coronation and War Memorial, is a prominent landmark in Hokitika, New Zealand. The memorial was initiated, fundraised for, and carried out by a committee, to commemorate the region's contribution to the Second Boer War; not just the four local men who had died but all 130 who had gone to war in South Africa. An additional purpose was to provide Hokitika with a town clock.

The driving force behind the initiative was Henry Michel, the mayor of Hokitika at the time. After fundraising had begun, the upcoming coronation of Edward VII was announced and the tower was designated to also commemorate that occasion. Former resident of Hokitika and then premier of the country, Richard Seddon, lent his support, laid the foundation stone, and gave the main speech at the memorial's unveiling, some 17 months later in June 1903. Seddon's wife was a significant fundraiser in Wellington for the project, raising 7% of the cost, and was asked to unveil the tower. The work was undertaken by a stonemason in Auckland specialising in monumental sculpture, with the components all produced in their Auckland workshop and then shipped down for assembly on site. The four-faced town clock was ordered from England and installed by another Aucklander.

The memorial is within a roundabout on the main road into Hokitika and is practically unchanged, apart from the square iron fence that initially surrounded the tower having been replaced by a much larger circular concrete kerb. Since 1989, the tower has been on the national heritage register.

== History ==
Hokitika is located on the West Coast of New Zealand's South Island. Former Hokitika resident, New Zealand premier, and representative of the local Westland electorate, Richard Seddon, agreed for troops to be sent to South Africa in September 1899. This was in support of Britain in their escalating conflict with the South African Republic. The Second Boer War broke out on 11 October 1899 and the Westland region would send 130 men to serve in South Africa, four of whom would be killed.

A Peace Celebration Committee was formed in Hokitika in June 1900 and at their inaugural meeting, it was decided that a memorial should be erected, listing the names of all Westland men who went to war, and to also commemorate the eventual peace. The mayor of Hokitika Borough, Henry Michel, was the driving force behind the memorial. In October 1901, it was decided to place the memorial in the middle of the intersection of Sewell and Weld streets, and to invite the premier to lay the foundation stone early in the coming year. The selected site had previously been used for a memorial for four West Coast pioneers who drowned or were murdered in the 1860s: George Dobson, Charlton Howitt, Henry Whitcombe, and Charles Townsend. This memorial had previously been relocated to Hokitika Cemetery. The borough council granted the request for the site in late November 1901. The following month, a public competition was held for a motto for the monument. The committee received 40 letters and the chosen motto was the Latin phrase Non sibi sed patriae meaning "Not for self, but for country". The chosen motto had been submitted by Miss Vida Perry and she won the one guinea (21 shilling) prize donated by the mayor.

Rated mottos
Motto	Submitter	Committee rating
Non sibi sed patriae (Not for self, but for country)	Miss Vida Perry	prize taker
Dulce et decorum est pro patria mori (It is sweet and fitting to die for the homeland)	Lucy Michel, Hokitika	commended
Post cineres gloria venit (Glory comes after death)	F. H. Rickard, Hokitika	commended
Each life wove a strand in the crimson cord	R. W. Greenwood, Greymouth	commended

On 28 December 1901, Seddon sent a telegraph that he was leaving for Greymouth later that day to spend a week on the West Coast, during which time the foundation stone could be laid. The committee responded that there was insufficient time to prepare and would prefer to wait until his next scheduled visit on 14 February 1902.

In his role as mayor, Michel asked mayors of other West Coast boroughs to also declare Friday, 14 February 1902 a public holiday and the mayors of the boroughs of Brunner, Ross, Greymouth, and Kumara did so. When Seddon arrived in Hokitika, his first official action was to drive the first pile for the railway bridge over the Hokitika River so that the railway could be extended south; what became known as the Ross Branch would reach Ross in 1909. Immediately afterwards, Seddon laid the foundation stone for what was then known as the Westland War Memorial. This was done as a full Masonic ceremony, with Seddon as Acting Grand Master representing the Grand Lodge of New Zealand. Both ceremonies were held in driving rain but there was a "very large attendance" by Westland people. As was usual at the time, the funds for the memorial were fundraised, and Louisa Jane Seddon (the premier's wife) had raised NZ£70 from ex-West Coasters who were living in the country's capital, Wellington.

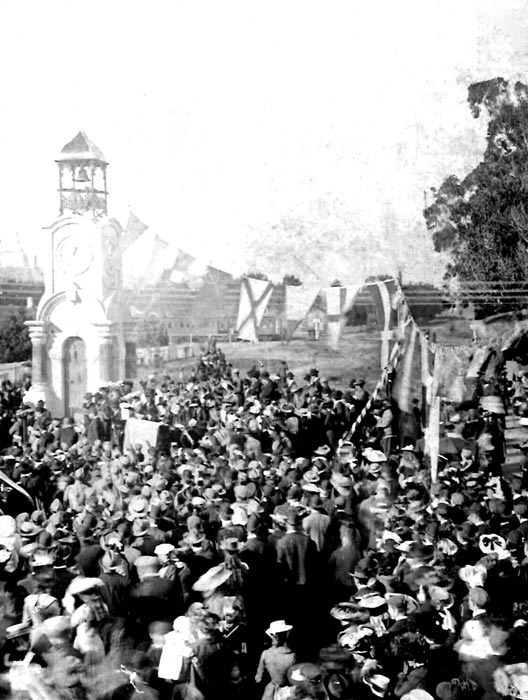
Seddon speaking at the tower's unveiling on 3 June 1903

It took more than a year to erect the monument. In the meantime, Edward VII had his coronation in August 1902 and it was decided to also designate the memorial in honour of this event. It shares the dual function of a Boer War memorial and commemoration of Edward VII's coronation with memorials in Whanganui, Greymouth, Motueka, and Ashburton. The other New Zealand memorial that also commemorates peace, is in Marton. The clock tower was unveiled on 3 June 1903 (the birthday of the Prince of Wales, George Frederick Ernest Albert), with perfect weather and a crowd of 5,000 onlookers; over 3,000 of them arrived by train. The mayor of Hokitika Borough, Michel, spoke first, followed by the unveiling of the clock tower by Seddon's wife. Seddon himself then addressed the crowd with a long speech. Brief speeches were then given by Arthur Clifton (chairman of Westland County), Arthur Guinness (member of the House of Representatives for the Grey electorate), James Holmes (a Hokitika resident and member of the Legislative Council), and Major General James Babington (a Boer War veteran who at the time was the Commandant of the New Zealand Military Forces).

On 21 September 1989, the Hokitika Clock Tower was registered by the New Zealand Historic Places Trust (since renamed Heritage New Zealand) as a Category II heritage structure with registration number 5054. It is a prominent landmark in the town.

== Construction and changes ==
The contract for the design and erection of the memorial was awarded to the stonemason William Parkinson of Auckland. The company had previously produced the Trooper's Memorial and the granite plinth for the Queen Victoria Statue, both located in Auckland's Albert Park. Although the foundation stone was laid in February 1902, it was not until July that year that the final design for the memorial was agreed on. The memorial was built in Auckland and then shipped to Hokitika for installation. A four-faced clock, manufactured by Gillett & Johnston in Croydon, England, and installed by Alfred Bartlett of Auckland, was to function as the town clock. To combine the commemoration of a war memorial with the utility of providing a town clock is unusual in New Zealand. There does not appear to have been any discussion about this dual-purpose in Hokitika. In contrast, the 1950s proposal to add a clock to the Invercargill Troopers' Memorial caused considerable controversy and was only agreed to as a practical means to getting the memorial renovated.

The memorial has a square concrete base 3.4 metres (11 ft) wide and 0.91 metres (3 ft) high. The foundation supports four square bases; one for each corner. Two faces of each square face outwards, with these eight faces having a memorial tablet mounted on them. One of the tablets shows the chosen motto. The square bases support turned columns and turned caps. Above the four columns, arches with a keystone give a striking effect. The square tower above the arches holds the clock, with a circular stone surrounding each clock face. Moulded arches top the masonry part of the tower. A belfry is mounted on top, with iron columns, ironwork friezes, four chiming bells, topped by a copper cupola with a decorative iron finial. Only four other Boer War memorials in New Zealand—Granity, Milton, Lawrence, and Featherston—have a cupola. Except for the pillars, which are made of bluestone, the structure above the base is made of Mount Somers / Te Kiekie stone. To the top of the finial, the tower measures 11.4 metres (37 ft 6 in).

Memorial tablets on northern square base
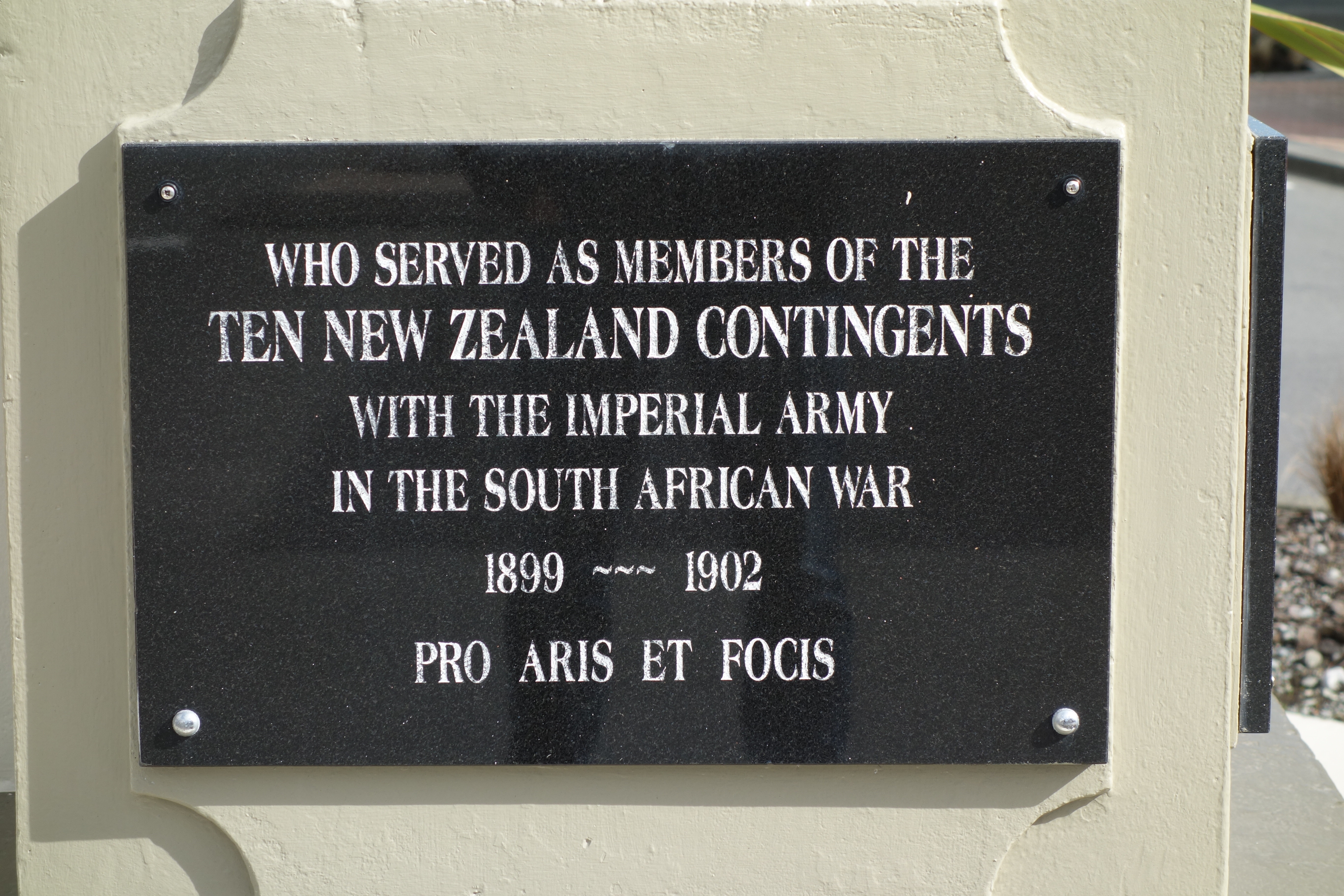
Details for the 130 troopers and the motto

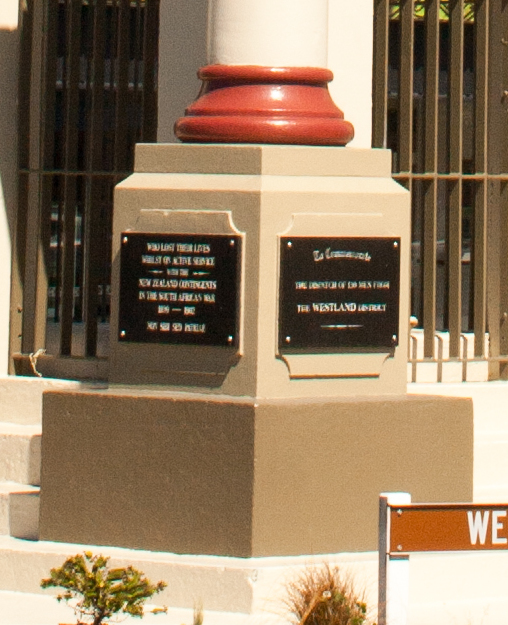
North square with two tablets mounted

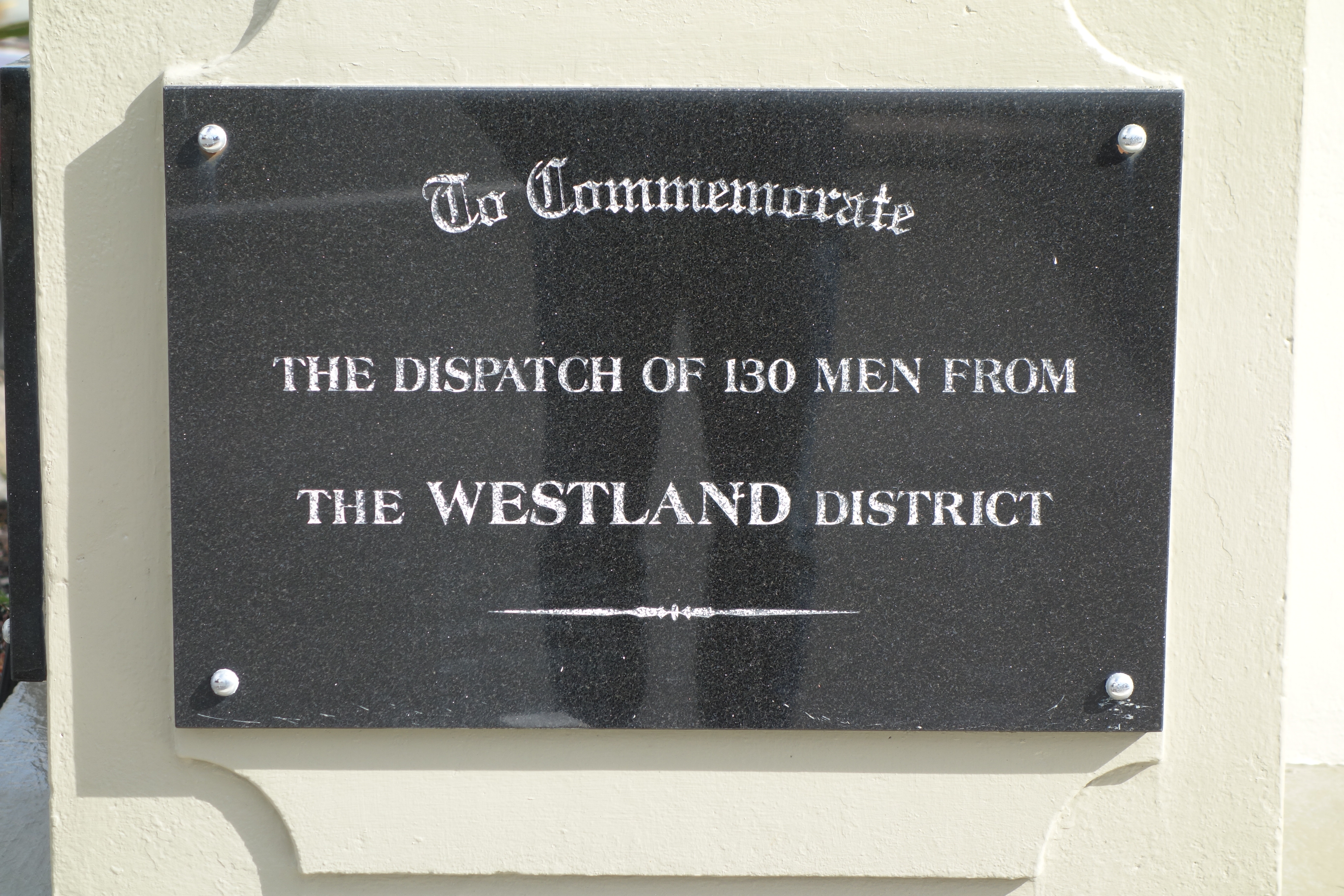
"To commemorate the dispatch of 130 men from the Westland district"

The belfry had started to rust and was replaced in 1957. Initially, there was an iron chain rail at the square base of the footing. The iron chain rail was removed and the base slightly enlarged to form an octagon. A larger, circular ring was later added that supports the operation of the intersection as a roundabout. This concrete ring was later fitted with landscaping.

Changes to the tower's base
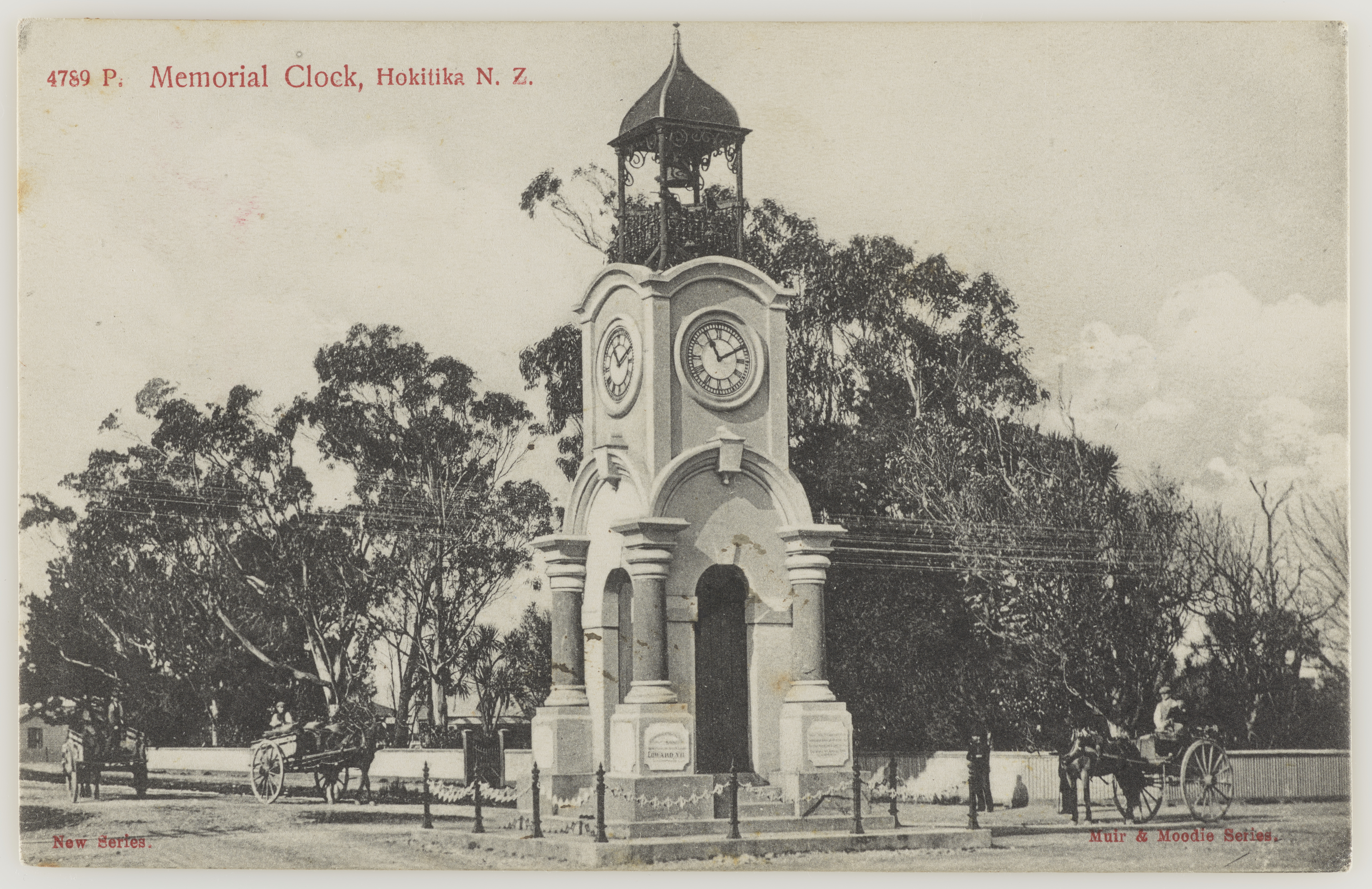
Square base and iron chain fence (photo taken 1915 or earlier)

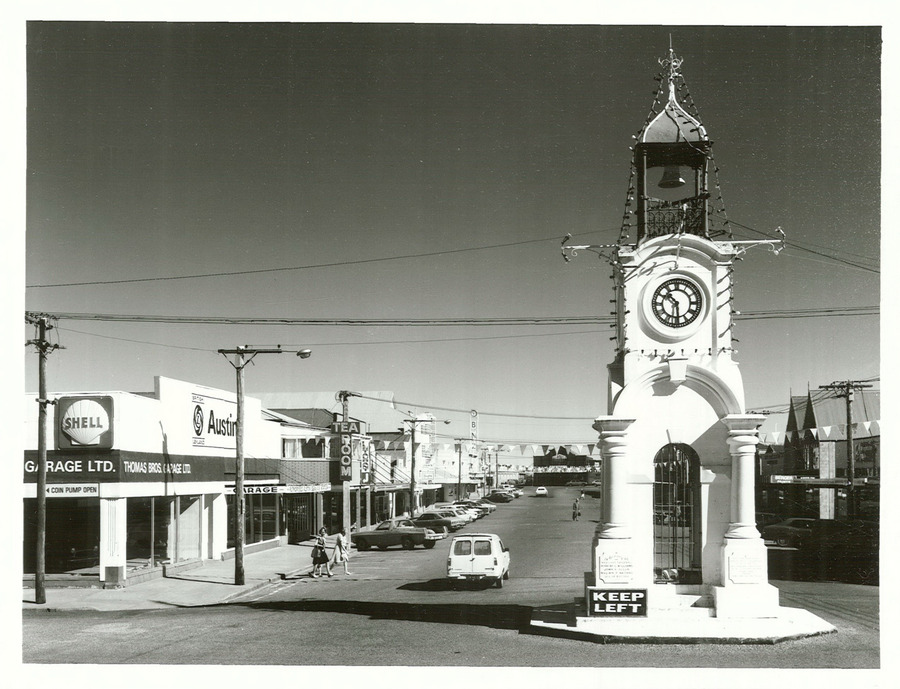
Fence removed and octagonal base (1979 photo)

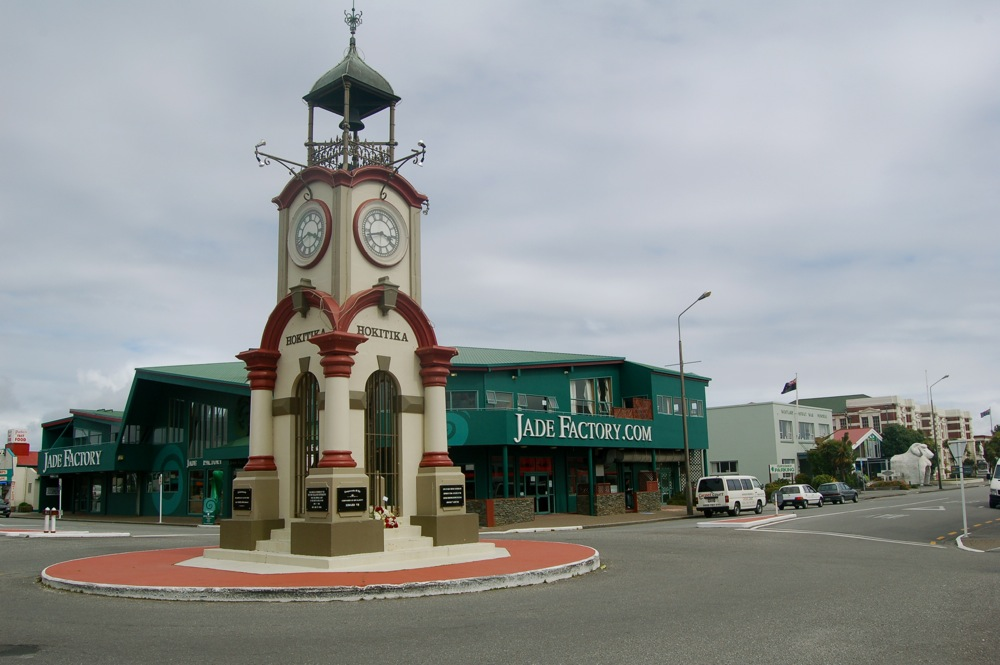
Circular fully sealed base (2007 photo)

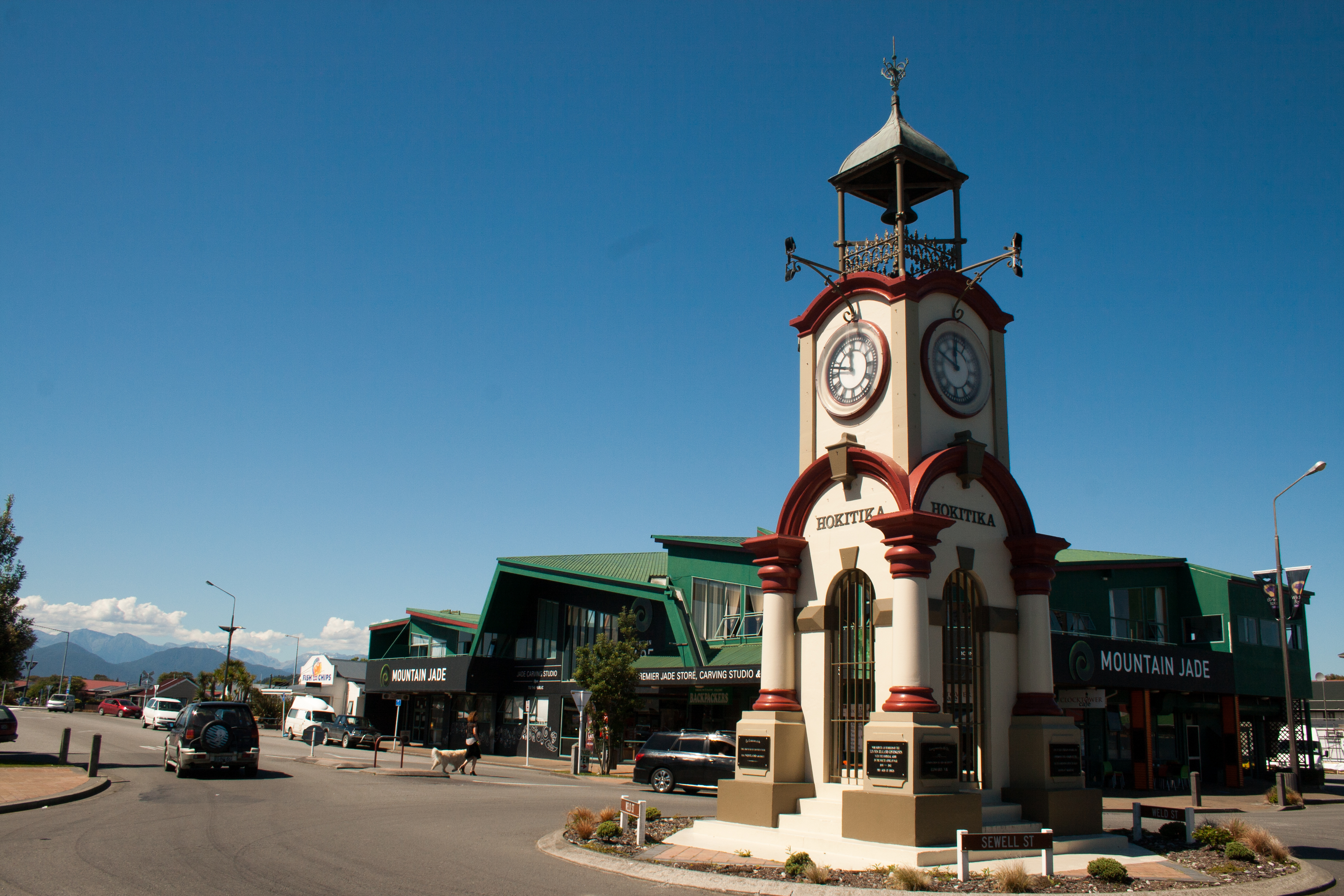
Circular base with landscaping (2016 photo)

== General references ==
- Maclean, Chris; Phillips, Jock (1990). Willis, Debbie (ed.). The Sorrow and the Pride: New Zealand War Memorials. Wellington, N.Z.: Department of Internal Affairs, Historical Branch; GP Books. ISBN 9780477014755. OCLC 24219355.
