= Sir Bonar Neville-Kingdom =

Hoax government official

Sir Bonar Neville-Kingdom is an Internet hoax focusing around statements, Twitters and video interviews by a man purporting to be Permanent Secretary at Large and variously Technology Outreach Czar and Big Data Czar for Her Majesty's Government of the United Kingdom.

== History ==
In 2008, Sir Bonar was cited in a Guardian April 1 hoax article about the British government's "Panopticon" plan, the "National Operational Deterrence and Intelligence Surveillance System" (NODISS). The first year of Twitter postings (@sirbonar) were collected into a book, The Twitters of Sir Bonar Neville-Kingdom. "Sir Bonar" regularly expresses strong support for the war on drugs, for the construction of physical protection measures around Whitehall ("Bonar's Bollards") and for all forms of total population surveillance. For example, he weighed in in favor of the Communications Data Bill 2012
