= Paul Bonar =

Scottish footballer

Personal information
- Date of birth: 28 December 1976 (age 49)
- Place of birth: Glasgow, Scotland
- Position: Defender

Youth career
- Milngavie Wanderers

Senior career*
Years	Team	Apps	(Gls)
1995–1996	Airdrieonians	12	(0)
1996–1997	Raith Rovers	17	(1)
1997–1998	Ayr United	10	(0)
1998–2000	Sligo Rovers		
2000–2001	Kirkintilloch Rob Roy		
2001–2002	Albion Rovers	21	(2)
2003–2004	Stenhousemuir	12	(0)
- Kirkintilloch Rob Roy

International career
1996	Scotland U21	4	(0)
- * Club domestic league appearances and goals

Paul Bonar (born 28 December 1976) is a Scottish former professional footballer, who played for Airdrieonians, Raith Rovers, Ayr United, Albion Rovers and Stenhousemuir in the Scottish Football League.
