= Westland Province =

Former Province of New Zealand in South Island

Coordinates: 42°42′56″S 170°58′5″E

Westland
- Provinces of New Zealand
- Westland Province within New Zealand post 1873
- Country: New Zealand
- Island: South Island
- Established: 1873
- Abolished: 1876
- Seat: Hokitika

The Westland Province was a province of New Zealand from 1873 until the abolition of provincial government in 1876. The capital was Hokitika.

== Area and history ==
The area was part of Canterbury Province when the provinces were created in 1853. By 1868, triggered by the population growth associated with the West Coast gold rush, the West Coast region was separated from Canterbury Province with the formation of the County of Westland. The boundary to Canterbury was defined as the crest of the Southern Alps / Kā Tiritiri o te Moana.

This county was not a true province, as it had all the administrative powers of a provincial council, but saw the legislative powers remain with Parliament in Wellington. Members of Parliament were not happy with having to spend their time on local legislation, and in 1873 the government elevated the county to full provincial status – the last of the 10 New Zealand provinces to be established.

The province covered an area roughly the same as the present day Westland District, on the West Coast of New Zealand. The boundary with the Nelson Province was, as per George Grey's proclamation from February 1853, the Grey and Arnold Rivers, Lake Brunner, and from there to the headwaters of the Hurunui River through then virtually unknown territory.

When John Hall resigned as Westland county chairman the government appointed James Bonar. Bonar was chairman during the period of the Fenian riots and is credited with "great tact in handling that explosive situation".

In March 1868, Bonar swore in 640 special constables to suppress an Irish nationalist procession in Hokitika. Bonar was replaced by Conrad Hoos, but later—when on 1 December 1873 Westland split from Canterbury Province—Bonar resumed, but as the provincial superintendent.

== Anniversary Day ==
New Zealand law still provides for a provincial anniversary day.

Provincial Anniversary Day
Provincial District	includes	Actual Day	Observance Day
Westland	Hokitika, Greymouth	December 1	Monday nearest to the actual day (Greymouth)

== Superintendents and officials ==
The Westland Province had one Superintendent:

No.	from	to	Superintendent
1	17 Jan 1874	1 Jan 1877	James Bonar

In 1874 John Lazar, former Hokitika Town Clerk and Country Treasurer, was appointed Provincial Treasurer.

== Legislation ==
No legislation passed by the Westland Provincial Council has survived to the present time.
