= Jim Bonar =

Scottish footballer

Personal information
- Date of birth: 13 July 1862
- Place of birth: Glasgow, Scotland
- Date of death: 1924 (aged 61–62)
- Position: Forward

Senior career*
| Years | Team | Apps | (Gls) |
| 1883–1884 | Thornliebank | | |
| 1884–1889 | Accrington | 17 | (0) |
- * Club domestic league appearances and goals

James Bonar (13 July 1862 – 1924) was a Scottish footballer who played in The Football League for Accrington.

== Early career ==
Jim Bonar started his football career in Renfrewshire in 1883. He joined a club called Thornliebank who had reached the Scottish Cup final three years earlier. Jim Bonar signed for Accrington on 1 July 1884. For four seasons Accrington, like most football clubs played "friendly" matches and the only serious competition they took part in was the FA Cup.

== Season 1888–1889 ==
Accrington were one of the founder members of the League and (as recorded by Metcalf and ENFA) like nine other clubs played the first ever League matches in the world on 8 September 1888. Jim Bonar made his League debut on 8 September 1888 at Anfield, the then home of Everton. Accrington lost the match 2–1. Metcalf has reproduced a press article on the match from the Liverpool Mercury published on 10 September 1888. Bonar was mentioned as having shots on goal in both halves but without success. Jim Bonar appeared in 17 of the 22 matches played by Accrington in 1888-1889 season. As a forward he played in a forward line that scored 48 League goals and the club finished seventh in the League table Jim Bonar' only season in top-flight football was described by Metcalf as "a professional who only played one season but failed to score a single goal in 17 games."

== 1889–1924 ==
Jim Bonar left Accrington in 1889. There is no record of when he stopped playing football and any other career he pursued. He died in 1924, aged 60 or 61.
