= James Bonar (moderator) =

James Bonar or Bonor (c. 1570 – c. 1655) was a Church of Scotland minister who served as Moderator of the General Assembly in 1644. He was a strong supporter of the Covenanters. He was a Resolutioner and member of the Moderate Party within the church.

== Life ==
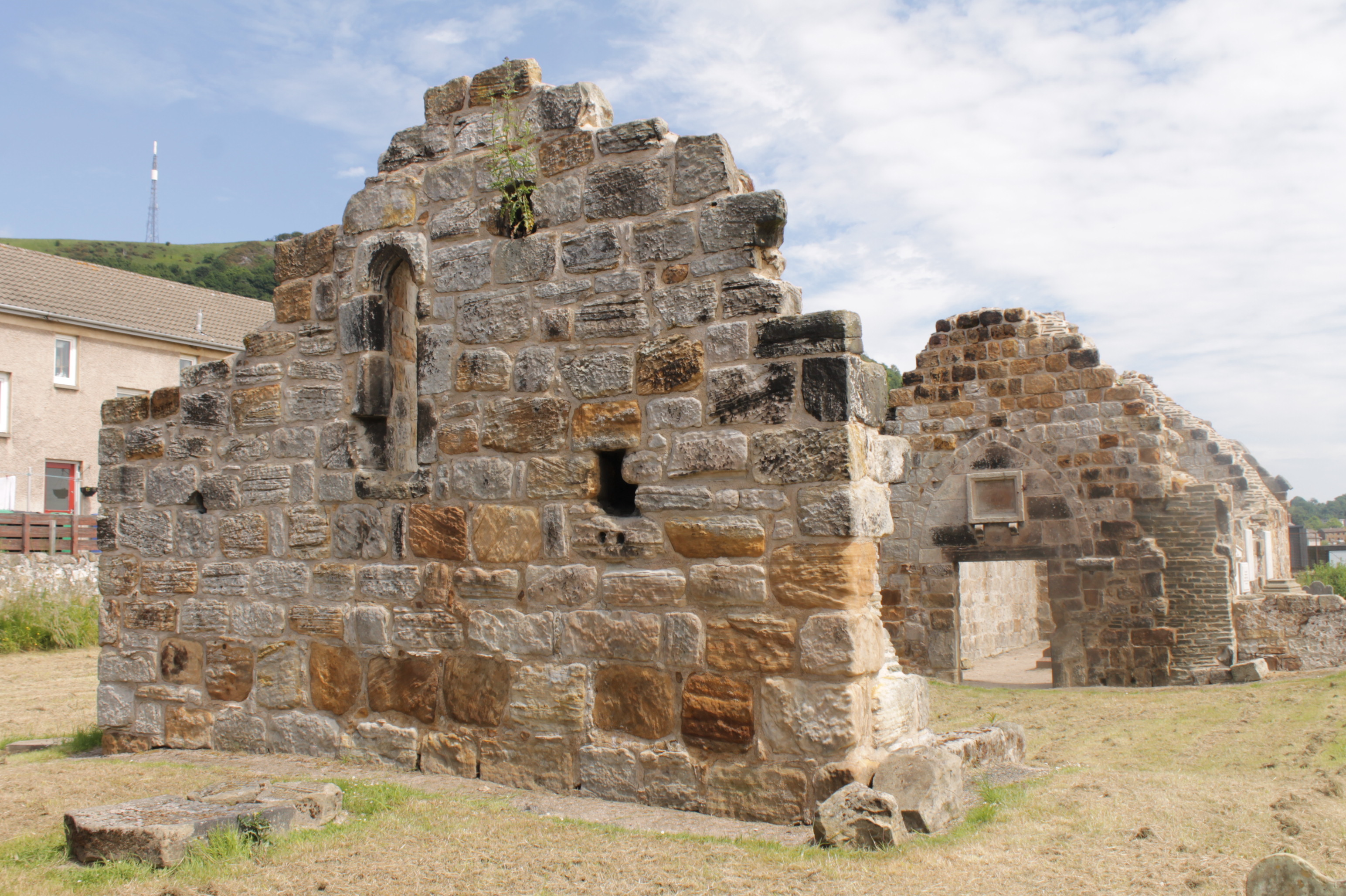
Old Kirkton church ruins, Burntisland

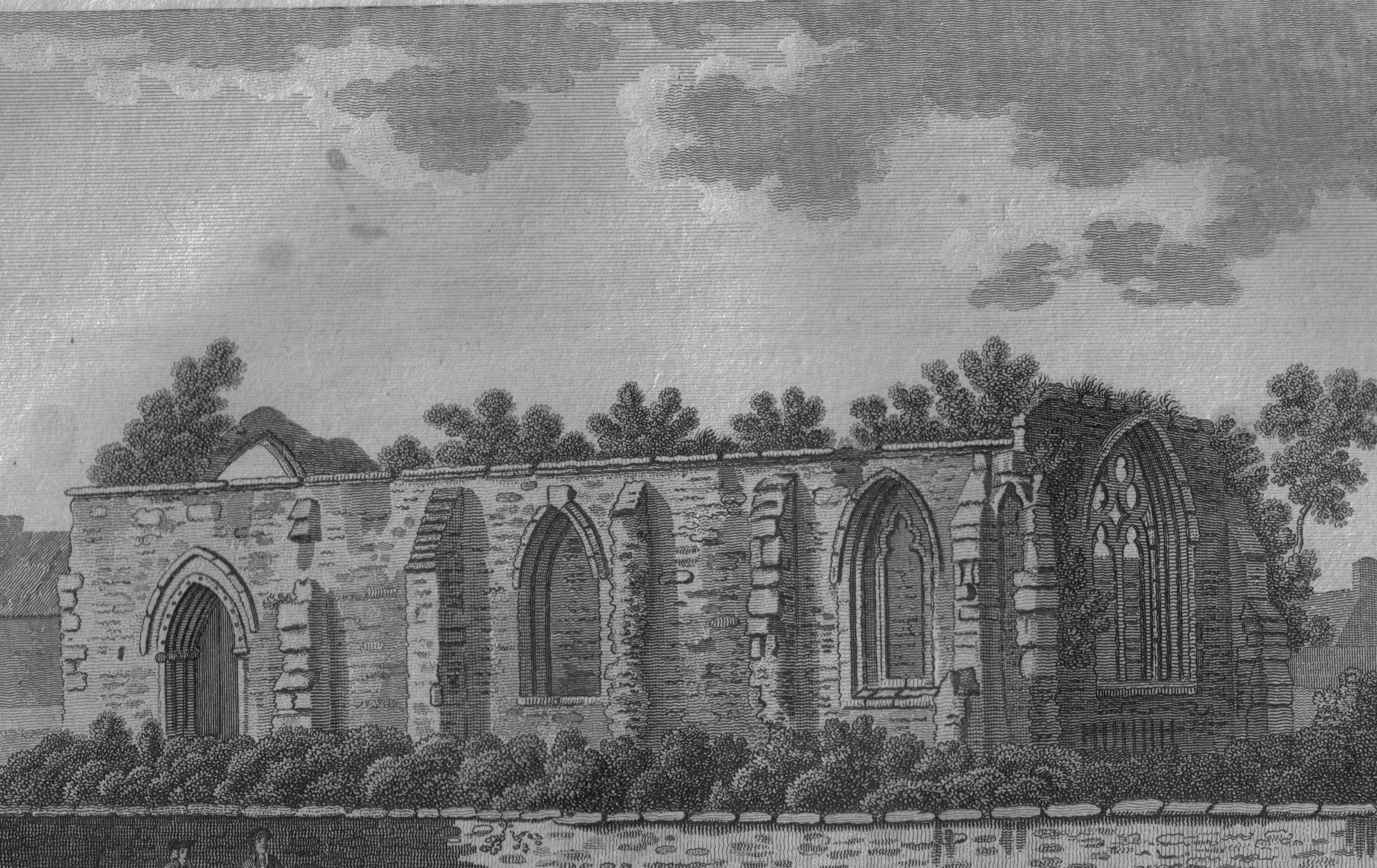
The ruins of old Maybole Church c.1800

Little is known of his early life. He graduated MA from St Andrews University in 1601.

His ecclesiastical life began as a reader at Burntisland Parish Church (now known as Old Kirkton Church) around 1603. In 1608, he was appointed minister of Maybole and was formally "presented to the vicarage" by King James VI in June 1614. He appears to have added a new aisle at his own expense at Maybole to accommodate a growing congregation.

He was one of three ministers selected to represent the Presbytery of Dumbarton at the General Assembly that met in Glasgow in 1638. Bonar was given a number of important functions in the Assembly. Due to his age and experience, he was appointed to sit on a committee to consider the Kirk's historical records. Bonar was part of a group tasked with examining the University of Glasgow that met after the assembly had closed.

Bonar attended the General Assemblies in 1642, 1643 and 1644, 1645 and 1646.

At the General Assembly in 1644, Bonar was elected Moderator of the General Assembly of the Church of Scotland.

In 1642 he was ordered to reinstate the minister Rev Gilbert Power to the parish of Stoneykirk (at least a days journey to the south-west). However, a number of women from the village armed with clubs and stones, led by a man, Fergus McDougall, prevented him from preaching. The reason for their anger is unclear, but the experience permanently scarred Bonar and he had a long and dangerous fever. Although the General Assembly considered a trial of the rioters this did not happen.

He died around 1655.

== Family ==
He married twice: firstly a daughter of Duncan Crauford of Nether Skeldoun. She died in 1623. He then married Helen Kennedy daughter of Thomas Kennedy of Drummurchie. He is not known to have had any children.

== Publications ==
- Epitaph on Mr William Birnie, Minister of Ayr
