= James Bonar (politician) =

New Zealand merchant and politician

James Alexander Bonar
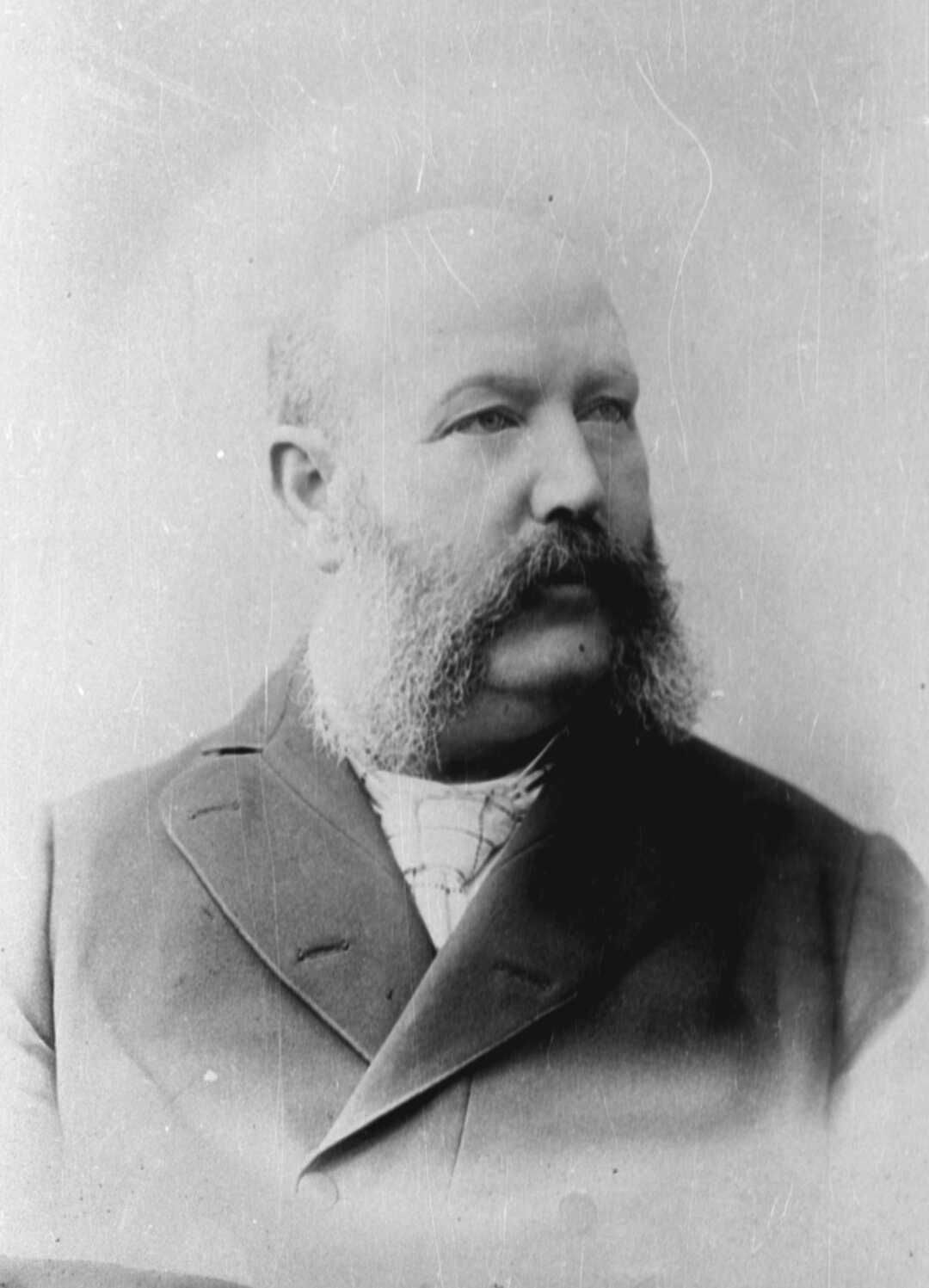
- Portrait (1894)
- Born: James Alexander Bonar; 12 June 1840
- Died: 7 November 1901 (aged 61)
- Resting place: Hokitika Cemetery
- Occupations: Merchant, shipping agent, company director and politician
- Spouse: Elliott Margaret Bell
- Relatives: 4 sons and 1 daughter

James Alexander Bonar (12 June 1840 – 7 November 1901) was a New Zealand merchant, shipping agent, company director and politician. He was born in Edinburgh, Midlothian, Scotland on 12 June 1840. He was a member of the Westland County Council during the whole time of its existence, and was the county council's second chairman. He was the first Mayor of Hokitika, represented Hokitika on the Canterbury Provincial Council, a member of the Legislative Council (27 June 1868 – 7 November 1901), and the only Superintendent of Westland Province.

He married on 19 October 1875, Elliott Margaret Bell; they had four sons and one daughter. He is buried at Hokitika Cemetery.
