= James Bonar (economist) =

Scottish economist (1852–1941)

- Bonar in 1932
- Born: 27 September 1852
- Died: 18 January 1941 (aged 88)

Academic background
- Education: University of Glasgow; Balliol College, Oxford

Academic work
- School or tradition: History of Economic Thought; Austrian School

James Bonar (27 September 1852 – 18 January 1941) was a Scottish civil servant, political economist and historian of economic thought.

== Biography ==
He was born in Perth. He was brought up, from the age of four, in Glasgow where his father was a Church of Scotland Minister. This clerical background extends to two uncles, both ministers who 'came out' in the disruption of 1843, both later serving terms as Moderator of the Free Church General Assembly. From Glasgow Academy Bonar graduated MA in Mental Philosophy from Glasgow University in 1874. He followed the same lengthy undergraduate career that Adam Smith pursued more than a century before gaining a Snell Exhibition to Balliol College, Oxford from which he graduated with a first in 1877.

A major early influence was the moral philosopher, Edward Caird: first as Professor at Glasgow and then as Master of Balliol. Together with his family background that influence helps explain Bonar's decision to spend the next three years teaching economics in the newly established University Extension Movement in the East End of London. In 1881 he began a career in the civil service only retiring (to live in Hampstead) from his final position, as Deputy Manager of the Ottawa branch of the Royal mint, in 1919 at the age of 67.

In 1886, with J. H. Muirhead and others, Bonar was instrumental in establishing the London Ethical Society, the first ethical society in the UK. Although the LES became the London School of Ethics and Philosophy in 1897 (which was later absorbed in the London School of Economics), it was the first of a growing number of ethical societies which prompted the formation of the Union of Ethical Societies in 1896, known today as Humanists UK.

He was awarded an LLD from Glasgow University in 1887, and an honorary doctorate from Cambridge University in 1935.

== Major publications ==
- Parson Malthus, 1881.
- Malthus and his Work, 1885.
- Letters of David Ricardo to Thomas Robert Malthus: 1810–1823 (ed.), 1887.
- "Austrian economists and their view of value", 1888, QJE
- Bonar, James (1891). "The value of labor in relation to economic theory". The Quarterly Journal of Economics. 5 (2): 137–164. doi:10.2307/1882969. JSTOR 1882969.
- Philosophy and Political Economy, 1893 (3rd ed. 1922; 4th ed. 1927)
- А Catalogue of Adam Smith's Library, 1894.
- Bonar, J (1898). "The Centenary of Malthus". The Economic Journal. 8 (30): 206–208. doi:10.2307/2957360. JSTOR 2957360.
- Letters of David Ricardo to Hutches Trower and Others: 1811–1823 (with J.H. Hollander), 1899.
- Disturbing Elements in the Study and Teaching of Political Economy, 1911.
- "Knapp's theory of money", 1922, EJ
- Ricardo's Ingot Plan, 1923, EJ
- "Memories of F.Y. Edgeworth", 1926, EJ
- The Tables Turned. A Lecture and Dialogue on Adam Smith and the Classical Economists. London: Macmillan & Company. 1931.
- "Ricardo on Malthus", 1929, EJ
- Theories of Population from Raleigh to Arthur Young, 1931
