= Hokitika Borough =

Former borough council in New Zealand

Coordinates: 42°42′56″S 170°58′5″E

Hokitika Borough map

The Hokitika Borough was the borough council covering the urban part of the town of Hokitika, New Zealand between 1867 and 1989, when Hokitika Borough and Westland County merged to form Westland District.

== History ==
During the time of the West Coast gold rush, Hokitika became the capital for the West Coast of the South Island. A Town Improvement Committee was established in 1865. This committee was succeeded by a new Municipal Corporation, for which a nomination meeting was held on 25 September 1866, where there was great confusion about the correct electoral procedure. As more nominations were received than were positions available, an election was held on 3 October. Many members of the Town Improvement Committee did not make the election, and the councillors elected were W. Hungerford, James Bonar, Charles Williams, James R. Anderson, R. Ecclesfield, A. Cumming, William Shaw, F. L. Clarke, and J. Fitzsimmons. The councillors first met on 9 October 1866 and elected James Bonar as their first chairman.

The Hokitika Borough was originally formed under the Hokitika Municipal Corporation Ordinance, 1866, an act passed by the Canterbury Provincial Council. The ordinance was passed on 27 December 1866, and assented by the Superintendent, William Sefton Moorhouse, on 29 December 1866. One of the purposes of that ordinance was to declare the election of the first nine councillors as valid.

The Municipal Corporations Act, 1867 was passed by the New Zealand Parliament, and this allowed for towns to be constituted a borough, and Hokitika Borough was incorporated on 24 August 1868. The area of the borough was 1,280 acres (5.2 km^{2}).
