= List of New Zealand electorates =

Electoral districts to New Zealand Parliament

Electorates in New Zealand were initially created for election to the first parliament in 1853. Since then there have been numerous changes, perhaps the largest being in 1996 for the introduction of MMP.

== General electorates ==
Electorate name	Region	First established	Last abolished	Became
Akaroa	Canterbury	1853	1893	Merged into Ellesmere.
Albany	Auckland	1978	2002	East Coast Bays, with part merging into Helensville.
Aoraki	Canterbury and Otago	1996	2008	Rangitata and Waitaki
Arch Hill	Auckland	1946	1954	
Ashburton	Canterbury	1881	1993	
Ashley	Canterbury	1866	1902	Hurunui
Auckland	Auckland	1853	1905	Auckland Central, Auckland East, and Auckland West
Auckland Central	Auckland	1887	Current	
Auckland East	Auckland	1861	1946	
Auckland North	Auckland	1881	1890	
Auckland Suburbs	Auckland	1928	1946	
Auckland West	Auckland	1861	1946	
Avon	Canterbury	1861	1996	
Awarua	Southland	1881	1996	
Banks Peninsula	Canterbury	1996	Current	
Bay of Islands	Northland	1853	1996	Far North
Bay of Plenty	Bay of Plenty	1893	Current	
Birkenhead	Auckland	1969	1996	Northcote
Botany	Auckland	2008	Current	
Brooklyn	Wellington	1946	1954	Island Bay
Bruce	Otago	1861	1922	
Buller	West Coast and Tasman	1871	1972	Split into West Coast and Tasman
Caversham	Otago	1866	1908	
Chalmers (Port Chalmers)	Otago	1866	1938	Dunedin Central, Dunedin North and Oamaru
Cheviot	Canterbury	1858	1890	
Christchurch (Town of Christchurch, then City of Christchurch)	Canterbury	1853	1905	
Christchurch Central	Canterbury	1946	Current	
Christchurch Country	Canterbury	1853	1860	
Christchurch East	Canterbury	1871	Current	
Christchurch North	Canterbury	1881	1996	Waimakiriri
Christchurch South	Canterbury	1881	1946	
Christchurch West	Canterbury	1871	1875	
City of Dunedin (originally Town of Dunedin)	Otago	1853	1905	Dunedin Central, Dunedin North and Dunedin South
Clevedon	Auckland	1987	2008	
Clive	Hawke's Bay	1861	1881	
Clutha	Otago	1866	1996	
Clutha-Southland	Southland and Otago	1996	2020	Southland
Coleridge	Canterbury	1866	1887	
Collingwood	Tasman	1861	1881	
Coromandel	Waikato	1881	Current	
Courtenay	Tasman	1902	1908	
Dunedin	Otago	2020	Current	
Dunedin Central	Otago	1881	1984	Dunedin West
Dunedin Country	Otago	1853	1860	
Dunedin East	Otago	1881	1890	
Dunedin North	Otago	1905	2020	Dunedin
Dunedin South	Otago	1881	2020	Taieri
Dunedin Suburbs	Otago	1890	1893	
Dunedin and Suburbs North	Otago	1863	1866	
Dunedin and Suburbs South	Otago	1862	1866	
Dunedin West	Otago	1881	1996	Dunedin South
Dunstan	Tasman	1871	1890	
East Cape	Gisborne and Bay of Plenty	1978	1993	Eastern Bay of Plenty
East Coast	Gisborne and Bay of Plenty	1871	Current	
East Coast Bays	Auckland	1972	Current	
Eastern Bay of Plenty	Bay of Plenty	1993	1996	
Eastern Hutt	Wellington	1978	1996	
Eden	Auckland	1871	1996	Epsom
Egmont	Taranaki	1871	1978	Waitotara
Ellesmere	Canterbury	1861	1928	
Epsom	Auckland	1996	Current	
Far North	Northland	1993	1996	Northland
Fendalton	Canterbury	1946	1996	
Foxton	Manawatū-Whanganui and Wellington	1881	1890	
Franklin	Auckland	1861	1996	
Franklin North	Auckland	1881	1890	
Franklin South	Auckland	1881	1890	
Geraldine	Canterbury	1875	1911	
Gisborne	Gisborne	1908	1996	Mahia
Glenfield	Auckland	1984	1996	
Gladstone	Canterbury	1866	1890	
Grey	West Coast	1890	1919	
Grey and Bell	Taranaki	1853	1881	
Grey Lynn	Auckland	1902	1978	
Greymouth	West Coast	1881	1890	
Grey Valley	West Coast	1871	1881	Greymouth and Inangahua
Halswell	Canterbury	1890	1893	
Hamilton	Waikato	1922	1969	
Hamilton East	Waikato	1972	Current	
Hamilton West	Waikato	1969	Current	
Hampden	Otago	1861	1870	Wakatipu and ?
Hastings	Hawke's Bay	1946	1996	
Hauraki	Auckland and Waikato	1928	1996	Coromandel
Hawera	Taranaki	1896	1908	
Hawke	Hawke's Bay	1858	1860	
Hawkes Bay	Hawke's Bay	1881	1996	Tukituki
Heathcote	Canterbury	1861	1893	
Helensville	Auckland	1978	2020	Kaipara ki Mahurangi
Henderson	Auckland	1969	1996	Waipareira
Heretaunga	Wellington	1954	1996	Remutaka (spelled as Rimutaka until 2020)
Hobson	Northland	1946	1996	Whangarei (existing) and Northland (new)
Hokitika	West Coast	1871	1890	
Hokonui	Southland	1881	1890	
Horowhenua	Manawatū-Whanganui	1978	1996	
Howick	Auckland	1993	1996	Manukau East
Hunua	Auckland	1978	2020	Papakura and Port Waikato
Hurunui	Canterbury	1902	1963	Rangiora
Hutt	Wellington	1853	1978	
Hutt South	Wellington	1996	Current	
Ilam	Canterbury	1996	Current	
Inangahua	West Coast	1881	1896	Absorbed into Buller
Invercargill	Southland	1866	Current	
Island Bay	Wellington	1946	1996	Rongotai and Wellington Central
Kaiapoi	Canterbury	1861	1946	
Kaikōura	Marlborough and Canterbury	1996	Current	
Kaimai	Waikato and Bay of Plenty	1978	1996	Tauranga, Bay of Plenty, and Coromandel
Kaipara	Auckland	1902	1996	
Kaipara ki Mahurangi	Auckland	2020	Current	
Kapiti	Wellington	1972	1996	
Karapiro	Waikato	1996	2002	
Karori	Wellington	1946	1978	Ohariu
Kelston	Auckland	2014	Current	
King Country	Waikato	1972	1996	
Kumara	West Coast	1881	1890	
Lincoln	Canterbury	1881	1890	
Linwood	Canterbury	1887	1890	
Lyttelton	Canterbury	1853	1996	Banks Peninsula
Mahia	Gisborne, Hawke's Bay and Bay of Plenty	1996	1999	East Coast
Mana	Wellington	1996	Current	
Manawatu	Manawatū-Whanganui	1871	1996	
Māngere	Auckland	1969	Current	
Manuherikia	Otago	1866	1870	
Manukau	Auckland	1881	1978	
Manukau East	Auckland	1996	2020	Panmure-Ōtāhuhu
Manurewa	Auckland	1963	Current	
Maramarua	Waikato and ?	1987	1993	
Marlborough	Marlborough	1938	1996	
Marsden	Northland	1858	1972	Whangarei
Masterton	Wellington	1887	1946	Wairarapa
Matakana	Waikato	1993	1996	Coromandel
Matamata	Waikato	1978	1996	
Mataura	Southland	1866	1946	
Maungakiekie	Auckland	1996	Current	
Mid-Canterbury	Canterbury	1928	1946	
Miramar	Wellington	1946	1996	
Moeraki	Otago	1881	1887	
Mongonui	Northland	1861	1870	
Mongonui and Bay of Islands	Northland	1871	1881	
Mornington	Otago	1946	1963	
Motueka	Tasman	1860	1946	
Motueka and Massacre Bay	Tasman	1853	1860	Motueka and Collingwood
Mount Albert	Auckland	1946	Current	
Mount Herbert	Canterbury	1866	1870	Akaroa
Mount Ida	Otago	1871	1908	
Mount Roskill	Auckland	1999	Current	
Mount Victoria	Wellington	1946	1954	
Napier	Hawke's Bay	1861	Current	
Nelson	Nelson and Tasman	1853	Current	
New Lynn	Auckland	1963	Current	
New Plymouth	Taranaki	1853	Current	
Newton	Auckland	1861	1893	
Newtown	Wellington	1902	1908	Wellington South
North Shore	Auckland	1946	Current	
Northcote	Auckland	1996	Current	
Northern Division	Auckland	1853	1870	
Northland	Northland	1996	Current	
Oamaru	Otago	1866	1978	Waitaki
Ōhāriu	Wellington	1978	Current	
Ohariu-Belmont	Wellington	1996	2008	Ōhāriu (then Ōhariu)
Ohinemuri	Waikato and Bay of Plenty	1896	1928	Thames and Waikato
Omata	Taranaki	1853	1870	
Onehunga	Auckland	1861	1996	Maungakiekie
Onslow	Wellington	1946	1996	Ohariu-Belmont
Oroua	Manawatū-Whanganui	1902	1938	
Otago	Otago	1978	2008	Waitaki
Otago Central	Otago	1911	1978	Otago
Otahuhu	Auckland	1938	1984	Panmure
Ōtaki	Wellington and Manawatū-Whanganui	1893	Current	
Otara	Auckland	1984	1996	Mangere
Owairaka	Auckland	1996	1999	Mount Roskill and Mount Albert
Pahiatua	Manawatū-Whanganui and Wellington	1896	1996	
Pakuranga	Auckland	1963	Current	
Palmerston North (formerly Palmerston)	Manawatū-Whanganui	1890	Current	
Panmure	Auckland	1984	1996	Maungakiekie
Panmure-Ōtāhuhu (formerly Manukau East)	Auckland	2020	Current	
Papakura	Auckland	1978	Current	
Papanui	Canterbury	1969	1984	Christchurch North
Papatoetoe	Auckland	1978	1996	Manukau East
Pareora	Canterbury	1893	1896	
Parnell	Auckland	1861	1954	
Patea	Taranaki	1893	1963	Waimarino
Pencarrow	Wellington	1978	1996	Hutt South
Peninsula	Otago	1881	1893	
Pensioner Settlements	Auckland	1853	1870	
Petone	Wellington	1946	1978	Pencarrow and Western Hutt
Piako	Waikato	1946	2008	
Picton	Marlborough	1861	1887	
Ponsonby	Auckland	1887	1963	Grey Lynn
Porirua	Wellington	1860	1996	
Port Hills	Canterbury	2008	2020	Banks Peninsula
Port Waikato	Auckland and Waikato	1996	Current	
Raglan	Auckland and Waikato	1860	1996	Port Waikato
Rakaia	Canterbury	1972	2008	
Rangiora	Canterbury	1963	1996	Waimakariri
Rangiriri	Auckland	1978	1984	Raglan and Franklin
Rangitata	Canterbury	1887	Current	
Rangitīkei	Manawatū-Whanganui	1861	Current	
Remuera	Auckland	1938	1996	Epsom
Remutaka (formerly Rimutaka)	Wellington	1996	Current	
Riccarton	Canterbury	1893	1978	
Riverton	Southland	1866	1881	
Rodney	Auckland	1871	2020	Whangaparāoa
Rongotai	Wellington	1996	Current	
Roskill	Auckland	1919	1996	Owairaka
Roslyn	Otago	1866	1890	
Rotorua	Bay of Plenty	1919	Current	
Ruahine	Manawatū-Whanganui	1972	1978	Rangitikei
St Albans	Canterbury	1881	1996	Christchurch Central
St Kilda	Otago	1946	1996	Dunedin South
Selwyn	Canterbury	1866	Current	
Southland	Southland and Otago	2020	Current	
South Canterbury	Canterbury	1969	1978	Ashburton and Waitaki
Southern Division	Auckland	1853	1860	Franklin and Raglan
Stanmore	Canterbury	1881	1887	
Stratford	Taranaki	1908	1978	
Suburbs of Auckland	Auckland	1853	1860	
Suburbs of Nelson	Nelson	1861		
Sydenham	Canterbury	1881	1996	Wigram
Taieri	Otago	1866	Current	
Takanini	Auckland	2020	Current	
Tāmaki	Auckland	1946	Current	
Taranaki	Taranaki and Manawatū-Whanganui	1881	1996	Taranaki-King Country
Taranaki-King Country	Taranaki and Waikato	1996	Current	
Tarawera	Bay of Plenty and ?	1978	1996	Rotorua
Tasman	Tasman and Marlborough	1972	1996	West Coast-Tasman
Taumarunui	Manawatū-Whanganui	1908	1919	
Taupō	Waikato	1963	Current	
Tauranga	Bay of Plenty	1881	Current	
Te Aro	Wellington	1881	1890	City of Wellington
Te Aroha	Waikato	1890	1893	
Te Atatū	Auckland	1978	Current	
Temuka	Canterbury	1911	1946	Ashburton and Waimate
Tukituki	Hawke's Bay	1996	Current	
Thames	Waikato	1871	1946	
Thorndon	Wellington	1881	1890	
Timaru	Canterbury	1861	1996	Aoraki
Titirangi	Auckland	1987	2002	New Lynn
Tongariro	Waikato and ?	1984	1996	Taupo
Totara	West Coast	1871	1881	Hokitika
Tuapeka	Otago	1871	1911	Otago Central
Upper Harbour	Auckland	2014	Current	
Waiapu	Gisborne, Hawke's Bay (and Bay of Plenty?)	1893	1908	Bay of Plenty and Gisborne
Waihemo	Otago	1887	1902	
Waikaia	Southland	1871	1890	
Waikaremoana	Hawke's Bay ? Bay of Plenty ? Waikato ?	1984	1996	Taupo
Waikato	Waikato	1871	Current	
Waikouaiti	Otago	1866	1908	
Waimakariri	Canterbury	1996	Current	
Waimarino	Manawatū-Whanganui and ?	1911	1972	Rangitikei and King Country
Waimate	Canterbury	1881	1957	Timaru
Waimea	Nelson	1853	1887	
Waimea-Picton	Marlborough and Nelson	1887	1893	
Waimea-Sounds	Marlborough and Nelson	1893	1896	
Waipa	Waikato	1876	1996	
Waipareira	Auckland	1996	1999	Te Atatū
Waipawa	Hawke's Bay	1881	1946	Hawkes Bay
Wairarapa	Wellington, Manawatū-Whanganui and Hawke's Bay	1859*	Current	
Wairarapa and Hawke's Bay	Wellington and Hawke's Bay	1853	1859	County of Hawke and Wairarapa
Wairarapa North	Wellington and ?	1881	1887	Masterton
Wairarapa South	Wellington	1881	1887	Wairarapa
Wairau	Marlborough	1853	1938	Marlborough
Waitakere	Auckland	1946	2014	Kelston
Waitaki	Otago and Canterbury	1871	Current	
Waitemata	Auckland	1871	1978	Helensville
Waitomo	Waikato and	1919	1972	King Country
Waitotara	Taranaki	1881	1996	
Wakanui	Canterbury	1881	1887	
Wakatipu	Otago	1871	1928	Central Otago
Wallace	Southland	1858	1996	Clutha-Southland electorate
Wanganui and Rangitikei	Taranaki and Manawatū-Whanganui	1853	1960	Rangitikei and Wanganui
Wellington	Wellington	1853	1905	
Wellington Central	Wellington	1905	Current	
Wellington Country	Wellington	1853	1881	
Wellington East	Wellington	1887	1946	Miramar
Wellington-Karori	Wellington	1993	1996	Wellington Central
Wellington North	Wellington	1905	1946	
Wellington South	Wellington	1881	1946	Island Bay
Wellington South and Suburbs	Wellington	1887	1890	
Wellington Suburbs	Wellington	1893	1946	Onslow
Wellington Suburbs and Country	Wellington	1911	1919	Wellington Suburbs and Otaki
Wellington West	Wellington	1938	1946	Karori
West Auckland	Auckland	1984	1993	Henderson
West Coast	West Coast	1972	1996	West Coast-Tasman
West Coast-Tasman	West Coast and Tasman	1996	Current	
Western Hutt	Wellington	1969	1996	Hutt South and Ohariu-Belmont
Westland	West Coast	1866	1972	West Coast and Tasman
Westland North	West Coast	1868	1870	Grey Valley, Buller and Waimea
Westland South	West Coast	1868	1870	
Whanganui (formerly Wanganui)	Manawatū-Whanganui and Taranaki	1860	Current	
Whangaparāoa	Auckland	2020	Current	
Whangārei (formerly Whangarei)	Northland	1972	Current	
Wigram	Canterbury	1969	Current	
Woodville	Manawatū-Whanganui	1887	1890	
Yaldhurst	Canterbury	1978	1996	Ilam

== Māori electorates ==
The first four Māori electorates were established for special elections in 1868, during the term of the fourth parliament. These four seats remained until the country's change to a mixed-member proportional system in 1996, when a large number of general electorate seats were changed as well.

Electorate name	Area	Established	Abolished	Replaced with
Northern Maori	Northland and Auckland	1868	1996	Te Tai Tokerau
Eastern Maori	Waikato, Bay of Plenty and Gisborne	1868	1996	Te Tai Rawhiti and Te Puku O Te Whenua
Western Maori	Taranaki, Manawatū-Whanganui	1868	1996	Te Tai Hauāuru and Te Puku O Te Whenua
Southern Maori	South Island and Stewart Island	1868	1996	Te Tai Tonga and Te Puku O Te Whenua
Hauraki	Auckland and Waikato	1999	2002	Tāmaki Makaurau and Tainui
Tainui	Auckland and Waikato	2002	2008	Hauraki-Waikato
Te Puku O Te Whenua	Lower North Island	1996	1999	Ikaroa-Rāwhiti
Te Tai Rawhiti	Bay of Plenty, Gisborne and Waikato	1996	1999	Waiariki and Ikaroa-Rāwhiti

== Mining electorates ==
The gold mining electorates were created to represent the significant mining populations of the West Coast and Otago in the 1860s.

Electorate name	Area	Established	Abolished
Gold Field Towns	Queenstown, Arrowtown, Cromwell, Clyde, Alexandra, Dunstan Creek, Roxburgh, Hamiltons, Lawrence and Havelock	1865	1870
Gold Fields	Various gold mining areas across standard electorates in the province of Otago during the Otago gold rush	1862	1870
Westland Boroughs	Greymouth and Hokitika boroughs	1867	1870
