= 7th New Zealand Parliament =

Term of the Parliament of New Zealand

7th Parliament of New Zealand
←	6th Parliament	8th Parliament	→

Overview
- Legislative body: New Zealand Parliament
- Term: 24 September 1879 – 24 September 1881
- Election: 1879 New Zealand general election
- Government: Hall ministry

House of Representatives
- Members: 88
- Speaker of the House: Maurice O'Rorke
- Premier: John Hall

Legislative Council
- Members: 48 (at start); 43 (at end)
- Speaker of the Council: William Fitzherbert

Sovereign
- Monarch: HM Victoria
- Governor: HE Rt. Hon. Sir Arthur Hamilton-Gordon from 29 November 1880 — HE Rt. Hon. Sir Hercules Robinson until 9 September 1880

The 7th New Zealand Parliament was a term of the Parliament of New Zealand.

Elections for this term were held in 69 European electorates between 28 August and 15 September 1879. Elections in the four Māori electorates were held on 1 and 8 September of that year. A total of 88 MPs were elected. Parliament was prorogued in November 1881. During the term of this Parliament, two Ministries were in power.

== Sessions ==
The 7th Parliament opened on 24 September 1879, following the 1879 general election. It sat for three sessions, and was prorogued on 8 November 1881.

Session	Opened	Adjourned
first	24 September 1879	19 December 1879
second	28 May 1880	1 September 1880
third	9 June 1881	24 September 1881

== Historical context ==
Political parties had not been established yet; this only happened after the 1890 election. Anyone attempting to form an administration thus had to win support directly from individual MPs. This made first forming, and then retaining a government difficult and challenging.

== Ministries ==
The Grey Ministry had been in power since 13 October 1877 during the term of the 6th Parliament. It lasted until 8 October 1879, when the Hall Ministry under Premier John Hall formed a new caucus. This ministry lasted until 21 April 1882, well into the term of the 8th Parliament.

== Initial composition of the 7th Parliament ==
88 seats were created across the electorates.

Member	Electorate	Affiliation	MP's term	Election date
William Montgomery	Akaroa	Greyite	Third	1 September
William Sefton Moorhouse	Ashley	Conservative	Sixth	11 September
William Speight	Auckland East	Greyite	First	10 September
William John Hurst	Auckland West	Greyite	First	6 September
James Wallis	Auckland West	Greyite	Second	6 September
William Rolleston	Avon	Conservative	Fourth	28 August
William Murray	Bruce	Conservative	Third	9 September
James Bickerton Fisher	Buller	Greyite	First	9 September
William Barron	Caversham	Greyite	First	9 September
Alfred Saunders	Cheviot	Conservative	Third	6 September
Samuel Paull Andrews	Christchurch	Greyite	First	10 September
George Grey^{a}	Christchurch	Greyite	Third	10 September
Edward Cephas John Stevens	Christchurch	Conservative	Third	10 September
John Davies Ormond	Clive	Conservative	Fifth	10 September
James William Thomson	Clutha	Greyite	Third	11 September
Edward George Wright	Coleridge	Conservative	First	15 September
William Gibbs	Collingwood	Conservative	Third	11 September
Thomas Dick	City of Dunedin	Conservative	Third	2 September
Richard Oliver	City of Dunedin	Conservative	Second	2 September
William Downie Stewart	City of Dunedin	Conservative	Second	2 September
Vincent Pyke	Dunstan	Greyite	Third	3 September
Allan McDonald	East Coast	Greyite	First	5 September
Joseph Tole	Eden	Greyite	Second	5 September
Harry Atkinson	Egmont	Conservative	Fifth	5 September
Benjamin Harris	Franklin	Greyite	First	11 September
Ebenezer Hamlin	Franklin	Conservative	Second	11 September
Edward Wakefield	Geraldine	Conservative	Second	9 September
John Studholme	Gladstone	Conservative	Fourth	15 September
Robert Trimble	Grey and Bell	Conservative	First	8 September
Richard Reeves	Grey Valley	Greyite	Second	5 September
Edward Masters	Grey Valley	Greyite	First	5 September
James Fisher	Heathcote	Greyite	Second	8 September
Richard Seddon	Hokitika	Greyite	First	5 September
Robert Reid	Hokitika	Greyite	First	5 September
Thomas Mason	Hutt	Conservative	First	9 September
James Walker Bain	Invercargill	Conservative	First	1 September
Charles Christopher Bowen	Kaiapoi	Conservative	Third	5 September
Harry Allwright	Lyttelton	Greyite	First	4 September
Walter Johnston	Manawatu	Conservative	Third	6 September
William Henry Colbeck	Marsden	Greyite	First	11 September
James Shanks	Mataura	Greyite	Second	29 August
John Lundon	Mongonui and Bay of Islands	Greyite	First	10 September
Richmond Hursthouse	Motueka	Conservative	Second	2 September
Cecil de Lautour	Mount Ida	Greyite	Second	30 August
Fred Sutton	Napier	Conservative	Second	8 September
William Russell	Napier	Conservative	Second	8 September
Albert Pitt	City of Nelson	Conservative	First	6 September
Acton Adams	City of Nelson	Conservative	Second	6 September
Andrew Richmond	Suburbs of Nelson	Conservative	Fifth	8 September
Thomas Kelly	New Plymouth	Conservative	Fourth	6 September
William Swanson	Newton	Greyite	Third	2 September
Maurice O'Rorke	Onehunga	Greyite	Fifth	9 September
Frederick Moss	Parnell	Greyite	Second	4 September
Courtney Kenny	Picton	Conservative	Fourth	30 August
James Macandrew	Port Chalmers	Greyite	Seventh	5 September
William Jarvis Willis	Rangitikei	Conservative	First	3 September
Patrick McCaughan	Riverton	Independent	First	6 September
Seymour Thorne George	Rodney	Greyite	Second	8 September
Henry Driver	Roslyn	Conservative	Fourth	5 September
John Hall	Selwyn	Conservative	Fourth	29 August
James Fulton	Taieri	Conservative	First	9 September
George Grey^{a}	Thames	Greyite	Third	2 September
John Sheehan	Thames	Greyite	Third	2 September
Richard Turnbull	Timaru	Conservative	Second	6 September
William Gisborne	Totara	Greyite	Third	29 August
James Clark Brown	Tuapeka	Greyite	Fourth	6 September
George Ireland	Waikaia	Independent	First	8 September
John Blair Whyte	Waikato	Conservative	First	8 September
George McLean	Waikouaiti	Conservative	Third	6 September
Joseph Shephard	Waimea	Conservative	Second	5 September
Frederick Alexander Whitaker	Waipa	Conservative	First	10 September
Henry Bunny	Wairarapa	Greyite	Fifth	4 September
George Beetham	Wairarapa	Conservative	Second	4 September
Arthur Seymour	Wairau	Conservative	Third	8 September
Samuel Shrimski	Waitaki	Greyite	Second	5 September
Thomas William Hislop	Waitaki	Conservative	Second	5 September
Reader Wood	Waitemata	Greyite	Fifth	9 September
Hugh Finn	Wakatipu	Greyite	First	12 September
Henry Hirst	Wallace	Conservative	First	4 September
John Bryce	Wanganui	Conservative	Fourth	5 September
John Ballance	Wanganui	Greyite	Third	5 September
William Hutchison	City of Wellington	Greyite	First	5 September
William Levin	City of Wellington	Conservative	First	5 September
Alfred Brandon	Wellington Country	Conservative	Sixth	11 September
Henare Tomoana	Eastern Maori	Conservative	Second	8 September
Hone Tawhai	Northern Maori	Greyite	First	8 September
Ihaia Tainui	Southern Maori	Greyite	Second	8 September
Wiremu Te Wheoro	Western Maori	Greyite	First	8 September

^{a} George Grey was unseated on petition in Christchurch, as he had already been elected in the Thames electorate

== Changes during term ==
There were a number of changes during the term of the 7th Parliament.

By-election	Electorate	Date	Incumbent	Reason	Winner
1880	Rangitikei	8 May	William Jarvis Willis	Resignation	William Fox
1880	Waitaki	16 June	Thomas William Hislop	Resignation	George Jones
1880	Waikaia	21 September	George Ireland	Death	Horace Bastings
1881	Suburbs of Nelson	11 January	Andrew Richmond	Death	Arthur Collins
1881	Southern Maori	1 March	Ihaia Tainui	Resignation	Hōri Kerei Taiaroa
1881	City of Nelson	7 June	Acton Adams	Resignation	Henry Levestam
1881	Grey Valley	16 June	Edward Masters	Resignation	Thomas S. Weston
