= 6th New Zealand Parliament =

Term of the Parliament of New Zealand from 1876 to 1879

6th Parliament of New Zealand
←	5th Parliament	7th Parliament	→

Overview
- Legislative body: New Zealand Parliament
- Term: 15 June 1876 – 11 August 1879
- Election: 1875–1876 New Zealand general election
- Government: Second Vogel ministry (until 1876); First Atkinson ministry (1876); Second Atkinson ministry (1876–1877); Grey ministry (from 1877)

House of Representatives
- Members: 88
- Speaker of the House: William Fitzherbert
- Premier: George Grey — from 13 October 1877; Harry Atkinson — 1 September 1876 – 13 October 1877; Julius Vogel — until 1 September 1876

Legislative Council
- Members: 43 (at start); 49 (at end)
- Speaker of the Council: William Fitzherbert — John Richardson until 6 December 1878†

Sovereign
- Monarch: HM Victoria
- Governor: HE Rt. Hon. Sir Hercules Robinson from 27 March 1879 — HE The Marquess of Normanby until 21 February 1879

The 6th New Zealand Parliament was a term of the Parliament of New Zealand.

Elections for this term were held in 69 European electorates between 20 December 1875 and 29 January 1876. Elections in the four Māori electorates were held on 4 and 15 January 1876. A total of 88 MPs were elected. Parliament was prorogued in August 1879. During the term of this Parliament, five Ministries were in power.

== Sessions ==
The 6th Parliament opened on 15 June 1876, following the 1875–1876 general election. It sat for four sessions, and was prorogued on 15 August 1879.

Session	Opened	Adjourned
first	15 June 1876	31 October 1876
second	19 July 1877	10 December 1877
third	26 July 1878	2 November 1878
fourth	11 July 1879	11 August 1879

== Historical context ==
Political parties had not been established yet; this only happened after the 1890 election. Anyone attempting to form an administration thus had to win support directly from individual MPs. This made first forming, and then retaining a government difficult and challenging.

== Ministries ==
Since July 1875, the Pollen Ministry was in power, led by Premier Daniel Pollen. On 15 February 1876, the second Vogel Ministry was established, which lasted until 1 September 1876. This was followed by the Atkinson Ministry, what is known as the beginning of the Continuous Ministry, which lasted from 1 to 13 September 1876. It was reconstituted as the second Atkinson Ministry, which ruled from 13 September 1876 to 13 October 1877. This was succeeded by the Grey Ministry, which was in power from 13 October 1877 to 8 October 1879. This period extended slightly after the period of the 1879 general elections for the 7th Parliament.

== Initial composition of the 6th Parliament ==
88 seats were created across the electorates.

Member	Electorate	MP's term	Election date
William Montgomery	Akaroa	Second	29 December 1875
John Evans Brown	Ashley	Second	11 January 1876
William Rees	Auckland East	First	30 December 1875
George Grey	Auckland West	Second	23 December 1875
Patrick Dignan	Auckland West	Third	23 December 1875
William Rolleston	Avon	Third	22 December 1875
William Murray	Bruce	Second	23 December 1875
Joseph Henry	Buller	First	5 January 1876
James Seaton	Caversham	First	21 December 1875
Leonard Harper	Cheviot	First	8 January 1876
William Sefton Moorhouse	Christchurch	Fifth	21 December 1875
Edward Richardson	Christchurch	Second	21 December 1875
Edward Cephas John Stevens	Christchurch	Second	21 December 1875
John Davies Ormond	Clive	Fourth	7 January 1876
James William Thomson	Clutha	Second	20 January 1876
Cathcart Wason	Coleridge	First	6 January 1876
William Gibbs	Collingwood	Second	29 December 1875
James Macandrew	City of Dunedin	Sixth	20 December 1875
William Larnach	City of Dunedin	First	20 December 1875
Robert Stout	City of Dunedin	Second	20 December 1875
Vincent Pyke	Dunstan	Second	27 December 1875
George Read	East Coast	First	6 January 1876
Joseph Tole	Eden	First	6 January 1876
Harry Atkinson	Egmont	Fourth	3 January 1876
Hugh Lusk	Franklin	First	18 January 1876
Ebenezer Hamlin	Franklin	First	18 January 1876
Edward Wakefield	Geraldine	First	27 December 1875
Frederick Teschemaker	Gladstone	First	20 January 1876
Frederic Carrington	Grey and Bell	Third	28 December 1875
Martin Kennedy	Grey Valley	First	12 January 1876
Charles Woolcock	Grey Valley	First	12 January 1876
James Fisher	Heathcote	First	4 January 1876
Edmund Barff	Hokitika	Second	14 January 1876
Charles Button	Hokitika	First	14 January 1876
William Fitzherbert	Hutt	Fifth	29 December 1875
George Lumsden	Invercargill	First	24 December 1875
Charles Bowen	Kaiapoi	Second	21 December 1875
Hugh Murray-Aynsley	Lyttelton	First	28 December 1875
Walter Johnston	Manawatu	Second	10 January 1876
Robert Douglas	Marsden	First	10 January 1876
William Wood	Mataura	Second	6 January 1876
John William Williams	Mongonui and Bay of Islands	Second	17 January 1876
Richmond Hursthouse	Motueka	First	6 January 1876
Cecil de Lautour	Mount Ida	First	17 January 1876
Donald McLean	Napier	Third	30 December 1875
William Russell	Napier	First	30 December 1875
John Sharp	City of Nelson	First	20 December 1875
Oswald Curtis	City of Nelson	Third	20 December 1875
Andrew Richmond	Suburbs of Nelson	Fourth	30 December 1875
Thomas Kelly	New Plymouth	Third	23 December 1875
William Swanson	Newton	Second	24 December 1875
Maurice O'Rorke	Onehunga	Fourth	29 December 1875
Reader Wood	Parnell	Fourth	31 December 1875
Courtney Kenny	Picton	Third	18 January 1876
William Reynolds	Port Chalmers	Fourth	10 January 1876
John Ballance	Rangitikei	Second	5 January 1876
Samuel Hodgkinson	Riverton	First	7 January 1876
John Sheehan	Rodney	Second	17 January 1876
Arthur John Burns	Roslyn	Third	28 December 1875
Cecil Fitzroy	Selwyn	First	30 December 1875
Donald Reid	Taieri	Third	29 December 1875
George Grey	Thames	Second	6 January 1876
William Rowe	Thames	First	6 January 1876
Edward Stafford	Timaru	Fifth	28 December 1875
George Henry Tribe	Totara	Second	10 January 1876
James Clark Brown	Tuapeka	Third	22 December 1875
Horace Bastings	Waikaia	First	14 January 1876
Frederick Whitaker	Waikato	Second	5 January 1876
George McLean	Waikouaiti	Second	22 December 1875
Edward Baigent	Waimea	Second	7 January 1876
Alfred Cox	Waipa	Third	11 January 1876
Henry Bunny	Wairarapa	Fourth	4 January 1876
John Andrew	Wairarapa	Second	4 January 1876
Arthur Seymour	Wairau	Second	29 January 1876
Samuel Shrimski	Waitaki	First	10 January 1876
Thomas William Hislop	Waitaki	First	10 January 1876
John Macfarlane	Waitemata	First	19 January 1876
Henry Manders	Wakatipu	First	7 January 1876
James Parker Joyce	Wallace	First	30 December 1875
John Bryce	Wanganui	Third	7 January 1876
Julius Vogel	Wanganui	Fourth	7 January 1876
George Hunter	City of Wellington	Second	23 December 1875
Edward Pearce	City of Wellington	Second	23 December 1875
Alfred Brandon	Wellington Country	Fifth	31 December 1875
Karaitiana Takamoana	Eastern Maori	Second	15 January 1876
Hori Tawhiti	Northern Maori	First	15 January 1876
Hōri Kerei Taiaroa	Southern Maori	Second	4 January 1876
Hoani Nahe	Western Maori	First	15 January 1876

== Changes during term ==
There were numerous changes during the term of the 6th Parliament.

By-election	Electorate	Date	Incumbent	Reason	Winner
1876	City of Auckland West	25 July	George Grey	Resignation	Benjamin Tonks
1876	Wanganui	27 September	Julius Vogel	Resignation	William Fox
1877	Napier	15 February	Donald McLean	Death	Fred Sutton
1877	City of Wellington	27 March	Edward Pearce	Resignation	William Travers
1877	Totara	30 April	George Henry Tribe	Death	William Gisborne
1877	City of Auckland West	2 May	Benjamin Tonks	Resignation	James Wallis
1877	Wairarapa	3 July	John Andrew	Resignation	George Beetham
1878	City of Wellington	18 February	William Travers	Resignation	George Elliott Barton
1878	Parnell	20 February	Reader Wood	Resignation	Frederick Moss
1878	Timaru	8 April	Edward Stafford	Resignation	Richard Turnbull
1878	Port Chalmers	12 April	William Reynolds	Resignation	James Green
1878	Franklin	20 May	Hugh Lusk	Resignation	Richard Hobbs
1878	Cheviot	21 May	Leonard Harper	Resignation	Alfred Saunders
1878	Grey Valley	22 May	Martin Kennedy	Resignation	Richard Reeves
1878	Hokitika	26 June	Charles Button	Resignation	Seymour Thorne George
1878	City of Dunedin	3 July	William Larnach	Resignation	Richard Oliver
1878	Taieri	11 July	Donald Reid	Resignation	William Cutten
1878	Invercargill	17 July	George Lumsden	Resignation	Henry Feldwick
1878	Waipa	24 July	Alfred Cox	Resignation	Edward Graham McMinn
1878	Roslyn	29 July	Arthur John Burns	Resignation	Henry Driver
1879	Gladstone	3 January	Frederick Teschemaker	Death	John Studholme
1879	Mataura	15 January	William Wood	Resignation	James Shanks
1879	City of Nelson	6 February	John Sharp	Resignation	Acton Adams
1879	City of Auckland West	4 March	Patrick Dignan	Resignation	David Goldie
1879	Coleridge	8 May	Cathcart Wason	Resignation	George Hart
1879	Hutt	2 July	William Fitzherbert	Resignation	Henry Jackson
1879	Eastern Maori	7 July	Karaitiana Takamoana	Death	Henare Tomoana
1879	Southern Maori	7 July	Hōri Kerei Taiaroa	Resignation	Ihaia Tainui
1879	City of Dunedin	15 July	Robert Stout	Resignation	William Downie Stewart
