= William Henry Harrison (New Zealand politician) =

New Zealand politician

William Henry Harrison (1831 – 30 May 1879) was a 19th-century journalist from Greymouth who represented two Westland electorates in the New Zealand House of Representatives.

== Early life and professional career ==
Harrison was born in Leeds, Yorkshire, England, in 1831. He emigrated to New Zealand in early 1860 and arrived in Auckland, where he went into business. When his business failed, he was attracted by the Otago gold rush in 1861, but ended up working as a staff member of Julius Vogel on the Otago Daily Times. He moved to Greymouth in 1865, where he was the editor of the Grey River Argus.

In 1871, he moved to Wellington and became editor of the Wellington Independent, but he returned after one year to the Grey River Argus.

== Political career ==
New Zealand Parliament
Years	Term	Electorate	Party
1868–1870	4th	Westland Boroughs	Independent
1871–1875	5th	Grey Valley	Independent

In the 1868 by-election in the Westland Boroughs electorate, he contested the election against William Shaw, the Mayor of Hokitika, following the resignation of William Sefton Moorhouse. Harrison and Shaw received 98 and 81 votes, respectively. Harrison represented the Westland Boroughs electorate until 1870, and then the Grey Valley electorate from 1871 to 1875, when he retired.

He represented the Greymouth riding from February 1868 to December 1870 on the Westland County. In the first election for the Grey County in December 1876, he was the returning officer for the Cobden riding.

He was later elected to the Grey County himself, and stood unsuccessfully for the Grey Valley electorate in an 1878 by-election.

== Death ==
On 1 May 1879, he left for Melbourne to see a specialist after noticing pain in his jaw. The prognosis was for incurable cancer, and Harrison died in Melbourne on 30 May 1879 at age 48. He was survived by his wife and their two children.

New Zealand Parliament
New constituency	Member of Parliament for Grey Valley; 1871–1875	Succeeded by Martin Kennedy; Charles Woolcock
