= 1880 Waikaia by-election =

New Zealand by-election

The 1880 Waikaia by-election was a by-election held on 21 September 1880 in the Waikaia electorate in the Southland Region during the 7th New Zealand Parliament.

The by-election was caused by the death of the incumbent George Ireland, on 15 August 1880.

The by-election was won by Horace Bastings. He was opposed by William Morris of Waikaia.

== Results ==
1880 Waikaia by-election
Party	Candidate	Votes	%	±%
Independent	Horace Bastings	330	63.83	
Independent	William Morris	187	36.17	
Majority		143	27.66	
Turnout		517		
