= 1881 Grey Valley by-election =

New Zealand by-election

The 1881 Grey Valley by-election was a by-election held on 16 June 1881 during the 7th New Zealand Parliament in the West Coast electorate of Grey Valley.

The by-election was caused by the resignation of the incumbent MP Edward Masters on 9 May 1881.

The by-election was won by Thomas S. Weston.

== Results ==
The following table gives the election result:

1881 Grey Valley by-election
Party	Candidate	Votes	%	±%
Independent	Thomas S. Weston	995	49.68	
Independent	Gerard George Fitzgerald	919	45.88	
Independent	James Mill Morris	89	4.44	
Majority		76	3.79	
Turnout		2,003		
Registered electors				
