= Thomas S. Weston =

New Zealand politician

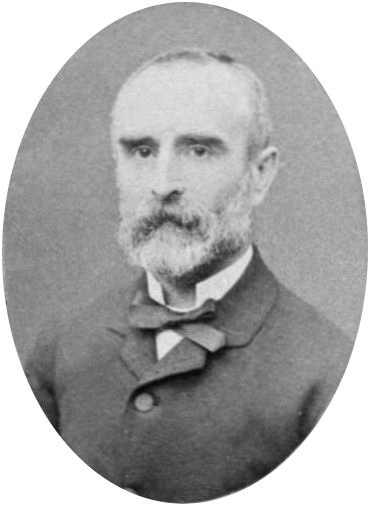
- Portrait of Weston from circa 1882

Member of the New Zealand Parliament for Grey Valley
- In office 16 June – 8 November 1881
- Preceded by: Edward Masters
- Succeeded by: Joseph Petrie

Member of the New Zealand Parliament for Inangahua
- In office 9 December 1881 – 17 March 1883
- Preceded by: New constituency
- Succeeded by: Edward Shaw

Personal details
- Born: Thomas Shailer Weston; 7 June 1836 London, England
- Died: 15 October 1912 (aged 76) New Plymouth, New Zealand
- Relations: Warwick Weston (brother); Agnes Weston (daughter-in-law); Tom Weston (great-grandnephew)
- Children: Thomas Shailer Weston, Jr. (son); Claude Weston (son)

Thomas Shailer Weston (7 June 1836 – 15 October 1912), often referred to as Thomas S. Weston, was a judge and 19th-century Member of Parliament from Westland, New Zealand. Weston was the patriarch of one of two dominant Canterbury families of the legal profession.

== Early life ==
Weston was born in London in 1836, the son of the printer John James Weston and Mary Weston. He was educated at private schools in London. He arrived in New Zealand with his parents and four brothers in 1850, first settling in New Plymouth. He received further secondary education in New Zealand, and in June 1861, he was admitted to the bar by George Arney, the Chief Justice.

== Professional career ==
He practised law in New Plymouth until 1863, when he moved to Invercargill. His first advertisement appeared in The Southland Times in August of that year. His clients there included the Union Bank of Australia, the town council, and various businesses. He was chosen as Southland's representative to the 1865 New Zealand Exhibition in Dunedin, but could not travel there due to unfavourable weather conditions.

Weston then moved to Auckland; his name first appeared in the Daily Southern Cross in June 1865. Like his brother Warwick, Weston had interests in gold mining. He set up the Great Republic Gold Mining Company in Karaka in the Thames District, was its majority shareholder and its manager. The family's residence was in central Auckland, on the corner of Jermyn Street (which disappeared when Anzac Avenue was built) and Eden Street (now Eden Crescent); they later lived in Parnell. He practised in Auckland until he was appointed district judge in November 1873 for the Hawke's Bay. The district court judge had previously been filled by Singleton Rochfort, but the position was disestablished, as Rochfort had caused trouble to the government. When Weston was appointed, Rochfort pointed that this move was illegal, as he had first right of refusal under previous agreements. After some deliberations, the government renamed the court from Hawkes Bay to East Coast to circumvent the agreement, and Rochfort took the premier, Julius Vogel, to the Supreme Court over the affair. Weston remained judge in Napier until February 1875.

Following an enquiry into the conduct of the justice for Otago, Henry Samuel Chapman, Parliament passed a resolution that allowed the Minister of Justice to order judges to move to a different court. Justice Gresson led the opposition of New Zealand's judges to this interference and even went to Wellington, but to no avail. In early 1875, three of New Zealand's five judges resigned over this affair: Gresson, Chapman, and the Chief Justice, George Arney. Gresson explained his objection in the following words:

What becomes of the independence of the Judges if they may be ordered by the Minister of the day, as often as he pleases, to remove to whatever part of the colony he pleases? It is obvious that such a power is open to gross abuse, and that if these be the terms on which they hold office, the Judges are not better off than when their commission was only during pleasure.

Weston was one of the two remaining judges, and he was transferred to the West Coast of the South Island. During his time on the coast, his most notable task was to chair the Westport Colliery Reserve Commission, which he conducted with Richmond Beetham. At the end of 1880, Weston retired from his judgeship and undertook the unusual step of rejoining the bar. He moved to Christchurch, where he established his legal practice, T. S. Weston and Co. His son Henry Warwick Weston was on his staff but died in September 1894, aged 24. Early in 1881, Weston and Allan Holmes of Dunedin were appointed as examiners of candidates for admission to the New Zealand bar; they were the first to be appointed to this position.

Weston took his son George into partnership in Christchurch on 6 July 1900 under the style of T. S. Weston and Son. When he took Robert Beecher Ward into the partnership, the name changed to Weston and Ward. Another person joined the partnership, William Ross Lascelles, and the company name was changed to Weston Ward & Lascelles. The company still exists today.

His legal practice in New Plymouth was taken over by two sons, Thomas Shailer Weston, Jr. and Claude Weston, in November 1902.

== Political career ==
New Zealand Parliament
Years	Term	Electorate	Party
1881	7th	Grey Valley	Independent
1881–1883	8th	Inangahua	Independent

Edward Masters represented the Grey Valley electorate from 1879 to 1881, when he sent his resignation from Melbourne in May 1881, stating that his medical advisers feared for his life if he travelled to New Zealand in his poor state of health. This caused a 16 June 1881 by-election in the electorate, which was contested by Weston, Gerard George Fitzgerald, and James Mill Morris. At the time, Weston was already living in Christchurch and he arrived in Greymouth shortly before the by-election. Weston beat Fitzgerald by a 3.8% vote margin, with Morris coming a distant third. Masters died later in the year in Melbourne on 27 November. Weston represented the Grey Valley electorate until the end of the parliamentary term on 8 November 1881, and he served alongside Richard Reeves in the two-member electorate.

In the 1881 electoral redistribution, the House of Representatives increased the number of European representatives to 91 (up from 84 since the 1875–76 election) further decided that electorates should not have more than one representative, which led to 35 new electorates being formed. The Grey Valley electorate was practically split, and the resulting electorates were Greymouth and Inangahua. Weston received requisitions from both electorates, and accepted the one from Inangahua, and in the end, this electorate was contested by both Reeves and Weston. They were joined by a third candidate, William McLean. Weston won the election with a margin of 17% of the vote over Reeves. Weston represented Inangahua until his resignation in 1883.

Throughout his representation in Parliament, Weston was living in Christchurch. He was one of the chief proponents for a railway to be built connecting the east and west coasts of the South Island.

== Community roles ==
While in Auckland, he was vestryman at St Paul's Church, an Anglican church in Symonds Street.

He was a governor of Canterbury College from 1894 to 1903, and was chairman of the board of governors in 1901 and 1902, when he relocated to New Plymouth. During his chairmanship, the board was again in conflict with Professor Alexander William Bickerton, and Weston claimed that his role gave him the right to act on his own initiative within board policy. This stance was heavily criticised, but Weston won the point and Bickerton was removed from the teaching staff.

== Family ==
Weston's father, John James Weston, was a printer, and he came to New Zealand intending to establish a newspaper. When the family emigrated, they had five sons: John, Warwick, Henry, William Joseph, and Thomas Shailer. In 1867, Henry Weston became the sole proprietor of the Taranaki Herald, and the Weston family had a strong connection with the Herald for the following 111 years.

Weston was the patriarch of one of two dominant Canterbury families of the legal profession; the other patriarch was Justice Gresson.

On 22 August 1867, Weston married Maria Cracroft Hill, the second daughter of the Auckland solicitor Henry Hill. She died on 29 October 1908 in New Plymouth, aged 72 years.

Their first son, Thomas Shailer Weston Jr., was born on 3 July 1868 in Auckland. He was a solicitor and became a member of the New Zealand Legislative Council from 1926 until his death by suicide on 21 January 1931.

Their second son, Henry Warwick Weston, was born on 18 July 1870. He died on 17 September 1894 after an operation, aged 24. He was a solicitor, admitted in August 1891, and worked for his father.

The third son, John James Weston, was born on 4 December 1872, and their first daughter, Louisa Mary Alice Weston, was born on 5 June 1874. Both died at Hokitika in September 1877 of scarlet fever; the girl on 17 or 18 September, and the boy on 20 September.

On 21 October 1876, the Westons had had their first twins: George Thorngate Weston and Walter Crowley Weston. Both lived to old age, with George dying in 1957, and Walter in 1961. George Thorngate Weston was admitted to the bar in 1898. Walter Weston was a solicitor.

Less than two months after losing two children, on 11 October 1877, the Westons had another set of twins. Both boys died after one months: Cecil Weston on 10 November, and Arnold Weston two days later.

Their youngest son, Claude Weston, was born on 28 December 1879. A crown solicitor, he was effectively the first president of the National Party. He died suddenly on 10 November 1946 while contesting the Wellington Central electorate, and his wife, Agnes Weston, became the candidate instead. She was later a member of the suicide squad of the New Zealand Legislative Council.

George Crowley Weston was a nephew to his children. He was a Rhodes' Scholar in 1939, was called to the bar at Lincoln's Inn, and gained his New Zealand registration in May 1938. He was a partner with Weston Ward & Lascelles. A son of George Thorngate Weston, Michael George Weston, was admitted in April 1952 and joined the Weston Ward & Lascelles partnership three years later. Tom Weston, a son of George Crowley Weston, is a current Queens Counsel.

A son of Claude Weston, Henry Stuart Thorngate Weston, practised in New Plymouth. He died in 1955 aged 49 years.

Thomas Shailer Weston Sr. died on 15 October 1912 at his Young Street residence in New Plymouth and he was interred at Te Henui Cemetery.

== Notes ==
New Zealand Parliament
Preceded by Edward Masters	Member of Parliament for Grey Valley; 1881; Served alongside: Richard Reeves	Constituency abolished
New constituency	Member of Parliament for Inangahua; 1881–1883	Succeeded by Edward Shaw
Academic offices
Preceded by Henry Richard Webb	Chairmen of the Board of Governors of Canterbury College; 1901–1902	Succeeded by Arthur Rhodes
