= 1868 Westland Boroughs by-election =

New Zealand by-election

The Westland Boroughs by-election 1868 was a by-election held in the Westland Boroughs electorate during the 4th New Zealand Parliament, on 3 April 1868.

The by-election was caused by the resignation of incumbent MP William Moorhouse and was won by William Henry Harrison. On nomination day (1 April) Harrison and William Shaw were nominated. The Westland Boroughs electorate was made up of the boroughs of Greymouth and Hokitika. Harrison was a resident of Greymouth and was the editor of the Grey River Argus. Shaw was the current Mayor of Hokitika, and proprietor of the West Coast Times. After a show of hands in favour of Shaw (eight votes to four), Harrison demanded a poll. William Harrison was subsequently elected two days later.

== Results ==
1868 Westland Boroughs by-election
Party	Candidate	Votes	%	±%
Independent	William Henry Harrison	98	54.7	
Independent	William Shaw	81	45.3	
Majority		17	9.5	
Turnout		179		

The polling was notable in that each candidate overwhelmingly dominated in their own borough, with Shaw taking 90% of the vote in Hokitika and Harrison all but one of the Greymouth votes.

	Hokitika	Greymouth
Shaw	80	1
Harrison	9	89
