= 1870 Riverton by-election =

New Zealand by-election

The 1870 Riverton by-election was a by-election held on 18 March 1870 during the 4th New Zealand Parliament in the Southland electorate of Riverton.

The by-election was caused by the resignation of the incumbent MP Donald Hankinson on 2 April 1870.

The by-election was won by Lauchlan McGillivray, he was unopposed.
