= 1878 Grey Valley by-election =

New Zealand by-election

The 1878 Grey Valley by-election was a by-election held on 22 May 1878 during the 6th New Zealand Parliament in the West Coast electorate of Grey Valley.

The by-election was caused by the resignation of the incumbent MP Martin Kennedy on 13 April 1878.

The by-election was won by Richard Reeves.

He was opposed by William Henry Harrison (who had been elected for the electorate in the 1871 election) and John Barrowman; Heber Newton withdrew but got 25 votes.

== Results ==
The following table gives the election result:

1878 Grey Valley by-election
Party	Candidate	Votes	%	±%
Independent	Richard Reeves	487	47.61	
Independent	William Henry Harrison	302	29.52	
Independent	John Barrowman	209	20.43	
Majority		185	18.08	
Informal votes		25		
Turnout		1023		
