= Lauchlan McGillivray =

New Zealand politician

New Zealand Parliament
Years	Term	Electorate	Party
1870	4th	Riverton	Independent
1871–1875	6th	Riverton	Independent

Lauchlan McGillivray (died 1880) was a 19th-century Member of Parliament from Southland, New Zealand.

He represented the Riverton electorate from 1870 to 1875 but was defeated in 1875. In 1871, he was elected unopposed and became the first mayor of Riverton.

New Zealand Parliament
Preceded by Donald Hankinson	Member of Parliament for Riverton; 1870–1875	Succeeded by Samuel Hodgkinson
