= Hori Tawhiti =

New Zealand politician

New Zealand Parliament
Years	Term	Electorate	Party
1876–1879	6th	Northern Maori	Independent

Hori Karaka Tawhiti was a 19th-century Māori member of the New Zealand Parliament.

He represented the Northern Maori electorate from 1876 to 1879, when he was defeated by Hōne Tāwhai.

He was a Member of the Executive Council in the second Atkinson Ministry, from 28 November 1876 to 13 October 1877.
