= Edward Masters (disambiguation) =

Edward Masters (1838–1881) was a New Zealand member of parliament.

Edward Masters may also refer to:

- Edward E. Masters (1924–2014), American diplomat
- Edward Master or Masters (1610–1691), English MP
- Edward Masters (cyclist), New Zealand cyclist who rode in the 2022 UCI Mountain Bike season
