= William Speight =

New Zealand politician

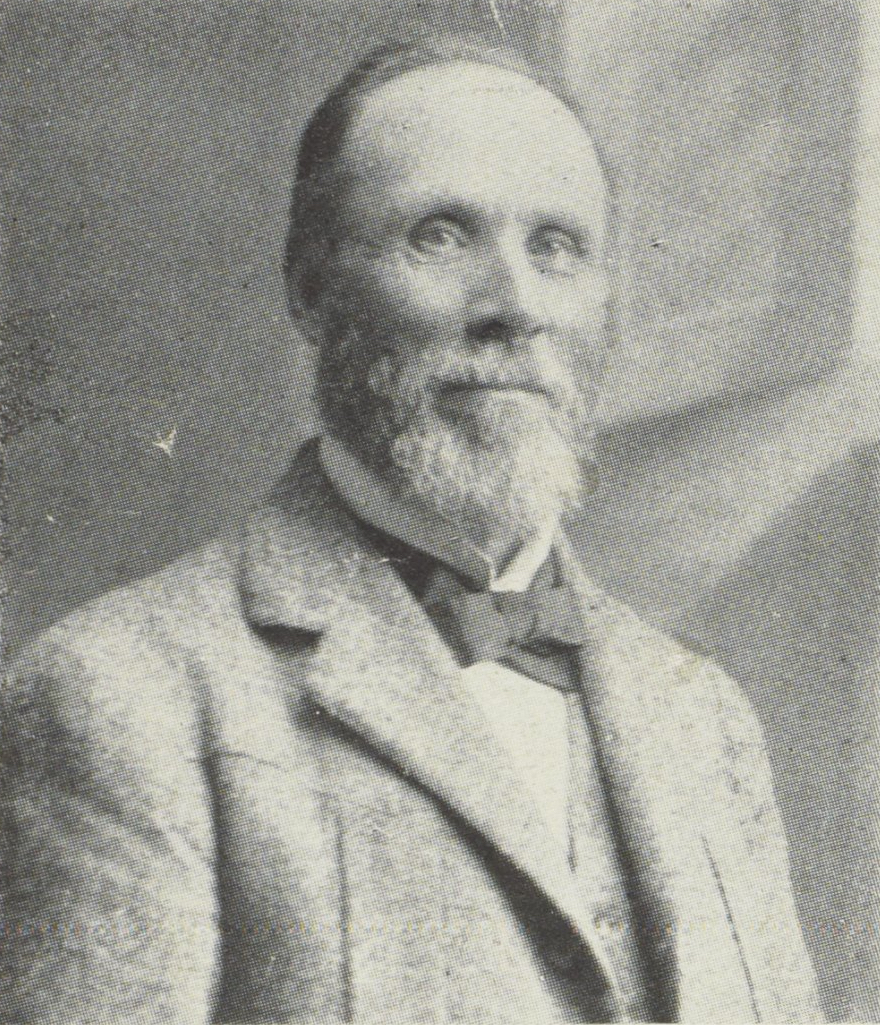
William Speight

William James Speight (1843 – 24 April 1919) was a 19th-century Member of Parliament in Auckland, New Zealand.

== Biography ==
New Zealand Parliament
Years	Term	Electorate	Party
1879–1881	7th	Auckland East	Independent

Speight was born in Dublin in 1843, where he attended the Blue Coat School. He trained as a mechanical engineer in his father's firm and emigrated to New Zealand in 1865 on the Maori. When gold was found in the Coromandel, he moved to Thames.

He married his cousin, a daughter of Isaac Speight, in 1872. They had six sons and three daughters.

He contested the Auckland East electorate in the 1879 general election against James Clark and with 371 to 363 votes obtained a narrow victory. He represented the electorate until the end of the parliamentary term in 1881, when he was defeated (for the Thames electorate).

Speight died in Auckland on 24 April 1919, and was buried at Purewa Cemetery.
