= Hōne Tāwhai =

Māori member of the New Zealand parliament

New Zealand Parliament
| Years | Term | Electorate | Party |
|---|---|---|---|
| 1879–1881 | 7th | Northern Maori | Independent |
| 1881–1884 | 8th | Northern Maori | Independent |

Hōne Mohi Tāwhai (c. 1827 – 31 July 1894) was a 19th-century Māori member of the New Zealand parliament.

Hōne Mohi Tāwhai was born in 1827 or 1828, probably in Waimā in the Hokianga. He was about 12 years old when his father, Mohi Tāwhai, signed the Treaty of Waitangi at Māngungu on 12 February 1840. His father died in a fall from his horse at Waima Mission Station after attending a Sunday service on 14 March 1875.

In the 1860s he was involved in a district runanga (tribal council) set up by Governor Grey. Later he was made a Native Land Court assessor. By the mid-1870s he became disillusioned with the Native Land Court and began to call for Maori control over land title and land alienation.

He represented the Northern Maori electorate from 1879 when he defeated Hōri Karaka Tawhiti, to 1884 when he retired. He debated effectively on a number of race relations issues. In 1879 there were doubts about his election, and the Elections Validation Act, 1879 validated the election of Tāwhai and two other MHRs, William Henry Colbeck and Wiremu Te Wheoro.

In 1881 and 1882 he promoted a Native Committees Bill to limit the power of the Native Land Court, and give Maori control of awarding land titles.

Tāwhai died on 31 July 1894.

New Zealand Parliament
| Preceded by Hori Tawhiti | Member of Parliament for Northern Maori; 1879–1884 | Succeeded by Ihaka Hakuene |
