= John Davies Ormond =

New Zealand politician (1831–1917)

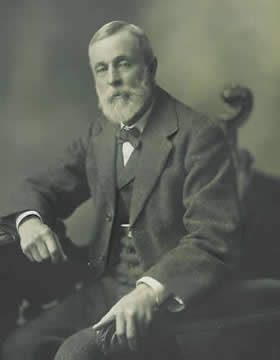
John Davies Ormond

John Davies Ormond (31 May 1831 – 6 October 1917) was a New Zealand politician whose positions included Superintendent of Hawke's Bay Province, Minister of Public Works and member of the New Zealand Legislative Council.

New Zealand Parliament
Years	Term	Electorate	Party
1861–1866	3rd	Clive	Independent
1866–1870	4th	Clive	Independent
1871–1875	5th	Clive	Independent
1876–1879	6th	Clive	Independent
1879–1881	7th	Clive	Independent
1884–1887	9th	Napier	Independent
1887–1890	10th	Napier	Independent

He represented the Clive electorate in Parliament from 1861 to 1881, when he was defeated (standing for the electorate of Waipawa). He then represented the Napier electorate from 1884 to 1890, when he retired.

He was appointed to the Legislative Council on 20 January 1891 and served until his death on 6 October 1917. He was appointed to the Council as one of seven new members (including Harry Atkinson himself) appointed to the Council by the outgoing fourth Atkinson Ministry; a move regarded by Liberals as a stacking of the upper house against the new government.

Ormond was baptised on 28 June 1831. He came from Wallingford, Oxfordshire, (then Berkshire), England, and established a homestead called Wallingford in Central Hawke's Bay in 1847, which became a major farming station.

Businessman and farmer Sir John Ormond, politician and farmer Tiaki Omana, and politician and Historic Places Trust chairman Ormond Wilson were his grandsons. His brother-in-law and husband of his sister was the Governor of Jamaica, Edward John Eyre. His second great-granddaughter is the Headmistress, Ormond Felicity Lusk. He married Hannah Richardson on 4 December 1860, the sister of Geordie Richardson. He died on 6 October 1917 at his home 'Tintagel' in Napier.

New Zealand Parliament
New constituency	Member of Parliament for Clive; 1861–1881	Constituency abolished
Preceded by John Buchanan	Member of Parliament for Napier; 1884–1890	Succeeded by George Swan
Political offices
Preceded by Donald McLean	Superintendent of Hawke's Bay Province; 1869–1876	Provincial Councils abolished
Preceded by Frederick Whitaker	Postmaster-General and Commissioner of Telegraphs; 1876–1877	Succeeded by George McLean
