= Charles Woolcock =

New Zealand politician (died 1891)

New Zealand Parliament
Years	Term	Electorate	Party
1876–1879	6th	Grey Valley	Independent

Charles Woolcock (died 1891) was a 19th-century Member of Parliament from Westland, New Zealand.

He represented the Grey Valley electorate from 1876 to 1879, when he retired.

New Zealand Parliament
Preceded by William Henry Harrison	Member of Parliament for Grey Valley; 1876–1879; Served alongside: Martin Kennedy, Richard Reeves	Succeeded by Edward Masters
