= Samuel Hodgkinson =

New Zealand politician

New Zealand Parliament
| Years | Term | Electorate | Party |
|---|---|---|---|
| 1876–1879 | 6th | Riverton | Independent |
| 1887–1890 | 10th | Wallace | Independent |

Samuel Hodgkinson (1817 – 10 January 1914) was a 19th-century Member of Parliament from Southland, New Zealand.

He represented the Riverton electorate from 1876 to 1879, when he was defeated; and then the Wallace electorate from 1887 to 1890, when he was again defeated.

New Zealand Parliament
| Preceded by Lauchlan McGillivray | Member of Parliament for Riverton; 1876–1879 | Succeeded by Patrick McCaughan |
| Preceded by Henry Hirst | Member of Parliament for Wallace; 1887–1890 | Succeeded by James Mackintosh |
