= Hugh Valentine =

New Zealand politician

New Zealand Parliament
Years	Term	Electorate	Party
1887–1890	10th	Waikaia	Independent
1890–1893	11th	Tuapeka	Independent

Hugh Sutherland Valentine (22 August 1848 – 10 September 1932) was a 19th-century independent conservative Member of Parliament in Otago, New Zealand.

Born in Aberdeen, Scotland, Hugh Valentine represented the Waikaia electorate from 1887 to 1890, and then the Tuapeka electorate from 1890 to 1893, when he retired. He later unsuccessfully contested the Wallace electorate for the Conservatives in the 1896 New Zealand general election coming third of five candidates behind two Liberals, the winner Michael Gilfedder and the Rev. Thomas Neave. Valentine did finish ahead of fellow Conservative Henry Hirst and Liberal James Mackintosh. After that, he retired from politics. Valentine eventually became General Manager of the New Zealand Agricultural Company and ran an auction house.

Valentine was a Captain in the Gore Rifles, and was also a lifefellow of The Royal Geographical Society, the London Chamber of Commerce, and the Royal Colonial Institute.

Valentine died in Dunedin on 10 September 1932, and he was buried in Gore Cemetery.
