= Grey Valley (electorate) =

Grey Valley is a former parliamentary electorate in the West Coast region of New Zealand. The electorate was created for the 1871 general election as a single-member electorate, became a two-member electorate for the 1876 general election, and was split between the single-member electorates of Greymouth and Inangahua for the 1881 general election.

== Population centres ==
The 1870 electoral redistribution was undertaken by a parliamentary select committee based on population data from the 1867 New Zealand census. Eight sub-committees were formed, with two members each making decisions for their own province; thus members set their own electorate boundaries. The number of electorates was increased from 61 to 72, and Grey Valley was one of the new electorates.

The Taramakau River formed the southern boundary of the electorate, from the mouth all the way to Harper's Pass (a historic alpine crossing). The boundary then followed the Main Divide to just short of Lewis Pass. From there, it stayed at some distance south from the Maruia River, then went for a long distance in a straight line towards the coast to then turn sharply south at the Paparoa Range before hitting the coast just south of Punakaiki. The main population centres in this configuration were Greymouth and the coal mining towns in the Brunner Borough (which itself was not constituted until 1887).

In the 1875 electoral redistribution, the electorate was extended towards the north into an area previously belonging to the Buller electorate by following the Maruia River for a distance to the west, with the boundary then nearing the coast on a line between Reefton and Inangahua, then followed the Paparoa Range towards the south before hitting the coast just south of Punakaiki. The main population centre gained by this boundary adjustment was Reefton.

== History ==
Grey Valley existed from 1871 to 1881. William Henry Harrison was the first representative from 1871 to 1875 when he retired. Harrison had previously represented Westland Boroughs from 1868 to 1870.

The electorate was represented by two members from the 1876 election onwards. Martin Kennedy and Charles Woolcock were elected in 1876; Kennedy resigned in 1878 and Woolcock retired at the 1879 election. Kennedy was succeeded by Richard Reeves in an 1878 by-election. He was defeated in 1881 when he stood for Inangahua. Edward Masters succeeded Woolcock in the 1879 election. Masters resigned in 1881 and was succeeded by Thomas S. Weston in an 1881 by-election. Weston stood in Inangahua in the 1881 general election and was successful.

== Members of Parliament ==
The Grey Valley electorate was represented by six members of parliament.

Key

Independent

=== 1871 to 1875 ===
From 1871 to 1875, Grey Valley was a single-member electorate. It was represented by one Member of Parliament.

Election	Winner
1871 election	William Henry Harrison

=== 1876 to 1881 ===
From 1876 to 1881, Grey Valley was a two-member electorate. It was represented by five Members of Parliament.

Election	Winners	
1876 election	Martin Kennedy	Charles Woolcock
1878 by-election	Richard Reeves	Charles Woolcock
1879 election	Richard Reeves	Edward Masters
1881 by-election	Richard Reeves	Thomas S. Weston

== Election results ==
=== 1881 by-election ===
1881 Grey Valley by-election
Party	Candidate	Votes	%	±%
Independent	Thomas S. Weston	995	49.68	
Independent	Gerard George Fitzgerald	919	45.88	
Independent	James Mill Morris	89	4.44	
Majority		76	3.79	
Turnout		2,003		
Registered electors				

=== 1878 by-election ===
1878 Grey Valley by-election
Party	Candidate	Votes	%	±%
Independent	Richard Reeves	487	47.61	
Independent	William Henry Harrison	302	29.52	
Independent	John Barrowman	209	20.43	
Majority		185	18.08	
Informal votes		25		
Turnout		1023		

=== 1876 election ===
1876 general election: Grey Valley
Party	Candidate	Votes	%	±%
Independent	Charles Woolcock	773	42.33	
Independent	Martin Kennedy	721	39.49	
Independent	Heber Newton	689	37.73	
Independent	Arthur Guinness	612	33.52	
Majority		32 (Note: Majority is the difference between the lowest winning vote (Kennedy – 721) and the highest losing vote (Newton – 689))	1.75	
Informal votes		26 (Note: The source is ambiguous; this could be 26 or 36 (26+10))	1.41	
Turnout		1,846 (Note: Note that voters could vote for up to two candidates)	88.62	
Registered electors		2,083		

Table footnotes:
