= 1875–1876 New Zealand general election =

1875–1876 general election
- 20 December 1875 – 29 January 1876

All 88 seats in the New Zealand House of Representatives
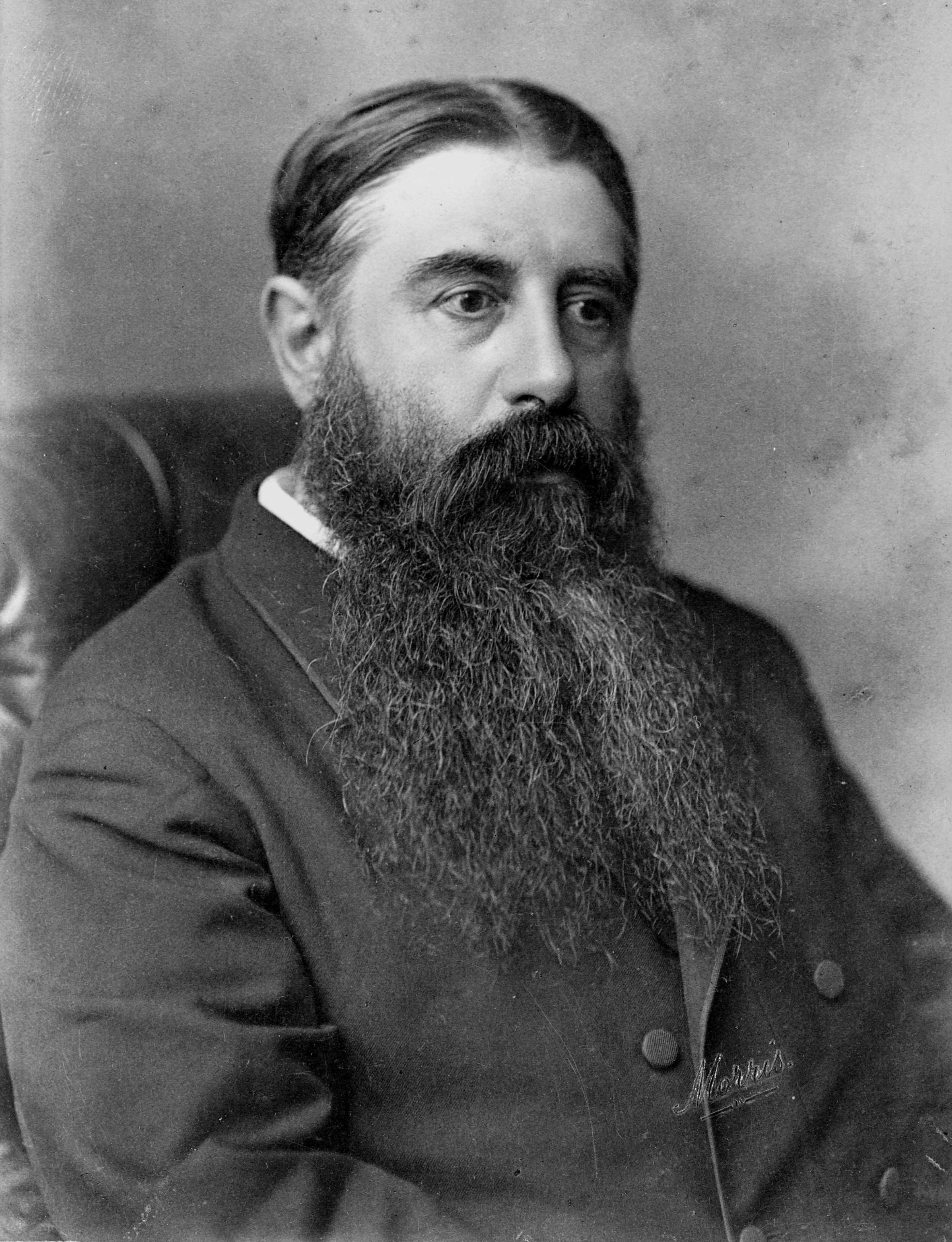
	First party
Leader	Julius Vogel
Party	Independent
Leader's seat	Wanganui
Last election	88 seats
Seats won	88
Seat change	Steady
Premier before election
Daniel Pollen
Independent
Subsequent Premier
Julius Vogel
Independent

The 1875–1876 New Zealand general election was held between 20 December 1875 and 29 January 1876 to elect a total of 88 MPs in 73 electorates to the 6th session of the New Zealand Parliament. The Māori vote was held on 4 and 15 January 1876. A total of 56,471 voters were registered.

== Background ==
Political parties had not been established yet; this only happened after the 1890 election. The previous parliament had 78 representatives from 72 electorates. In October 1875, Parliament passed the Representation Act 1875, and resolved to increase the size of Parliament to 88 representatives through the following changes:

- one additional member for City of Dunedin (from two to three)
- the single member electorates of Christchurch East and Christchurch West to amalgamate and form the City of Christchurch electorate with three members
- one additional member for Timaru (Geraldine was formed as a new electorate)
- one additional member for Waitaki (from one to two)
- one additional member for Grey Valley (from one to two)
- one additional member for Hokitika (from one to two)
- one additional member for Napier (from one to two)
- one additional member for Wanganui (from one to two)
- one additional member for Thames (from one to two)
- a new Waipa electorate (with one member)

With the two new electorates and the amalgamation in Christchurch, the number of electorates thus increased by one to 73. Eleven of the electorates were two-member electorates; two electorates were three-member electorates. To split Timaru into two electorates was proposed by the Timaru incumbent, Edward Stafford. The new electorate for the Waikato, Waipa, was added on the proposal put forward by William Jackson, who retired at the end of the parliamentary term in 1875.

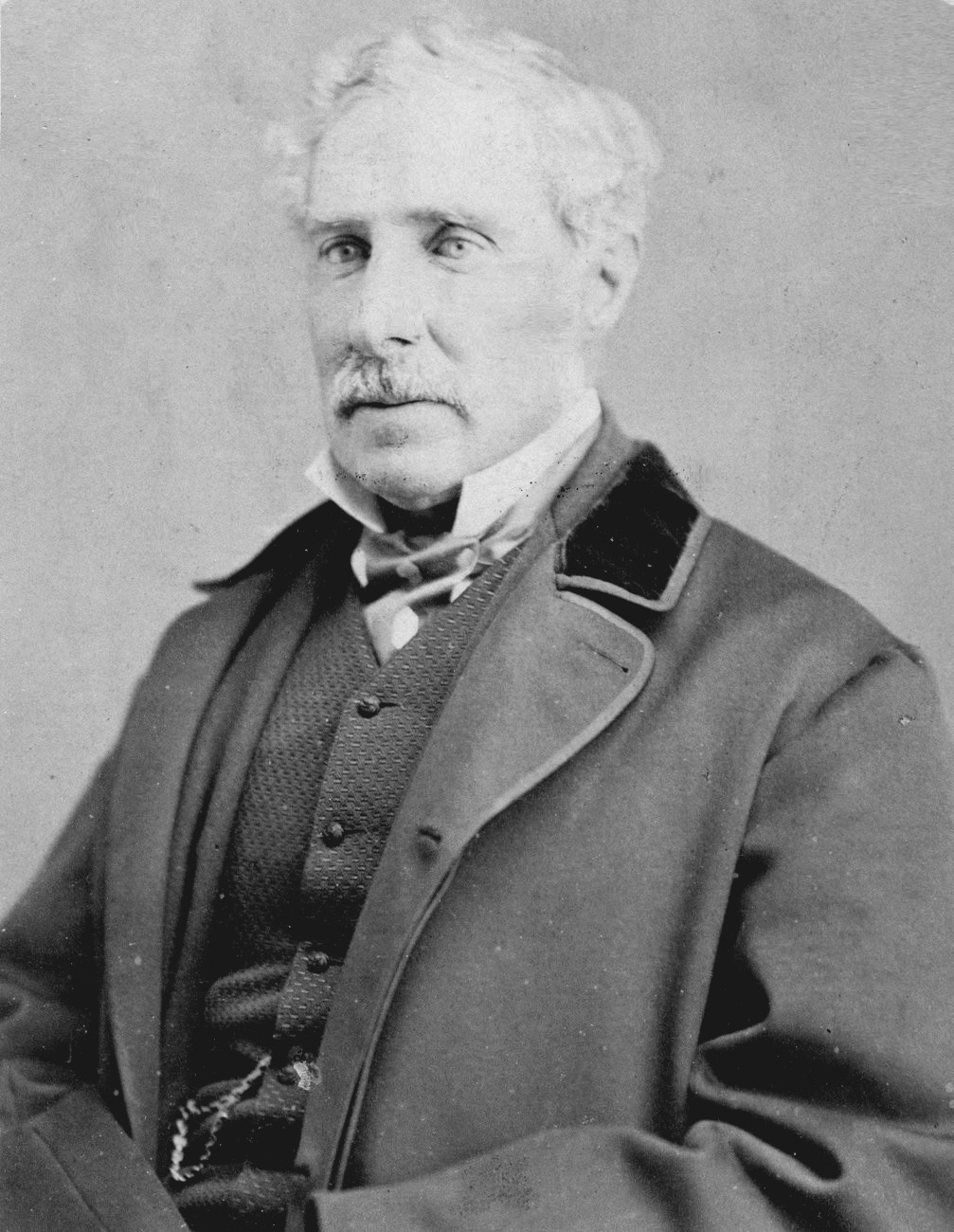
Sir George Grey, 1885

The election was held over six weeks in December 1875 and January 1876. The date of election is defined here as the day on which the poll took place, or if there was no contest, the day of nomination. The first elections were held on 20 December 1875 in the City of Dunedin and City of Nelson electorates, returning a total of five members. In Dunedin, the three positions were contested by eight candidates. In Nelson, 20 December was the nomination day and the two candidates were returned unopposed. In two electorates, elections were held on Christmas Eve, while 19 candidates were elected between Christmas and New Year.

The last election was held in the Wairau electorate on 29 January 1876 between Arthur Seymour and George Henderson. Seymour was successful. Elections in the Maori electorates were held on 4 January Southern Maori and 15 January (all other Maori electorates). A total of 56,471 voters were registered.

George Grey stood in the general election for both the Auckland West and the Thames electorates. In the two-member Auckland electorate, only Grey and Patrick Dignan were put forward as candidates, and were thus declared elected on 22 December 1875. The two-member Thames electorate was contested by six candidates, including Julius Vogel (who was Premier in 1875), William Rowe and Charles Featherstone Mitchell. On election day (6 January 1876), Grey attracted the highest number of votes and, unexpectedly, Rowe beat Vogel into second place (Vogel also stood in Wanganui, where he was returned). Hence Grey and Rowe were declared elected for Thames. A protest against Grey's election was lodged with the returning officer the following day, stating that Grey had not been eligible to stand in Thames as he had already been elected in Auckland West. This petition was filed to the House of Representatives at the end of January.

With this controversy going on for several months unresolved, Grey advised in mid June 1876 in a series of telegrams that he had chosen to represent Auckland West. On 8 July, the report of the committee inquiring into his election for Thames was read to the House. It was found that this was in accordance with the law, but that he had to make a decision for which electorate he would sit. On 15 July 1876, Grey announced that he would represent Thames, and he moved that a by-election be held in Auckland West for the seat that he would vacate there.

The Government received a majority over the opposition in the election, but with political parties not forming until 1890, precise numbers cannot be given. One newspaper counted 48 of the members as Government supporters. On 15 February 1876, the Pollen Ministry led by Daniel Pollen resigned. Julius Vogel, who had been Premier prior to Pollen, formed a new ministry and became Premier again.

== Result ==
Member	Electorate	MP's term	Election date
William Montgomery	Akaroa	Second	29 December 1875
John Evans Brown	Ashley	Second	11 January 1876
William Rees	Auckland East	First	30 December 1875
George Grey	Auckland West	Second	23 December 1875
Patrick Dignan	Auckland West	Third	23 December 1875
William Rolleston	Avon	Third	22 December 1875
William Murray	Bruce	Second	23 December 1875
Joseph Henry	Buller	First	5 January 1876
James Seaton	Caversham	First	21 December 1875
Leonard Harper	Cheviot	First	8 January 1876
William Sefton Moorhouse	Christchurch	Fifth	21 December 1875
Edward Richardson	Christchurch	Second	21 December 1875
Edward Cephas John Stevens	Christchurch	Second	21 December 1875
John Davies Ormond	Clive	Fourth	7 January 1876
James William Thomson	Clutha	Second	20 January 1876
Cathcart Wason	Coleridge	First	6 January 1876
William Gibbs	Collingwood	Second	29 December 1875
James Macandrew	City of Dunedin	Sixth	20 December 1875
William Larnach	City of Dunedin	First	20 December 1875
Robert Stout	City of Dunedin	Second	20 December 1875
Vincent Pyke	Dunstan	Second	27 December 1875
George Read	East Coast	First	6 January 1876
Joseph Tole	Eden	First	6 January 1876
Harry Atkinson	Egmont	Fourth	3 January 1876
Hugh Lusk	Franklin	First	18 January 1876
Ebenezer Hamlin	Franklin	First	18 January 1876
Edward Wakefield	Geraldine	First	27 December 1875
Frederick Teschemaker	Gladstone	First	20 January 1876
Frederic Carrington	Grey and Bell	Third	28 December 1875
Martin Kennedy	Grey Valley	First	12 January 1876
Charles Woolcock	Grey Valley	First	12 January 1876
James Fisher	Heathcote	First	4 January 1876
Edmund Barff	Hokitika	Second	14 January 1876
Charles Button	Hokitika	First	14 January 1876
William Fitzherbert	Hutt	Fifth	29 December 1875
George Lumsden	Invercargill	First	24 December 1875
Charles Bowen	Kaiapoi	Second	21 December 1875
Hugh Murray-Aynsley	Lyttelton	First	28 December 1875
Walter Johnston	Manawatu	Second	10 January 1876
Robert Douglas	Marsden	First	10 January 1876
William Wood	Mataura	Second	6 January 1876
John William Williams	Mongonui and Bay of Islands	Second	17 January 1876
Richmond Hursthouse	Motueka	First	6 January 1876
Cecil de Lautour	Mount Ida	First	17 January 1876
Donald McLean	Napier	Third	30 December 1875
William Russell	Napier	First	30 December 1875
John Sharp	City of Nelson	First	20 December 1875
Oswald Curtis	City of Nelson	Third	20 December 1875
Andrew Richmond	Suburbs of Nelson	Fourth	30 December 1875
Thomas Kelly	New Plymouth	Third	23 December 1875
William Swanson	Newton	Second	24 December 1875
Maurice O'Rorke	Onehunga	Fourth	29 December 1875
Reader Wood	Parnell	Fourth	31 December 1875
Courtney Kenny	Picton	Third	18 January 1876
William Reynolds	Port Chalmers	Fourth	10 January 1876
John Ballance	Rangitikei	Second	5 January 1876
Samuel Hodgkinson	Riverton	First	7 January 1876
John Sheehan	Rodney	Second	17 January 1876
Arthur John Burns	Roslyn	Third	28 December 1875
Cecil Fitzroy	Selwyn	First	30 December 1875
Donald Reid	Taieri	Third	29 December 1875
George Grey	Thames	Second	6 January 1876
William Rowe	Thames	First	6 January 1876
Edward Stafford	Timaru	Fifth	28 December 1875
George Henry Tribe	Totara	Second	10 January 1876
James Clark Brown	Tuapeka	Third	22 December 1875
Horace Bastings	Waikaia	First	14 January 1876
Frederick Whitaker	Waikato	Second	5 January 1876
George McLean	Waikouaiti	Second	22 December 1875
Edward Baigent	Waimea	Second	7 January 1876
Alfred Cox	Waipa	Third	11 January 1876
Henry Bunny	Wairarapa	Fourth	4 January 1876
John Andrew	Wairarapa	Second	4 January 1876
Arthur Seymour	Wairau	Second	29 January 1876
Samuel Shrimski	Waitaki	First	10 January 1876
Thomas William Hislop	Waitaki	First	10 January 1876
John Macfarlane	Waitemata	First	19 January 1876
Henry Manders	Wakatipu	First	7 January 1876
James Parker Joyce	Wallace	First	30 December 1875
John Bryce	Wanganui	Third	7 January 1876
Julius Vogel	Wanganui	Fourth	7 January 1876
George Hunter	City of Wellington	Second	23 December 1875
Edward Pearce	City of Wellington	Second	23 December 1875
Alfred Brandon	Wellington Country	Fifth	31 December 1875
Karaitiana Takamoana	Eastern Maori	Second	15 January 1876
Hori Tawhiti	Northern Maori	First	15 January 1876
Hōri Kerei Taiaroa	Southern Maori	Second	4 January 1876
Hoani Nahe	Western Maori	First	15 January 1876
