= William Jarvis Willis =

19th-century New Zealand politician

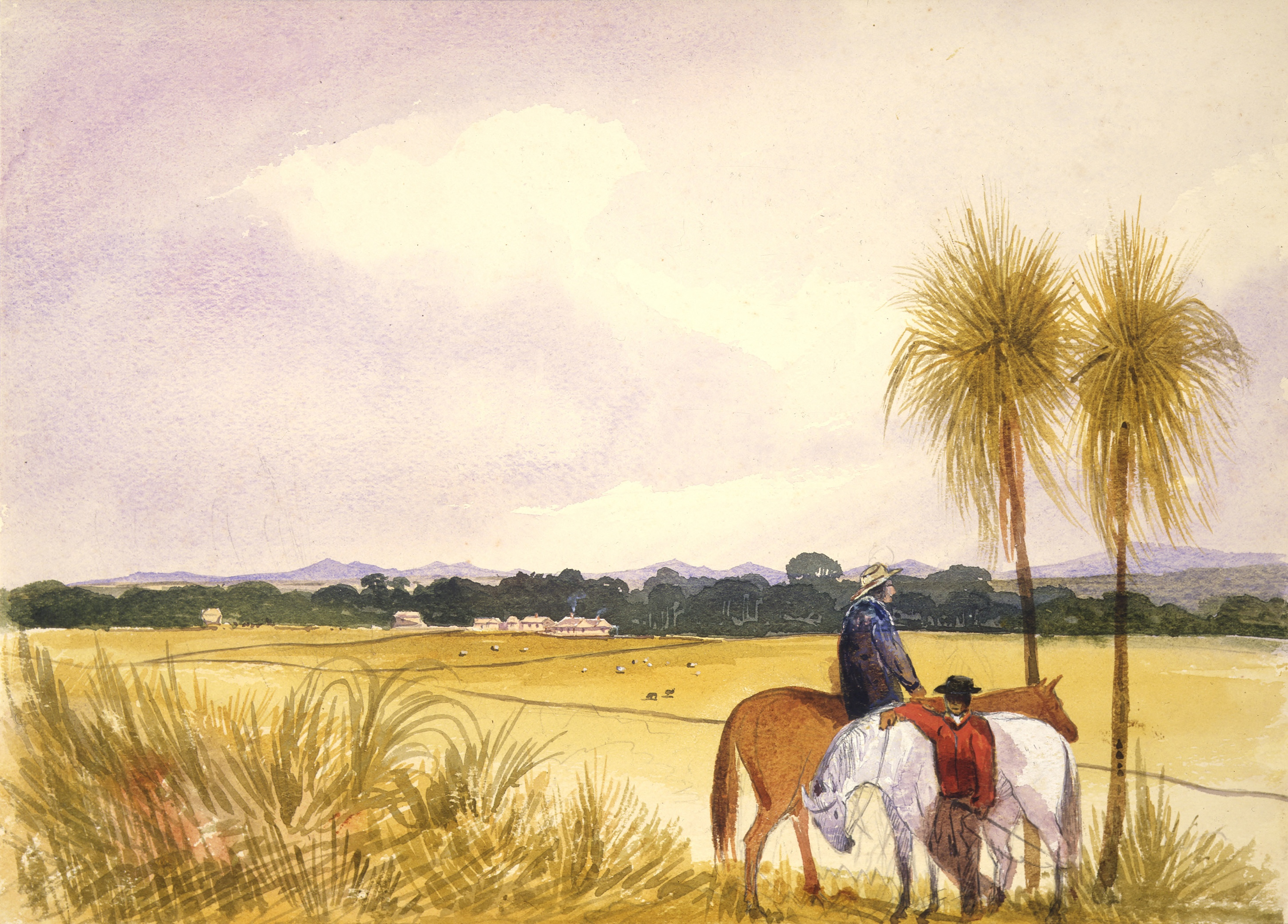
Koreromaiwaho, the farm of Willis in the Rangitikei

William Jarvis Willis (1839 – 1 March 1884) was a 19th-century Member of Parliament in the Rangitikei region of New Zealand.

== Biography ==
New Zealand Parliament
Years	Term	Electorate	Party
1879–1880	7th	Rangitikei	Independent

Willis was born in Sussex, England, the son of Rev. Thomas Willis and his wife Maria Augusta Lowe. He was educated at Eton College and then obtained a commission as ensign in the 14th Regiment. The regiment went to New Zealand in 1861 and he was Lieutenant and adjutant to the 2nd Battalion until the end of the war. He sold out in England and settled in New Zealand where he was appointed resident magistrate in Wairarapa. He took a farm at Marton adjoining the one of William Fox. Willis continued to act as Chairman of Petty Sessions for Rangitikei. During the confrontations with Maori, he was major in command of militia and volunteers in Rangitikei and Manawatu. He was appointed resident magistrate for the district in December 1863. In 1864 he purchased land near Marton which he called Woodendean. He soon introduced the first Romney sheep into the district.

In 1879 Willis resigned from the bench to contest Rangitikei seat as supporter of John Hall. He defeated Charles Lendrick MacLean but because of poor health he resigned early in 1880. He was chairman of the Upper Rangitikei Highways board, a member of the Rangitikei County Council and in later years chairman of Porena, Marton and Paraekaretu licensing benches.

Willis married Amelia Riddiford, daughter of early settlers Daniel and Harriet Riddiford. They had four daughters, but Amelia died in 1869 at the age of just 25. All four daughters married, and two of them had children. He wanted to marry her sister, but had to go to Australia to do so as it was then legal there but not in New Zealand. He had six children by his second marriage, of whom three sons and a daughter married and had children.

Willis died at his family home of Woodendean, at Greatford near Bulls in 1884, aged 44.

New Zealand Parliament
Preceded by John Ballance	Member of Parliament for Rangitikei; 1879–1880	Succeeded by William Fox
