= William Henry Colbeck =

New Zealand politician

William Henry Colbeck (1823 – 25 June 1901) was a 19th-century Member of Parliament in the Auckland Region of New Zealand.

== Life in England ==
Colbeck was born in Batley, Yorkshire in 1823 and was baptised on 20 February. His parents were William Colbeck (1783–1849) and Elizabeth Richardson (c. 1785 – 1856). He was involved in the woollen manufacture with his brothers Isaac and Simeon, trading as Cheapside Mill in Batley, and after selling that factory, trading as Colbeck Bros. in Alverthorpe.

== Life in New Zealand ==
New Zealand Parliament
Years	Term	Electorate	Party
1879–1881	7th	Marsden	Independent

Colbeck emigrated to New Zealand in 1877 to join two of his sons in the Kaipara District. He enlarged the land holding and built a residence. Colbeck was a strong supporter of the construction of the North Auckland Line that would service the Northland Region. He laid out the township of Batley on the Kaipara Harbour as a settlement project, but nothing came of it.

He represented the Marsden electorate from 1879 to 1881, when he retired. In 1879 there were doubts about his election, and the Elections Validation Act, 1879 validated the election of Cobeck and two other MHRs, Honi Mohi Tawhai and Wiremu te Wheoro.

He stood in the 1887 election in the Rodney electorate, but was beaten by the incumbent, William Pollock Moat.

In about 1884, Colbeck moved to Auckland. He was well known as a businessman and president of the Bank of New Zealand, president of the Chamber of Commerce, and president of the Auckland Club.

== Family and death ==
On 9 August 1849, Colbeck married Martha Cordingley, the daughter of John Cordingley, at Halifax. He is listed as a manufacturer at Batley in the marriage advertisement, and his wife as being from nearby Boothtown. His wife died on 4 June 1897 and was buried at St. Mark's Cemetery in Remuera. Captain Colbeck died at his home in Gladstone Road, Parnell, on 25 June 1901. He was survived by six sons and two daughters.

His son Frank Colbeck (1861–1941) was a life member of the Farmers' Union, and stood for the Country Party in three general elections. In 1925, he came a distant fourth in the Rotorua electorate. In the 1928 election, he came third in the Tauranga electorate. In 1931, he again contested the Tauranga electorate and was third (and last) again.

New Zealand Parliament
Preceded by Robert Douglas	Member of Parliament for Marsden; 1879–1881	Succeeded by Edwin Mitchelson
