= Horace Bastings =

New Zealand politician

New Zealand Parliament
Years	Term	Electorate	Party
1876–1879	6th	Waikaia	Independent
1880–1881	7th	Waikaia	Independent

Horace Bastings (1831–1909) was a 19th-century Member of Parliament from the Southland region of New Zealand.

From November 1872 to May 1874, and from May to June 1875, he served on the Executive Council of the Otago Province. He represented the Waikaia electorate from 1876 to 1879, when he retired; and from 1880 to the 1881 election, when he was defeated for Dunedin Central.
