= Patrick McCaughan =

New Zealand politician

New Zealand Parliament
Years	Term	Electorate	Party
1879–1881	7th	Riverton	Independent

Patrick Kinney McCaughan (8 September 1844 – 25 December 1903) was a 19th-century Member of Parliament from Southland, New Zealand.

He represented the Riverton electorate from 1879 to 1881, when he retired.

New Zealand Parliament
Preceded by Samuel Hodgkinson	Member of Parliament for Riverton; 1879–1881	Constituency abolished
