= Thomas Luther Shepherd =

New Zealand politician

New Zealand Parliament
Years	Term	Electorate	Party
1871–1875	5th	Dunstan	Independent

Thomas Luther Shepherd (1829 – 28 October 1884) was a 19th-century Member of Parliament from the Otago region in New Zealand.

He represented the Dunstan electorate from 1871 to 1875, when he retired.
