= Joseph Tole =

New Zealand politician (1846–1920)

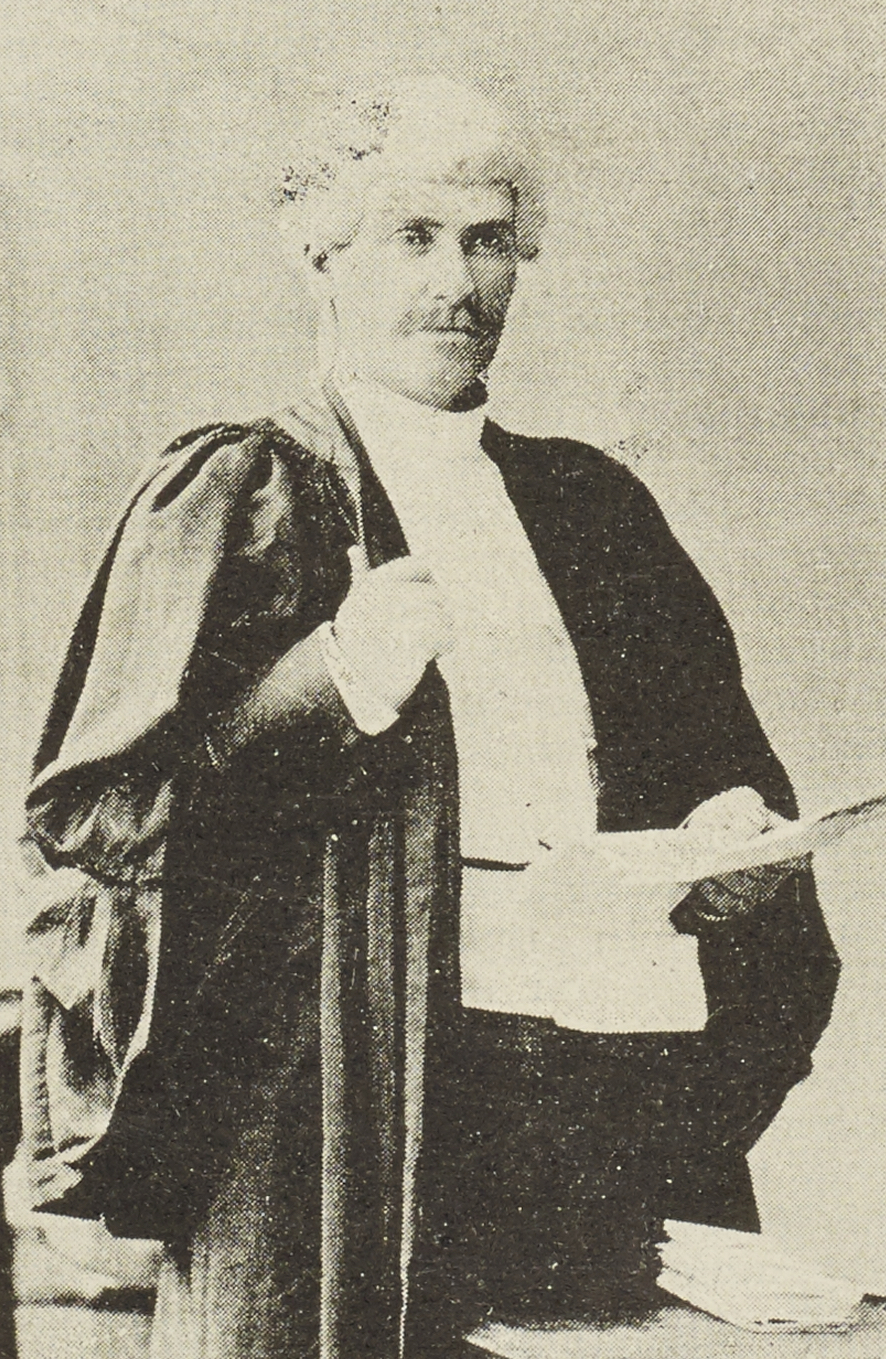
- Tole in court regalia

9th Minister of Justice
- In office 3 September 1884 – 8 October 1887
- Prime Minister: Robert Stout
- Preceded by: Edward Conolly
- Succeeded by: Thomas Fergus

Member of the New Zealand Parliament for Eden
- In office 6 January 1876 – 15 July 1887
- Preceded by: Robert James Creighton
- Succeeded by: Edwin Mitchelson

Personal details
- Born: Joseph Augustus Tole; 1846 Wakefield, Yorkshire, England
- Died: 13 December 1920 (aged 73–74) Remuera, Auckland, New Zealand
- Profession: Lawyer

Joseph Augustus Tole KC (1846 – 13 December 1920) was a 19th-century New Zealand lawyer, politician, and Minister of Justice from 1884 to 1887.

Tole was born in 1846 in Wakefield, Yorkshire, England. He came to Auckland with his parents, John Tole and Margaret O'Halloran. In Auckland, he attended St Peter's School under the guidance of his teacher, Richard O'Sullivan. From St Peter's School, he knew John Sheehan. He then boarded at St John's College in Sydney. He matriculated in 1865 and graduated with a Bachelor of Arts in 1868. He received admission to the bar in 1871 and subsequently graduated with a Master of Laws. Following that, he returned to New Zealand, where he was admitted in 1872.

He married Eleanor Blanche Mary Lewis in Auckland on 4 November 1882.

New Zealand Parliament
Years	Term	Electorate	Party
1876–1879	6th	Eden	Independent
1879–1881	7th	Eden	Independent
1881–1884	8th	Eden	Independent
1884–1887	9th	Eden	Independent

He represented the Auckland electorate of Eden from 1876 general election (held on 6 January) until 1887. Following the 1884 general election, he became Minister of Justice in the Stout–Vogel Ministry.

In the 1887 election, when he contested the Newton electorate, the two other candidates were Edward Withy (a political novice who, after early retirement from business, had emigrated with his large family to Auckland in 1884) and Henry Thomas Garrett. Tole and Garrett were liberal politicians, whilst Withy was a conservative. The liberal vote was split, and Tole, Withy and Garrett received 606, 701 and 170 votes, respectively, with Withy thus elected.

In 1893, he became Crown Prosecutor at Auckland and remained in that role until his death. He was among the inaugural New Zealand King's Counsel appointed in 1907. He had been ill for four months and was improving, but he died at his home in Remuera from heart failure on 13 December 1920.

== Notes ==
New Zealand Parliament
Preceded by Robert James Creighton	Member of Parliament for Eden; 1876–1887	Succeeded by Edwin Mitchelson
Political offices
Preceded by Edward Conolly	Minister of Justice; 1884–1887	Succeeded by Thomas Fergus
