= Martin Kennedy (New Zealand politician) =

New Zealand politician (1839–1916)

New Zealand Parliament
Years	Term	Electorate	Party
1876–1878	6th	Grey Valley	Independent

Martin Kennedy (c.1839 – 25 August 1916) was a 19th-century Member of Parliament from Westland, New Zealand. He was also a merchant, mine owner, businessman and Catholic layman.

He represented the Greymouth riding from December 1872 to November 1873 on the Westland County, when the county was abolished and replaced with Westland Province. He contested the election for Superintendent of Westland Province, but was beaten by James Bonar.

He represented the Grey Valley electorate from 1876 to 1878, when he resigned to concentrate on his business interests.

New Zealand Parliament
Preceded by William Henry Harrison	Member of Parliament for Grey Valley; 1876–1878; Served alongside: Charles Woolcock	Succeeded by Richard Reeves
