= Richard Reeves (New Zealand politician) =

Liberal Party politician (1836–1910)

The Honourable Richard Reeves
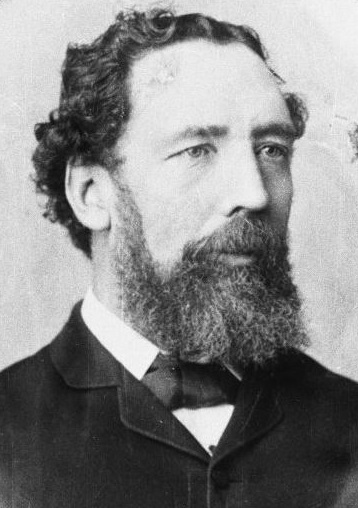
- Reeves c. 1880s

12th Speaker of the Legislative Council
- In office 23 March 1905 – 30 June 1905
- Preceded by: Alfred Cadman
- Succeeded by: Charles Bowen

Personal details
- Born: 1836 Enniscorthy, County Wexford, Ireland
- Died: 1 June 1910 (aged 73–74) Nelson, New Zealand
- Party: Liberal
- Relations: Charles Stephen Reeves (brother)

Richard Harman Jeffares Reeves (1836 – 1 June 1910) was a New Zealand politician of the Liberal Party. He was acting Speaker of the Legislative Council in 1905.

== Biography ==
=== Early life and career ===
Reeves was born in Enniscorthy, County Wexford, Ireland, in 1836. He was educated at Barrow Grammar School, and subsequently at Tarvin, Cheshire. In early youth he went to sea and in 1852 he left England for Sydney, New South Wales. He worked in various trades, including mining, store keeping, cattle dealing and auctioneering.

=== Political career ===
New Zealand Parliament
Years	Term	Electorate	Party
1878–1879	6th	Grey Valley	Independent
1879–1881	7th	Grey Valley	Independent
1887–1890	10th	Inangahua	Independent
1890–1893	11th	Inangahua	Liberal

Whilst absent on a visit to Australia in 1866, he was elected member for the Hokitika electorate in the Canterbury Provincial Council, but resigned on his return to New Zealand, as he found that pressure of business prevented him from taking his seat. His membership lasted from 4 July to 20 October 1866. When the West Coast was separated from Canterbury, Reeves was elected onto the Westland County for the Hokitika riding (May 1869 – June 1870). He represented the Grey electorate on the Nelson Provincial Council in the last few months before the abolition of the provincial governments (28 April 1876 – 31 October 1876).

He represented the Grey Valley electorate in Parliament from an 1878 by-election, caused by the resignation of Martin Kennedy, to 1881. He was defeated for the Inangahua electorate in the 1881 general election, but won that electorate in 1887. Reeves joined the Liberal Party when it was formed after the 1890 election and all through his political career he has been a consistent advocate of all liberal and labour measures. He resigned on 26 April 1893 as he had been adjudged bankrupt. At the November 1893 election, he contested the electorate once more, but came last of the three candidates.

Reeves was appointed to the Legislative Council on 13 December 1895, and was reappointed at the end of the term in 1902 and 1909. After the death of Alfred Cadman, he was acting Speaker in 1905 (23 March – 30 June). He was Chairman of Committees for three periods between 1904 and his death on 1 June 1910.

He died in Nelson aged 76 of a heart attack after an illness. His wife had died in November 1908. They are both buried at Wakapuaka Cemetery.

Reeves was an elder brother of Charles Stephen Reeves, who was Mayor of Dunedin in 1876.

== See also ==
- 1893 Inangahua by-election

== Notes ==
Political offices
Preceded by John Rigg	Chairman of Committees of the Legislative Council; 1904–1906; 1906–1907; 1908–1910	Succeeded by William Cowper Smith
Preceded by William Cowper Smith	Chairman of Committees of the Legislative Council; 1904–1906; 1906–1907; 1908–1910	Succeeded by William Cowper Smith
Preceded by William Cowper Smith	Chairman of Committees of the Legislative Council; 1904–1906; 1906–1907; 1908–1910	Succeeded by Walter Carncross
Preceded by Alfred Cadman	Speaker of the New Zealand Legislative Council; 1905	Succeeded by Charles Bowen
New Zealand Parliament
Preceded by Martin Kennedy	Member of Parliament for Grey Valley; 1878–1881; Served alongside: Charles Woolcock, Edward Masters, Thomas S. Weston	Constituency abolished
Preceded by Stuart Menteath	Member of Parliament for Inangahua; 1887–1893	Succeeded by Robert Stout
