= George Ireland (New Zealand politician) =

New Zealand politician

New Zealand Parliament
Years	Term	Electorate	Party
1879–1880	7th	Waikaia	Independent

George Ireland (1829 – 15 August 1880) was a 19th-century Member of Parliament from the Southland region of New Zealand.

He represented the Waikaia electorate from 1879 to 1880, when he died.

He died in Wellington. He had represented Benger on the Otago Provincial Council.
