= Grey River Argus =

Defunct New Zealand newspaper

The Grey River Argus was a New Zealand newspaper which was published between 1865 and 1966. The paper served the West Coast Region, focussing mainly on the area around the town of Greymouth. Its chief rival was the Greymouth Star.

== Founding and early years ==
The Argus was founded in later 1865 by James Kerr, who had previously worked on newspapers in Australia and for the Otago Daily Times. A friend of Premier Richard John Seddon, Kerr remained the owner of the paper until his death in 1901. Kerr's son James became manager of the paper after his father's death. The paper was originally published three times a week, changing to a daily in 1871. Notable early editors included William Henry Harrison (from 1868 to 1879) and Florence Romuald McCarthy (from 1880 to 1914).

== Labour connections ==
The newspaper was a rarity in New Zealand in that it openly declared its left-wing affiliation. The West Coast was a leader in the founding of the labour movement in New Zealand, from its early days as the country's biggest coal mining region to the founding of the New Zealand Labour Party in Blackball in 1916. The Argus had a long association with the New Zealand Federation of Labour, and openly supported the political campaign of local Labour Party candidate Harry Holland. Labour politician (and future Prime Minister) Peter Fraser wrote editorials during the campaign. In 1919, the paper was acquired by West Coast trade unions.

== Demise ==
The paper continued to be published until the mid-1960s. In early 1966 the paper was taken over by Buller Westland Publishing Company and relaunched as the Argus Leader. The changes failed to save a paper which had outlived its original purpose, and it closed in November 1966.
