= Grey County, New Zealand =

Coordinates: 42°28′S 171°12′E

Grey County
- County of New Zealand
- 1876–1989
- Capital: Greymouth Borough
- History
  - Established: 1876
  - Disestablished: 1989
- Today part of: Grey District

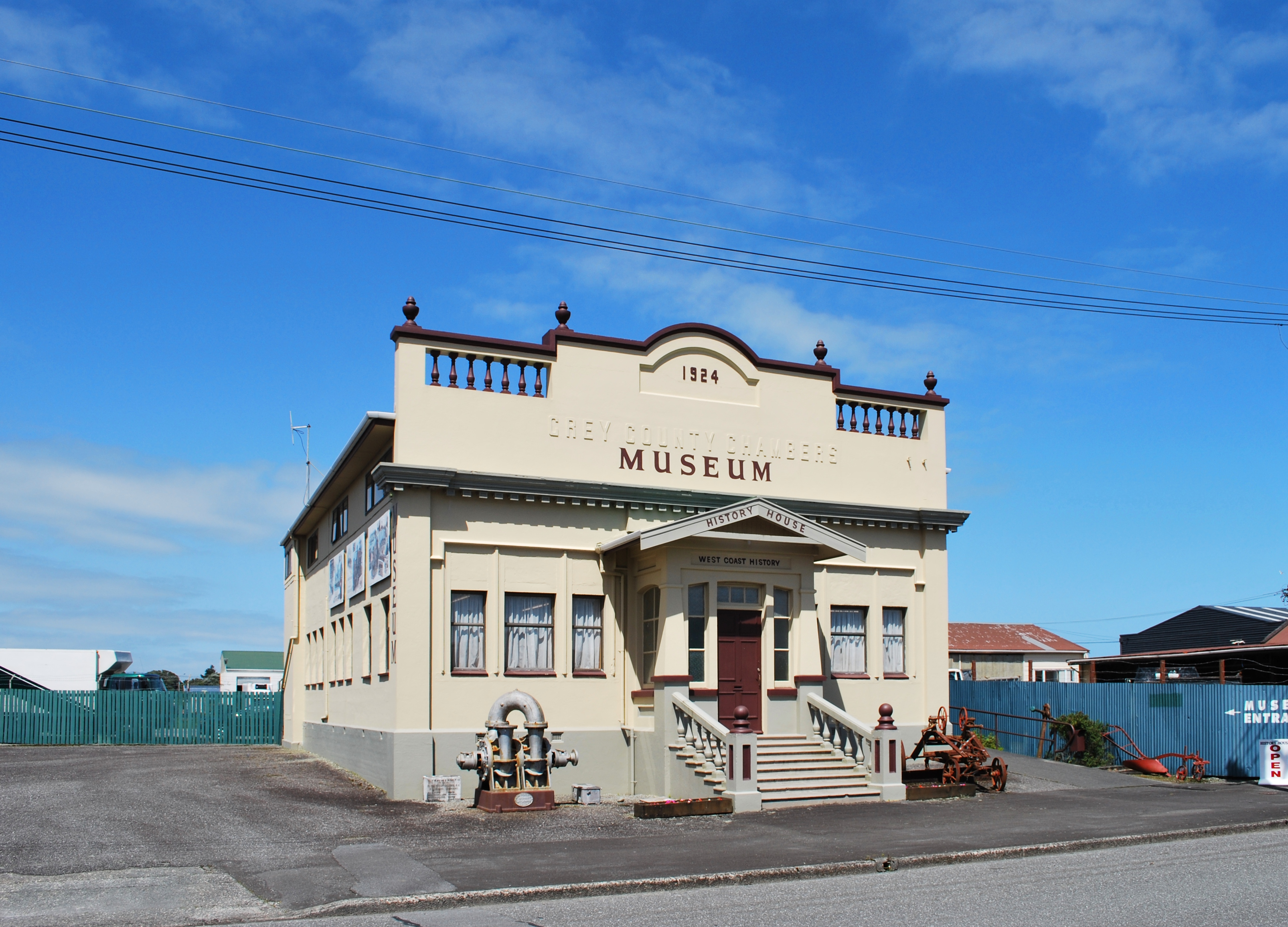
The Grey County Chambers, built in Greymouth in 1924, today a museum

Grey County was one of the counties of New Zealand in the South Island from 1876 to 1989.

From 1853 to 1873, the area that would become Grey County was partly in Nelson Province and partly in Canterbury Province. In 1873, the portions that had been administered by Canterbury Province were transferred to the newly created Westland Province. The overall area covered rural land and urban settlements, though the administrative authority for the urban area of Greymouth was transferred from Canterbury Province to the Greymouth Borough Council in 1868.

The reason that the area that would become Grey County went across a provincial boundary was that the boundary had been set as a straight line from the head of the Hurunui River to Lake Brunner at a time when the area was virtually uninhabited, but the West Coast gold rush then straddled that boundary. In 1866, there was a failed proposal for portions of Canterbury Province, including the urban area of Greymouth and the rural area south to the Taramakau River, to be annexed and solely administered by Nelson Province.

With the Abolition of Provinces Act 1876, Grey County was created, taking over administration of its area in January 1877. The southern boundary of Grey County was the Taramakau River, and the maintenance of the bridge over the river was shared with Westland County. Grey County extended for 64 kilometres (40 miles) along the coast, and went inland as far as the great divide in the Southern Alps. The head of the local government administration was an elected chairman, with the county council's administrative headquarters located in Greymouth Borough.

Grey County existed until the 1989 local government reforms, when the Grey District was formed through the amalgamation of the administrative areas of Greymouth Borough and Grey County.

== See also ==
- List of former counties in New Zealand
