= 1871 New Zealand general election =

New Zealand general election

1871 general election
- 14 January – 23 February 1871

All 78 seats in the New Zealand House of Representatives
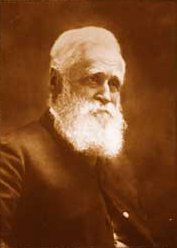
	First party
Leader	William Fox
Party	Independent
Leader's seat	Rangitikei
Last election	78 seats
Seats won	78
Seat change	Steady
Premier before election
William Fox
Independent
Subsequent Premier
William Fox
Independent

The 1871 New Zealand general election was held between 14 January and 23 February to elect 78 MPs across 72 electorates to the fifth session of the New Zealand Parliament. 41,527 electors were registered.

== Background ==
1871 was the first general election to include the four Māori electorates, with elections held on 1 and 15 February. The first Māori Members of Parliament had been elected in 1868, but in 1871 three retired and one (Western Maori) was defeated. So in 1871 four new Māori MPs were elected.

In 1866 the secret ballot was introduced for general (European) elections. The 1871 general election was the first one at which it was used. The secret ballot not used in Māori electorates until 1938, thus Māori voters continued to inform a polling officer orally of their chosen candidate.

The date of election is defined here as the day on which the poll took place, or if there was no contest, the day of nomination. The earliest election day was 14 January 1871. The earliest date in the general electorate results table, 13 January 1871, thus represents William Rolleston being declared elected unopposed in the Avon electorate on nomination day. The last election was held on 23 February 1871 in the Franklin electorate.

68 European electorates and 4 Māori electorates were defined by the Representation Act 1870. Six of the general electorates had two representatives, the rest were single member electorates. Hence, 78 MPs were elected. Electorates that were first formed for the 1871 elections were East Coast, Eden, Rodney, Thames, Waikato, Waitemata, Egmont, Manawatu, Buller, Grey Valley, Christchurch East, Christchurch West, Hokitika, Totara, Dunstan, Mount Ida, Tuapeka, Waitaki, Waikaia, and Wakatipu. 41,527 electors were registered.

== Results ==
Member	Electorate	Province	MP's term	Election date
Robert Rhodes	Akaroa	Canterbury	First	26 January
John Evans Brown	Ashley	Canterbury	First	17 February
Julius Vogel	Auckland East	Auckland	Third	30 January
Thomas Gillies	Auckland West	Auckland	Fourth	6 February
John Williamson	Auckland West	Auckland	Fourth	6 February
William Rolleston	Avon	Canterbury	Second	13 January
William Murray	Bruce	Otago	First	28 January
Eugene O'Conor	Buller	Canterbury	First	4 February
Richard Cantrell	Caversham	Otago	First	25 January
Henry Ingles	Cheviot	Canterbury	First	27 January
Jerningham Wakefield	Christchurch East	Canterbury	Second	18 January
Edward Richardson	Christchurch West	Canterbury	First	19 January
John Davies Ormond	Clive	Hawke's Bay	Third	26 January
James William Thomson	Clutha	Otago	First	31 January
John Karslake Karslake	Coleridge	Canterbury	First	4 February
Arthur Collins	Collingwood	Nelson	Second	16 February
William Reynolds	City of Dunedin	Otago	Third	20 January
John Bathgate	City of Dunedin	Otago	First	20 January
Thomas Luther Shepherd	Dunstan	Otago	First	7 February
William Kelly	East Coast	Auckland	First	16 February
Karaitiana Takamoana	Eastern Maori		First	1 February
Robert James Creighton	Eden	Auckland	Third	31 January
William Gisborne	Egmont	Taranaki	First	18 January
William Buckland	Franklin	Auckland	Second	23 February
Archibald Clark	Franklin	Auckland	Third	23 February
George Parker	Gladstone	Canterbury	First	7 February
Frederic Carrington	Grey and Bell	Taranaki	Second	17 January
William Henry Harrison	Grey Valley	Canterbury	Second	26 January
John Hall	Heathcote	Canterbury	Third	14 January
John White	Hokitika	Canterbury	First	25 January
William Fitzherbert	Hutt	Wellington	Fourth	16 January
William Henderson Calder	Invercargill	Southland	First	24 January
John Studholme	Kaiapoi	Canterbury	Second	27 January
Peacock, John Thomas	Town of Lyttelton	Canterbury	Second	16 January
Walter Johnston	Manawatu	Wellington	First	4 February
John Munro	Marsden	Auckland	Third	30 January
Dillon Bell	Mataura	Southland	Fourth	11 February
John McLeod	Mongonui and Bay of Islands	Auckland	First	10 February
David Monro^{a}	Motueka	Nelson	Fifth	10 February
David Mervyn	Mount Ida	Otago	Second	16 February
Donald McLean	Napier	Hawke's Bay	Second	19 January
Martin Lightband	City of Nelson	Nelson	First	6 February
Oswald Curtis	City of Nelson	Nelson	Second	6 February
Ralph Richardson	Suburbs of Nelson	Nelson	First	7 February
Thomas Kelly	New Plymouth	Taranaki	Second	28 January
William Swanson	Newton	Auckland	First	25 January
Wi Katene	Northern Maori		First	15 February
Maurice O'Rorke	Onehunga	Auckland	Third	20 February
Reader Wood	Parnell	Auckland	Third	23 January
Kenny, Courtney	Picton	Marlborough	Second	27 January
James Macandrew	Port Chalmers	Otago	Fifth	15 February
William Fox	Rangitikei	Wellington	Fourth	3 February
Lauchlan McGillivray	Riverton	Southland	Second	27 January
Harry Farnall	Rodney	Auckland	Second	13 February
Henry Driver	Roslyn	Otago	Second	30 January
William Reeves	Selwyn	Canterbury	Second	1 February
Hori Kerei Taiaroa	Southern Maori		First	13 February
Donald Reid	Taieri	Otago	Second	3 February
Charles O'Neill	Thames	Auckland	Second	9 February
Edward Stafford	Timaru	Canterbury	Fourth	20 January
George Henry Tribe	Totara	Westland	First	8 February
James Clark Brown	Tuapeka	Otago	Second	13 February
James Benn Bradshaw	Waikaia	Otago	Second	9 February
James McPherson	Waikato	Auckland	First	10 February
George McLean	Waikouaiti	Otago	First	23 January
Joseph Shephard	Waimea	Marlborough	First	13 February
Henry Bunny	Wairarapa	Wellington	Third	28 January
John Andrew	Wairarapa	Wellington	First	28 January
William Henry Eyes	Wairau	Marlborough	Third	24 January
William Steward	Waitaki	Otago	First	3 February
Thomas Henderson	Waitemata	Auckland	Fourth	8 February
Charles Edward Haughton	Wakatipu	Otago	Third	25 January
George Webster	Wallace	Otago	Second	20 February
John Bryce	Wanganui	Wellington	Second	30 January
George Hunter	City of Wellington	Wellington	First	7 February
Edward Pearce	City of Wellington	Wellington	First	7 February
Alfred Brandon	Wellington Country	Wellington	Fourth	17 January
Wiremu Parata	Western Maori		First	13 February

^{a} Unseated on petition.
