= Westland Boroughs =

Westland Boroughs was a parliamentary electorate in the West Coast of New Zealand from 1866 to 1870. A consequence of the West Coast gold rush was that the population increased dramatically and through the Westland Representation Act 1867, two electorates were turned into four. The Westland electorate was abolished through that act and its incumbent, William Sefton Moorhouse, was through that act transferred to the Westland Boroughs electorate. Hence, there was no election in this electorate when it was first established.

== Population centres ==
Westland Boroughs was made up of the areas covered by the boroughs of Greymouth and Hokitika. The enabling legislation allowed for further boroughs to be added as needed, but this did not happen.

== History ==
The Westland Representation Act 1867 introduced changes to the Waimea and Westland electorates. Their areas were reassigned and four electorates formed. Waimea lost some area, but continued to exist as a landlocked electorate. Westland was abolished in 1867. A new electorate (Westland Boroughs) was established, and the Act stipulated that the sitting member (William Sefton Moorhouse) was transferred to it. Other new electorates, for which by-elections were to be held, were Westland North and Westland South.

Hence, Moorhouse was the first representative, and he had been elected for the Westland electorate in the 1866 general election. Moorhouse resigned on 20 February 1868, and William Henry Harrison won the resulting by-election. Harrison served until the end of the term in 1870, when the electorate was abolished.

=== Members of Parliament ===
Westland Boroughs was represented by two Members of Parliament:

Election	Winner
1866 election	William Sefton Moorhouse (Westland incumbent)
1868 by-election	William Henry Harrison

== Election results ==
=== 1868 by-election ===
1868 Westland Boroughs by-election
Party	Candidate	Votes	%	±%
Independent	William Henry Harrison	98	54.7	
Independent	William Shaw	81	45.3	
Majority		17	9.5	
Turnout		179		
