= Donald Hankinson =

New Zealand politician

Donald Hankinson

New Zealand Parliament
Years	Term	Electorate	Party
1866–1870	4th	Riverton	Independent

Donald Hankinson (30 May 1832 – 6 November 1877) was a 19th-century Member of Parliament from Southland, New Zealand.

He represented the Riverton electorate from 1866 to 1870, when he resigned.

He was the son of Rev. Thomas Edwards Hankinson and his wife Caroline (née Cust).

New Zealand Parliament
New constituency	Member of Parliament for Riverton; 1866–1870	Succeeded by Lauchlan McGillivray
