= Christchurch West =

Christchurch West was a parliamentary electorate in the city of Christchurch, New Zealand, from 1871 for the 5th Parliament, and it existed until 1875.

== Population centres ==
The 1870 electoral redistribution was undertaken by a parliamentary select committee based on population data from the 1867 New Zealand census. Eight sub-committees were formed, with two members each making decisions for their own province; thus members set their own electorate boundaries. The number of electorates was increased from 61 to 72, and Christchurch West and Christchurch East were two of the new electorates. These electorates were concentrated on the central city and inner suburbs, and Colombo Street formed much of the boundary between them. Both of these electorates were abolished after one parliamentary term in the 1875 electoral redistribution, and replaced by the three-member City of Christchurch electorate.

== History ==
The electorate was created for the 1871 general election, and it was contested by Edward Richardson and Henry Wynn-Williams. The nomination meeting was held on 12 January, and the show of hands was 50 to 30 in favour of Wynn-Williams. Richardson demanded a poll, which was scheduled for 19 January. On polling day, Richardson and Wynn-Williams obtaining 234 and 214 votes, respectively. Richardson was thus declared elected.

The electorate was abolished at the end of the 5th Parliament in 1875. It was held by Richardson until the dissolution of Parliament in December.

== Member of Parliament ==
The electorate was represented by one Member of Parliament:

1871 general election: Christchurch West
Party	Candidate	Votes	%	±%
Independent	Edward Richardson	234	52.23	
Independent	Henry Wynn-Williams	214	47.77	
Majority		20	4.46	
Turnout		448		
Registered electors				
