= Greymouth Borough =

Borough council in New Zealand

Coordinates: 42°28′S 171°12′E

The Greymouth Borough was the borough council covering the urban part of Greymouth, New Zealand between 1868 (157 years ago) and 1989 (36 years ago), when it became part of Grey District.

== History ==
The Municipal Corporations Act, 1867 was passed by the New Zealand Parliament, and this allowed for petitions to the governor for towns to be constituted a borough. This would then allow such borough to govern itself. Such a petition was forwarded on behalf of the citizens by John Hall in May 1868. By notice in the New Zealand Gazette on 16 July 1868, Greymouth was constituted a borough; the same day as Timaru. The boundaries of the borough were defined as follows:

All that piece or parcel of land situate and being in the County of Westland, bounded on the west by a line of 160 chains and 80 links [3.23 km], extending from the South Spit along the beach thence along the South Town Belt 115 chains and 50 links [2.32 km]; thence along the East Town Belt 120 chains and 90 links [2.43 km] thence along the Native Reserve, number 31, 41 chains 30 links [0.83 km] to the Grey River and thence along the River Grey to the point of commencement.

— Governor of New Zealand, Notice in the New Zealand Gazette, 16 July 1868

The area covered by the borough was later extended to the north across the Grey River, and the suburbs of Cobden (effective 1 October 1934) and Coal Creek were added. Greymouth Borough existed until its abolition in the 1989 local government reforms, when the area was amalgamated with Grey County to form Grey District.

Out of 22 candidates, the first nine councillors were elected on 26 August 1868. Within days, it was discovered that according to the Municipal Corporations Act, 1867, three of those councillors had to retire by rotation on 10 September. All three councillors stood for re-election, but one of them was replaced by Edward Masters. At the first meeting of the council in the following week, Masters was elected the first Mayor of Greymouth by his fellow councillors. The office of mayor of Greymouth was the predecessor to the current office of mayor of Grey District.
