= 1879 New Zealand general election =

Elections

1879 general election
- 28 August – 15 September 1879

All 88 seats in the New Zealand House of Representatives
- Turnout: 66.5%
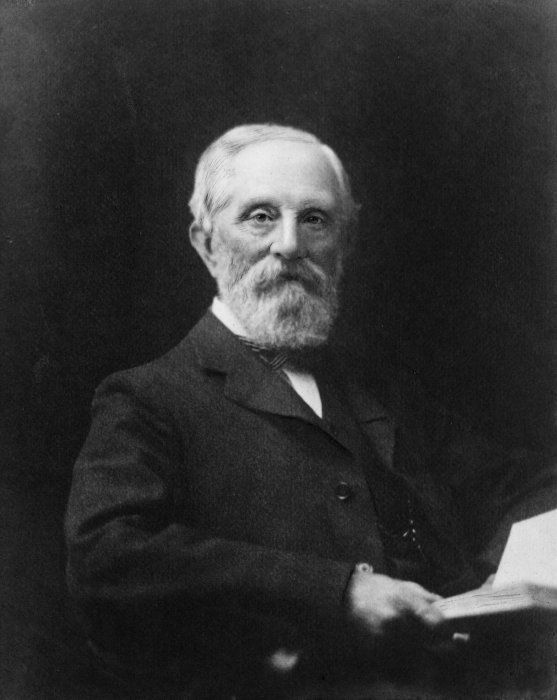

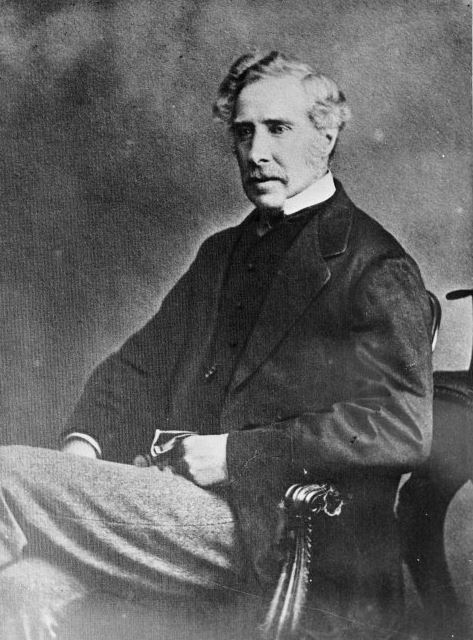
| | First party | Second party |
|---|---|---|
| Leader | John Hall | George Grey |
| Party | Conservative Independents | Greyite Independents |
| Leader since | 1879 | 1877 |
| Leader's seat | Selwyn | Thames |
| Seats won | 45 | 41 |
Premier before election
George Grey
Independent
Subsequent Premier
John Hall
Independent

The 1879 New Zealand general election was held between 28 August and 15 September 1879 to elect a total of 88 MPs to the 7th session of the New Zealand Parliament. The Māori vote was held on 8 September. A total of 82,271 (66.5%) European voters turned out to vote, plus 14,553 Māori voters. Following the election, John Hall formed a new government.

== Background ==
Formal political parties had not been established yet; this only happened after the 1890 election. The same 73 electorates were used as for the last election, which was held in 1875–76. In October 1875, Parliament passed the Representation Act 1875, which resolved to increase the size of Parliament to 88 representatives across the 73 electorates.

Two of the electorates were represented by three members each (Christchurch and Dunedin. A further eleven electorates were represented by two members each (Auckland West, Franklin, Grey Valley, Hokitika, Napier, City of Nelson, Thames, Wairarapa, Waitaki, Wanganui and City of Wellington). The remaining 60 electorates were represented by a single member each.

The election came about when George Grey's government was defeated in a no-confidence motion in July. He successfully requested a dissolution from the Governor of New Zealand, Sir Hercules Robinson.

Male Māori received universal suffrage (two years before European males were granted universal suffrage). The parliamentary term was reduced from five to three years.

== Date ==
The election was held between 28 August and 15 September. The date of election is defined here as the day on which the poll took place, or if there was no contest, the day of nomination. The earliest date was the nomination meeting in the Avon electorate, where William Rolleston was declared elected unopposed. The last elections were held on 15 September, where John Studholme and Edward George Wright were elected in the Gladstone and Coleridge electorates, respectively.

The election in the Maori electorates were held on 8 September.

== Candidates ==
At the nomination meeting in the Waimea electorate on 5 September 1879, Joseph Shephard, Albert Pitt, Oswald Curtis and Acton Adams were proposed, the latter three without their knowledge or consent, presumably by opponents of George Grey who had the support of Shephard. With Pitt, Curtis and Adams all formally withdrawing from the contest, the returning officer declared Shephard elected unopposed. In 14 seats there was only one candidate.

== Result ==
In the European electorates, the male population over 21 years of age was 116,008. Of those, 82,271 were enrolled and the turnout was 66.5%. The male Māori population was estimated at 14,553, of which 6,686 voted (turnout 46%). The Maori statistics are to be treated with caution, though, as not much emphasis was put into precise data gathering. When the first Maori roll was established for the 1949 election, for example, more votes were cast than were voters on the roll.

The initial results showed a virtual deadlock with no clear winner. Inititially the opposition seemed to have won slightly more seats than the "Greyites" (supporters of Grey) but not enough to claim a majority outright. However, after several days of negotiations a new ministry was formed by John Hall who had ensured support from 45 members, with 41 backing Grey and 2 Independent of either faction. Upon Grey's rejection, James Macandrew was unanimously elected leader of the liberals and sought to oust Hall and form a new ministry, but was denied after Hall induced four Auckland liberals (known as the "Auckland rats") to cross the floor.

George Grey was elected in both the Thames and the City of Christchurch electorates. Grey came first in the three-member Christchurch electorate (Samuel Paull Andrews and Edward Stevens came second with equal numbers of votes, and only 23 votes ahead of Edward Richardson). Richardson petitioned against Grey's return on technical grounds, as Grey had already been elected in the Thames electorate. The electoral commission unseated Grey on 24 October, with Richardson offered to fill this vacancy a few days later. Grey kept the Thames seat and remained a member of parliament through that constituency.

Laws were passed to confirm the results in three electorates where there was some doubt about the legitimacy of the results to confirm the winner (1879; the electorates were Marsden, Northern Maori and Western Maori); and to clarify the law about electoral petitions (1880):

| Member | Electorate | Affiliation | MP's term | Election date |
|---|---|---|---|---|
| William Montgomery | Akaroa | Greyite | Third | 1 September |
| William Sefton Moorhouse | Ashley | Conservative | Sixth | 11 September |
| William Speight | Auckland East | Greyite | First | 10 September |
| William John Hurst | Auckland West | Greyite | First | 6 September |
| James Wallis | Auckland West | Greyite | Second | 6 September |
| William Rolleston | Avon | Conservative | Fourth | 28 August |
| William Murray | Bruce | Conservative | Third | 9 September |
| James Bickerton Fisher | Buller | Greyite | First | 9 September |
| William Barron | Caversham | Greyite | First | 9 September |
| Alfred Saunders | Cheviot | Conservative | Third | 6 September |
| Samuel Paull Andrews | Christchurch | Greyite | First | 10 September |
| George Grey^{a} | Christchurch | Greyite | Third | 10 September |
| Edward Cephas John Stevens | Christchurch | Conservative | Third | 10 September |
| John Davies Ormond | Clive | Conservative | Fifth | 10 September |
| James William Thomson | Clutha | Greyite | Third | 11 September |
| Edward George Wright | Coleridge | Conservative | First | 15 September |
| William Gibbs | Collingwood | Conservative | Third | 11 September |
| Thomas Dick | City of Dunedin | Conservative | Third | 2 September |
| Richard Oliver | City of Dunedin | Conservative | Second | 2 September |
| William Downie Stewart | City of Dunedin | Conservative | Second | 2 September |
| Vincent Pyke | Dunstan | Greyite | Third | 3 September |
| Allan McDonald | East Coast | Greyite | First | 5 September |
| Joseph Tole | Eden | Greyite | Second | 5 September |
| Harry Atkinson | Egmont | Conservative | Fifth | 5 September |
| Benjamin Harris | Franklin | Greyite | First | 11 September |
| Ebenezer Hamlin | Franklin | Conservative | Second | 11 September |
| Edward Wakefield | Geraldine | Conservative | Second | 9 September |
| John Studholme | Gladstone | Conservative | Fourth | 15 September |
| Robert Trimble | Grey and Bell | Conservative | First | 8 September |
| Richard Reeves | Grey Valley | Greyite | Second | 5 September |
| Edward Masters | Grey Valley | Greyite | First | 5 September |
| James Fisher | Heathcote | Greyite | Second | 8 September |
| Richard Seddon | Hokitika | Greyite | First | 5 September |
| Robert Reid | Hokitika | Greyite | First | 5 September |
| Thomas Mason | Hutt | Conservative | First | 9 September |
| James Walker Bain | Invercargill | Conservative | First | 1 September |
| Charles Christopher Bowen | Kaiapoi | Conservative | Third | 5 September |
| Harry Allwright | Lyttelton | Greyite | First | 4 September |
| Walter Johnston | Manawatu | Conservative | Third | 6 September |
| William Henry Colbeck | Marsden | Greyite | First | 11 September |
| James Shanks | Mataura | Greyite | Second | 29 August |
| John Lundon | Mongonui and Bay of Islands | Greyite | First | 10 September |
| Richmond Hursthouse | Motueka | Conservative | Second | 2 September |
| Cecil de Lautour | Mount Ida | Greyite | Second | 30 August |
| Fred Sutton | Napier | Conservative | Second | 8 September |
| William Russell | Napier | Conservative | Second | 8 September |
| Albert Pitt | City of Nelson | Conservative | First | 6 September |
| Acton Adams | City of Nelson | Conservative | Second | 6 September |
| Andrew Richmond | Suburbs of Nelson | Conservative | Fifth | 8 September |
| Thomas Kelly | New Plymouth | Conservative | Fourth | 6 September |
| William Swanson | Newton | Greyite | Third | 2 September |
| Maurice O'Rorke | Onehunga | Greyite | Fifth | 9 September |
| Frederick Moss | Parnell | Greyite | Second | 4 September |
| Courtney Kenny | Picton | Conservative | Fourth | 30 August |
| James Macandrew | Port Chalmers | Greyite | Seventh | 5 September |
| William Jarvis Willis | Rangitikei | Conservative | First | 3 September |
| Patrick McCaughan | Riverton | Independent | First | 6 September |
| Seymour Thorne George | Rodney | Greyite | Second | 8 September |
| Henry Driver | Roslyn | Conservative | Fourth | 5 September |
| John Hall | Selwyn | Conservative | Fourth | 29 August |
| James Fulton | Taieri | Conservative | First | 9 September |
| George Grey^{a} | Thames | Greyite | Third | 2 September |
| John Sheehan | Thames | Greyite | Third | 2 September |
| Richard Turnbull | Timaru | Conservative | Second | 6 September |
| William Gisborne | Totara | Greyite | Third | 29 August |
| James Clark Brown | Tuapeka | Greyite | Fourth | 6 September |
| George Ireland | Waikaia | Independent | First | 8 September |
| John Blair Whyte | Waikato | Conservative | First | 8 September |
| George McLean | Waikouaiti | Conservative | Third | 6 September |
| Joseph Shephard | Waimea | Conservative | Second | 5 September |
| Frederick Alexander Whitaker | Waipa | Conservative | First | 10 September |
| Henry Bunny | Wairarapa | Greyite | Fifth | 4 September |
| George Beetham | Wairarapa | Conservative | Second | 4 September |
| Arthur Seymour | Wairau | Conservative | Third | 8 September |
| Samuel Shrimski | Waitaki | Greyite | Second | 5 September |
| Thomas William Hislop | Waitaki | Conservative | Second | 5 September |
| Reader Wood | Waitemata | Greyite | Fifth | 9 September |
| Hugh Finn | Wakatipu | Greyite | First | 12 September |
| Henry Hirst | Wallace | Conservative | First | 4 September |
| John Bryce | Wanganui | Conservative | Fourth | 5 September |
| John Ballance | Wanganui | Greyite | Third | 5 September |
| William Hutchison | City of Wellington | Greyite | First | 5 September |
| William Levin | City of Wellington | Conservative | First | 5 September |
| Alfred Brandon | Wellington Country | Conservative | Sixth | 11 September |
| Henare Tomoana | Eastern Maori | Conservative | Second | 8 September |
| Hone Tawhai | Northern Maori | Greyite | First | 8 September |
| Ihaia Tainui | Southern Maori | Greyite | Second | 8 September |
| Wiremu Te Wheoro | Western Maori | Greyite | First | 8 September |

^{a} George Grey was unseated on petition in Christchurch, as he had already been elected in the Thames electorate

== Government formation ==
Following the election, John Hall formed a new government on 8 October 1879, and Hall thus became the 12th Premier of New Zealand. The Hall Ministry stayed in power until 21 April 1882, i.e. some months after the next general election.
