= Clive (electorate) =

Clive was a parliamentary electorate in the Hawke's Bay Region of New Zealand from 1861 to 1881.

== Population centres ==
The electorate was centred on the town of Clive.

== History ==
Clive was formed for the 3rd New Zealand Parliament, i.e. in 1861. It existed until 1881. During this period, Clive was represented by one Member of Parliament, John Davies Ormond.

== Members ==
Key

Independent

Election	Winner
1861 election	John Davies Ormond
1866 election	John Davies Ormond
1871 election	John Davies Ormond
1876 election	John Davies Ormond
1879 election	John Davies Ormond
