= Mount Ida (electorate) =

Mount Ida is a former parliamentary electorate in the Otago region of New Zealand, from 1871 to 1893, and then from 1902 to 1908.

== Population centres ==
The Representation Act 1900 had increased the membership of the House of Representatives from general electorates 70 to 76, and this was implemented through the 1902 electoral redistribution. In 1902, changes to the country quota affected the three-member electorates in the four main centres. The tolerance between electorates was increased to ±1,250 so that the Representation Commissions (since 1896, there had been separate commissions for the North and South Islands) could take greater account of communities of interest. These changes proved very disruptive to existing boundaries, and six electorates were established for the first time, and two electorates that previously existed were re-established, including Mount Ida.

Mount Ida was a rural electorate in Central Otago. It is based on Naseby and uses its prior name. In the 1905 election, polling booths were in Naseby, Livingstone, Waipiata, Island Cliff, Duntroon, Rough Ridge, Gimmerburn, Kurow, Lauder Railway, Cambrian's, Omarama, Tokarahi, Georgetown, Wedderburn, Upper Kyeburn, Blackstone Hill, St Bathans, Maerewhenua, Ophir, Ida Valley, Ranfurly, Wharekuri, Ngapara, and Hāwea Flat.

== History ==
The electorate was first formed for the 1871 election. David Mervyn was the first representative. He served until the end of the parliamentary term in 1875. Mervyn was succeeded by Cecil de Lautour, who won the 1876 election and served until 1884. The next representative was Scobie Mackenzie, who was elected in 1884 and served three terms until 1893.

The electorate was abolished in 1893 and re-established in 1902. Between 1893 and 1902 most of the seat was in the Waihemo electorate, with some in the Tuapeka or Wakatipu electorates.

Alexander Herdman was the representative for the term starting with the 1902 election. Herdman was succeeded by Jack MacPherson in the 1905 election and served until the abolition of the electorate in 1908.

=== Members of Parliament ===
The electorate was represented by five Members of Parliament:

Key

Independent Conservative Liberal

Election	Winner
1871 election	David Mervyn
1876 election	Cecil de Lautour
1879 election	Cecil de Lautour
1881 election	Cecil de Lautour
1884 election	Scobie Mackenzie
1887 election	Scobie Mackenzie
1890 election	Scobie Mackenzie
(Electorate abolished 1893–1902)
1902 election	Alexander Herdman
1905 election	Jack MacPherson
(Electorate abolished 1908)

== Election results ==
=== 1890 election ===
1890 general election: Mount Ida
Party	Candidate	Votes	%	±%
Conservative	Scobie Mackenzie	819	53.42	
Liberal	Vincent Pyke	714	46.58	
Majority		105	6.84	
Turnout		1,533	70.06	
Registered electors		2,188		
