= Dunstan (New Zealand electorate) =

Dunstan was a parliamentary electorate in the Otago region of New Zealand, from 1871 to 1890.

== History ==
The Dunstan electorate was created in 1871 for the 5th Parliament. The first elected representative was Thomas Luther Shepherd, who won the 1871 general election. He retired at the end of the term in December 1875. Vincent Pyke succeeded him in 1876 and held the electorate until its abolition in 1890.

== Members of Parliament ==
Dunstan was represented by two MPs:

Key

Independent

Election	Winner
1871 election	Thomas Luther Shepherd
1875 election	Vincent Pyke
1879 election	Vincent Pyke
1881 election	Vincent Pyke
1884 election	Vincent Pyke
1887 election	Vincent Pyke
