= Riverton (New Zealand electorate) =

Riverton was a parliamentary electorate in the Southland region of New Zealand.

== Population centres ==
The electorate included the town of Riverton.

== History ==
Riverton existed from 1866 to 1881. The first representative was Donald Hankinson, who won the 1866 election. Hankinson resigned on 2 April 1870, before the end of the parliamentary term.

The resulting 1870 by-election was won by Lauchlan McGillivray, who was confirmed by the voters at the 1871 election. McGillivray was defeated at the 1876 election by Dr Samuel Hodgkinson. At the next election in 1879, Hodgkinson was in turn defeated by Patrick McCaughan. At the end of the parliamentary term in 1881, McCaughan retired and the electorate was abolished.

=== Election results ===
The electorate was represented by four Members of Parliament:

Key

Independent

Election	Winner
1866 election	Donald Hankinson
1870 by-election	Lauchlan McGillivray
1871 election	Lauchlan McGillivray
1876 election	Samuel Hodgkinson
1879 election	Patrick McCaughan
