= Edward Masters =

New Zealand politician (1838–1881)

New Zealand Parliament
Years	Term	Electorate	Party
1879–1881	7th	Grey Valley	Independent

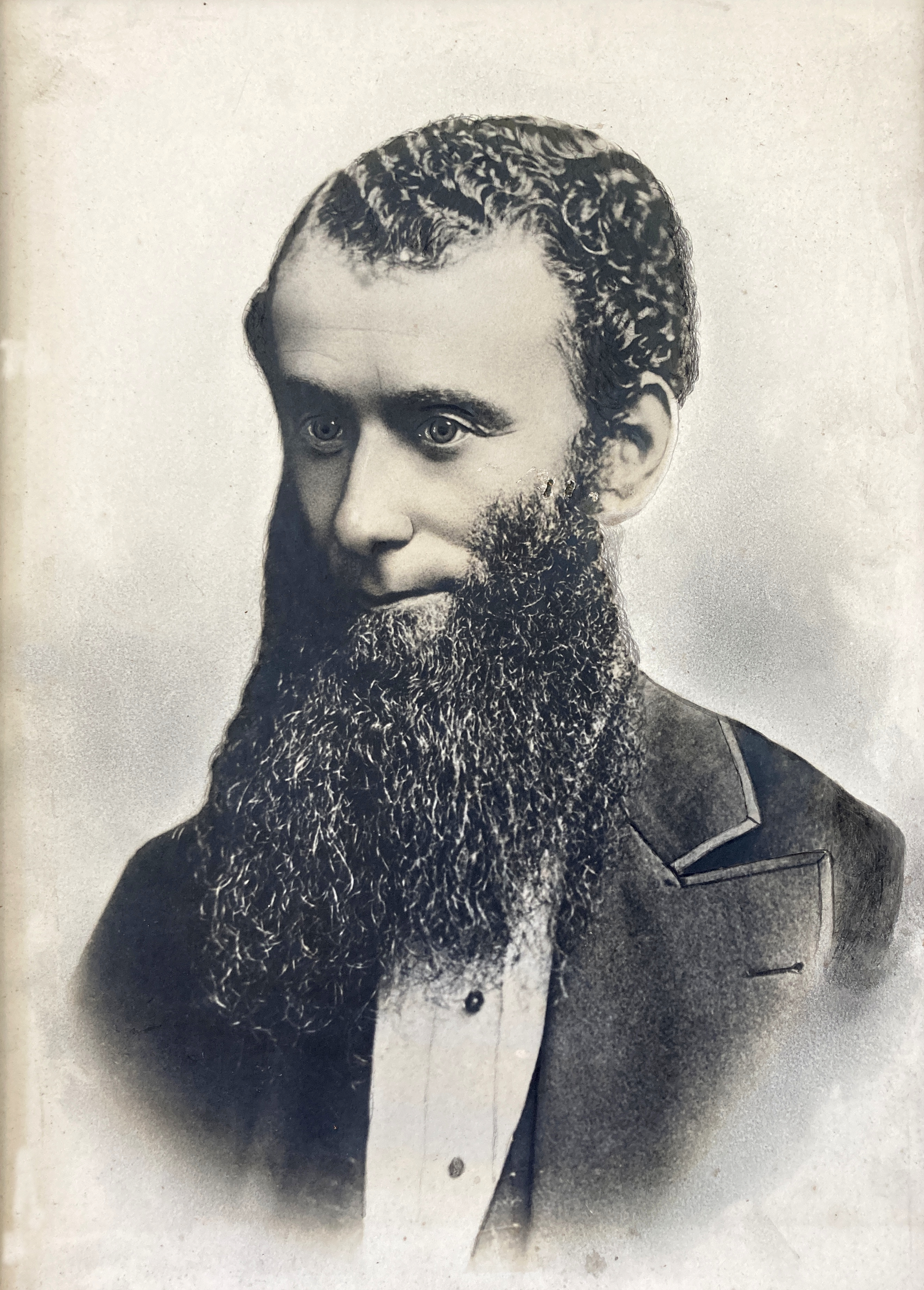
Edward Masters c. 1868–1870

Edward Masters (1838 – 27 November 1881) was a 19th-century Member of Parliament from Westland, New Zealand.

Masters was born in Melbourne in 1838. He was Mayor of Greymouth for several terms.

He represented the Grey Valley electorate from 1879 to 1881, when he resigned. He sent his resignation from Melbourne in May 1881, stating that his medical advisers feared for his life if he travelled to New Zealand in his poor state of health. Masters died later in the year in Richmond, Melbourne, on 27 November. He was 43 years old and is buried at Kew Cemetery.

New Zealand Parliament
Preceded by Charles Woolcock	Member of Parliament for Grey Valley; 1879–1881; Served alongside: Richard Reeves	Succeeded by Thomas S. Weston
