= Waikaia (electorate) =

Waikaia was a parliamentary electorate in the Southland region of New Zealand, from 1871 to 1881, and then from 1887 to 1890.

== History ==
The electorate was formed for the 1871 election. James Benn Bradshaw was the first representative; he retired at the end of the parliamentary term in 1875. Bradshaw was succeeded by Horace Bastings, who was elected on 14 January 1876 and who retired at the end of the parliamentary term in 1879. George Ireland was Bastings' successor in the 1879 election; Ireland died on 15 August 1880 while in office. The resulting 1880 by-election was won by Bastings. The Waikaia electorate was abolished in 1881. Bastings stood in the Dunedin Central electorate in the 1881 election and was defeated.

The Waikaia electorate was re-established for the 1887 election, which was won by Hugh Valentine. He served until the end of the term in 1890 when the electorate was abolished again. Valentine contested the Tuapeka electorate in the 1890 election and was successful.

=== Election results ===
The electorate was represented by four Members of Parliament:

Key

Independent

Election	Winner
1871 election	James Bradshaw
1876 election	Horace Bastings
1879 election	George Ireland
1880 by-election	Horace Bastings
(Electorate abolished 1881–1887)
1887 election	Hugh Valentine
