= Electoral history of Richard Seddon =

List of elections featuring Richard Seddon as a candidate

This is a summary of the electoral history of Richard Seddon, Prime Minister of New Zealand, (1893–1906).

== Parliamentary elections ==
=== 1876 election ===
1876 general election: Hokitika
Party	Candidate	Votes	%	±%
Independent	Edmund Barff	648	30.71	
Independent	Charles Button	586	27.77	
Independent	Robert Reid	527	24.98	
Independent	Richard Seddon	343	16.26	
Independent	Conrad Hoos	6	0.28	
Majority		59 (Note: As two members were elected, majority is the difference between the second and third candidate.)		
Registered electors		1,547 (Note: Electors had two votes each.)		

=== 1879 election ===
1879 general election: Hokitika
Party	Candidate	Votes	%	±%
Independent	Robert Reid	917	33.09	+8.11
Independent	Richard Seddon	800	28.87	+12.61
Independent	Peter Dungan	561	20.25	
Independent	Edmund Barff	403	14.54	−16.17
Independent	Hamilton Cuming	90	3.25	
Majority		239	8.63	
Turnout		2,771		
Registered electors		1,823		

=== 1881 election ===
1881 general election, Kumara
Party	Candidate	Votes	%	±%
Independent	Richard Seddon	700	52.88	
Independent	Edwin Blake	624	47.12	
Majority		76	5.74	
Turnout		1,324	58.40	
Registered electors		2,267		

=== 1884 election ===
1884 general election, Kumara
Party	Candidate	Votes	%	±%
Independent	Richard Seddon	667	57.31	+4.33
Independent	Edwin Blake	497	42.69	−4.43
Majority		170	14.60	+8.86
Turnout		1,164	62.61	+4.21
Registered electors		1,859		

=== 1887 election ===
1887 general election, Kumara
Party	Candidate	Votes	%	±%
Independent	Richard Seddon	Unopposed		
Registered electors		1,816		

=== 1890 election ===
1890 general election: Westland
Party	Candidate	Votes	%	±%
Liberal	Richard Seddon	1,098	59.10	
Conservative	Joseph Grimmond	760	40.90	
Majority		338	18.19	
Turnout		1,858	73.06	
Registered electors		2,543		

=== 1893 election ===
1893 general election: Westland
Party	Candidate	Votes	%	±%
Liberal	Richard Seddon	Unopposed		
Registered electors		4,186		

=== 1896 election ===
1896 general election: Westland
Party	Candidate	Votes	%	±%
Liberal	Richard Seddon	2,707	76.66	
Conservative	Joseph Grimmond	824	23.34	
Majority		1,883	53.33	
Turnout		3,531		
Registered electors		4,508		

=== 1899 election ===
1899 general election: Westland
Party	Candidate	Votes	%	±%
Liberal	Richard Seddon	Unopposed		
Registered electors		4,427		

=== 1902 election ===
1902 general election: Westland
Party	Candidate	Votes	%	±%
Liberal	Richard Seddon	2,983	92.63	
Independent	Frank Isitt	237	7.36	
Majority		2,746	85.27	
Turnout		3,220	69.87	
Registered electors		4,608		

=== 1905 election ===
1905 general election: Westland
Party	Candidate	Votes	%	±%
Liberal	Richard Seddon	3,420	92.05	−0.58
Independent	Harry Cowin	240	6.46	
Informal votes		55	1.48	
Majority		3,180	85.59	+0.32
Turnout		3,715	81.07	+11.20
Registered electors		4,582		

== Bibliography ==
- McRobie, Alan (1989). Electoral Atlas of New Zealand. Wellington: GP Books. ISBN 0-477-01384-8.
- Wilson, James Oakley (1985) [First ed. published 1913]. New Zealand Parliamentary Record, 1840–1984 (4th ed.). Wellington: V.R. Ward, Govt. Printer. OCLC 154283103.
