= Gerard George Fitzgerald =

New Zealand politician and journalist

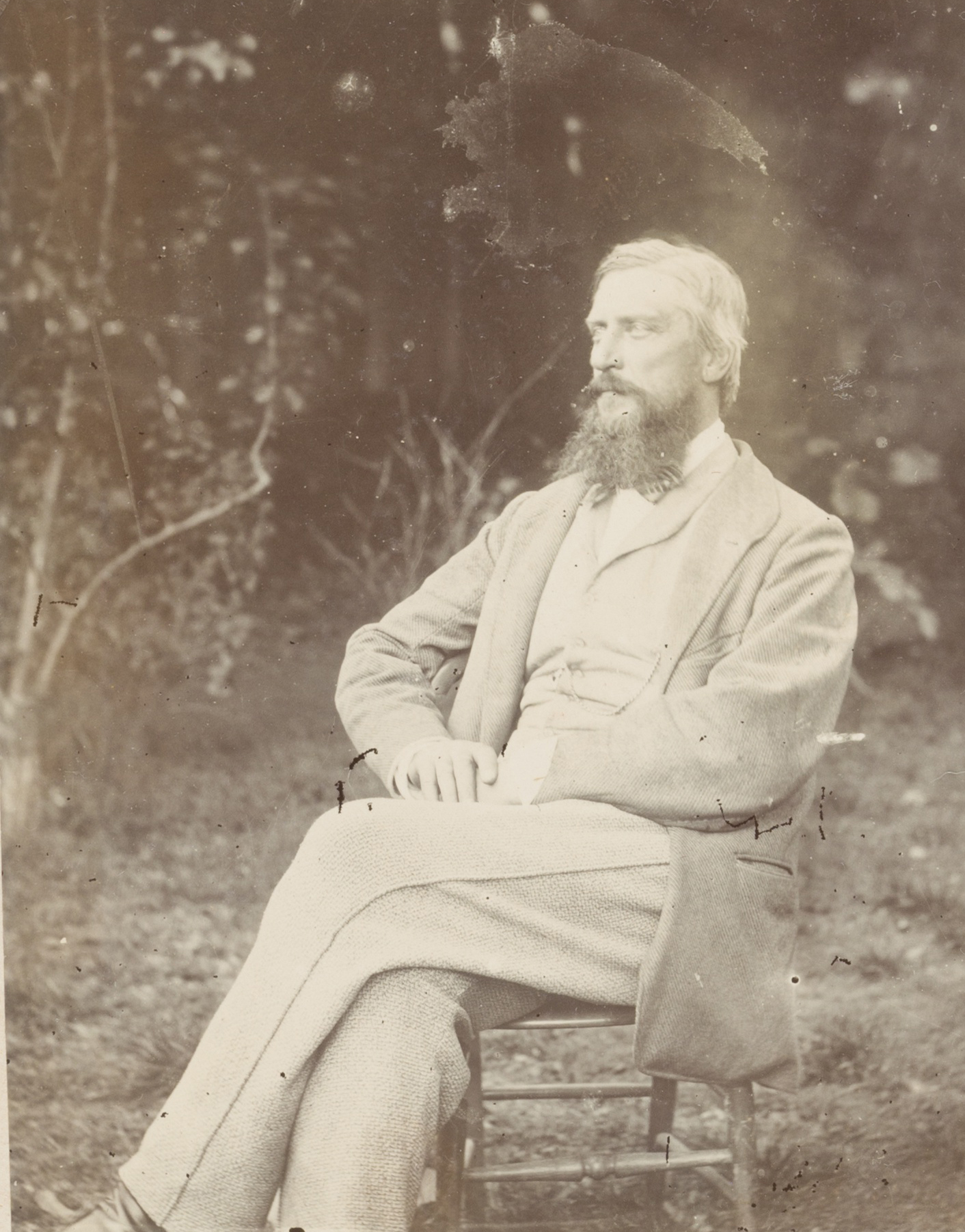
- Gerard George Fitzgerald c. 1865

Member of the New Zealand Parliament for Hokitika
- In office 9 December 1881 – 27 June 1884
- Preceded by: Robert Reid; Richard Seddon
- Succeeded by: John Bevan

Personal details
- Born: 10 October 1832 Bath, Somerset, England
- Died: 7 June 1904 (aged 71) Timaru Hospital, New Zealand
- Relations: James FitzGerald (brother); Richard Fitzgerald (grandfather); Sir John Gibbons, 2nd Baronet (grandfather)
- Profession: Journalist, magistrate

Gerard George Fitzgerald (10 October 1832 – 7 June 1904) was a 19th-century Member of Parliament in New Zealand. Like his brother James FitzGerald, he was a journalist of considerable ability, and co-founded The Southland Times in 1862. For the last 19 years of his life, he was editor of The Timaru Herald.

== Early life ==
Fitzgerald was born in Bath, Somerset, England, on 10 October 1832 and baptised on 6 January 1834 in Walcot, Bath. His father was Gerard Fitzgerald and his mother was Emily Fitzgerald (née Gibbons), the third wife of his father. His paternal grandfather, Richard Fitzgerald, was a member of the Irish House of Commons. His maternal grandfather, Sir John Gibbons, 2nd Baronet, was a member of the British House of Commons. An older half-brother, James FitzGerald (1818–1896), was from his father's second wife. He received his education at the grammar school in Bath. He arrived in Lyttelton on the Castle Eden on 14 February 1851, but left soon after for the Victorian gold rush. In Victoria, he bought and drove cattle to the gold fields, did some prospecting for gold, and acted as gold buyer for Melbourne-based banks.

== Life in New Zealand ==
New Zealand Parliament
Years	Term	Electorate	Party
1881–1884	8th	Hokitika	Independent

He returned to New Zealand in the early 1860s. On the suggestion of his brother, James FitzGerald, who had himself just established The Press in Christchurch, he established a telegraph news agency for New Zealand. In 1862, he was one of the founders of The Southland Times. FitzGerald gave up the proprietorship and joined the Otago gold rush, where he met again with George Sale, whom he knew from Victoria. When Sale was appointed Goldfields Commissioner for the gold fields on the West Coast, he offered Fitzgerald the second administrative role on the West Coast in 1867. Fitzgerald accepted and became magistrate, sheriff, warden and commissioner of crown lands, based in Hokitika. In January 1868, he was appointed Registration and Returning Officer. He was the returning officer for elections to Westland County in February 1868, November 1868, July 1870, December 1870, May 1871, and December 1872. He was then returning officer for the elections to Westland Province in January 1874. He also acted as returning officer for elections to the House of Representatives, with the first a by-election in the Westland Boroughs electorate in April 1868, followed by a parliamentary election in the Hokitika and Totara electorates in January and February 1871, and for the same two electorates in January 1876, and for a by-election in the Totara electorate in April 1877.

Fitzgerald filed for bankruptcy in February 1878, which put an end to his public service positions. In the following month, he resigned his position as vice-president of the Hokitika Savings Bank. His house at Gibson's Quay in Hokitika was sold at auction in May 1878. He was discharged from bankruptcy in June 1878.

At the same time as the bankruptcy was discharged, Fitzgerald first stood for the House of Representatives. Charles Button, one of the two representatives for the Hokitika electorate, resigned on 22 May when constituents passed a resolution that thanked him but expressed regret that he did not support Sir George Grey. The resulting by-election on 26 June was contested by Fitzgerald and Seymour Thorne George, a North Island resident who was the nephew of the premier, Sir George Grey. Thorne George won the election with a margin of 5% of the vote.

Fitzgerald stood in the 1879 election in the two-member Hokitika electorate, but was beaten by Richard Seddon and Robert Reid. He moved to Blenheim in about 1880 and took up journalism again, editing a local paper. He then became the editor of the Wanganui Chronicle.

He contested the 1881 by-election in the Grey Valley electorate, but was beaten by Thomas S. Weston. He was elected in the Hokitika electorate in the 1881 general election while he lived in Whanganui and represented the electorate until 1884, when he was defeated by John Bevan with a 4% margin of the votes.

He then became editor of the New Zealand Times in Wellington for one year, before becoming editor of The Timaru Herald in 1885 or 1886 in succession of William Henry Triggs. He remained in the latter position for 19 years until his death. Like his brother James, he was a journalist of considerable ability.

== Family and death ==
Fitzgerald married Jane Michie in 1864. She was lost, presumed drowned, in the sinking of the steamer Taiaroa in 1886 and though her remains were never found, her cat and some of her possessions were recovered, including a lady's handbag containing two handkerchiefs marked "Jane Fitzgerald." She was on her way from Wellington to be rejoined with her husband after he had furnished a house for them. By coincidence, his dwelling had been named Tararua Cottage in commemoration of the sinking of the SS Tararua three years earlier, which remains New Zealand's worst civilian shipping disaster.

Fitzgerald wrote his will on 17 May 1904 and made his niece Geraldine Fitzgerald of Christchurch, his brother James' daughter, the sole executor of his will. He died at Timaru Hospital on 7 June 1904 after having been ill for six weeks. Forceful as an editor and holding strong political opinions, he was otherwise a very private person. He had no children. He is buried at Timaru Cemetery.

New Zealand Parliament
Preceded by Robert Reid; Richard Seddon	Member of Parliament for Hokitika; 1881–1884	Succeeded by John Bevan
