= 1878 Hokitika by-election =

New Zealand by-election

- 26 June 1878
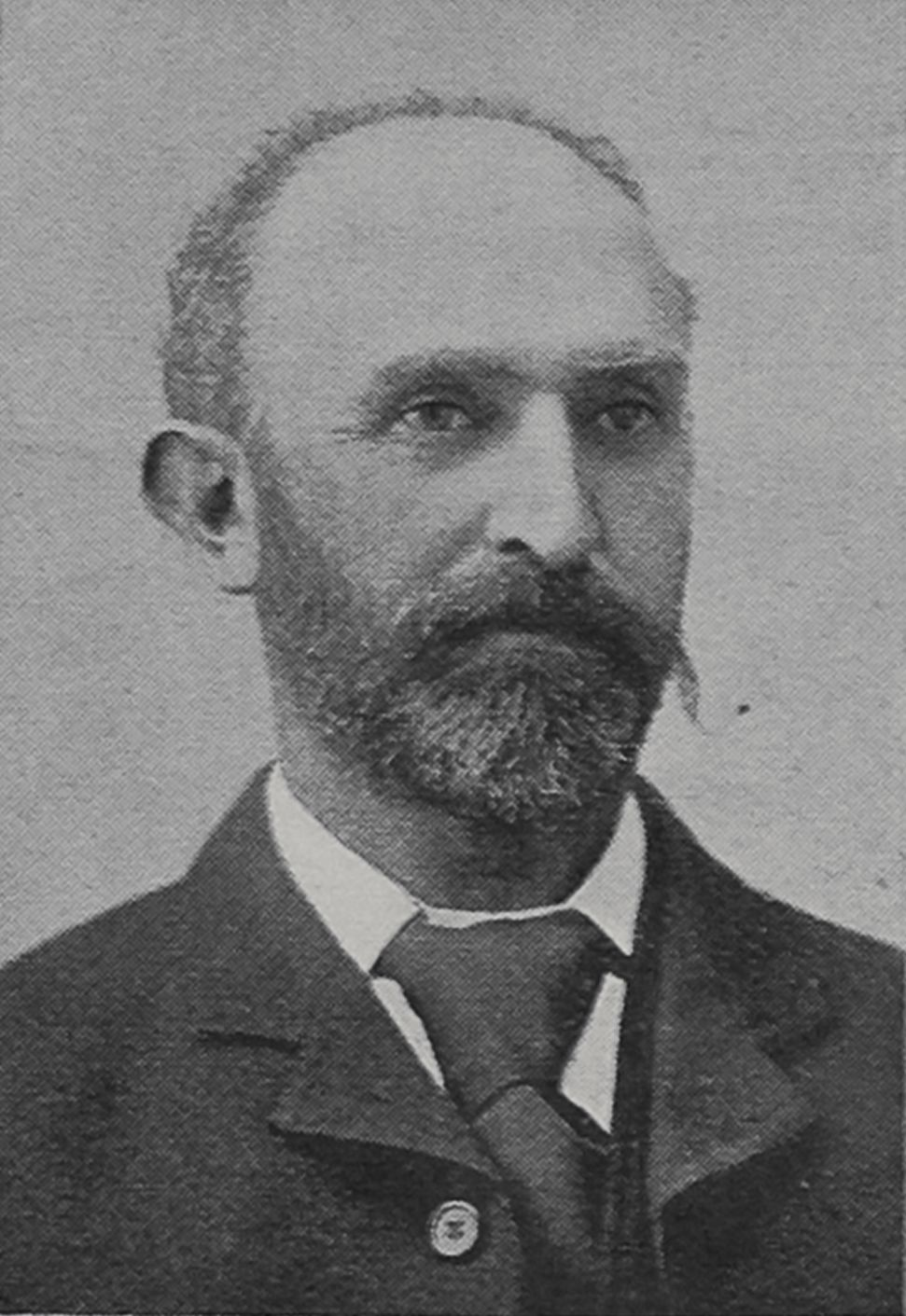

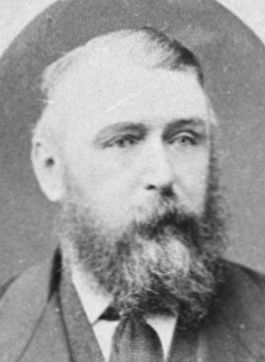
Candidate	Seymour Thorne George	Gerard George Fitzgerald
Party	Independent	Independent
Popular vote	884	789
Percentage	52.84	47.16
MP before election
Charles Button
Independent
Elected MP
Seymour Thorne George
Independent

The Hokitika by-election 1878 was a by-election held in the multi-member Hokitika electorate during the 6th New Zealand Parliament, on 26 June 1878. The by-election was caused by the resignation of incumbent MP Charles Button and was won by Seymour Thorne George, who defeated Gerard George Fitzgerald. Thorne George was suggested as a candidate by the premier, Sir George Grey; he was the Premier's nephew, and lived in the North Island.

== Background ==
Button had first been elected to the House of Representatives in the 1876 general election. He had contested the two-member Hokitika electorate with four other candidates, and as the second-highest polling candidate, he was successful; the other successful candidate was Edmund Barff. When Hokitika electorate constituents passed a resolution in 1878 that thanked Button but expressed regret that he did not support Sir George Grey, Button handed in his resignation on 22 May.

== Candidates ==
Electors presented a petition to Robert Reid, asking to allow him to be nominated, but he declined as his business affairs needed his attention. Reid had been one of the candidates in the 1876 election, and had been narrowly beaten into third place. Another person asked to stand was the shop keeper and lay preacher D. W. Virtue, but he also declined.

A local newspaper, the West Coast Times, mentioned that whilst Gerard George Fitzgerald was apparently interested, he would stand no chance. The newspaper was dismissive of Fitzgerald ("would not be likely to meet with general support") and questioned whether the returning officer would even accept his nomination; this referred to his bankruptcy earlier in the year. Fitzgerald was the first to formally declare his candidacy on 10 June 1878 by placing an advertisement in the West Coast Times. The following day, the West Coast Times ran the most critical editorial about Fitzgerald:

The electors are now asked to return a gentleman to Parliament who is rightly considered unfit for the public service, who was, in fact, if not in name, dismissed for conduct for which there is no excuse. He is quite competent to be a member of the House, but incompetent to sit on the Magistrate's Bench! Is Parliament become a refuge for the destitute? Is the Insolvency Court a half-way house to the Legislature? Does a long experience of questionable company tend to qualify a man to represent a large constituency in Parliament? Mr Fitzgerald is well known to every one in Hokitika and on the Coast. Why should he show his contempt for this constituency by offering them his services?

The premier at the time, Sir George Grey, was very popular with people on the West Coast. Robert Reid was a strong supporter of Grey, and Reid owned the West Coast Times' from 1874 to 1883, doing everything he could to support the Grey administration. A Hokitika man enquired by telegram whether Grey could recommend a good candidate from outside the area. Sir George replied:

My nephew Seymour Thorne George would be glad to represent your district if you sent him a requisition asking him to do so. He was with me when I visited your district in February last. G. Grey

The Grey River Argus was most critical of this situation. Thorne George, at the time in his mid-20s, was described by them as a "perfect nobody". Thorne George replied to the requisition by telegram from Wellington on 10 June, acceding to the request. He arrived in Hokitika by coach from Christchurch on 19 June and gave his first public speech on the following evening in the Hokitika town hall.

Richard Seddon, who had contested the 1876 election coming fourth, was noted as not being inclined to run in the by-election. Like Fitzgerald, Seddon was in financial difficulties and a few months later, in October, he filed for bankruptcy. As a staunch liberal and supporter of George Grey, Seddon organised support for Thorne George.

There was also a discussion whether to ask Button to stand again. The West Coast Times argued that the vote passed at the meeting that resulted in his resignation may not have been representative. The newspaper reported on 14 June that Button had decided against contesting the election.

Another candidate was Andrew Cumming, a well-known individual and for some years trading in Hokitika. S. Croumbie-Brown of Kumara announced himself as a candidate. A staff member of the Kumara Times, he was virtually unknown in the district.

== Nomination meeting and subsequent events ==
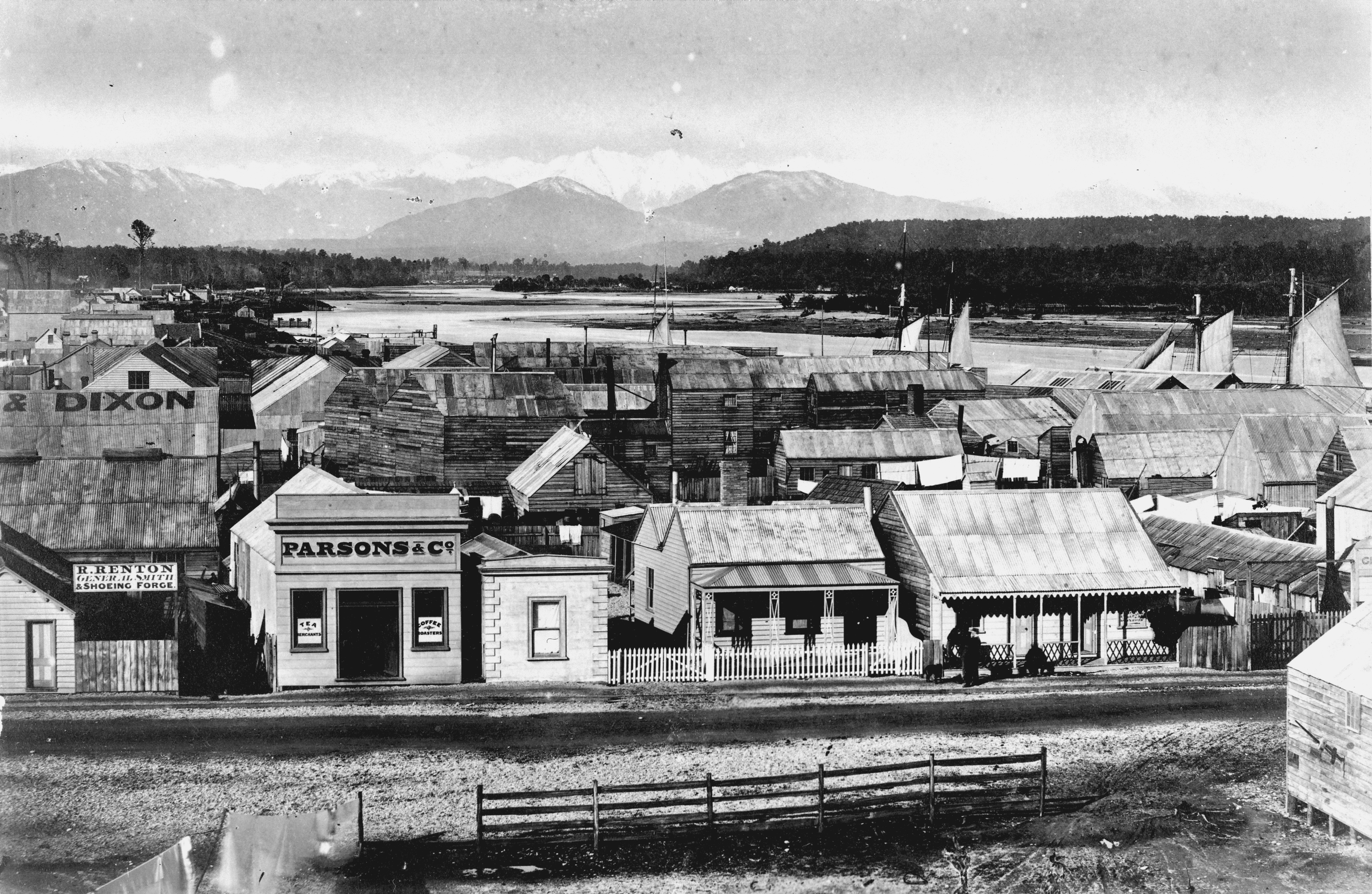
Hokitika township and the Hokitika River; photograph published as a wood engraving in the Official Handbook of New Zealand 1875

The hustings were erected outside the Hokitika Magistrate's Court building for the nomination meeting on 20 June at noon. Marcus Furlong South was the returning officer. Because of heavy rain, the nomination meeting was held inside the court, with the returning officer taking the bench. The merchant James Chesney nominated Thorne George, with the merchant Joseph Churches seconding the nomination. Fitzgerald was nominated by John Bevan and seconded by George Davidson, an engineer, blacksmiths and ironfounder. The third person to be nominated was Croumbie-Brown, but by then, the rain had stopped and the waiting crowd demanded forcefully for the remaining affairs to be held on the hustings. The returning officer moved the affairs outside and asked for a show of hands, which he declared in favour of Fitzgerald. A formal poll was asked for on behalf of Croumbie-Brown. Fitzgerald then gave an address to the electors, and towards the end, it started raining again. The other two candidates said that they would not keep the electors while it was raining, and the proceedings were terminated.

Cumming placed an advertisement the day after the nomination meeting giving reasons why he had withdrawn from the contest. Croumbie-Brown announced his resignation from the contest after a 22 June meeting held by Thorne George in Kumara in front of an alleged crowd of 1,200 people.

== Results ==
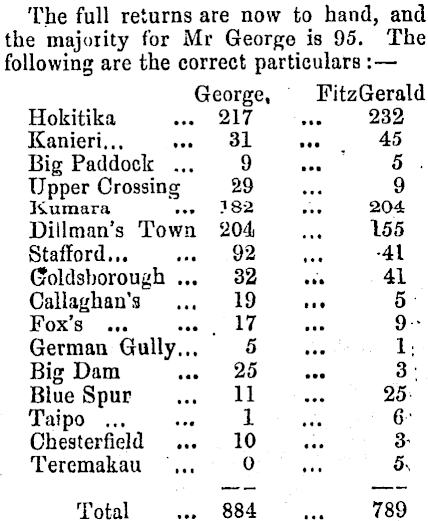
By-election results by polling booth

Polling day was Wednesday, 26 June 1878, and voting was done between 9 am and 4 pm. The only polling booth in Hokitika was at the Magistrate's Court building, but 13 further booths were throughout the electorate. There were 1,673 votes cast in the election by secret ballot. A New Zealand census had been held in 1878 and this had resulted in an updated electoral roll for the Hokitika electorate of 1,823 names. The turnout was thus over 91% at the by-election. Fitzgerald had a small majority at the Hokitika booth, but overall Thorne George won the by-election with a majority of just over 5% of the votes.

1878 Hokitika by-election
Party	Candidate	Votes	%	±%
Independent	Seymour Thorne George	884	52.84	
Independent	Gerard George Fitzgerald	789	47.16	
Majority		95	5.68	
Turnout		1,673	91.77	
Registered electors		1,823		

Thorne George represented the Hokitika electorate until the end of the parliamentary term. In the 1879 election, he announced that he would contest the Rodney electorate north of Auckland (where he was successful). There were four liberal candidates for the two seats in the Hokitika electorate, and Seddon sought and obtained an endorsement from George Grey for his candidacy: "You are worthy; stand yourself." The opposition candidate Robert Reid and Seddon were returned for the Hokitika electorate.
