= Westland South =

Westland South was a parliamentary electorate on the West Coast of New Zealand from 1868 to 1870.

== History ==
The Westland Representation Act 1867 introduced changes to the Waimea and Westland electorates. Their areas were reassigned and four electorates formed. Waimea lost some area, but continued to exist. Westland was abolished in 1867. A new electorate (Westland Boroughs) was established, and the Act stipulated that the sitting member (William Sefton Moorhouse) was transferred to it. Other new electorates, for which by-elections were to be held, were Westland North and Westland South.

Edmund Barff was elected in 1868. He served until the end of the parliamentary term in 1870, and the electorate was abolished. In 1871, Barff was defeated for Hokitika by John White.

== Members of Parliament ==
Westland North was represented by one Member of Parliament:

Election	Winner
1868 supplementary election	Edmund Barff (Independent)

== Election results ==
=== 1868 supplementary election ===
1868 Westland South election
Party	Candidate	Votes	%	±%
Independent	Edmund Barff	355	51.7	
Independent	Charles Button	332	48.3	
Turnout		687		
Majority		23		
