= Jack Nagel =

Jack Nagel may refer to:

- Jack Nagel (political scientist) (born 1944), American political scientist
- Jack Nagel (alpine skier) (1926-2004), American skier

== See also ==
- Jack Nagle (1917-1990), American basketball coach
