= William Gisborne =

New Zealand politician (1825–1898)

The Honourable William Gisborne
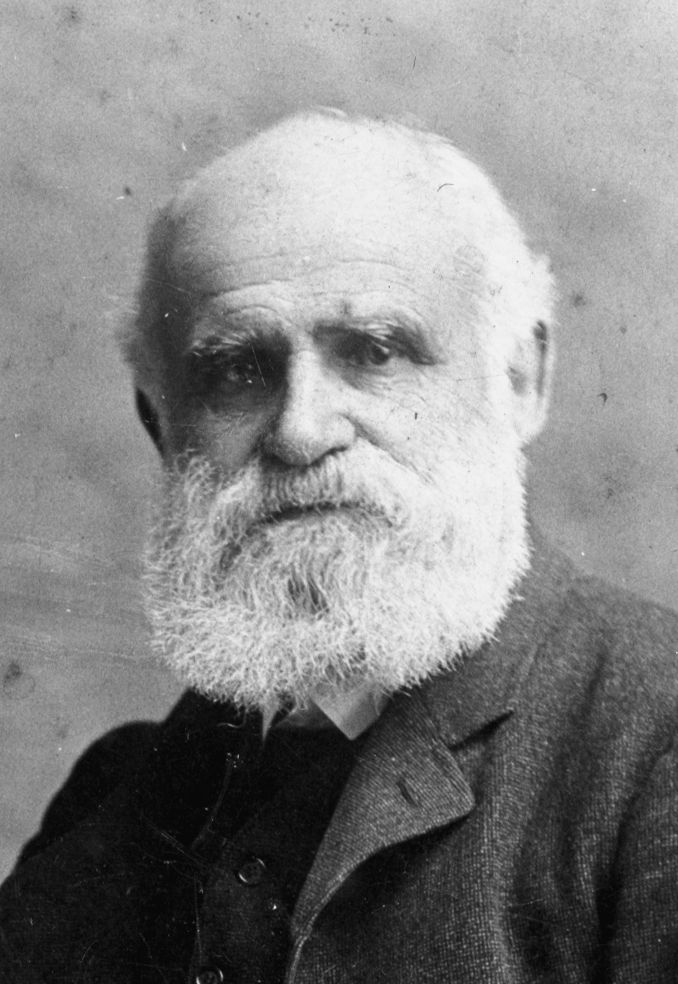
- William Gisborne ca 1895

Member of the New Zealand Legislative Council
- In office 2 July 1869 – 11 January 1871

Member of the New Zealand Parliament for Egmont
- In office 18 January 1871 – 10 September 1872
- Preceded by: New constituency
- Succeeded by: Harry Atkinson

Member of the New Zealand Parliament for Totara
- In office 1877 – 8 November 1881
- Preceded by: George Henry Tribe
- Succeeded by: Electorate abolished

Personal details
- Born: 13 August 1825 Saint Petersburg, Russia
- Died: 7 January 1898 (aged 72) Allestree Hall, Allestree, Derby, England
- Spouse: Caroline Gertrude Bridgen (m. 1861, d. 1908)
- Relations: Thomas Gisborne (grandfather); Thomas Gisborne the Younger (uncle); William Evans (brother-in-law)
- Occupation: public servant

William Gisborne (13 August 1825 – 7 January 1898) was the first New Zealand Cabinet Secretary from 1864 to 1869, Colonial Secretary of New Zealand from 1869 to 1872, and Minister of Public Works between 1870 and 1871. The city of Gisborne in New Zealand is named after him.

== Early life ==
Gisborne was born in 1825. He was the third son of Thomas John Gisborne (1789–1868) of Holme Hall, near Bakewell in Derbyshire, England. His mother was Sarah Gisborne (née Krehmer). His grandfather was Thomas Gisborne (1758–1846), who fought for the abolition of the slave trade in England. Thomas Gisborne the Younger (1790–1852) was an uncle who represented various constituencies in the House of Commons between 1830 and 1852. His eldest sister, Mary, married William Evans, who would later be made a baronet.

William Gisborne emigrated to Australia in 1842 and to New Zealand in 1847. He was initially secretary to Edward John Eyre, the lieutenant governor of New Munster Province. He was then appointed commissioner of Crown lands, a role for which he moved to New Zealand's capital, Auckland.

Gisborne returned to England for 1852 and 1853. Afterwards, he held various roles as a civil servant. He resigned from the civil service in 1869.

Gisborne married Caroline Gertrude Bridgen at St Mary's Church in the Auckland suburb of Parnell, and the couple had four children (one son, three daughters).

== Political career ==
By 1863 Cabinet had largely taken over the function of the Colonial Executive Council. This led to the establishment of the Cabinet Secretary in 1864 with Gisborne being the first appointee in the role. He resigned from the position in 1869 and left the civil service to take on the role of Colonial Secretary in the third Fox Ministry. He was appointed to the New Zealand Legislative Council on 2 July 1869, and resigned on 11 January 1871. A week later, he was elected to the New Zealand Parliament in the 1871 general election for the Egmont electorate. He resigned on 10 September 1872. In December 1875, Gisborne was a strong candidate for the Wellington mayoralty, but he fell out with the public over him favouring denominational education. In addition, he then announced himself as a candidate for the 1875 general election in the City of Wellington electorate, and that triggered a concerted effort to find a suitable mayoral opponent. When Gisborne lost the mayoral election against William Hutchison, he withdraw from the general election.

Gisborne then represented the Totara electorate from a 1877 by-election, following the death of George Henry Tribe. He was re-elected at the 1879 election and served until the end of that term of Parliament in 1881.

New Zealand Parliament
Years	Term	Electorate	Party
1871–1872	5th	Egmont	Independent
1877–1879	6th	Totara	Independent
1879–1881	7th	Totara	Independent

== Later life ==
He returned to England in 1881 following the death of his elder brother Francis. In 1892 he inherited Allestree Hall from his brother-in-law, Sir William Evans, 1st Baronet, and died there in 1898. His wife died in 1908. In 1870, the city of Gisborne in New Zealand was named after him. The township of Gisborne in Victoria, Australia, was named after Henry Fyshe Gisborne, who was a cousin of William Gisborne.

== Notes ==
New Zealand Parliament
New constituency	Member of Parliament for Egmont; 1871–1872	Succeeded by Harry Atkinson
