= Joseph Grimmond =

New Zealand politician

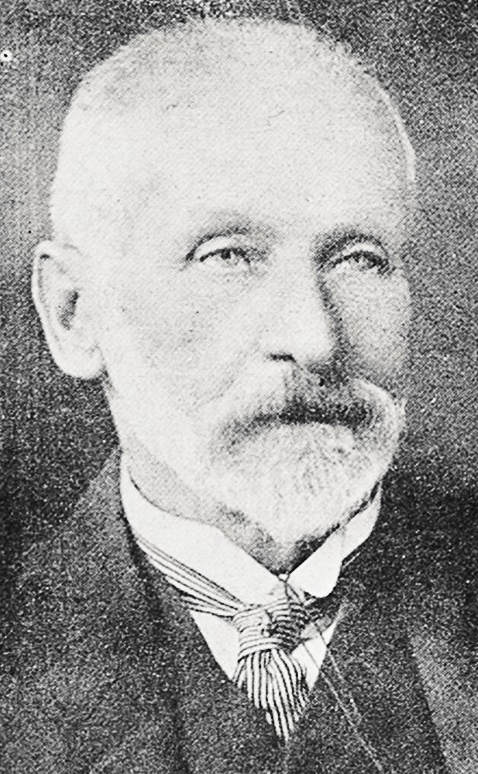
Joseph Grimmond

Joseph Grimmond (1843 – 27 November 1924) was a gold miner and politician from the West Coast, New Zealand. He was mayor of Ross for many years, represented the Hokitika electorate in the House of Representatives for one term, and was later called to the Legislative Council.

== Early life ==
Grimmond was born in 1843 in Drogheda, Ireland, the son of James Grimmond. He obtained his education at the Drogheda Blue Coat school and trained as an engineer.

He emigrated to Melbourne in 1859 on the Eagle and joined the gold rush. He came to New Zealand in 1861 and continued working on various gold fields, and came to the West Coast in 1865. He became involved in politics, and was a member of Westland County for many years, including five as its chairman. He was mayor of Ross for 13 years.

== Later life ==
New Zealand Parliament
Years	Term	Electorate	Party
1887–1890	10th	Hokitika	Independent

He stood unsuccessfully for the 1877 by-election for Totara.

He represented the Hokitika electorate in the House of Representatives from 1887 to 1890, when he was defeated for Westland by Richard Seddon. Grimmond stood again in the 1896 election, but was beaten by Seddon with more than a 50% margin of the vote.

Mary Grimmond, his first wife, fell seriously ill during the time of the 1893 election, hence Grimmond did not contest that election. She suffered increasing paralysis and died in November 1895. On 5 May 1898, he married Margaret (Maggie) Isabella Macfarlane, the eldest daughter of Hokitika's resident magistrate, Duncan Macfarlane.

He was appointed to the Legislative Council in 1918 and served until his death. He remained active until old age and in 1923 at the age of 80, he led a party of parliamentarians up the Franz Josef Glacier. He died suddenly in Ross on 27 November 1924. He was survived by his second wife.

New Zealand Parliament
Preceded by John Bevan	Member of Parliament for Hokitika; 1887–1890	Constituency abolished
