= 1875 Wellington mayoral election =

New Zealand local election

- 15 December 1875
- Turnout: 1,244
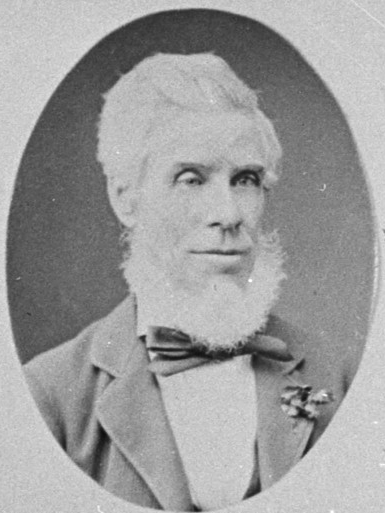

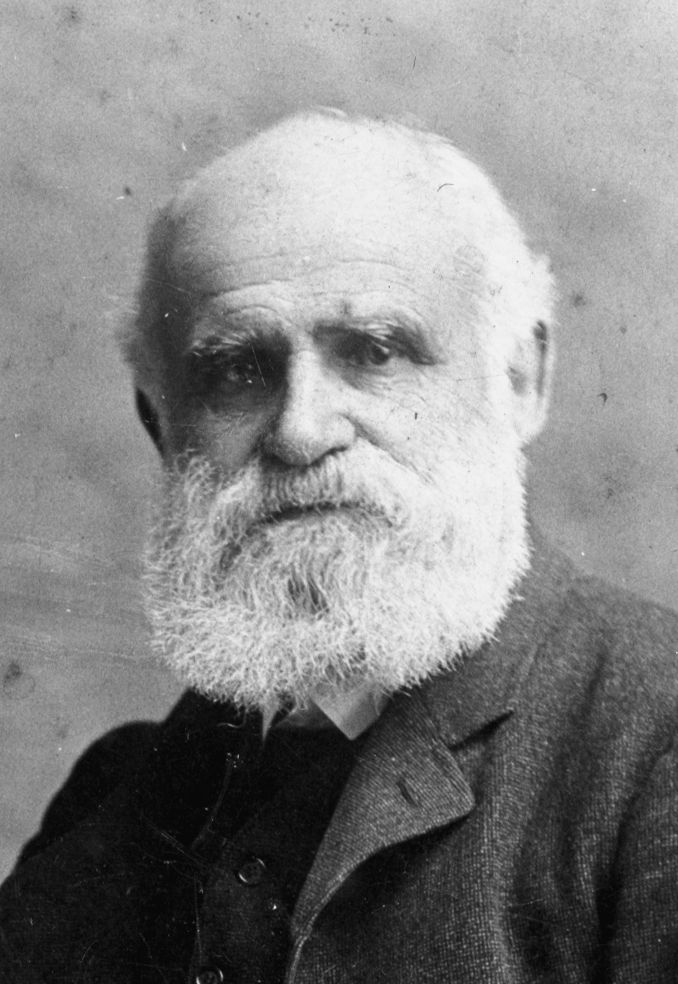
Candidate	William Hutchison	William Gisborne
Party	Independent	Independent
Popular vote	658	586
Percentage	52.89	47.11
Mayor before election
William Sefton Moorhouse
Elected mayor
William Hutchison

The 1875 Wellington mayoral election was the second election for the Mayor of Wellington held by public vote. The election was won by William Hutchison, who beat William Gisborne.

== Background ==
Initially, councillors elected one of their own as mayor towards the end of the year, and the role was usually awarded to the most senior councillor. The system changed with the introduction of The Municipal Corporations Acts Amendment Act, 1875, as that legislation stipulated that mayors had to be elected at large (i.e. by eligible voters).

The incumbent mayor, William Sefton Moorhouse, did not stand again, and a farewell dinner was given for him on 1 December. William Gisborne was a strong candidate for the role, but he fell out with the public over him favouring denominational education. In addition, he then announced himself as a candidate for the 1875 general election in the City of Wellington electorate, and that triggered a concerted effort to find a suitable opponent. A 'less than optimal' candidate was eventually secured in William Hutchison, who had been in Wellington for less than two years, and whose newspaper, the Tribune, had failed during that time. One of the local newspapers, The Evening Post, was a very strong supporter of Gisborne, and lost no opportunity to outline the failings of Hutchison to the public.

== Election results ==
The following table gives the election results:

1875 Wellington mayoral election
Party	Candidate	Votes	%	±%
Independent	William Hutchison	658	52.89	
Independent	William Gisborne	586	47.11	
Majority		72	5.79	
Turnout		1,244		

The election was held on 15 December. Hutchison beat Gisborne, and The Evening Post commented that this came as no surprise as Gisborne's stance on education had been misrepresented and twisted without scruple. The defeat caused Gisborne to withdraw from the general election. In December 1876, Hutchison was re-elected unopposed for a second term as mayor.
