= Charles Button =

New Zealand politician, solicitor, judge (1838–1920)

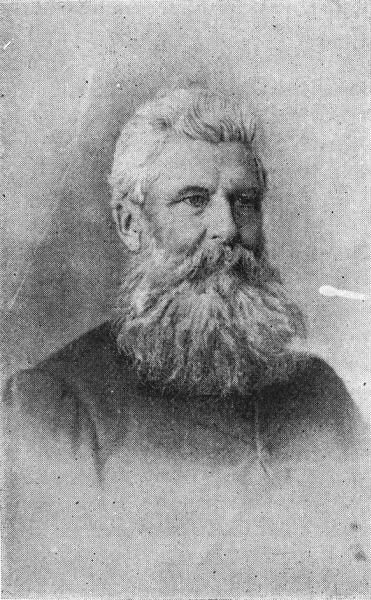
- Charles Button in circa 1890s

Member of the New Zealand Parliament for Hokitika
- In office 14 January 1876 – 22 May 1878
- Preceded by: John White
- Succeeded by: Seymour Thorne George

Member of the New Zealand Parliament for City of Auckland
- In office 28 November 1893 – 14 November 1896
- Preceded by: Alfred Cadman, John Shera, Thomas Thompson
- Succeeded by: James Job Holland, William Crowther, Thomas Thompson

4th Mayor of Hokitika
- In office 1869–1870
- Preceded by: Evan Prosser
- Succeeded by: Samuel Boyle

1st Mayor of Birkenhead
- In office 1888–1901
- Preceded by: new role
- Succeeded by: Joseph Witheford

Personal details
- Born: 23 August 1838 Launceston, Van Diemen's Land
- Died: 27 December 1920 (aged 82) Prospect Terrace, Mount Eden, New Zealand
- Resting place: Waikaraka Cemetery Onehunga; Plot Location Area 1 Block G Plot 67A, Onehunga
- Spouse: Louisa Button
- Children: two
- Occupation: Solicitor
- Profession: Solicitor; Judge

Charles Edward Button (23 August 1838 – 27 December 1920) was a solicitor, Supreme Court judge, Mayor of Hokitika and later Birkenhead, and an independent conservative Member of Parliament in New Zealand. Born in Tasmania, he came to New Zealand with his wife in 1863. He first lived in Invercargill, then in Westland, and after a brief period in Christchurch, he settled in Auckland. He was an MP for two periods, and when he was first elected to Parliament, he beat his colleague, friend, political opponent, and later Premier Richard Seddon; this was the only election defeat ever suffered by Seddon.

== Early life ==
Button was born in Launceston, Tasmania, in 1838, the seventh son of Thomas Button. His father was a member of the first municipal council in Launceston, and his uncle William Stammers Button was the first Mayor of Launceston. He received his education at Hobart High School and was then trained as a solicitor at Douglas, Dawes and Miller in Launceston. He married Louisa Cowell, a daughter of Henry Cowell of Launceston, in 1862.

== Legal practice in New Zealand ==
After running his own practice for a short time, Button emigrated to Invercargill, New Zealand, in 1863, where he continued to work in law. In 1865, he moved to Hokitika, and became a specialist in mining law. He practised with Walter Reid, who later became New Zealand's first Solicitor-General.

He moved to Christchurch in 1880 and had his office in Gloucester Street. Early in 1881, he moved into the offices of Henry Wynn-Williams in Hereford Street. He left Christchurch late in 1883 and moved to Auckland. In Auckland, he joined the firm of Whitaker and Russell. He later had his own practice under the banner of Buddle, Button and Co.

On 12 March 1907, Button became a judge at the Supreme Court. This was a temporary replacement for another judge who was overseas, and he retired after one or two years of service.

== Political career ==
New Zealand Parliament
Years	Term	Electorate	Party
1876–1878	6th	Hokitika	Independent
1893–1896	12th	City of Auckland	Independent

Button first stood for Parliament in the 1868 supplementary election, which was held in the newly established Westland South electorate. On nomination day (30 March) Edmund Barff and Button were nominated, and after a show of hands in favour of Button (41 votes to 5), a poll was demanded. Barff was subsequently elected the following week.

Button was elected in the Hokitika electorate for the Westland County for five months in 1869, and the Totara electorate in 1870–1872. He was chosen as the fourth Mayor of Hokitika in 1868–1869.

He contested the two-member Hokitika electorate in 1876 with Barff, Richard Seddon, Robert Reid and Conrad Hoos. Button had known Seddon professionally, as they were both lawyers and often argued cases as opponents. Although of differing political views, Button and Seddon became lifelong friends. Barff and Button were returned, with Reid coming third and Seddon fourth. Thus Button (and Barff) caused Seddon's only ever defeat at an election; Seddon is to date New Zealand's longest-serving Prime Minister. When Hokitika electorate constituents passed a resolution in 1878 that thanked Button but expressed regret that he did not support Sir George Grey, Button handed in his resignation. The resulting by-election was won by Seymour Thorne George.

When Birkenhead Borough Council was formed in 1888, Button was elected unopposed as the borough's first mayor on 9 May. He remained the borough's mayor for 12 years until he resigned in January 1901; he was succeeded by Joseph Witheford.

He was elected to the multi-member City of Auckland electorate in 1893, but was defeated in 1896.

== Community involvement ==
Button was interested in science, especially in chemistry and electricity. For 40 years from 1863, he gave lectures to the public and caused excitement in the early years when he demonstrated electric light. He was active in the Presbyterian church and was an elder in Hokitika and at St Paul's in Christchurch. He led the Hokitika choir under Bishop Harper. In Auckland, he supported the local YMCA.

== Death ==
Button died on 27 December 1920; his last residence was in Prospect Terrace in Mount Eden. He is buried at Waikaraka Cemetery in Onehunga. His wife had died in 1910. He was survived by a daughter and a son.

== Notes ==
New Zealand Parliament
Preceded by John White	Member of Parliament for Hokitika; 1876–1878; Served alongside: Edmund Barff	Succeeded by Seymour Thorne George
