= Duncan Macfarlane =

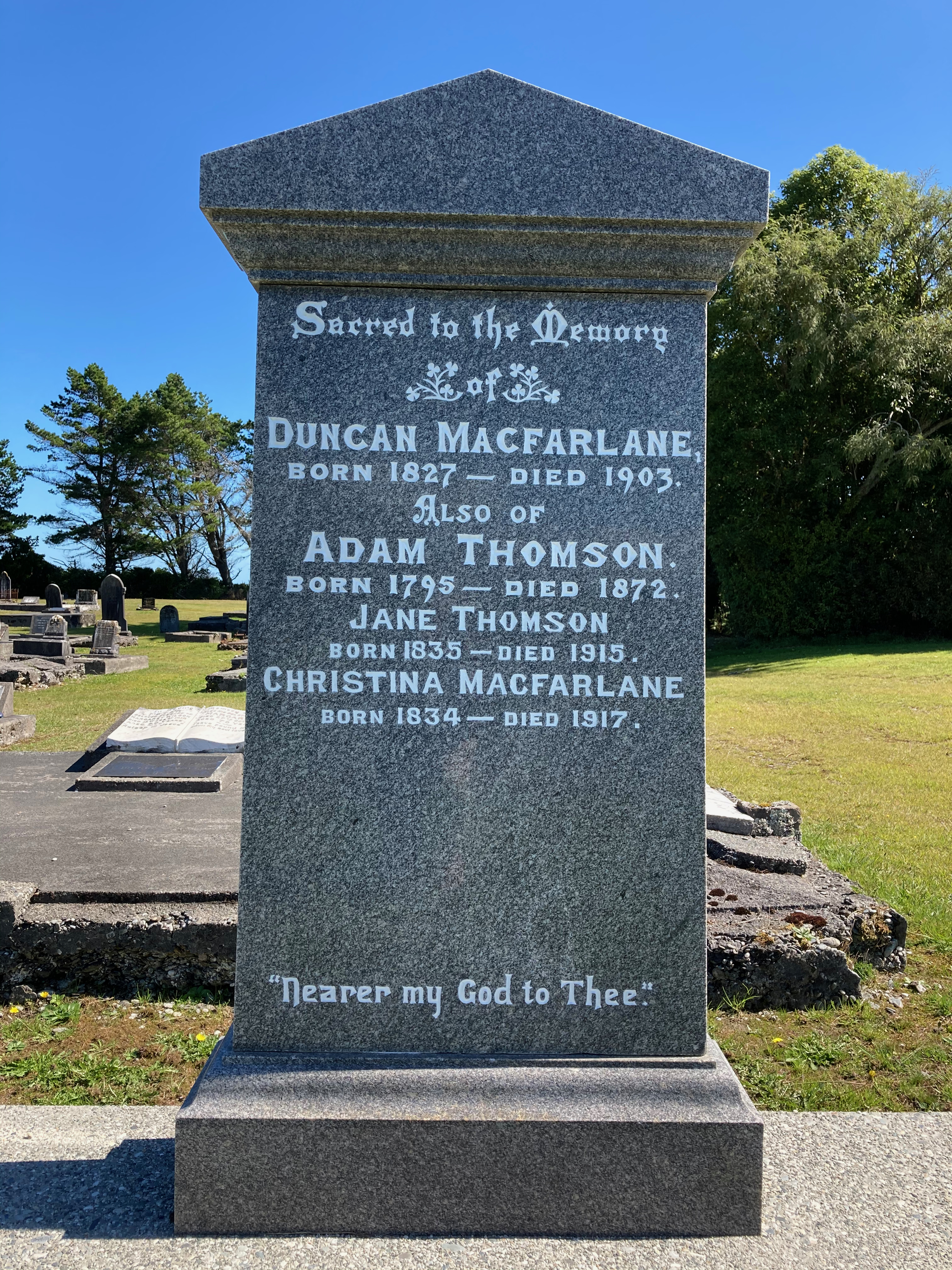
Grave of Duncan and Christina Macfarlane, Hokitika Cemetery, 2021

Duncan MacFarlane (15 January 1827 – 3 May 1903) was a New Zealand grocer, merchant, government agent, farmer and magistrate.

He was born in Dumbarton, Dunbartonshire, Scotland on 15 January 1827. He married Christina Thomson in 1858. His eldest daughter married Joseph Grimmond in May 1898.

He died in Hokitika in 1903.
