= 1877 Totara by-election =

New Zealand by-election

The 1877 Totara by-election was a by-election held on 30 April 1877 in the Totara electorate on the West Coast of New Zealand during the 6th New Zealand Parliament.

The by-election was caused by the death of the incumbent MP George Henry Tribe on 19 March 1877.

The by-election was won by William Gisborne. The polling place at Saltwater Creek recorded only a single vote (for Gisborne). The partial result below has a majority of 57 for Gisborne, although a late return from Hunt's Beach at Jackson's Bay resulted in his majority being 83 or 84.

== Results ==
1877 Totara by-election
Party	Candidate	Votes	%	±%
Independent	William Gisborne	190	48.10	
Independent	John McGaffin	133	33.7	
Independent	Joseph Grimmond	72	18.2	
Turnout		395		
Majority		57	14.4	
