= John Bevan (politician) =

New Zealand politician

John Bevan JP

Member of the New Zealand Parliament for Hokitika
- In office 22 July 1884 – 26 September 1887
- Preceded by: Gerard George Fitzgerald
- Succeeded by: Joseph Grimmond

Personal details
- Born: 1837; Jersey, Channel Islands
- Died: 16 July 1911 (aged 74); Hokitika, New Zealand
- Spouse: Anne Bevan
- Children: two
- Occupation: Auctioneer and merchant

John Bevan JP (1837 – 16 July 1911) was a 19th-century member of the House of Representatives. He was an auctioneer and merchant from Hokitika on the West Coast of New Zealand.

== Early life and commercial career ==
Bevan was born in Jersey on the Channel Islands in 1837 into a Welsh family. He received his education at Jersey Grammar School and emigrated to Victoria in Australia in 1857 before moving to Hokitika in New Zealand in circa 1865. He entered a partnership with Michael Pollock and they traded as auctioneers and merchants under the banner of Pollock and Bevan in Hokitika's Revell Street. He remained in Hokitika for the rest of his life.

== Political career ==
New Zealand Parliament
Years	Term	Electorate	Party
1884–1887	9th	Hokitika	Independent

Bevan belonged to many organisations. He was a longstanding member of the Westland Board of Education and for some time was the board's chairman. He was a member of the High School Board. He was a member of the Westland Land Board and got voted onto the Hokitika Borough Council. He was president of the Westland Hospital Board of Trustees. He was a Visiting Justice to Hokitika Prison and an official visitor to the local mental hospital.

Bevan contested the 1884 election in the Hokitika electorate against the incumbent, Gerard George Fitzgerald, and James Clarke. Fitzgerald, a brother of prominent politician James FitzGerald, had lived in Hokitika until 1880 but was a newspaper editor in Wanganui by the time he was elected in 1881 and remained a North Island resident. Bevan had a 4 percentage point margin over Fitzgerald, with Clarke coming a distant third. He represented the Hokitika electorate until 1887, when he was defeated by Joseph Grimmond 830 votes to 610.

== Freemasonry ==
Bevan was a District Grand Master of Freemasons in Westland.

== Family and death ==
On 7 May 1900, Bevan married the widow Anne Clery (née Handley) at All Saints' Church. Bevan suffered a long and serious illness in 1909 and never fully recovered from it. He died at Hokitika on 16 July 1911 aged 74. He was survived by his wife Anne and two stepchildren. His funeral at Hokitika Cemetery was an Anglican service with Masonic ceremony, largely attended by Freemasons from throughout Westland. Anne Bevan died in Dunedin in 1928.

New Zealand Parliament
Preceded by Gerard George Fitzgerald	Member of Parliament for Hokitika; 1884–1887	Succeeded by Joseph Grimmond
