= Seymour Thorne George =

New Zealand politician (1851–1922)

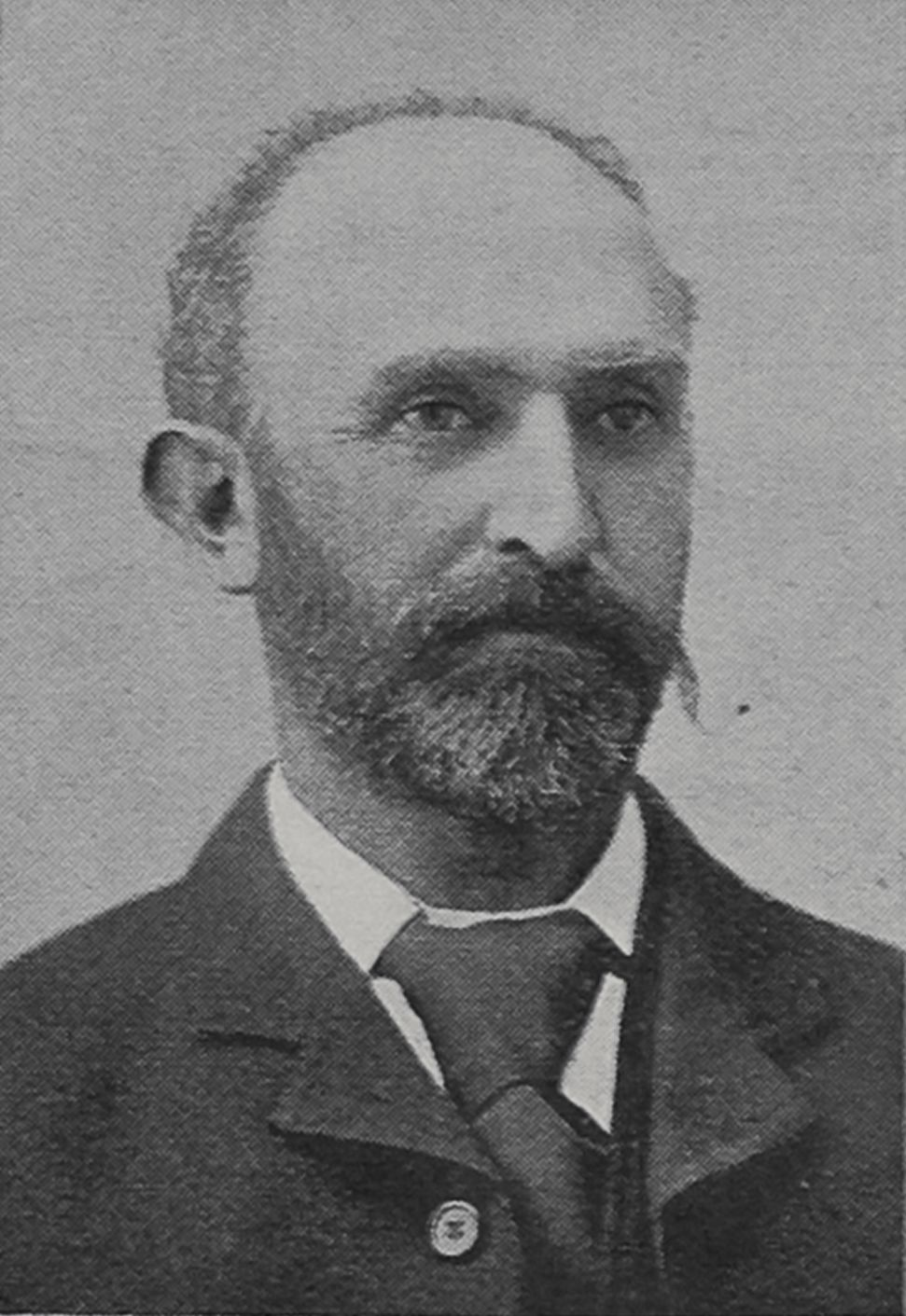
- Seymour Thorne George in 1899

Member of the New Zealand Parliament for Hokitika
- In office 26 June 1878 – 15 August 1879
- Preceded by: Charles Button
- Succeeded by: Robert Reid; Richard Seddon
- Majority: 95 (5.68%)

Member of the New Zealand Parliament for Rodney
- In office 8 September 1879 – 27 June 1885
- Preceded by: John Sheehan
- Succeeded by: William Pollock Moat

Personal details
- Born: 10 October 1851 Somersetshire, England
- Died: 2 July 1922 (aged 70) Parnell, New Zealand
- Resting place: Purewa Cemetery
- Spouse: Annie Maria Matthews (m. 1872)

Seymour Thorne George (10 October 1851 – 2 July 1922) was a New Zealand politician. The premier, Sir George Grey, was his wife's half-uncle and adoptive father, and that relationship resulted in Thorne George representing the South Island electorate of Hokitika despite him being based in the North Island. He later represented the Rodney electorate. Thorne George was later Mayor of Parnell.

== Early life ==
Thorne George was from Somersetshire. His father was George Thorne George. He received his education at Cheltenham College in Gloucestershire, England with a view of joining the Royal Engineers, but he had an accident playing soccer, abandoned his studies, and started work as a civil engineer in London.

== Life in New Zealand ==
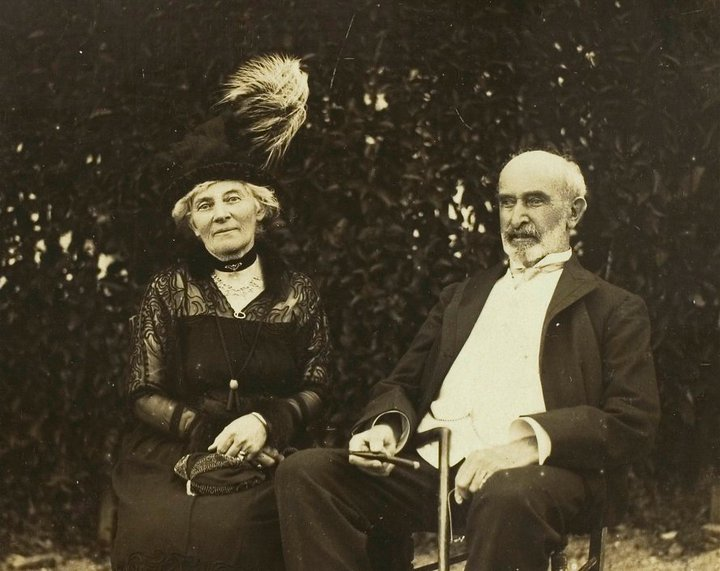
Annie and Seymour Thorne George

His father was a friend of Sir George Grey, who had been Governor of New Zealand and who temporarily returned to England in 1859. On the advice of Grey, Thorne George moved to New Zealand. For some years, he was the estate manager for Grey on Kawau Island. On 3 December 1872, he married Annie Maria Matthews (1853–1938), who was the daughter of Sir Godfrey Thomas, the half brother of George Grey. After Thomas' death in 1861, Grey had adopted Annie and had raised her. Seymour and Annie had a daughter, Julia Thorne George, who was born in 1874 in Sir George Grey's Mansion house on Kawau Island.

== Political career ==
New Zealand Parliament
Years	Term	Electorate	Party
1878–1879	6th	Hokitika	Independent
1879–1881	7th	Rodney	Independent
1881–1884	8th	Rodney	Independent

Grey was very popular with people on the West Coast. After a seat in the House of Representatives became available through a resignation in the Hokitika electorate, a Hokitika man enquired by telegram whether he could recommend a good candidate from outside the area. Sir George replied:

My nephew Seymour Thorne George would be glad to represent your district if you sent him a requisition asking him to do so. He was with me when I visited your district in February last. G. Grey

Thorne George represented the Hokitika electorate from 1878 by-election to 1879. He then represented the Auckland electorate of Rodney from 1879 to 1884. He contested the 1884 election in the Parnell electorate, but was defeated by the incumbent, Frederick Moss. He was then appointed to the Legislative Council, from 1903 to 1917.

Thorne George was Mayor of Parnell in 1887–1888 and 1891–1892. He died at his home in Parnell on 2 July 1922, and was buried at Purewa Cemetery.

New Zealand Parliament
Preceded by Charles Button	Member of Parliament for Hokitika; 1878–1879; Served alongside: Edmund Barff	Succeeded by Robert Reid; Richard Seddon
Preceded by John Sheehan	Member of Parliament for Rodney; 1879–1884	Succeeded by William Pollock Moat
