= John White (New Zealand politician) =

New Zealand Parliament
Years	Term	Electorate	Party
1871–1875	5th	Hokitika	Independent

John White (1830 – 4 September 1876) was a 19th-century member of the House of Representatives from the West Coast, New Zealand.

White was born in England in 1830, the son of Richard White of London. He came to Hokitika as a purser for the Intercolonial Steamship Company running the Panama route and remained there as the company's shipping agent.

He gained a public profile through his intelligent letters to the editor, which he signed with his own name; at the time, it was common for writers to use pen names. After Hokitika was incorporated as a borough council in August 1868, White stood for election in October of that year and was returned as one of the new councillors. He resigned a year later to become a member of the Westland County Council (a predecessor of Westland Province), where he served as a member from 10 November 1869 to 8 December 1870.

White and Edmund Barff contested the general election held on 25 January 1871 in the Hokitika electorate, with White being successful. He represented the electorate until the end of the term in 1875 when he retired. He was known in the House as "Honest John".

When the Westland Province was inaugurated, White stood for election in January 1874 for one of the three seats in the Hokitika electorate and was returned at the head of the poll. He remained a member of the provincial council until his death. He was the first Speaker of the Provincial Council (24 February 1874 – 8 June 1874) until he resigned to become a member of the short-lived first Westland Executive Council in June 1874. The Provincial Council was adjourned after three sessions in April 1875 and never met again before it was abolished shortly after White's death. Hence, White had practically retired from public life when he retired from the House of Representatives.

He died at his residence in Revell Street in Hokitika on 4 September 1876 from asthma after a short illness of about four weeks. The funeral service was held at St Mary's Catholic Church and he was buried at Hokitika Cemetery.

== Notes ==
New Zealand Parliament
New constituency	Member of Parliament for Hokitika; 1871–1875	Succeeded by Edmund Barff; Charles Button
