= Totara (electorate) =

Totara was a parliamentary electorate in the West Coast of New Zealand from 1871 to 1881. It was represented by two Members of Parliament

== Population centres ==
The 1870 electoral redistribution was undertaken by a parliamentary select committee based on population data from the 1867 New Zealand census. Eight sub-committees were formed, with two members each making decisions for their own province; thus members set their own electorate boundaries. The number of electorates was increased from 61 to 72, and Totara was one of the new electorates.

The Totara electorate covered the West Coast south of, but not including, Hokitika. Settlements included Ross, Hari Hari, Whataroa, and Haast. The southern boundary of the electorate met the Tasman Sea at Awarua Point. In the 1875 electoral redistribution, the Totara electorate was unaltered. In the 1881 electoral redistribution, the Totara electorate was abolished and replaced with the Hokitika electorate. The boundaries of this new electorate were almost identical but for the adjustment at the northern end, which brought the town of Hokitika into the new electorate.

== History ==
The first representative was George Henry Tribe, who was the successful candidate in the 1871 election. Tribe died on 19 March 1877 while in office. He was succeeded in a 1877 by-election by William Gisborne. He was re-elected in the 1879 election and at the end of the parliamentary term in 1881, when the Totara electorate was abolished, Gisborne retired from Parliament to return to England following the death of his brother.

=== Election results ===
The electorate was represented by two Members of Parliament:

Key

Independent

Election	Winner
1871 election	George Tribe
1876 election	George Tribe
1877 by-election	William Gisborne
1879 election	William Gisborne
(Electorate abolished 1881; see Hokitika)
