= George Henry Tribe =

New Zealand politician (1828–1877)

New Zealand Parliament
Years	Term	Electorate	Party
1871–1875	5th	Totara	Independent
1876–1877	6th	Totara	Independent

George Henry Tribe (1828 – 19 March 1877) was a Member of Parliament from the Westland District of New Zealand. While living in Christchurch, he bought its first evening newspaper, The Evening Mail. After it failed, he moved to the West Coast. He represented the Totara electorate from 1871 to 1877, when he died.
