= Jack Nagel (political scientist) =

Jack Henry Nagel (born c. 1944) is a political scientist and an emeritus professor at the University of Pennsylvania. His focus is on political participation and democratic theory, principally in anglophone political systems. In addition to his position at the University of Pennsylvania, he is also a visitor at the University of Essex, and a Fulbright Scholar at the New Zealand University of Canterbury, and held the presidency of the Penn Association of Senior and Emeritus Faculty for the academic year 2014–15.

Nagel is an editorial board member of British Journal of Political Science (for which he has also written papers), and Political Science.
