= Hokitika (electorate) =

Former New Zealand parliamentary electorate

Hokitika is a former parliamentary electorate in the West Coast region of New Zealand, based on the town of Hokitika. It existed from 1871 to 1890 and was represented by nine members of parliament. For a time, it was one of the two-member electorates in New Zealand.

== History ==
The Hokitika electorate existed from the 1871 general election to 1890. John White was its first representative until the end of the parliamentary term in 1875, when he retired.

Beginning with the 1875–1876 general election, which was held in Hokitika on 14 January 1876, the electorate was represented by two members. Edmund Barff and Charles Button were elected, Robert Reid and Richard Seddon (the later Premier) were defeated, and Conrad Hoos withdrew just before the election. Barff served the whole term until 1879, while Button resigned in May 1878 and was succeeded by Seymour Thorne George in an 1878 by-election, and who a year later successfully stood in the Rodney electorate.

Robert Reid and Richard Seddon were elected in the 1879 general election. Seddon, who was later Premier ("King Dick"), was in 1881 elected for Kumara. Reid contested the 1881 general election against Gerard George Fitzgerald, with the latter being successful.

John Bevan won the 1884 general election, and he was succeeded in the 1887 election by Joseph Grimmond. In 1890, the Hokitika electorate was abolished. Grimmond stood in the Westland electorate instead, but was defeated by Richard Seddon.

== Members of parliament ==
Hokitika was represented by nine members of parliament.

=== 1871 to 1875 ===
From 1871 to 1875, Hokitika was a single-member electorate. It was represented by one Member of Parliament.

Election	Winner
1871 election	John White

=== 1876 to 1881 ===
From 1876 to 1881, Hokitika was a two-member electorate. It was represented by five Members of Parliament.

Election	Winners	
1876 election	Edmund Barff	Charles Button
1878 by-election	Edmund Barff	Seymour Thorne George
1879 election	Robert Reid	Richard Seddon

=== 1881 to 1890 ===
From 1881 to 1890, Hokitika was again a single-member electorate, represented by three Members of Parliament.

Election	Winner
1881 election	Gerard George Fitzgerald
1884 election	John Bevan
1887 election	Joseph Grimmond

== Election results ==
=== 1887 election ===
1887 general election: Hokitika
Party	Candidate	Votes	%	±%
Independent	Joseph Grimmond	830	57.64	
Independent	John Bevan	610	42.36	−6.60
Majority		220	15.28	+11.13
Turnout		1,440	70.38	+1.12
Registered electors		2,046		

=== 1884 election ===
1884 general election: Hokitika
Party	Candidate	Votes	%	±%
Independent	John Bevan	684	48.96	
Independent	Gerard George Fitzgerald	626	44.81	−11.63
Independent	James Clarke	87	6.23	
Majority		58	4.15	−8.73
Turnout		1,397	69.26	−2.38
Registered electors		2,017		

=== 1881 election ===
1881 general election: Hokitika
Party	Candidate	Votes	%	±%
Independent	Gerard George Fitzgerald	653	56.44	
Independent	Robert Reid	504	43.56	
Majority		149	12.88	+4.25
Turnout		1,157	71.64	
Registered electors		1,615		

=== 1879 election ===
1879 general election: Hokitika
Party	Candidate	Votes	%	±%
Independent	Robert Reid	917	33.09	
Independent	Richard Seddon	800	28.87	
Independent	Peter Dungan	561	20.25	
Independent	Edmund Barff	403	14.54	
Independent	Hamilton Cuming	90	3.25	
Majority		239 (Note: As two members were elected, majority is the difference between the second and third candidate)	8.63	
Turnout		2,771		
Registered electors		1,823 (Note: Electors had two votes each)		

=== 1878 by-election ===
1878 Hokitika by-election
Party	Candidate	Votes	%	±%
Independent	Seymour Thorne George	884	52.84	
Independent	Gerard George Fitzgerald	789	47.16	
Majority		95	5.68	
Turnout		1,673	91.77	
Registered electors		1,823		

=== 1876 election ===
1876 general election: Hokitika
Party	Candidate	Votes	%	±%
Independent	Edmund Barff	648	30.71	
Independent	Charles Button	586	27.77	
Independent	Robert Reid	527	24.98	
Independent	Richard Seddon	343	16.26	
Independent	Conrad Hoos	6	0.28	
Majority		59 (Note: As two members were elected, majority is the difference between the second and third candidate)		
Registered electors		1,547 (Note: Electors had two votes each)		
