= Edmund Barff =

New Zealand politician

Member of the New Zealand Parliament for Westland South
- In office 6 April 1868 – 30 December 1870

Member of the New Zealand Parliament for Hokitika
- In office 14 January 1876 – 15 August 1879
- Preceded by: John White
- Succeeded by: Robert Reid<>Richard Seddon

Personal details
- Born: 5 March 1833 Kent, England
- Died: 29 June 1882 (aged 49) Kumara, New Zealand

Edmund Barff (5 March 1833 – 29 June 1882) was a 19th-century Member of Parliament from the West Coast, New Zealand.

Barff was born in the English county of Kent on 5 March 1833, probably at Lee (now part of Greater London), where he was baptised five months later. He first came to New Zealand to join the West Coast gold rush in the mid-1860s. The West Coast was initially part of the Canterbury Province and following a requisition in October 1865, he was first elected as the member of the West Coast Goldfields electorate in the following month. Barff and Evan Prosser, who was elected at the same time, were the first members from the West Coast on the Canterbury Provincial Council. In July 1866, Barff became a member for the Westland electorate. He remained a member of the Canterbury Provincial Council until December 1867. The Westland district separated from the Canterbury Province on 1 January 1868, and Barff joined the Westland County, which was the predecessor to Westland Province. During the existence of Westland County (January 1868 – November 1873), Barff represented the ridings of Westland, Ōkārito, and Arahura. He did not join the Westland Provincial Council, but stood for the first election in January 1874 as one of three candidates in the two-member Arahura electorate (incorrectly referred to as 'Waimea' in some sources). Much to his surprise, he was defeated with 120 votes by Richard Seddon and Houlahan, who were equal at 145 votes.

New Zealand Parliament
Years	Term	Electorate	Party
1868–1870	4th	Westland South	Independent
1876–1879	6th	Hokitika	Independent

He represented the Westland South electorate in the House of Representatives from 1868 to 1870, when he was defeated for Hokitika by John White. He then represented the Hokitika electorate from 1876 to 1879, when he was again defeated.

Barff died in Kumara in 1882; he had never married.

== Notes ==
New Zealand Parliament
New constituency	Member of Parliament for Westland South; 1868–1870	Constituency abolished
Preceded by John White	Member of Parliament for Hokitika; 1876–1879; Served alongside: Charles Button; Seymour Thorne George	Succeeded by Robert Reid; Richard Seddon
