= Richard Seddon =

Prime minister of New Zealand from 1893 to 1906

The Right Honourable Richard John Seddon
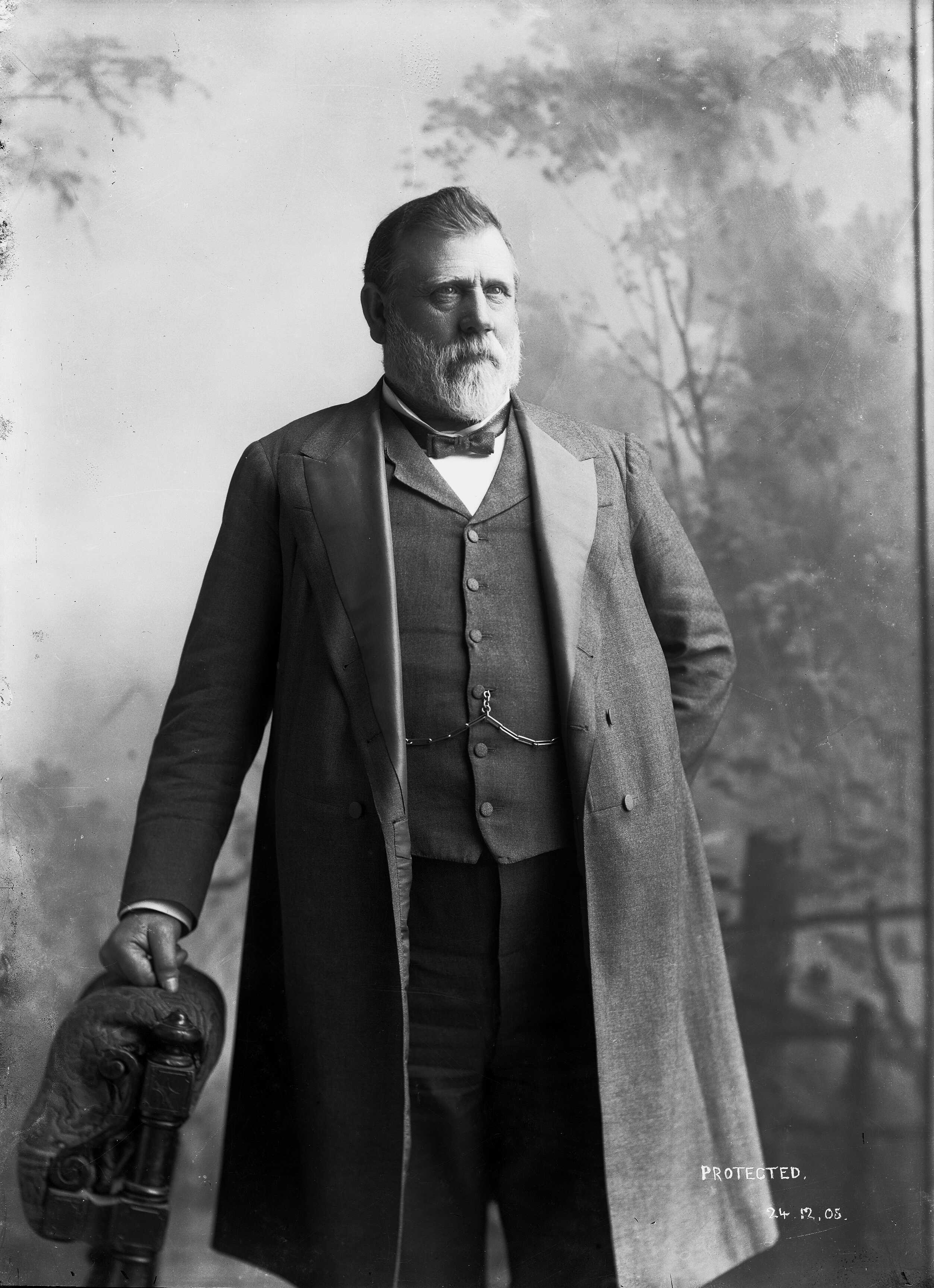
- Seddon in 1905

15th Prime Minister of New Zealand (Note: The title "Prime Minister" was used by Richard Seddon from 1900.)
- In office 27 April 1893 – 10 June 1906
- Monarchs: Victoria; Edward VII
- Governor: David Boyle; Uchter Knox; William Plunket
- Preceded by: John Ballance
- Succeeded by: William Hall-Jones

8th Minister of Defence
- In office 23 January 1900 – 10 June 1906
- Prime Minister: Himself
- Preceded by: Thomas Thompson
- Succeeded by: Albert Pitt
- In office 24 January 1891 – 22 June 1896
- Prime Minister: John Ballance
- Preceded by: William Russell
- Succeeded by: Thomas Thompson

11th Minister of Public Works
- In office 24 January 1891 – 2 March 1896
- Prime Minister: John Ballance
- Preceded by: Thomas Fergus
- Succeeded by: William Hall-Jones

7th Minister of Mines
- In office 24 January 1891 – 6 September 1893
- Prime Minister: John Ballance
- Preceded by: Thomas Fergus
- Succeeded by: Alfred Cadman

Member of the New Zealand Parliament for Westland
- In office 5 December 1890 – 10 June 1906
- Preceded by: Electorate created
- Succeeded by: Tom Seddon

Member of the New Zealand Parliament for Kumara
- In office 9 December 1881 – 5 December 1890
- Preceded by: Electorate created
- Succeeded by: Electorate abolished

Member of the New Zealand Parliament for Hokitika
- In office 5 September 1879 – 9 December 1881
- Preceded by: Multi-member electorate
- Succeeded by: Gerard George Fitzgerald

Personal details
- Born: 22 June 1845 Eccleston, Lancashire, England
- Died: 10 June 1906 (aged 60) Tasman Sea
- Resting place: Bolton Street Memorial Park
- Party: Independent (1879–91); Liberal (1891–1906)
- Spouse: Louisa Spotswood (m. 1869)
- Children: 11, including Tom Seddon and Elizabeth Gilmer

Richard John Seddon (22 June 1845 – 10 June 1906) was a New Zealand politician who served as the 15th premier (prime minister) of New Zealand from 1893 until his death in 1906. In office for thirteen years, he is to date New Zealand's longest-serving head of government.

Seddon was born in Eccleston, Lancashire, England. He arrived in New Zealand in 1866 and settled on the West Coast of the South Island, where he lived for the rest of his life. His prominence in local politics gained him a seat in the House of Representatives in 1879 for Hokitika. Seddon became a key member of the Liberal Party under the leadership of John Ballance. When the Liberal Government came to power in 1891 Seddon was appointed to several portfolios, including Minister of Public Works. Seddon succeeded to the leadership of the Liberal Party following Ballance's death in 1893, inheriting a bill for women's suffrage, which was passed the same year despite Seddon's opposition to it. Seddon's government achieved many social and economic changes, such as the introduction of old age pensions. His personal popularity, charisma and strength overcame dissent from within his cabinet. This has been described as firmly establishing "Seddonism", a colloquial term for Seddon's strand of nationalist conservatism, as New Zealand's dominant political ideology.

Seddon's Liberal government also purchased vast amounts of land from Māori, aided by his allies Alfred Cadman and James Carroll as the Ministers of Native Affairs. He spent the 1899 general election trying to relieve New Zealand's parliament of the independent politicians who had so greatly dominated the country's organised national politics since its provenance, in which he triumphed greatly. An imperialist in foreign policy, his attempt to incorporate Fiji into New Zealand failed, but he successfully annexed the Cook Islands in 1901. Seddon's government supported Britain with troops in the Second Boer War (1899–1902) and supported preferential trade between British colonies.

Seddon was regarded as deeply regionalist and cronyist, being biased towards his adopted region of the West Coast. He inspired serious and long-lasting loyalty among his cabinet members. Seddon led his party to win five consecutive elections, the most for any New Zealand party. Leading the Liberal Party until his death, the party afterwards struggled to recover. Despite being derisively known as "King Dick" for his autocratic style, he has nonetheless been named as one of the greatest prime ministers in New Zealand history.

== Early life and family ==
Seddon was born in the town of Eccleston, near St Helens in Lancashire, England, on 22 June 1845. His father Thomas Seddon (born 1817) was a school headmaster, and his mother Jane Lindsay was a teacher; they married on 8 February 1842 at Christ Church, Eccleston. Richard was the third of their eight children.

Despite this background, Seddon did not perform well at school, and was described as unruly. Despite his parents' attempt to give him a classical education, Seddon developed an interest in engineering, but was removed from school at age 12. After working on his grandfather Richard's farm at Barrow Nook Hall for two years, Seddon was an apprentice at Daglish's Foundry in Sutton. He later worked at Vauxhall foundry in Liverpool, where he attained a Board of Trade Certificate as a mechanical engineer. During his time in Lancashire, he was heavily influenced by social liberalism, and many of its ideas would form part of his political philosophy as a politician.

On 15 June 1862, at the age of 16, Seddon decided to emigrate to Australia, working his passage to Melbourne on the SS Great Britain. He later provided his reasoning: "A restlessness to get away to see new, broad lands seized me: My work was irksome. I felt cramped." He entered the railway workshops at Williamstown, and also worked in the goldfields at Bendigo; he did not meet with any great success. In either 1865 or 1866, he became engaged to Louisa Jane Spotswood, but her family would not permit marriage until Seddon was financially secure.

Seddon moved to New Zealand's West Coast in 1866. Initially, he worked the goldfields in Waimea. He is believed to have prospered here, and he returned briefly to Melbourne to marry Louisa. He established a store, and then expanded his business to include the sale of alcohol, becoming a publican. He was followed to the West Coast by his older sister Phoebe, younger brothers Edward and Jim and younger sister Mary. Phoebe married William Cunliffe on 9 May 1863 at Holy Trinity Church Eccleston. Their son Bill was Labour MP David Cunliffe's grandfather, making Richard Seddon David Cunliffe's great-great-uncle.

== Local politics ==
Seddon first entered politics in 1870, when he ran unsuccessfully for the Westland County Council, finishing third. The same year, he was elected to the Arahura Road Board. He ran again for the County Council in 1872, finishing a distant third.

In 1874 Seddon stood for the newly created Westland Provincial Council and was elected for Arahura. He established himself as a broadly effective, if rather bellicose, advocate for miners' interests. He also took an interest in education during this time. He lost this position with the abolition of the provinces in 1876, and was elected instead to the newly reconstituted county council. In 1876 he stood for Parliament in the two-member Hokitika electorate and placed fourth out of five candidates.

In 1877, Seddon was elected as the first Mayor of Kumara, a goldmining town which had recently rose to prominence. He had staked a claim in Kumara the previous year, and had shortly afterwards moved his business there. Despite occasional financial troubles (he filed for bankruptcy in 1878), his political career prospered.

== Entry to Parliament ==
In the 1879 election, he stood for Parliament again, and was elected. He represented Hokitika to 1881, then Kumara from 1881 to 1890, then Westland from 1890 to his death in 1906. His son Tom Seddon succeeded him as MP for Westland.

In Parliament, Seddon aligned himself with George Grey, a former Governor turned Premier. Seddon later claimed to be particularly close to Grey, although some historians believe that this was an invention for political purposes. Initially, Seddon was derided by many members of Parliament, who mocked his "provincial" accent (which tended to drop the letter "h") and his lack of formal education. He nevertheless proved quite effective in Parliament, being particularly good at "stonewalling" certain legislation. His political focus was on issues of concern to his West Coast constituents. He specialised on mining issues, became a recognised authority on the topic, and chaired the goldfields committee in 1887 and 1888.

He aggressively proclaimed a populist anti-elitist philosophy in many speeches and toast. "It is the rich and the poor; it is the wealthy people and the landowners against the middle classes and the labouring classes," he explained.

New Zealand Parliament
Years	Term	Electorate	Party
1879–1881	7th	Hokitika	Independent
1881–1884	8th	Kumara	Independent
1884–1887	9th	Kumara	Independent
1887–1890	10th	Kumara	Independent
1890–1893	11th	Westland	Liberal
1893–1896	12th	Westland	Liberal
1896–1899	13th	Westland	Liberal
1899–1902	14th	Westland	Liberal
1902–1905	15th	Westland	Liberal
1905–1906	16th	Westland	Liberal

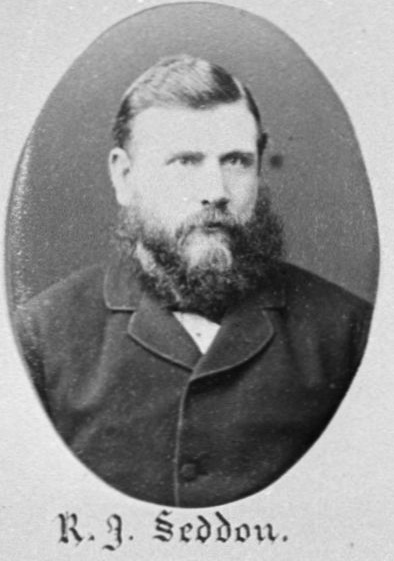
Portrait of Richard Seddon in 1882, from a portrait of the 8th New Zealand Parliament

== Liberal Party ==
Seddon joined the nascent Liberal Party, led by John Ballance, following the December 1890 general election. Their platform was for reform in the areas of land and labour. They were greatly helped by the abolition of plural voting, which allowed landowners in each district they owned land in to vote in them.

Seddon was sworn into his first ministerial positions when the Liberals came to power in January 1891. He became minister of public works, mines, defence, and marine. He promoted co-operative contract system for road-making and other public works projects.

Unlike Ballance who believed in classical liberalism, Seddon did not have any great commitment to any ideology. Rather, he saw the Liberals as champions of "the common man" against large commercial interests and major landowners. His strong advocacy for what he saw as the interests of ordinary New Zealanders won him considerable popularity. Attacks by the opposition, which generally focused on his lack of education and sophistication (one opponent said that he was only "partially civilised") reinforced his growing reputation as an enemy of elitism.

Seddon quickly became popular across the country. Some of his colleagues, however, were not as happy, accusing him of putting populism ahead of principle, and of being an anti-intellectual. John Ballance, now Premier, had a deep commitment to liberal causes such as women's suffrage and Māori rights, which Seddon was not always as enthusiastic about. Nevertheless, many people in the Liberal Party believed that Seddon's popularity was a huge asset for the party, and Seddon developed a substantial following.

== Premiership ==
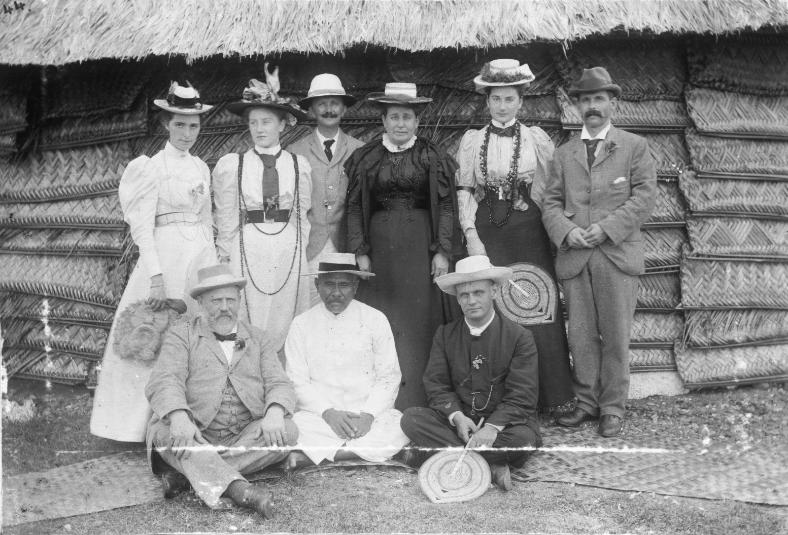
Richard John Seddon and party in Samoa, 1897

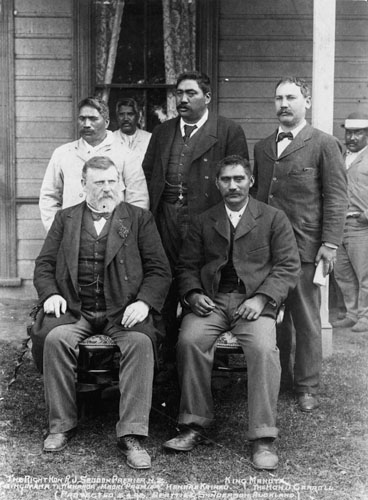
James Carroll (second row, far right). Front row from left: Richard Seddon, Mahuta Tāwhiao, Māori King. Second row from left: Tupu Taingakawa Te Waharoa, Māori Kingmaker; Henare Kaihau, MP. Taken at Huntly, New Zealand in 1898

Ballance fell seriously ill in 1892 and made Seddon acting leader of the House. After Ballance's death in April 1893, the Governor David Boyle, 7th Earl of Glasgow asked Seddon, as the acting leader of the house, to form a new ministry. Despite the refusal of William Pember Reeves and Thomas Mackenzie to accept his leadership, Seddon managed to secure the backing of his Liberal Party colleagues as interim leader, with an understanding being reached that a full vote would occur when Parliament resumed sitting. Seddon's most prominent challenger was Robert Stout, a former Premier for two separate terms. Like Ballance, Stout had a strong belief in classical-liberal principles. Ballance himself had preferred Stout as his successor, but had died before being able to secure this aim. Stout was not a member of the House of Representatives at the time of Ballance's death, and only re-entered following the by-election in Inangahua on 8 June 1893.

Despite Seddon's promise, however, there was no vote on the party leadership and therefore the premiership. By convincing his party colleagues that a leadership contest would split the party in two, or at least leave deep divisions, Seddon managed to secure a permanent hold on the leadership. Stout continued to be one of his strongest critics and led the campaign for women's suffrage despite Seddon's opposition. Eventually Stout left the Liberal Party in 1896 and remained in the house as an independent until 1898. In 1899, however, Seddon recommended Stout to the Governor as the next Chief Justice of New Zealand.

=== Women's suffrage ===
John Ballance, founder of the Liberal Party, had been a strong supporter of voting rights for women, declaring his belief in the "absolute equality of the sexes". At the time women's suffrage was closely linked to the temperance movement, which sought prohibition of alcohol. As a former publican and self-styled "Champion of the Common Man" Seddon initially opposed women's suffrage. In July 1893, two months after Seddon became Premier, the second of two major petitions for women's suffrage was presented to the House.

This resulted in considerable debate within the Liberal Party. John Hall, a former conservative premier, moved a Bill to enact women's suffrage. Seddon's opponents within the party, led by Stout (also an advocate of temperance), managed to gather enough support for the Bill to be passed despite Seddon's opposition. When Seddon realised that the passage of the bill was inevitable, he changed his position, claiming to accept the people's will. In actuality, however, he took strong measures to ensure that the Legislative Council would vote down the Bill, as it had done previously. Seddon's tactics in lobbying the council were seen by many as underhand, and two Councillors, despite opposing suffrage, voted in favour of the bill in protest. The Bill was granted Royal Assent in September.

Nonetheless, at the 1893 general election in November, Seddon's Liberal Party managed to increase its majority.

=== Alcohol licensing ===
The debate on women's suffrage exposed deep divisions within the Liberal Party between more doctrinaire liberals, broadly led by Stout, and "popular" liberals, led by Seddon. This division was again highlighted by the debate over alcohol licensing. Seddon moved the radical Alcoholic Liquors Sale Control Bill in 1893 to introduce licensing districts where a majority could vote for continuance (continued liquor licensing in that district) or reduction of licences or no liquor licences at all. Votes were to be taken every three years at general elections and licensing districts were matched to electoral districts.

=== Old-age pensions ===
One of the policies for which Seddon is most remembered is his Old-age Pensions Act of 1898, which established the basis of the welfare state later expanded by Michael Joseph Savage and the Labour Party. Seddon put considerable weight behind the scheme, despite considerable opposition from many quarters. Its successful passage is often seen as a testament to Seddon's political power and influence.

=== Foreign policy ===
In the sphere of foreign policy, Seddon was a notable supporter of the British Empire. After he attended the Colonial Conference in London in 1897, he became known "as one of the pillars of British imperialism", and he was a strong supporter of the Second Boer War and sponsored preferential tariffs for trade with Britain. He is also noted for his support of New Zealand's own "imperial" designs – Seddon believed that New Zealand should play a major role in the Pacific Islands as a "Britain of the South". Seddon's plans focused mainly on establishing New Zealand dominion over Fiji and Samoa. However, his expansionist policies were discouraged by the Imperial Government. Only the Cook Islands came under New Zealand's control during his term in office.

=== Immigration ===
Seddon was firmly opposed Chinese immigration to New Zealand, harbouring an ethnic prejudice against them stemming from his years in the goldfields.

Although Chinese immigrants were invited to New Zealand by the Dunedin Chamber of Commerce, prejudice against them quickly led to calls for restrictions on immigration. Following the example of anti-Chinese poll taxes enacted by California in 1852 and by Australian states in the 1850s, 1860s and 1870s, John Hall's government passed the Chinese Immigration Act 1881. This imposed a £10 tax per Chinese person entering New Zealand, and permitted only one Chinese immigrant for every 10 tons of cargo. Richard Seddon's government increased the tax to £100 per head in 1896 ($20,990 in modern New Zealand dollars), and tightened the other restriction to only one Chinese immigrant for every 200 tons of cargo.

Seddon compared Chinese people to monkeys, and so used the Yellow Peril conspiracy theory to promote racialist politics in New Zealand. In 1879, in his first political speech, Seddon said that New Zealand did not wish her shores "deluged with Asiatic Tartars. I would sooner address white men than these Chinese. You can't talk to them, you can't reason with them. All you can get from them is 'No savvy'."

=== Style of government ===
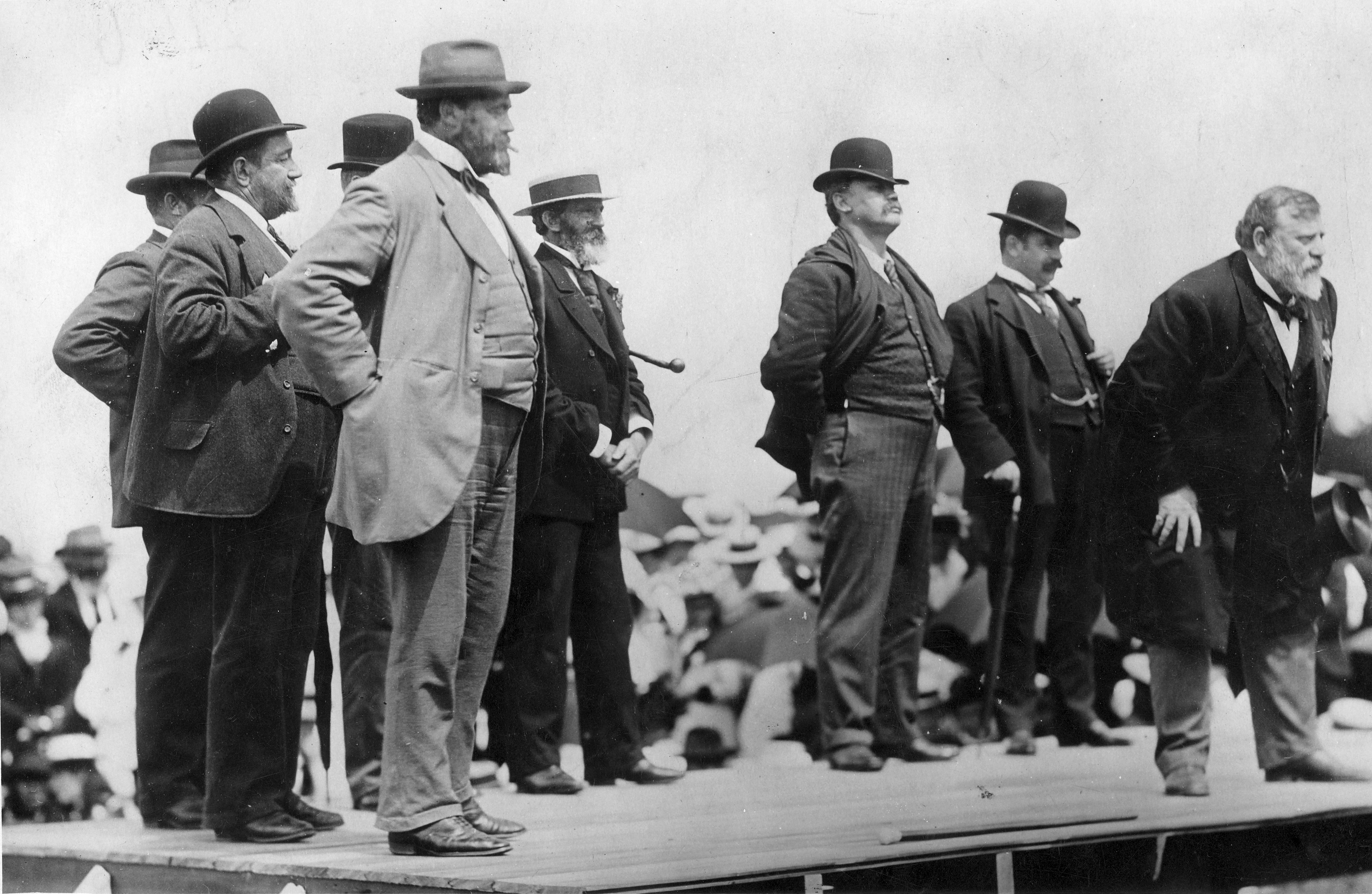
Seddon (far right) addressing a Liberal rally in Greytown, late 1890s

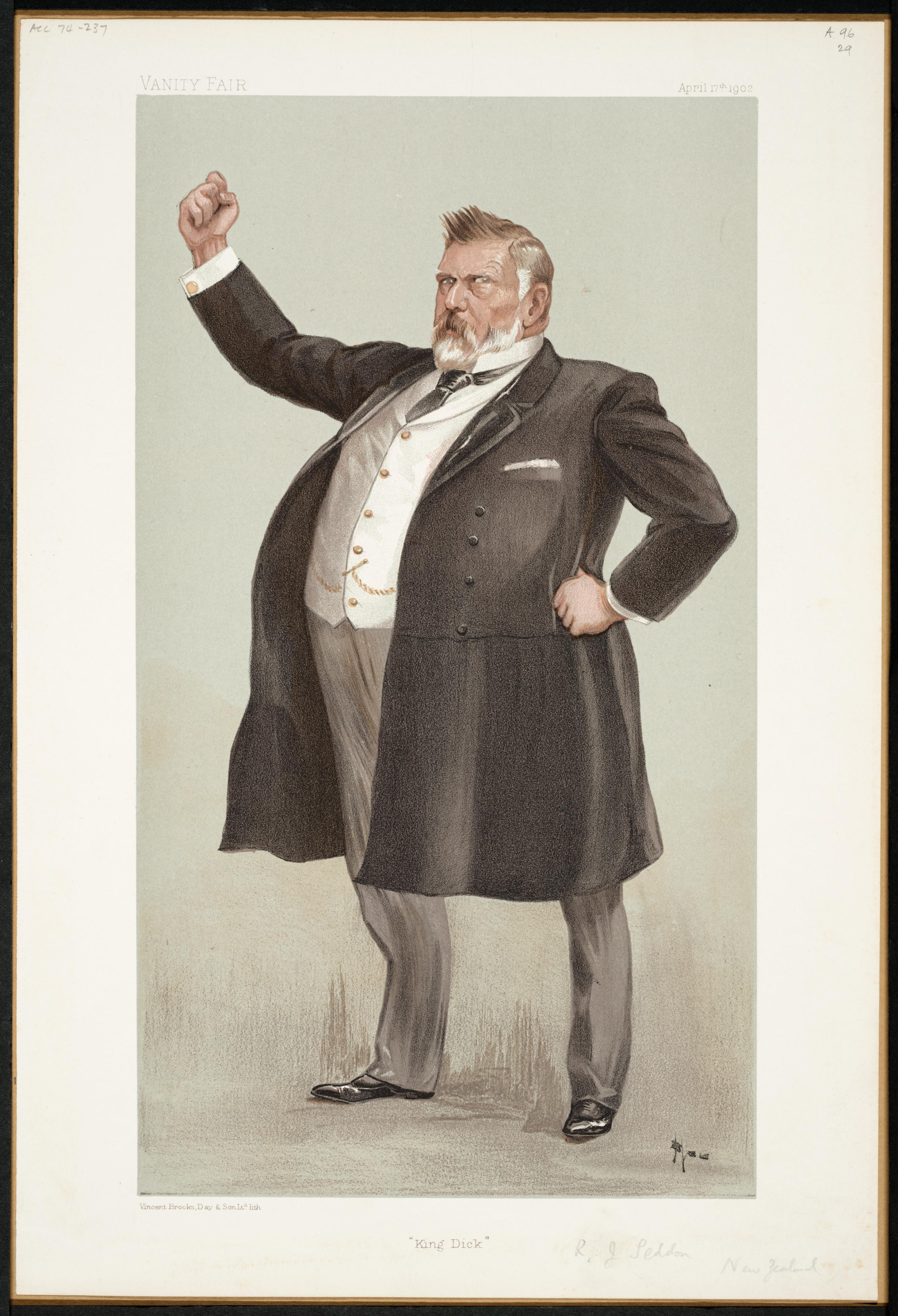
Seddon caricatured by How for Vanity Fair, 1902

Seddon was a strong premier, and enforced his authority with great vigour. At one point, he even commented that "A president is all we require", and that Cabinet could be abolished. His opponents, both within the Liberal Party and in opposition, accused him of being an autocrat – the label "King Dick" was first applied to him at this point.

Seddon accumulated a large number of portfolios for himself, including that of Minister of Finance (from which he displaced Joseph Ward), Minister of Labour (from which he displaced William Pember Reeves), Minister of Education, Minister of Defence, Minister of Native Affairs, and Minister of Immigration.

Seddon was also accused of cronyism – his friends and allies, particularly those from the West Coast, were given various political positions, while his enemies within the Liberal Party were frequently denied important office. Many of Seddon's appointees were not qualified for the positions that they received – Seddon valued loyalty above ability. One account, possibly apocryphal, claims that he installed an ally as a senior civil servant despite the man being illiterate. He was also accused of nepotism – in 1905, it was claimed that one of his sons had received an unauthorised payment, but this claim was proved false.

Sir Carl Berendsen recalled seeing Seddon in 1906 as a Department of Education junior innocently bearing what was an unwelcome document. A replacement was needed for a small native school. The inspectors had picked out three outstanding candidates, but Seddon picked out the last on the lengthy list; he had no academic qualifications and had just been released from gaol for embezzlement. When the Premier appointed the gentlemen from gaol, Departmental officials returned the papers and called attention to his criminal record. Berendsen cowered in the corner while with a snarl Seddon grasped his pen and wrote once more in very large letters, "Appoint Mr X". Berendsen noted though that when an Editor was required for the new School Journal, Departmental officials had agreed on the best man, but the Massey Government (which had replaced the Liberal Government) was "quite shameless in devotion to the principle of the loaves and fishes... and the Minister of the day appointed the third choice".

Successive governments had also shown a lack of firmness in dealing with Māori, he said: "The colony, instead of importing Gatling guns with which to fight Maori, should wage war with locomotives"... pushing through roads and railways and compulsorily purchasing "the land on both sides".

== Religion and freemasonry ==
Seddon was an Anglican.

Seddon became a Freemason in 1868 when he was initiated into Pacific Lodge No 1229 (under the United Grand Lodge of England) in Hokitika. The lodge is still extant, but has since relocated to Christchurch. In 1898, while premier, he was elected Grand Master of New Zealand, and served in that role for two years.

== Honours ==
Seddon attended Queen Victoria's Diamond Jubilee and received her Jubilee Medal and an appointment in the Privy Council. In 1902 he attended the coronation of King Edward VII and Queen Alexandra and received his Coronation Medal. During the same visit, he received the Freedom of the Borough of his home-town St Helens during a visit there in July 1902, and the Freedom of the City of Edinburgh and an honorary degree LL.D. from the University of Edinburgh during a visit to the city later the same month. He was also presented with the Honorary Freedom of the Worshipful Company of Tallow Chandlers on 8 August 1902.

He twice refused a knighthood, wanting to be seen as a man of the people.

== Death ==
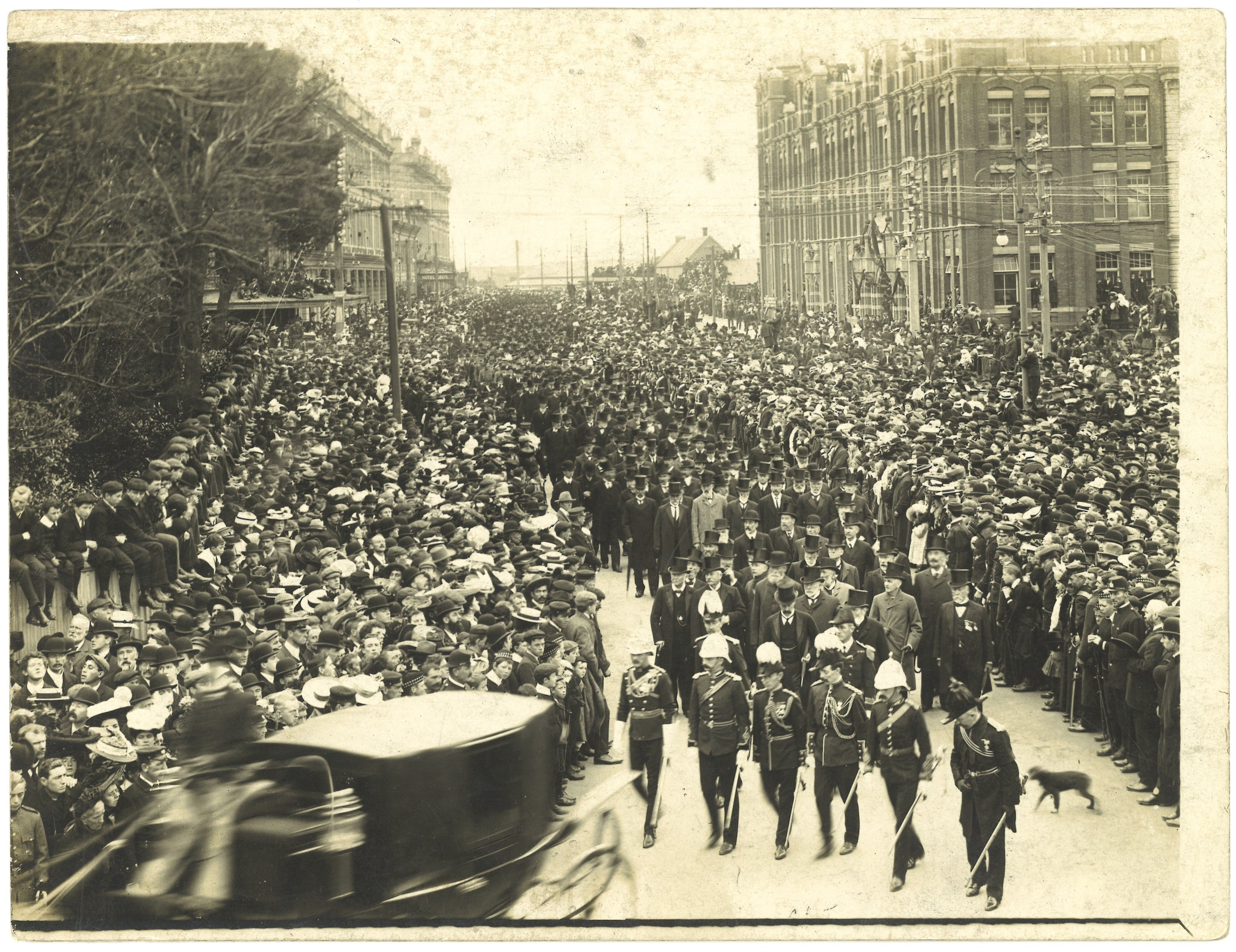
Funeral of Richard 'King Dick' Seddon, 21 June 1906

Seddon remained Prime Minister for 13 years, but gradually, calls for him to retire became more frequent. Various attempts to replace him with Joseph Ward met with failure.

In June 1906, while returning from a trip to Australia on the ship Oswestry Grange, he was sitting with his wife in his cabin waiting to be called to dinner when he suddenly placed his head on his wife's shoulder, and said, "Oh, mother," before expiring of a massive heart attack at 6.20 pm on 10 June. Immediately following his death the ship, which was 110 miles (180 km) from Sydney Heads, turned back to port, its flag at half-mast. He died 12 days before his 61st birthday. On the eve of his departure, he had sent a number of telegrams, among whom was one to the premier of Victoria, Thomas Bent, which contained the words, "Just leaving for God's own country".

News of his death provoked numerous public gestures of grief, which included black-bordered displays in shop windows and several public monuments, including a memorial lamp post outside the St Helens Hospital in Pitt Street Auckland.

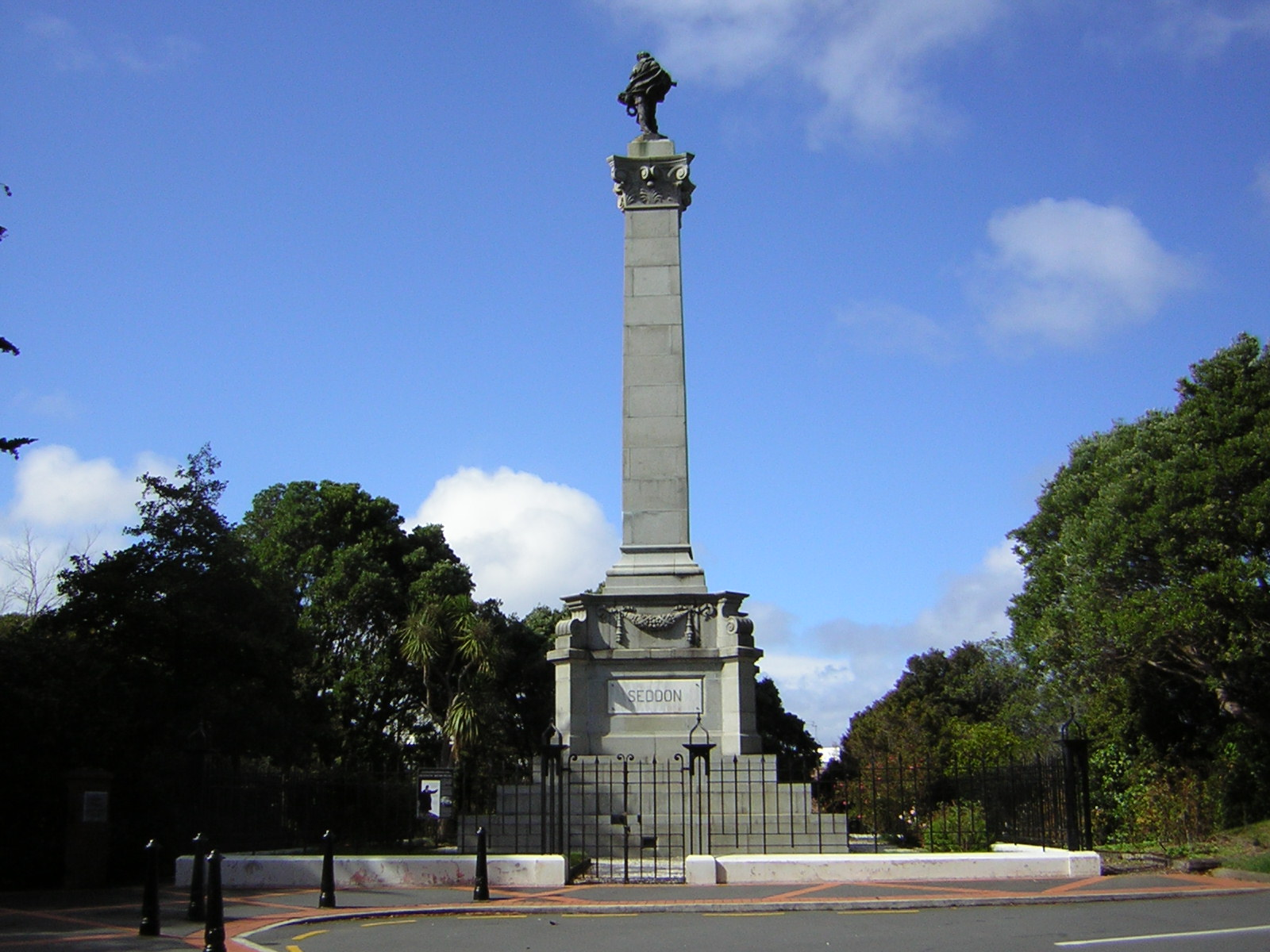
Richard Seddon's grave in Bolton Street Memorial Park, Wellington

Seddon's funeral was held on 21 June 1906 and he was buried in Wellington's Bolton Street Cemetery.

Joseph Ward was away in London at the time of Seddon's death. He succeeded Seddon as Prime Minister nearly two months later, on 6 August 1906.

== Personal life ==
Seddon married Louisa Jane Spotswood on 13 January 1869 in Trinity Church, Williamstown, Victoria, Australia. Lousia was born on 28 May 1851 in Williamstown, Victoria, Australia to Anna Victoria (nee Normandale) and John Stuart Spotswood. After a long illness Louisa died at her home, "Eccleston," in Wellington on 9 July 1931. Flags were flown at half-mast, on various Government buildings on the day of her funeral.

The couple had the following eleven children with nine surviving to adulthood.

- Jane Anne Seddon. Born 8 May 1870 In Waimea, Westland. She died on 20 August 1955.
- Phoebe Alicia Seddon. Born on 26 June 1871. She died on 5 December 1944.
- Louisa Jane Spottswood Seddon. Born on 10 December 1872 in Big Dam, Westland. She died on 12 October 1957.
- Mary Stuart Charleston Seddon. Born on 20 June 1874 in Charlestown, West Coast. She died on 17 April 1946. Interred with her parents.
- Catherine Youd Lindsay Seddon. Born on 17 January 1876 in Kumara. She died on 20 October 1877.
- Catherine Youd Lindsay Seddon. Born on 24 March 1878 in Kumara, West Coast. She died on 2 July 1881.
- Elizabeth May Seddon. Born on 24 March 1880 in Kumara. She died on 29 February 1960.
- Richard John Spotswood Seddon. Born on 29 May 1881 in Kumara. He was killed at Bapaume, France on 21 August 1918 while serving as a captain with the New Zealand Expeditionary Force. Over a ten-year period his mother campaigned without success to have his remains repatriated back to New Zealand. The original wooden cross from Seddon's grave was brought back to New Zealand by one of his sisters and now resides inside the Seddon Memorial.
- Thomas Edward Youd Seddon. Born 2 July 1884 in Kumara. He died 22 January 1972.
- John Stewart Spotswood Seddon. Born on 20 July 1887 in Kumara. He died in 1969.
- Rubi Jessie Seddon. Born on 11 January 1889 in Kumara. She died on 19 December 1956.

== Legacy ==
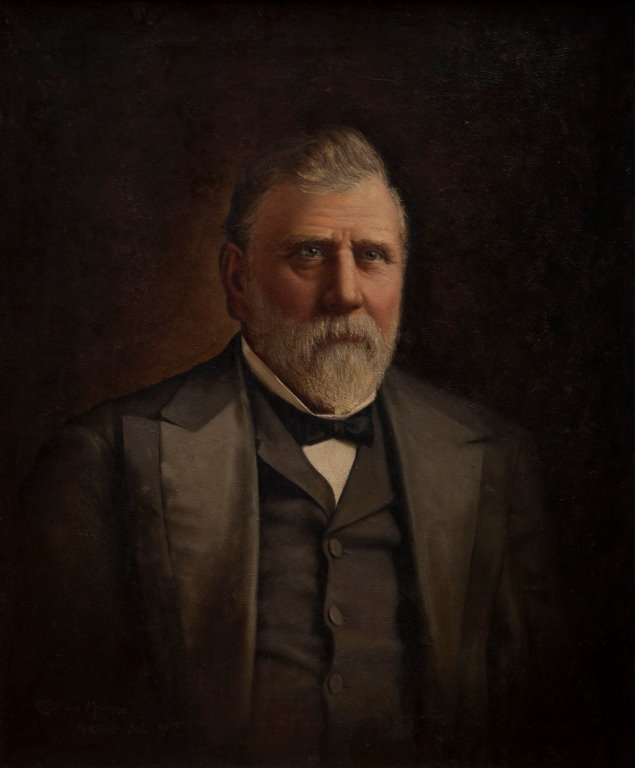
1907 portrait by Ellen von Meyern

He is considered by academics and historians to be one of New Zealand's greatest and most revered prime ministers. Seddon centralised government decision-making around himself—at his peak he exercised "almost one-man, one-party rule"—and, in doing so, he established the premiership as the de facto most important political office in New Zealand.

Seddon's son Thomas replaced him as MP for Westland in the by-election following his death. When Thomas met former US President Theodore Roosevelt in 1918, he expressed admiration for his late father, particularly the labour legislation his government passed.

A town in New Zealand and a suburb of Melbourne, Australia, are named after him. Wellington Zoo was originally created when a young lion was presented to Prime Minister Richard Seddon by the Bostock and Wombwell Circus. Seddon created the Zoo from this single specimen and the lion was later named King Dick in the Prime Minister's honour. The stuffed body of King Dick (the lion) is displayed on the ground floor of the Museum of Wellington City & Sea. St Mary's Church in Addington, Christchurch also has a memorial bell tower to Richard Seddon.

The Duke of Argyll unveiled a memorial to Seddon in St Paul's Cathedral, London, in 1910. It shows a portrait of Seddon with the inscription " To the memory of Richard John Seddon prime minister of New Zealand 1893–1906 imperialist statesman reformer born June 22nd 1845 at St Helens Lancashire buried at Observatory Hill Wellington New Zealand"

=== Seddon memorial ===
Following Seddon's death plans were put in place to erect a suitable memorial which would also incorporate a Seddon family mausoleum. It was quickly agreed that the existing Colonial Time Service Observatory on top of Observatory Hill (today part of Bolton Street Memorial Park) should be torn down to make way for it. A new observatory was later constructed on the site of the former Garden coast defence battery at the top of the Botanic Gardens.

The memorial was designed by government architect John Campbell and constructed by Edwards and Son of Wellington with the above ground portion consisting of reinforced concrete faced with Coromandel granite. It cost £2,746. Constructed between 1908 and 1910 the memorial is topped by a bronze female figure approximately 8 feet (2.4 m) in height and weighing 2 long tons (2,000 kg) symbolising the "Zealandia", the country mourning its dead. Costing approximately £500, the figure was designed at the London studio of sculptor Henry Poole and cast by Alexander Parlanti. The concrete crypt underneath contains the body of Seddon, his wife Louisa, their daughter Mary Stuart Hay and memorial to their son Captain Richard Spotswood Seddon, who was killed in 1918 while serving in France.

The family remains were temporally removed between 2021 and December 2022 when the memorial was restored and seismically strengthened by the installation of a structural steel frame in the crypt and central void, combined with the installation of 17 post-tension tie rods.

=== Statues of Seddon ===
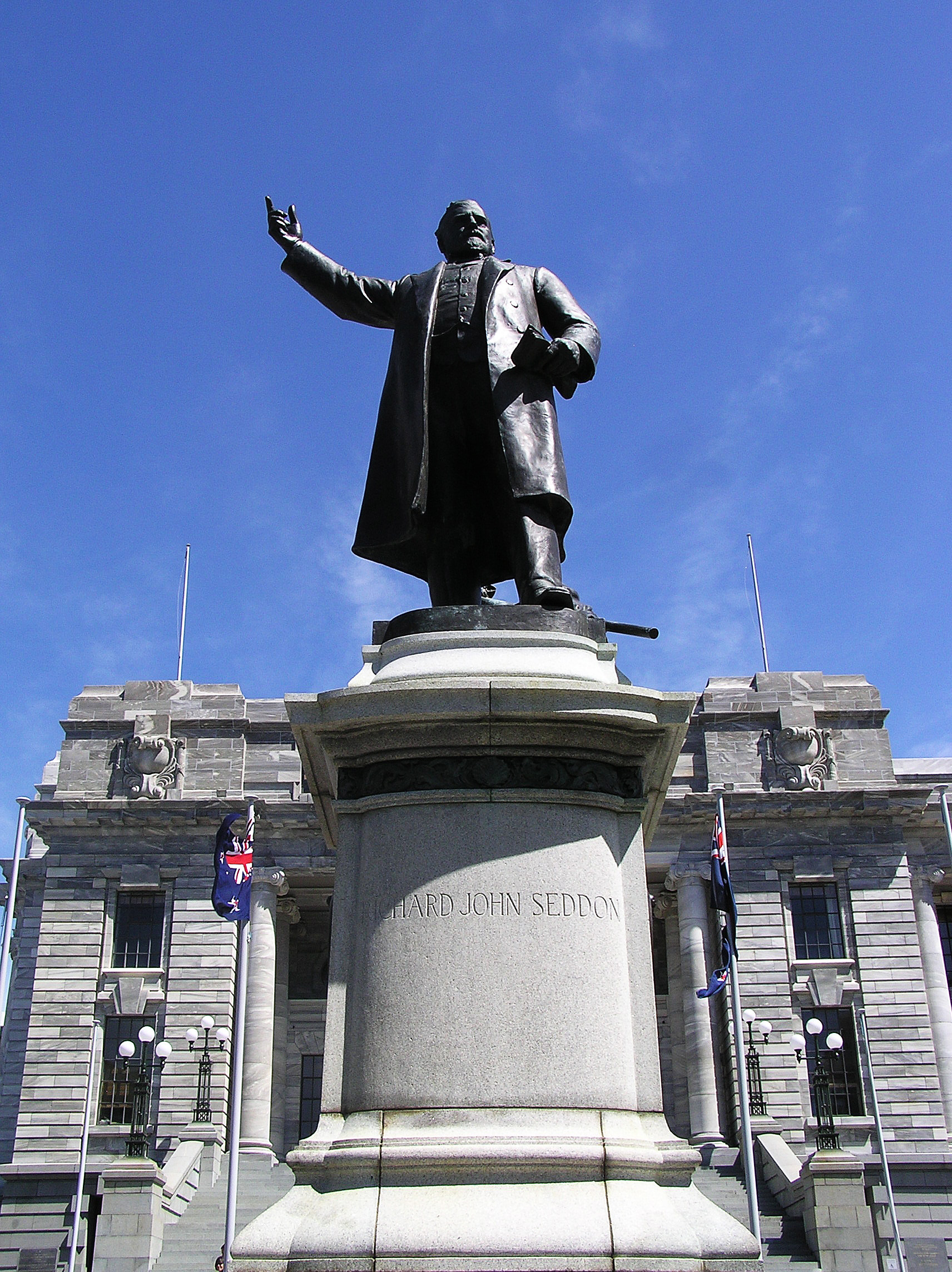
Seddon's statue stands outside Parliament Buildings in Wellington.

A 2.90 metres (9 ft 6 in) high bronze statue on a 4.6 metres (15 ft) pedestal of Aberdeen granite to Seddon was erected facing Molesworth Street in front of the main entrance to Parliament Buildings. It was commissioned by then-Prime Minister Sir Joseph Ward from Sir Thomas Brock. The statue has him wearing a frock coat which was based on the one that he had worn while speaking at Papawai near Greytown. The coat had been brought to Brock in 1905 by Louisa Seddon and her daughter Mary. The statue was paid for by jointly by the government and the public, with its completion delayed by the landscaping of the grounds and the construction of Seddon's memorial. At a public event attended by 1,500 people on 26 June 1915 the statue was unveiled by the Governor-General, Lord Liverpool. Among those attending were members of Seddon's family, the prime minister William Massey, Sir Joseph Ward and Sir John Luke, mayor of Wellington.

Since 11 November 1981 the statue has had a Historic Places category 1 listing.

Another statue of Seddon has a prominent position in the West Coast town of Hokitika.

== Notes and references ==
=== References ===
- Berendsen, Carl (2009). Mr Ambassador: Memoirs of Sir Carl Berendsen. Wellington: Victoria University Press. ISBN 9780864735843.
- Brooking, Tom (2014). Richard Seddon: King of God's Own. Auckland: Penguin. ISBN 9780143569671.
- Burdon, Randal Mathews (1955). King Dick: A Biography of Richard John Seddon. Christchurch: Whitcombe and Tombs.
- Hamer, David A. (1988). The New Zealand Liberals: The Years of Power, 1891–1912. Auckland: Auckland University Press. ISBN 1-86940-014-3. OCLC 18420103.
- Hamer, David A. (2006). "Seddon, Richard John (1845–1906)". Oxford Dictionary of National Biography (online ed.). Christchurch: Oxford University Press. doi:10.1093/ref:odnb/36002. (Subscription, Wikipedia Library access or UK public library membership required.)
- Hamer, David A. (2014). Seddon, Richard John (1845–1906). Wellington: Te Ara: The Encyclopedia of New Zealand.
- Lipson, Leslie (2011) [1948]. The Politics of Equality: New Zealand's Adventures in Democracy. Wellington: Victoria University Press. ISBN 978-0-86473-646-8.
- Nagel, Jack H. (1993). "Populism, Heresthetics and Political Stability: Richard Seddon and the Art of Majority Rule". British Journal of Political Science. 23 (2). Christchurch: 139–174. doi:10.1017/S0007123400009716. ISSN 0007-1234. JSTOR 194246. S2CID 154806794.
- Seddon, Thomas (1968). The Seddons, An Autobiography. Auckland, London: Collins.
- Scott, Dick (1975). Ask That Mountain: The Story of Parihaka. Heinemann.
- Wolfe, Richard (2005). Battlers Bluffers and Bully-boys: How New Zealand's Prime Ministers Have Shaped Our Nation. Random House, New Zealand. ISBN 1-86941-715-1.

Government offices
Preceded by John Ballance	Prime Minister of New Zealand; 1893–1906	Succeeded by William Hall-Jones
Political offices
Preceded by Thomas Fergus	Minister of Mines; 1891–1893	Succeeded by Alfred Cadman
Preceded by Thomas Fergus	Minister of Public Works; 1891–1896	Succeeded by William Hall-Jones
Preceded by William Russell	Minister of Defence; 1891–1896 1900–1906	Succeeded by Thomas Thompson
Preceded by Thomas Thompson	Minister of Defence; 1891–1896 1900–1906	Succeeded by Albert Pitt
Preceded by Joseph Ward	Postmaster-General and Electric Telegraph Commissioner; 1896–1899	Succeeded by Joseph Ward
Preceded by William Campbell Walker	Minister of Education; 1903–1906	Succeeded by William Hall-Jones
Party political offices
Preceded by John Ballance	Leader of the Liberal Party; 1893–1906	Succeeded by William Hall-Jones
New Zealand Parliament
Preceded by Seymour Thorne George; Edmund Barff	Member of Parliament for Hokitika; 1879–1881; Served alongside: Robert Reid	Succeeded by Gerard George Fitzgerald
New constituency	Member of Parliament for Kumara; 1881–1890	Constituency abolished
Vacant Constituency recreated after abolition in 1868 Title last held by William Sefton Moorhouse	Member of Parliament for Westland; 1890–1906	Succeeded by Tom Seddon
