= Robert Reid (New Zealand politician) =

Robert Caldwell Reid

Member of the New Zealand Parliament for Hokitika
- In office 5 September 1879 – 8 November 1881
- Preceded by: Edmund Barff; Seymour Thorne George
- Succeeded by: Gerard George Fitzgerald

Personal details
- Born: 4 February 1839 Wick, Caithness, Scotland
- Died: 18 March 1897 (aged 58) Westport, New Zealand
- Resting place: Middle Orowaiti Cemetery
- Occupation: Newspaper proprietor

Robert Caldwell Reid (4 February 1839 – 18 March 1897) was a 19th-century Member of Parliament from the West Coast, New Zealand. Born in Scotland and attracted by the gold rushes in Victoria and the West Coast, he was later the proprietor of a series of newspapers.

== Early life ==
Reid was born in Wick, Caithness, Scotland, in 1839. His parents were Peter and Mariah Reid (née Caldwell). His family had owned The John O'Groat Journal for two or three generations. Back home, he learned the trade of a banker.

== Professional career ==
Reid emigrated to Victoria, Australia in the early 1850s. From there, he joined the West Coast gold rush as a gold buyer for the Bank of New Zealand near Okarito; experiences which he documented in his book Golden Coast. He speculated with land in the Greymouth area. He then went into business with Mr Loutit, trading under the banner of Loutit and Reid.

Reid was the proprietor of several newspapers. He was a strong supporter of Sir George Grey and when he joined parliament in 1879, he bought the Wellington pro-Grey publication New Zealander, but the newspaper was unprofitable. He had bought the West Coast Times in 1874, which he sold in late 1883 or early 1884. He then joined George McCullagh Reed in business in London, and they published a newspaper, the Anglo-New Zealander, aimed at colonists. That venture failed, and Reid returned to New Zealand, where he owned The Dunedin Herald, the Greymouth Star, and from April 1889 until his death, the Westport News.

== Political career ==
New Zealand Parliament
Years	Term	Electorate	Party
1879–1881	7th	Hokitika	Independent

For six months during 1869 (20 March – 22 September), Reid represented the Buller electorate in the Nelson Provincial Council.

Reid sought election to the House of Representatives in the 1876 election, standing for the Hokitika electorate. In the two-member electorate, he came third out of five candidates; the later Premier Richard Seddon came fourth.

He represented the Hokitika electorate from 1879 to 1881, when he was defeated by Gerard George Fitzgerald.

== Family and death ==
In 1869, he married Emily Manning, the daughter of James Manning of Dunedin. While in London, he had an attack of paralysis, which disabled him for the rest of his life, with much of the running of his newspapers conducted by his wife. He died at Westport on 18 March 1897, and was buried at Middle Orowaiti Cemetery. He was survived by his wife.

== Bibliography ==
- Reid, Robert Caldwell (1884). Golden Coast. Reid & Company.

New Zealand Parliament
Preceded by Seymour Thorne George; Edmund Barff	Member of Parliament for Hokitika; 1879–1881; Served alongside: Richard Seddon	Succeeded by Gerard George Fitzgerald
