= Parliamentary Debates (Hansard) =

New Zealand parliamentary transcripts

Parliamentary Debates (Hansard) is the official name of the transcripts of debates in the New Zealand Parliament. New Zealand was one of the first countries to establish an independent team of Hansard reporters, 42 years before the British (Imperial) Parliament. An official record of debates has been kept continuously since 9 July 1867. Speeches made in the House of Representatives and the Legislative Council between 1867 and the commencement of Parliament in 1854 were compiled in 1885 from earlier newspaper reports, and this compilation also forms part of the New Zealand Hansard record.

The Hansard takes its name from Thomas Curson Hansard, who started publishing a daily record of proceedings in the British Parliament in the early 19th century.

== History ==
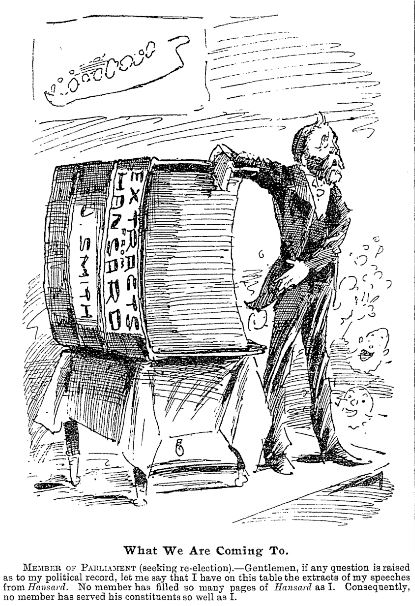
NZ Observer & Free Lance 1895

For 13 years from the establishment of the New Zealand Parliament in Auckland in 1854 newspaper reports were the only record of what MPs said in debates in the Legislative Council and the House of Representatives. The accuracy of these reports often depended on the political leanings of the owners of the newspaper in which they were published, and consistency of reporting was a real problem, as noted in an article in the Wellington Independent newspaper in 1860:

“These reports give you little notion of the reality. Some members … whose speeches are dreary beyond belief, and almost unintelligible as delivered in the House, [become] flowing oratory in the columns of the newspaper. While others… are shorn of their fair proportions, and their speeches reduced to mere notes… Members who usually talk to empty benches [appear] as prominent as those who electrify the gallery or are the life of the House.”

MP William Fitzherbert brought a motion to the House in 1856 calling for funds to be applied to "secure accurate and authentic reports of the substance and arguments of the speeches". Then in 1862 James FitzGerald (MP for Christchurch and owner of The Press) introduced a motion calling on the Government to take steps to secure the publication of "full and accurate reports of the debates in this House". Despite both motions being unanimously agreed, it was not until 1866 that a Select Committee, chaired by FitzGerald, was established to “consider and report as to the best manner in which the debates of the General Assembly can be reported and printed.”

On 9 July 1867 a team of five reporters (AJ Dallas, George McIntyre, James Kinsella, ET Gillon, and William Mitchell who later drowned), led by Chief Reporter C.C.N. Barron, produced the first official report of debates of the New Zealand Parliament. One notable Hansard Reporter from the 1870s and 1880s was George Fisher, who was mayor of Wellington for four terms, member of Parliament for Wellington and Minister of Education and Commissioner of Trade and Customs. Another notable early Hansard Reporter was Charles Melville Crombie, who later became Chief Commissioner of Taxes.

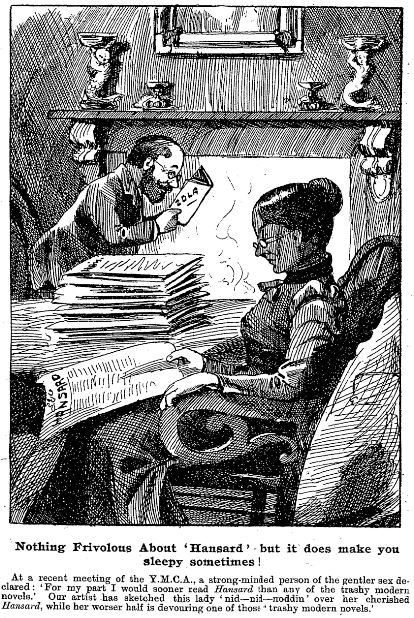
NZ Observer & Free Lance 1894

Reporters worked in 15 minute "turns" and had to cover speeches in both debating chambers, regularly working until after midnight to finish the day's reports, taking notes using Pitman shorthand and then transcribing these by dictation. From the establishment of the Hansard team speeches were reported as fully as possible, although for many years it was regularly proposed that only summaries of speeches should be published. Reporters had to cope with speakers who had a variety of different accents and speaking pace, and had to learn the names of an increasing number of members, with the number of members in the House alone increasing from 37 in 1854 to 95 by 1882. Competent reporters with shorthand skills were scarce in New Zealand and men were brought in during parliamentary sessions from Australian parliaments to assist local reporters.

In 1884 Maurice FitzGerald, son of James FitzGerald, was engaged to compile from newspaper reports speeches made in Parliament between 1854 and 1867. Maurice Fitzgerald completed this work in 1885. He died in 1886 (at 25 years of age) from tuberculosis before all five volumes of his compilation were printed.

== New Zealand Hansard today ==
Official transcripts of MPs' speeches in the House have been continuously published since 1867. Today Hansard is produced by a team of about 17 FTE Hansard editors within the Office of the Clerk of the House of Representatives. Hansard is published on the New Zealand Parliament website each day the House sits, and later indexed bound volumes are produced.

Speeches are transcribed directly from digital recordings of the debate, with staff present in the debating chamber to monitor the debate by recording the sequence of speakers and any interjections. Interjections are reported only if the member speaking replies to them or remarks on them during the course of his or her speech. Hansard Editors follow strict rules on what changes they can make to the words MPs use in the debating chamber. Hansard is as close to verbatim as possible, although Hansard Editors remove repetitions and redundancies and make minor grammatical corrections. MPs are provided draft copies of their speeches at the same time that the speeches are first published on the Parliament website. MPs can request correction of inadvertent factual inaccuracies but they are unable to significantly change what they said in the House.

== Timeline of establishment of Hansard in New Zealand ==
Date	Event or decision relevant to reporting of debates
24 May 1854	The General Assembly sat for the first time, with an upper house, the Legislative Council, consisting of 12 appointed Legislative Councillors, and a House of Representatives consisting of 37 elected Members of the House.
May/June 1854	A "reporting club" of MPs was formed, consisting of James FitzGerald, Henry Sewell, Edward Gibbon Wakefield, Edward Jerningham Wakefield, James Macandrew, Hugh Carleton and William Cutten. Because of the lack of press reporters with shorthand skills this group undertook to take notes of speeches in the House, which would then be provided to each member who had spoken for checking, before being provided to newspapers for publication. The collegiality of members of the reporting club was short-lived: by early July Henry Sewell complained that Edward Gibbon Wakefield "does not scruple here and there to doctor and color what has been really said, not absolutely falsifying, and yet giving slight touches which wholly alter the real character... his speeches are embellished throughout with cheers, as if the House sympathized heartily".
12 June 1856	MPs agreed a motion moved by William Fitzherbert calling for funds to be applied to "secure accurate and authentic reports of the substance and arguments of the speeches made by honorable [sic] members of the House"
25 August 1862	MPs agreed a motion moved by James FitzGerald calling on the Government to take steps to secure the publication of "full and accurate reports of the debates in this House"
2 December 1863	MPs reaffirm the motion moved by James FitzGerald calling on the Government to take steps to secure the publication of "full and accurate reports of the debates in this House"
8 & 14 August 1865	MPs agreed a motion moved by Frederick Weld: "That a Select Committee be appointed to superintend the revision of the reports of debates" A similar motion moved by James Crowe Richmond was passed in the Legislative Council
5 & 17 July 1866	MPs agreed a motion moved by Edward Stafford "That a Select Committee be appointed to consider and report as to the best manner in which the debates of the General Assembly can be reported and printed." This Committee reported to the House that the Government should eventually "engage a staff of competent reporters" but until that could be done the Wellington newspapers should be paid to "furnish full and accurate reports daily of the proceedings in both Houses." However the House refused to agree a resolution moved by Committee Chairman James FitzGerald to enter into a contract with local newspaper proprietors, as had been proposed by the report.
26 July 1866	James FitzGerald drew the House's attention to the fact that newspapers were deliberately omitting to report the speeches, or even the name, of a certain member. A note in Hansard indicates that FitzGerald was referring to the Wellington newspapers purposely omitting any mention of Francis Dillon Bell.
28 September 1866	Thomas MacKenzie, proprietor of the Wellington Independent newspaper was summoned to appear before the House for a "breach of Privilege" by publishing a report of parliamentary debates that indicated that Arthur John Burns (Member for Caversham) had acted maliciously by raising a certain matter in House.
9 July 1867	Clarke Charles Netterville Barron is appointed as Chief Reporter and tasked with establishing a team of reporters to record debates in both Houses of Parliament.
10 July 1867	Colonial Secretary Edward Stafford advised the House that the Government had established "a reporting staff of four persons, and a head of the staff, who will take down and report the proceedings of both Houses, which will be printed". A Select Committee was appointed to "have entire control over the reporting"... this was an "experiment"; the Select "Committee was to ascertain whether the present arrangements could be improved." The Wellington Independent derided the government's decision to establish a team of Hansard reporters, rather than enter into a contract with local newspapers to report on debates.
16 July 1867	The Select Committee on Reporting Debates adopted rules that allowed Members "the opportunity of revising reports, on the strict understanding that the alterations are to be confined to making the reports more in accordance with the remarks actually uttered in the House. The head reporter to be the judge of the alterations made, and to refuse to pass those which he considers are departures from a correct report of what the speaker said."
6 August 1868	After lengthy debate, the House refused to agree a resolution moved by Charles Heaphy that "having in view the burdensome taxation of the country... the present system of reporting the debates, and the expense thereof, should cease with the termination of existing contracts."
1 September 1869	A Reporting Debates Committee appointed by the House on 4 June 1869 "for the purpose of regulating the proceedings of the reporters, and endeavouring to provide for the better compilation of the reports" reaffirmed the rule established by the 1867 Select Committee on Reporting Debates that if Members seek to make material alterations in the reports of their speeches the 'Chief Reporter should have the power to refuse to pass such corrections to the Printer".
14 July 1870	The Reporting Debates Committee considered, but did not agree to, a proposal by John Davies Ormond (Member for Clive) that "Hansard staff should be required to prepare summaries of the debates in the House for transmission by telegraph to the various newspapers of the colony".
14 November 1871	MPs agreed a motion moved by William Harrison: "That, with the view to improving the character of Hansard, a permanent staff of efficient reporters should be engaged for that service," (at that time most reporters were employed on a sessional basis) "and that it should be a primary duty of the Chief Reporter to take his share in the task of reporting." (The chief reporter was currently mostly doing administration and checking reports, rather than reporting.)
24 September & 25 October 1872	MPs noted a marked improvement in Hansard due to the appointment of permanent reporters
28 July 1875	After lengthy debate, the House refused to agree a proposal from the Reporting Debates Committee that "Hansard reporters be directed to report "short" those debates which are not of general public interest." This proposal would have seen many speeches reported in a précis format, with only "matters of political importance... reported as nearly as possible in extenso".
8 August 1879	MPs again rejected a proposal brought by the Reporting Debates and Printing Committee that would have allowed the Chief Reporter "the exercise of a discretionary power as to reporting matters arising incidentally in the House, and not set down as business of the day [because] with the limited staff at his disposal, it was impossible... to report everything that took place in the House".
3 December 1879	MPs again rejected a proposal brought by the Reporting Debates committees of both houses "that the debates published in Hansard shall be condensed next session".
7 July 1880	MPs agreed a motion "that it be an instruction to the Printing and Debates Committee to inquire into and report to this House in what manner retrenchment can best be effected in the cost of the publication of Hansard."
15 June 1882	MPs rejected a motion "that members shall defray the cost of printing their own speeches in Hansard; and that such cost shall be deducted from the honorarium, if any, to which they may be entitled". (If it had been passed this motion would have allowed members to choose whether or not their speeches were reported in Hansard.)".
7 November 1884	William Steward advised the House that the Reporting Debates and Printing Committee had sanctioned the ordering of four 'Caligraph' typewriters as a trial "with a view to adding to the facilities of the reporting staff".
8 November 1884	Premier Robert Stout advised the House that Maurice FitzGerald, son of James FitzGerald, would be engaged to compile from newspaper reports speeches made in Parliament between 1854 and 1867. This work was completed the following year but the last of the five volume compilation was not printed until 1887.

== Volumes ==
Hansard has been digitized by Google in partnership with the University of California (Santa Cruz et al. libraries), from the first sitting of the House in May 1854 up to July 1987. These digital volumes are hosted by HathiTrust and are available via the links in the first column of the table below. The entire collection up to July 1987 is searchable using the HathiTrust website. The last column of the table below has links to other digital volumes created in partnership with university libraries if these are publicly available via HathiTrust.

Hansard from 16 September 1987 to 17 December 2002 created from word processing files (i.e., not the official printed volumes) is available via the links in the first column of the table below and the 123 volumes in this period can be downloaded here (this is useful for searching across the collection).

Hansard from 11 February 2003 onwards is available from the NZ Parliament website. The period 11 February 2003 to 9 June 2016 is also available via the links in the first column of the table below and the 109 volumes in this period can be downloaded here.

Volume No. (external links)	Period covered	Sessions covered	Other digitisations
A^{1}	24 May 1854 – 15 September 1855	1st Parliament: 1st, 2nd & 3rd sessions	1854–55^{9} 1854–55^{11} 1854–55^{12}
B^{1}	15 April 1856 – 8 July 1858	2nd Parliament: 1st & 2nd sessions	1856–58^{9} parl.2 (1856–58)^{10} 1856–58^{11} 1856–58:1^{12}
C^{1}	9 July 1858 – 5 November 1860	2nd Parliament: 2nd & 3rd sessions	parl.2 (1858–60)^{10} 1858–60^{11} 1858:2–60^{12}
D^{1}	3 June 1861 – 14 December 1863	3rd Parliament: 1st, 2nd & 3rd sessions	parl.3 (1861–63)^{10} 1861–63^{11}
E^{1}	24 November 1864 – 8 October 1866	3rd Parliament: 4th & 5th sessions 4th Parliament: 1st session	parl.3–4 (1864–66)^{10} 1864–66^{11} v.E^{12}
1.1^{2}	9 July 1867 – 29 August 1867	4th Parliament: 2nd session	parl.4:sess.2(1867:Jul.9-Aug.29)^{10} 1867^{11} v.1.1^{12}
1.2^{3}	30 August 1867 – 10 October 1867	4th Parliament: 2nd session	
2	9 July 1868 – 21 August 1868	4th Parliament: 3rd session	parl.4:sess.3(1868:Jul.9-Aug.21)^{10} 1868:1^{11}
3	25 August 1868 – 24 September 1868	4th Parliament: 3rd session	parl.4:sess.3(1868:Aug.25-Sept.24)^{10} 1868:2^{11}
4	25 September 1868 – 20 October 1868	4th Parliament: 3rd session	1868:3^{11} v.004 mo.SEP25-OCT20 yr.1868^{11} v.4^{12}
5	1 June 1869 – 16 July 1869	4th Parliament: 4th session	parl.4:sess.4(1869:Jun.1-Jul.16)^{10} 1869:1^{11}
6	20 July 1869 – 3 September 1869	4th Parliament: 4th session	parl.4:sess.4(1869:Jul.20-Sept.3)^{10} 1869:2^{11} v.006 yr.1869 mo.JUL20-SEP03.^{11} v.6^{12}
7	14 June 1870 – 20 July 1870	4th Parliament: 5th session	parl.4:sess.5(1870:Jun.14-Jul.20)^{10} 1870:1^{11} v.007 mo.JUN14-JUL20 yr.1870.^{11}
8	21 July 1870 – 12 August 1870	4th Parliament: 5th session	1870:2^{11} v.008 mo.JUL21-AUG12 yr.1870.^{11}
9	15 August 1870 – 13 September 1870	4th Parliament: 5th session	parl.4:sess.5(1870:Aug.15-Sept.13)^{10} 1870:3^{11} v.009 yr.1870 mo.AUG15-SEP13.^{11} v.9^{12}
10	14 August 1871 – 28 September 1871	5th Parliament: 1st session	1871:1^{11} v.010 mo.AUG14-SEP28 yr.1871.^{11}
11	29 September 1871 – 16 November 1871	5th Parliament: 1st session	parl.5:sess.1(1871:Sept.29-Nov.16)^{10} v.11^{12}
12	16 July 1872 – 29 August 1872	5th Parliament: 2nd session	parl.5:sess.2(1872:Jul.16-Aug.29)^{10} 1872:1^{11} v.012 mo.JUL16-AUG29 yr.1872.^{11}
13	30 August 1872 – 25 October 1872	5th Parliament: 2nd session	parl.5:sess.2(1872:Aug.30-Oct.25)^{10} 1872:2^{11} v.013 mo.AUG30-OCT25 yr.1872.^{11}
14	15 July 1873 – 27 August 1873	5th Parliament: 3rd session	v.014 mo.JUL15-AUG27 yr.1873.^{11}
15	28 August 1873 – 3 October 1873	5th Parliament: 3rd session	1873:2^{11} v.015 mo.AUG28-OCT03 yr.1873.^{11} v.15^{12} v.15^{9}
16	3 July 1874 – 31 August 1874	5th Parliament: 4th session	parl.5:sess.4(1874:Jul.3-Aug.31)^{10}
17	20 July 1875 – 27 August 1875	5th Parliament: 5th session	parl.5:sess.5(1875:Jul.20-Aug.27)^{10} 1875:1^{11} v.017 mo.JUL20-AUG27 yr.1875.^{11} v.17^{12}
18	31 August 1875 – 27 September 1875	5th Parliament: 5th session	1875:2^{11} v.018 mo.AUG31-SEP27 yr.1875.^{11} v.18^{12}
19	28 September 1875 – 21 October 1875	5th Parliament: 5th session	1875:3^{11} v.019 mo.SEP28-OCT21 yr.1875.^{11} v.19^{12}
20	15 June 1876 – 28 July 1876	6th Parliament: 1st session	1876:1^{11}
21	1 August 1876 – 31 August 1876	6th Parliament: 1st session	1876:2^{11}
22	4 September 1876 – 3 October 1876	6th Parliament: 1st session	1876:3^{11}
23	3 October 1876 – 31 October 1876	6th Parliament: 1st session	1876:4^{11} v.023 mo.OCT03-31 yr.1876.^{11} v.23^{12} v.23^{9}
24	19 July 1877 – 23 August 1877	6th Parliament: 2nd session	1877:1^{11} v.024 mo.JUL19-AUG23 yr.1877^{11} v.24^{9} parl.6:sess.2 (1877:Jul.19-Aug.23)^{10}
25	24 August 1876 – 27 September 1877	6th Parliament: 2nd session	1877:2^{11} v.025 mo.AUG24-SEP27 yr.1877^{11} parl.6:sess.2 (1877:Aug.24-Sept.27)^{10}
26	27 September 1877 – 1 November 1877	6th Parliament: 2nd session	1877:3^{11} v.026 mo.SEP27-NOV01 yr.1877.^{11} parl.6:sess.2 (1877:Sept.27-Nov.1)^{10}
27	2 November 1877 – 10 December 1877	6th Parliament: 2nd session	1877:4^{11} v.27^{12} v.027 mo.NOV02-DEC10 yr.1877^{11} v.27^{9} parl.6:sess.2 (1877:Nov.2-Dec.10)^{10}
28	26 July 1878 – 2 September 1878	6th Parliament: 3rd session	1878:1^{11} v.028 mo.JUL26-SEP02 yr.1878^{11} v.28^{9} parl.6:sess.3 (1878:Jul.26-Sept.2)^{10}
29	3 September 1878 – 10 October 1878	6th Parliament: 3rd session	1878:2^{11} v.29^{12} v.029 mo.SEP03-OCT10 yr.1878^{11} parl.6:sess.3 (1878:Sept.3-Oct.10)^{10}
30	10 October 1878 – 2 November 1878	6th Parliament: 3rd session	1878:3^{11} v.30^{9} parl.6:sess.3 (1878:Oct.10-Nov.2)^{10}
31	11 July 1879 – 11 August 1879	6th Parliament: 4th session	1879:1^{11} v.31^{12} v.31^{9}
32	24 September 1879 – 30 October 1879	7th Parliament: 1st session	1879:2^{11} v.032 mo.SEP24-OCT30 yr.1879^{11} v.32^{9} parl.7:sess.1 (1879:Sept.24-Oct.30)^{10}
33	21 October 1879 – 26 November 1879	7th Parliament: 1st session	1879:3^{11} v.033 mo.OCT31-NOV26 yr.1879.^{11} parl.7:sess.1 (1879:Oct.31-Nov.26)^{10}
34	27 November 1879 – 19 December 1879	7th Parliament: 1st session	1879:4^{11} v.034 mo.NOV27-DEC19 yr.1879.^{11} v.34^{9} parl.7:sess.1 (1879:Nov.27-Dec.19)^{10}
35	28 May 1880 – 2 July 1880	7th Parliament: 2nd session	1880:1^{11} v.35^{9} parl.7:sess.2 (1880:May.28-Jul.2)^{10}
36	6 July 1880 – 29 July 1880	7th Parliament: 2nd session	1880:2^{11} v.36^{9}
37	30 July 1880 – 1 September 1880	7th Parliament: 2nd session	1880:3^{11} v.37^{12} v.37^{9} parl.7:sess.2 (1880:Jul.30-Sept.1)^{10}
38	9 June 1881 – 21 July 1881	7th Parliament: 3rd session	1881:1^{11} parl.7:sess.3 (1881:Jun.9-Jul.21)^{10}
39	22 July 1881 – 18 August 1881	7th Parliament: 3rd session	1881:2^{11} v.39^{9}
40	19 August 1881 – 24 September 1881	7th Parliament: 3rd session	1881:3^{11} v.40^{9} v.40^{12}
41	18 May 1882 – 23 June 1882	8th Parliament: 1st session	parl.8:sess.1 (1882:May 18-Jun.22)^{10}
42	27 June 1882 – 28 July 1882	8th Parliament: 1st session	1882:1^{11} v.42^{12} parl.8:sess.1 (1882:Jun.22-27)^{10}
43	31 July 1882 – 15 September 1882	8th Parliament: 1st session	1882:2^{11} v.043 mo.JUL31-SEP15 yr.1882^{11} v.43^{9} parl.8:sess.1 (1882:Jul.31-Sep.15)^{10}
44	14 June 1883 – 8 July 1883	8th Parliament: 2nd session	1883:1^{11} v.044 mo.JUN14-JUL18 yr.1883^{11} v.44^{9}
45	19 July 1883 – 14 August 1883	8th Parliament: 2nd session	1883:2^{11}
46	15 August 1883 – 8 September 1883	8th Parliament: 2nd session	1883:3^{11} v.46^{12} v.046 mo.AUG15-SEP08 yr.1883^{11} parl.8:sess.2 (1883:Aug.15-Sep.8)^{10}
47	5 June 1884 – 24 June 1884	8th Parliament: 3rd session	1884:1^{11} v.047 mo.JUN05-JUN24 yr.1884.^{11} parl.8:sess.3 (1884:Jun.5-24)^{10}
48	7 August 1884 – 25 September 1884	9th Parliament: 1st session	1884:2^{11} v.048 mo.AUG07-SEP25 yr.1884^{11} v.48^{9} parl.9:sess.1 (1884:Aug.7-Sep.25)^{10}
49	25 September 1884 – 22 October 1884	9th Parliament: 1st session	1884:3^{11} v.049 mo.SEP25-OCT22 yr.1884^{11} v.49^{9} parl.9:sess.1 (1884:Sep.25-Oct.22)^{10}
50	23 October 1884 – 10 November 1884	9th Parliament: 1st session	1884:4^{11} v.050 mo.OCT23-NOV10 yr.1884^{11} v.50^{9} parl.9:sess.1 (1884:Oct.23-Nov.10)^{10}
51	11 June 1885 – 15 July 1885	9th Parliament: 2nd session	1885:1^{11} v.051 mo.JUN11-JUL15 yr.1885^{11} parl.9:sess.2 (1885:Jun.11-Jul.15)^{10}
52	16 July 1885 – 11 August 1885	9th Parliament: 2nd session	1885:2^{11} v.052 mo.JUL16-AUG11 yr.1885^{11} parl.9:sess.2 (1885:Jul.16-Aug.11)^{10}
53	12 August 1885 – 22 September 1885	9th Parliament: 2nd session	1885:3^{11} v.053 mo.AUG12-SEP22 yr.1885^{11} parl.9:sess.2 (1885:Aug.12-Sep.22)^{10}
54	13 May 1886 – 21 June 1886	9th Parliament: 3rd session	1886:1^{11} v.054 mo.MAY13-JUN21 yr.1886^{11} parl.9:sess.3 (1886:May.13-Jun.21)^{10}
55	22 June 1886 – 19 July 1886	9th Parliament: 3rd session	1886:2^{11} v.055 mo.JUN22-JUL19 yr.1886^{11} parl.9:sess.3 (1886:Jun.22-Jul.19)^{10}
56	20 July 1886 – 18 August 1886	9th Parliament: 3rd session	1886:3^{11} parl.9:sess.3 (1886:Jul.20-Aug.18)^{10}
57	26 April 1887 – 10 June 1887	9th Parliament: 4th session	1887:1^{11} v.57^{12}
58	6 October 1887 – 24 November 1887	10th Parliament: 1st session	1887:2^{11} v.58^{9} parl.10:sess.1 (1887:Oct.6-Nov.24)^{10}
59	25 November 1887 – 22 December 1887	10th Parliament: 1st session	v.059 mo.NOV25-DEC22 yr.1887^{11} parl.10:sess.1 (1887:Nov.25-Dec.22)^{10}
60	10 May 1888 – 12 June 1888	10th Parliament: 2nd session	1888:1^{11} v.060 mo.MAY10-JUN12 yr.1888^{11} parl.10:sess.2 (1888:May.10-Jun.12)^{10}
61	13 June 1888 – 12 July 1888	10th Parliament: 2nd session	1888:2^{11} v.061 mo.JUN13-JUL12 yr.1888.^{11} parl.10:sess.2 (1888:Jun.13-Jul.12)^{10}
62	2 July 1888 – 8 August 1888	10th Parliament: 2nd session	1888:3^{11} v.62^{9} parl.10:sess.2 (1888:Jul.13-Aug.8)^{10}
63	9 August 1888 – 30 August 1888	10th Parliament: 2nd session	1888:4^{11} v.63^{12}
64	20 June 1889 – 23 July 1889	10th Parliament: 3rd session	1889:1^{11}
65	24 July 1889 – 21 August 1889	10th Parliament: 3rd session	1889:2^{11} v.065 mo.JUL24-AUG21 yr.1889.^{11}
66	22 August 1889 – 16 September 1889	10th Parliament: 3rd session	1889:3^{11} v.66^{12}
67	19 June 1890 – 16 July 1890	10th Parliament: 4th session	1890:1^{11} v.67^{12}
68	17 July 1890 – 14 August 1890	10th Parliament: 4th session	v.068 mo.JUL17-AUG15 yr.1890.^{11} v.68^{12} v.68^{9} v.68^{12}
69	15 August 1890 – 17 September 1890	10th Parliament: 4th session	1890:3^{11} v.69^{9} v.69^{12}
70	23 January 1891 – 30 January 1891	11th Parliament: 1st session	1891:1^{11} v.070 mo.JAN23-JUL07 yr.1891.^{11} v.70^{9} parl.11:sess.1 (1891:Jan.23-Jan.30)^{10}
71	11 June 1891 – 7 July 1891	11th Parliament: 2nd session	1891:1^{11} v.071 mo.JAN23-JUL07 yr.1891.^{11} v.71^{9}
72	8 July 1891 – 30 July 1891	11th Parliament: 2nd session	1891:2^{11} parl.11:sess.2 (1891:Jul.8-Jul.30)^{10}
73	31 July 1891 – 25 August 1891	11th Parliament: 2nd session	1891:3^{11} v.73^{9} parl.11:sess.2 (1891:Jul.31-Aug.25)^{10}
74	26 August 1891 – 25 September 1891	11th Parliament: 2nd session	1891:4^{11} v.074 mo.AUG26-SEP25 yr.1891.^{11} v.74^{9} parl.11:sess.2 (1891:Aug.26-Sept.25)^{10}
75	23 June 1892 – 20 July 1892	11th Parliament: 3rd session	1892:1^{11} v.075 mo.JUN23-JUL20 yr.1892.^{11} v.75^{9} parl.11:sess.3 (1892:Jun.23-Jul.20)^{10}
76	21 July 1892 – 11 August 1892	11th Parliament: 3rd session	1892:2^{11} v.076 mo.JUL21-AUG11 yr.1892.^{11} v.76^{9} parl.11:sess.3 (1892:Jul.21-Aug.11)^{10}
77	12 August 1892 – 7 September 1892	11th Parliament: 3rd session	1892:3^{11} v.077 mo.AUG12-SEP07 yr.1892.^{11} parl.11:sess.3 (1892:Aug.12-Sept.7)^{10}
78	8 September 1892 – 11 October 1892	11th Parliament: 3rd session	1892:4^{11} v.078 mo.SEP08-OCT11 yr.1892.^{11} parl.11:sess.3 (1892:Sept.8-Oct.11)^{10}
79	22 June 1893 – 19 July 1893	11th Parliament: 4th session	1893:1^{11} parl.11:sess.4 (1893:Jun.22-Jul.19)^{10}
80	20 July 1893 – 11 August 1893	11th Parliament: 4th session	1893:2^{11} v.080 mo.JUL20-AUG11 yr.1893.^{11} parl.11:sess.4 (1893:Jul.20-Aug.11)^{10}
81	15 August 1893 – 5 September 1893	11th Parliament: 4th session	1893:3^{11} parl.11:sess.4 (1893:Aug.15-Sept.5)^{10}
82	6 September 1893 – 6 October 1893	11th Parliament: 4th session	1893:4^{11} v.082 mo.SEP06-OCT06 yr.1893.^{11} v.82 1893^{13} v.82^{12} parl.11:sess.4 (1893:Sept.6-Oct.6)^{10}
83	21 June 1894 – 20 July 1894	12th Parliament: 1st session	1894:1^{11} v.083 mo.JUN21-JUL20 yr.1894.^{11} v.83 1894^{13} parl.12:sess.1 (1894:Jun.21-Jul.20)^{10}
84	24 July 1894 – 15 August 1894	12th Parliament: 1st session	1894:2^{11} v.084 mo.JUL24-AUG15 yr.1894.^{11} v.84 1894^{13} parl.12:sess.1 (1894:Jul.24-Aug.15)^{10}
85	16 August 1894 – 14 September 1894	12th Parliament: 1st session	1894:3^{11} v.085 mo.AUG16-SEP14 yr.1894.^{11} v.85^{12} v.85 1894^{13} parl.12:sess.1 (1894:Aug.16-Sept.14)^{10}
86	17 September 1894 – 24 October 1894	12th Parliament: 1st session	1894:4^{11} v.086 mo.SEP17-OCT24 yr.1894.^{11} v.86 1894^{13} parl.12:sess.1 (1894:Sept.17-Oct.24)^{10}
87	20 June 1895 – 17 July 1895	12th Parliament: 2nd session	1895:1^{11} v.87 1895^{13} parl.12:sess.2 (1895:Jun.20-Jul.17)^{10}
88	18 July 1895 – 9 August 1895	12th Parliament: 2nd session	1895:2^{11} v.088 mo.JUL18-AUG12 yr.1895.^{11} v.88 1895^{13} parl.12:sess.2 (1895:Jul.18-Aug.9)^{10}
89	13 August 1895 – 3 September 1895	12th Parliament: 2nd session	1895:3^{11} v.089 mo.AUG18-SEP02 yr.1895.^{11} v.89 1895^{13} parl.12:sess.2 (1895:Aug.13-Sept.3)^{10}
90	3 September 1895 – 1 October 1895	12th Parliament: 2nd session	1895:4^{11} v.90 1895^{13} parl.12:sess.2 (1895:Sept.3-Oct.1)^{10}
91	2 October 1895 – 1 November 1895	12th Parliament: 2nd session	1895:5^{11} v.91^{12} v.91 1895^{13}
92	11 June 1896 – 7 July 1896	12th Parliament: 3rd session	1896:1^{11} v.092 mo.JUN11-JUL07 yr.1896.^{11} v.92 1896^{13} parl.12:sess.3 (1896:Jun.11-Jul.7)^{10}
93	3 July 1896 – 31 July 1896	12th Parliament: 3rd session	1896:2^{11} v.093 mo.JUL08-JUL31 yr.1896.^{11} v.93 1896^{13} parl.12:sess.3 (1896:Jul.8-Jul.31)^{10}
94	4 August 1896 – 21 August 1896	12th Parliament: 3rd session	1896:3^{11} v.094 mo.AUG04-AUG24 yr.1896.^{11} v.94 1896^{13} parl.12:sess.3 (1896:Aug.4-21)^{10}
95	25 August 1894 – 15 September 1896	12th Parliament: 3rd session	1896:4^{11} v.095 mo.AUG25-SEP15 yr.1896.^{11} v.95^{12} v.95 1896^{13} parl.12:sess.3 (1896:Aug.25-Sep.15)^{10}
96	16 September 1896 – 17 October 1896	12th Parliament: 3rd session	1896:5^{11} v.96 1896^{13} v.92–96 1896 index^{13} parl.12:sess.3 (1896:Sep.16-Oct.17)^{10}
97	6 April 1897 – 10 April 1897	13th Parliament: 1st session	1897:1^{11} v.097 mo.APR06-OCT19 yr.1897.^{11} v.97–98 1897^{13} v.97–98^{12} parl.13:sess.1 (1897:Apr.6-10)^{10}
98	23 September 1897 – 19 October 1897	13th Parliament: 2nd session	1897:1^{11} v.098 mo.APR06-OCT19 yr.1897.^{11} v.97–98 1897^{13} v.97–98^{12} parl.13:sess.1 (1897:Apr.6-10)^{10}
99	20 October 1897 – 12 November 1897	13th Parliament: 2nd session	1897:2^{11} v.99 1897^{13} parl.13:sess.2 (1897:Oct.20-Nov.12)^{10}
100	16 November 1897 – 21 December 1897	13th Parliament: 2nd session	1897:3^{11} v.100 mo.NOV16-DEC21 yr.1897.^{11} v.100 1897^{13} parl.13:sess.2 (1897:Nov.16-Dec.21)^{10}
101	24 June 1898 – 22 July 1898	13th Parliament: 3rd session	1898:1^{11} v.101 mo.JUN24-JUL22 yr.1898.^{11} v.101 1898^{13} parl.13:sess.3 (1898:Jun.24-Jul.22)^{10}
102	26 July 1898 – 19 August 1898	13th Parliament: 3rd session	1898:2^{11} v.102 mo.JUL26-AUG19 yr.1898.^{11} v.102 1898^{13} parl.13:sess.3 (1898:Jul.26-Aug.19)^{10}
103	23 August 1898 – 9 September 1898	13th Parliament: 3rd session	1898:3^{11} v.103 mo.AUG23-SEP07 yr.1898.^{11} v.103 1898^{13} parl.13:sess.3 (1898:Aug.23-Sep.9)^{10}
104	13 September 1898 – 13 October 1898	13th Parliament: 3rd session	1898:4^{11} v.104 1898^{13} parl.13:sess.3 (1898:Sep.13-Oct.13)^{10}
105	14 October 1898 – 5 November 1898	13th Parliament: 3rd session	1898:5^{11} v.105 mo.OCT14-NOV05 yr.1898.^{11} v.105 1898^{13} v.105^{9} parl.13:sess.3 (1898:Oct.14-Nov.5)^{10}
106	23 June 1899 – 19 July 1899	13th Parliament: 4th session	1899:1^{11} v.106 mo.JUN23-JUL19 yr.1899^{11} v.106^{9} parl.13:sess.4 (1899:Jun.23-Jul.19)^{10}
107	20 July 1899 – 10 August 1899	13th Parliament: 4th session	1899:2^{11} v.107 mo.JUL20-AUG10 yr.1899.^{11} v.107 1899^{13} parl.13:sess.4 (1899:Jul.20-Aug.10)^{10}
108	11 August 1899 – 5 September 1899	13th Parliament: 4th session	1899:3^{11} v.108 mo.AUG11-SEP05 yr.1899.^{11} v.108 1899^{13}
109	6 September 1899 – 26 September 1899	13th Parliament: 4th session	1899:4^{11} v.109 mo.SEP06-SEP26 yr.1899.^{11} v.109 1899^{13}
110	27 September 1899 – 23 October 1899	13th Parliament: 4th session	1899:5^{11} v.110 mo.SEP27-OCT23 yr.1899.^{11} v.110 1899^{13}
111	21 June 1900 – 19 July 1900	14th Parliament: 1st session	1900:1^{11} v.111 mo.JUN21-JUL19 yr.1900.^{11} v.111 1900^{13}
112	19 July 1900 – 15 August 1900	14th Parliament: 1st session	1900:2^{11} v.112 mo.JUL19-AUG16 yr.1900.^{11} v.112 1900^{13}
113	16 August 1900 – 13 September 1900	14th Parliament: 1st session	1900:3^{11} v.113 1900^{13} v.113 mo.AUG16-SEP13 yr.1900^{11} v.113^{9}
114	14 September 1900 – 9 October 1900	14th Parliament: 1st session	1900:4^{11} v.114 mo.SEP14-OCT09 yr.1900.^{11} v.114 1900^{13}
115	9 October 1900 – 20 October 1900	14th Parliament: 1st session	1901:5^{11} v.115 mo.OCT09-OCT20 yr.1900.^{11} v.115^{9}
116	1 July 1901 – 26 July 1901	14th Parliament: 2nd session	1901:1^{11} v.116 1901^{13} v.116 mo.JUL01-JUL26 yr.1901^{11}
117	30 July 1901 – 28 August 1901	14th Parliament: 2nd session	1901:2^{11} v.117 mo.JUL30-AUG28 yr.1901^{11} v.117^{9}
118	29 August 1901 – 25 September 1901	14th Parliament: 2nd session	1901:3^{11} v.118 mo.AUG29-SEP25 yr.1901.^{11}
119	26 September 1901 – 7 November 1901	14th Parliament: 2nd session	1901:4^{11} v.119 mo.SEP26-NOV07 yr.1901^{11} v.119^{9}
120	1 July 1902 – 29 July 1902	14th Parliament: 3rd session	1902:1^{11} v.120 mo.JUL01-JUL29 yr.1902^{11} v.120^{9}
121	30 July 1902 – 29 August 1902	14th Parliament: 3rd session	1902:2^{11} v.121 mo.JUL30-AUG29 yr.1902^{11} v.121^{9}
122	2 September 1902 – 3 October 1902	14th Parliament: 3rd session	1902:3^{11} v.122 mo.SEP02-OCT03 yr.1902^{11}
123	29 June 1903 – 24 July 1903	15th Parliament: 1st session	1903:1^{11} v.123 mo.JUN29-JUL24 yr.1903^{11}
124	28 July 1903 – 21 August 1903	15th Parliament: 1st session	1903:2^{11} v.124 mo.JUL28-AUG21 yr.1903^{11} v.124^{9}
125	25 August 1903 – 26 September 1903	15th Parliament: 1st session	1903:3^{11} v.125 mo.AUG25-SEP26 yr.1903^{11} v.125^{9}
126	28 September 1903 – 23 October 1903	15th Parliament: 1st session	1903:4^{11} v.126^{9}
127	26 October 1903 – 24 November 1903	15th Parliament: 1st session	1903:5^{11}
128	28 June 1904 – 28 July 1904	15th Parliament: 2nd session	1904:1^{11} v.128 mo.JUN28-JUL28 yr.1904.^{11}
129	29 July 1904 – 31 August 1904	15th Parliament: 2nd session	1904:2^{11} v.129 mo.JUL29-AUG31 yr.1904.^{11}
130	1 September 1904 – 7 October 1904	15th Parliament: 2nd session	1904:3^{11} v.130 mo.SEP01-OCT07 yr.1904.^{11}
131	10 October 1904 – 8 November 1904	15th Parliament: 2nd session	1904:4^{11}
132	27 June 1905 – 21 July 1905	15th Parliament: 3rd session	1905:1^{11}
133	25 July 1905 – 18 August 1905	15th Parliament: 3rd session	v.133 1905^{11} v.133 mo.JUL25-AUG18 yr.1905.^{11}
134	22 August 1905 – 15 September 1905	15th Parliament: 3rd session	1905:3^{11} v.134 mo.AUG22-SEP15 yr.1905.^{11}
135	19 September 1905 – 30 October 1905	15th Parliament: 3rd session	
136	27 June 1906 – 29 June 1906	16th Parliament: 1st session	1906:1^{11} v.136 mo.JUN27-SEP27 yr.1906.^{11}
137	21 August 1906 – 27 September 1906	16th Parliament: 2nd session	1906:1^{11} v.137 mo.JUN27-SEP27 yr.1906.^{11}
138	28 September 1906 – 29 October 1906	16th Parliament: 2nd session	1906:2^{11} v.138 mo.SEP28-OCT29 yr.1906.^{11} v.138 1906^{13}
139	27 June 1907 – 1 August 1907	16th Parliament: 3rd session	1907:1^{11} v.139 mo.JUN27-AUG01 yr.1907.^{11}
140	2 August 1907 – 17 September 1907	16th Parliament: 3rd session	1907:2^{11} v.140 mo.AUG02-SEP17 yr.1907^{11}
141	18 September 1907 – 21 October 1907	16th Parliament: 3rd session	1907:3^{11} v.141 mo.SEP18-OCT20 yr.1907.^{11} Parliamentary debates. v. 141 (1907)^{10}
142	21 October 1907 – 25 November 1907	16th Parliament: 3rd session	1907:4^{11} v.142 mo.OCT21-NOV25 yr.1907.^{11} Parliamentary debates. v. 142 (1907))^{10}
143	29 June 1908 – 29 July 1908	16th Parliament: 4th session	1908:1^{11} v.143 mo.JUN29-JUL29 yr.1908.^{11} Parliamentary debates. v. 143 (1908)^{10}
144	30 July 1908 – 9 September 1908	16th Parliament: 4th session	1908:2^{11} v.144 mo.JUL30-SEP09 yr.1908.^{11} Parliamentary debates. v. 144 (1908)^{10}
145	10 September 1908 – 10 October 1908	16th Parliament: 4th session	v.145 mo.SEP10-OCT10 yr.1908^{11}
146^{4}	10 June 1909 – 16 June 1909	17th Parliament: 1st session	1909:1^{11} v.146-147 mo.JUN10-NOV05 yr.1909^{11}
147	7 October 1909 – 5 November 1909	17th Parliament: 2nd session	1909:1^{11} v.146-147 mo.JUN10-NOV05 yr.1909^{11}
148	10 November 1909 – 29 December 1909	17th Parliament: 2nd session	
149	28 June 1910 – 22 July 1910	17th Parliament: 3rd session	1910:1^{11} v.149 mo.JUN28-JUL22 yr.1910^{11}
150	26 July 1910 – 24 August 1910	17th Parliament: 3rd session	1910:2^{11} v.150 mo.JUL26-AUG24 yr.1910^{11}
151	25 August 1910 – 23 September 1910	17th Parliament: 3rd session	1910:3^{11} v.151 mo.AUG25-SEP23 yr.1910.^{11}
152	27 September 1910 – 21 October 1910	17th Parliament: 3rd session	1910:4^{11} v.152 mo.SEP27-OCT21 yr.1910.^{11}
153	25 October 1910 – 3 December 1910	17th Parliament: 3rd session	v.153 mo.OCT25-DEC03 yr.1910.^{11}
154	22 July 1911 – 25 August 1911	17th Parliament: 4th session	1911:1^{11} v.154 mo.JUL22-AUG25 yr.1911.^{11}
155	29 August 1911 – 20 September 1911	17th Parliament: 4th session	v.155 mo.AUG29-SEP20 yr.1911.^{11}
156	21 September 1911 – 28 October 1911	17th Parliament: 4th session	1911:3^{11} v.156 mo.SEP21-OCT28 yr.1911.^{11}
157	15 February 1912 – 29 February 1912	18th Parliament: 1st session	1912:1^{11} v.157 mo.FEB15-FEB29 yr.1912.^{11}
158	27 June 1912 – 14 August 1912	18th Parliament: 2nd session	v.158 1912^{11} 1912:2^{11} v.158^{13}
159	15 August 1912 – 5 September 1912	18th Parliament: 2nd session	1912:3^{11} v.159 mo.AUG15-SEP05 yr.1912.^{11} v.159^{13}
160	6 September 1912 – 8 October 1912	18th Parliament: 2nd session	v.160 1912^{11} v.160 mo.SEP06-OCT08 yr.1912.^{11} v.160^{13}
161	9 October 1912 – 7 November 1912	18th Parliament: 2nd session	v.161 mo.OCT09-NOV07 yr.1912.^{11} v.161^{13}
162	26 June 1913 – 23 July 1913	18th Parliament: 3rd session	1913:1^{11} v.162 mo.JUN26-JUL23 yr.1913.^{11} v.162^{13}
163	24 July 1913 – 20 August 1913	18th Parliament: 3rd session	1913:2^{11} v.163 mo.JUL24-AUG20 yr.1913.^{11} v.163^{13}
164	21 August 1913 – 18 September 1913	18th Parliament: 3rd session	1913:3^{11} v.164 mo.AUG21-SEP18 yr.1913.^{11} v.164^{13}
165	19 September 1913 – 17 October 1913	18th Parliament: 3rd session	1913:4^{11} v.165 mo.SEP19-OCT17 yr.1913.^{11} v.165^{13}
166	20 October 1913 – 14 November 1913	18th Parliament: 3rd session	1913:5^{11} v.166 mo.OCT20-NOV14 yr.1913.^{11} v.166^{13}
167	17 November 1913 – 15 December 1913	18th Parliament: 3rd session	v.167 mo.NOV17-DEC15 yr.1913 mi.+index.^{11}
168	25 June 1914 – 21 July 1914	18th Parliament: 4th session	1914:1^{11} v.168^{13}
169	22 July 1914 – 15 September 1914	18th Parliament: 4th session	1914:2^{11} v.169 mo.JUL22-SEP15 yr.1914.^{11} v.169 1914^{13}
170	16 September 1914 – 13 October 1914	18th Parliament: 4th session	1914:3^{11} v.170 mo.SEP16-OCT13 yr.1914.^{11} v.170 1914^{13}
171	14 October 1914 – 5 November 1914	18th Parliament: 4th session	1914:4^{11} v.171 mo.OCT14-NOV05 yr.1914 mi.+index.^{11} v.171 1914^{13}
172	24 June 1915 – 4 August 1915	19th Parliament: 1st session	1915:1^{11} v.172 mo.JUN24-AUG04 yr.1915.^{11} v.172 1915^{13}
173	19 August 1915 – 17 September 1915	19th Parliament: 1st session	v.173 mo.AUG19-SEP17 yr.1915.^{11} v.173 1915^{13}
174	20 September 1915 – 12 October 1915	19th Parliament: 1st session	1915:3^{11} v.174 mo.SEP20-OCT12 yr.1915 mi.+index.^{11} v.174 1915^{13}
175	9 May 1916 – 15 June 1916	19th Parliament: 2nd session	1916:1^{11} v.175 mo.MAY09-JUN15 yr.1916.^{11} v.175 1916^{13}
176	16 June 1916 – 11 July 1916	19th Parliament: 2nd session	1916:2^{11} v.176 mo.JUN16-JUL11 yr.1916.^{11} v.176 1916^{13}
177	12 July 1916 – 8 August 1916	19th Parliament: 2nd session	1916:3^{11} v.177 mo.JUL12-AUG08 yr.1916.^{11} v.177 1916^{13}
178	28 June 1917 – 3 August 1917	19th Parliament: 3rd session	1917:1^{11} v.178 mo.JUN28-AUG03 yr.1917.^{11} v.178 1917^{13}
179	7 August 1917 – 7 September 1917	19th Parliament: 3rd session	1917:2^{11} v.179 mo.AUG07-SEP07 yr.1917.^{11} v.179 1917^{13}
180	11 September 1917 – 10 October 1917	19th Parliament: 3rd session	1917:3^{11} v.180 mo.SEP11-OCT10 yr.1917.^{11} v.180 1917^{13}
181	11 October 1917 – 1 November 1917	19th Parliament: 3rd session	1917:4^{11} v.181 mo.OCT11-NOV01 yr.1917 mi.index^{11}
182	9 April 1918 – 15 April 1918	19th Parliament: 4th session	1918:1^{11} v.182 mo.APR09-APR15 yr.1918^{11}
183	24 October 1918 – 10 December 1918	19th Parliament: 5th session	1918:2^{11} v.183 mo.OCT24-DEC10 yr.1918 mi.index.^{11}
184	28 August 1919 – 2 October 1919	19th Parliament: 6th session	1919:1^{11} v.184 mo.AUG28-OCT02 yr.1919.^{11}
185	3 October 1919 – 5 November 1919	19th Parliament: 6th session	
186	24 June 1920 – 5 August 1920	20th Parliament: 1st session	1920:1^{11} v.186 mo.JUN24-AUG05 yr.1920.^{11}
187	6 August 1920 – 24 September 1920	20th Parliament: 1st session	v.187 mo.AUG06-SEP24 yr.1920.^{11}
188	27 September 1920 – 22 October 1920	20th Parliament: 1st session	1920:3^{11} v.188 mo.SEP27-OCT22 yr.1920.^{11}
189	25 October 1920 – 11 November 1920	20th Parliament: 1st session	1920:4^{11} v.189 mo.OCT25-NOV11 yr.1920.^{11}
190	10 March 1921 – 22 March 1921	20th Parliament: 2nd session	1921:1^{11} v.190 mo.MAR10-MAR22 yr.1921.^{11}
191	22 September 1921 – 2 November 1921	20th Parliament: 3rd session	1921:2^{11} v.191 mo.SEP22-NOV02 yr.1921.^{11}
192	3 November 1921 – 14 December 1921	20th Parliament: 3rd session	1921–22:1^{11} v.192 mo.NOV03-DEC14 yr.1921.^{11}
193	15 December 1921 – 31 January 1922	20th Parliament: 3rd session	1921–22:2^{11} v.193 mo.DEC15-JAN31 yr.1921-22^{11}
194	1 February 1922 – 11 February 1922	20th Parliament: 3rd session	1921–22:3^{11} v.194 mo.FEB01-FEB11 yr.1921–22.^{11}
195	30 June 1922 – 2 August 1922	20th Parliament: 4th session	1922:1^{11} v.195 mo.JUN30-AUG02 yr.1922^{11}
196	3 August 1922 – 13 September 1922	20th Parliament: 4th session	1922:2^{11} v.196 mo.AUG03-SEP13 yr.1922^{11}
197	14 September 1922 – 9 October 1922	20th Parliament: 4th session	1922:23^{11} v.197 mo.SEP14-OCT09 yr.1922.^{11}
198	10 October 1922 – 31 October 1922	20th Parliament: 4th session	1922:4^{11} v.198 mo.OCT10-OCT31 yr.1922 mi.+index.^{11}
199	7 February 1923 – 17 February 1923	21st Parliament: 1st session	1923:1^{11}v.199 mo.FEB07-FEB17 yr.1923^{11}
200	14 June 1923 – 18 July 1923	21st Parliament: 2nd session	1923:2^{11}v.200 mo.JUN14-JUL18 yr.1923^{11}
201	19 July 1923 – 13 August 1923	21st Parliament: 2nd session	1923:3^{11} v.201 mo.JUL19-AUG13 yr.1923^{11}
202	14 August 1923 – 29 August 1923	21st Parliament: 2nd session	1923:4^{11}v.202 mo.AUG14-AUG29 yr.1923 mi.+index^{11}
203	26 June 1924 – 12 August 1924	21st Parliament: 3rd session	1924:1^{11}v.203 mo.JUN26-AUG12 yr.1924^{11}
204	13 August 1924 – 29 September 1924	21st Parliament: 3rd session	1924:2^{11}v.204 mo.AUG13-SEP29 yr.1924^{11}
205	30 September 1924 – 6 November 1924	21st Parliament: 3rd session	1924:3^{11}v.205 mo.SEP30-NOV06 yr.1924 mi.index^{11}
206	25 June 1925 – 29 July 1925	21st Parliament: 4th session	1925:1^{11}v.206 mo.JUN25-JUL29 yr.1925^{11}
207	30 July 1925 – 2 September 1925	21st Parliament: 4th session	1925:2^{11}v.207 mo.JUL30-SEP02 yr.1925^{11}
208	3 September 1925 – 1 October 1925	21st Parliament: 4th session	1925:3^{11}v.208 mo.SEP03-OCT01 yr.1925 mi.index^{11}
209	16 June 1926 – 30 July 1926	22nd Parliament: 1st session	1926:1^{11}v.209 mo.JUN16-JUL30 yr.1926^{11}
210	3 August 1926 – 28 August 1926	22nd Parliament: 1st session	1926:2^{11}v.210 mo.AUG03-AUG28 yr.1926^{11}
211	30 August 1926 – 11 September 1926	22nd Parliament: 1st session	1926:3^{11}v.211 mo.AUG30-SEP11 yr.1926 mi.+index^{11}
212	23 June 1927 – 27 July 1927	22nd Parliament: 2nd session	v.212 mo.JUN28-JUL27 yr.1927^{11}
213	28 July 1927 – 9 September 1927	22nd Parliament: 2nd session	
214	13 September 1927 – 14 October 1927	22nd Parliament: 2nd session	v.214 mo.SEP13-OCT14 yr.1927^{11}
215	17 October 1927 – 9 November 1927	22nd Parliament: 2nd session	
216	10 November 1927 – 5 December 1927	22nd Parliament: 2nd session	v.216 mo.NOV10-DEC05 yr.1927 mi.+index^{11}
217	28 June 1928 – 3 August 1928	22nd Parliament: 3rd session	
218	7 August 1928 – 4 September 1928	22nd Parliament: 3rd session	1928:1^{11} v.218 mo.AUG07-SEP04 yr.1928^{11}
219	5 September 1928 – 9 October 1928	22nd Parliament: 3rd session	1928:2^{11}
220	4 December 1928 – 14 December 1928	23rd Parliament: 1st session	1928:3^{11}
221	27 June 1929 – 6 August 1929	23rd Parliament: 2nd session	1929:1^{11}v.221 mo.JUN27-AUG06 yr.1929^{11}
222	7 August 1929 – 20 September 1929	23rd Parliament: 2nd session	1929:2^{11}
223	24 September 1929 – 9 November 1929	23rd Parliament: 2nd session	v.223 mo.SEP24-NOV09 yr.1929 mi.index^{11}
224	26 June 1930 – 6 August 1930	23rd Parliament: 3rd session	1930:1^{11}v.224 mo.JUN26-AUG06 yr.1930^{11}
225	7 August 1930 – 18 September 1930	23rd Parliament: 3rd session	1930:2^{11} v.225 mo.AUG07-SEP18 yr.1930^{11}
226	19 September 1930 – 25 October 1930	23rd Parliament: 3rd session	1930:3^{11} v.226 mo.SEP19-OCT25 yr.1930 mi.index^{11}
227	11 March 1931 – 28 April 1931	23rd Parliament: 4th session	1931:1^{11} v.227 mo.MAR11-APR28 yr.1931^{11}
228	25 June 1931 – 31 July 1931	23rd Parliament: 5th session	1931:2^{11} v.228 mo.JUN25-JUL31 yr.1931^{11}
229	4 August 1931 – 22 September 1931	23rd Parliament: 5th session	1931:3^{11} v.229 mo.AUG04-SEP22 yr.1931^{11}
230	2 October 1931 – 11 November 1931	23rd Parliament: 5th session	1931:4^{11} v.230 mo.OCT02-NOV11 yr.1931^{11}
231	23 February 1932 – 12 April 1932	24th Parliament: 1st session	1932:1^{11} v.231 mo.FEB23-APR12 yr.1932^{11}
232	13 April 1932 – 10 May 1932	24th Parliament: 1st session	1932:2^{11} v.232 mo.APR13-MAY10 yr.1932^{11}
233	22 September 1932 – 28 October 1932	24th Parliament: 1st session	1932:3^{11} v.233 mo.SEP22-OCT28 yr.1932^{11}
234	1 November 1932 – 9 December 1932	24th Parliament: 2nd session	1932–33:1^{11} v.234 mo.NOV01-DEC09 yr.1932^{11}
235	26 January 1933 – 10 March 1933	24th Parliament: 2nd session	1932–33:1^{11} v.235 mo.JAN26-MAR10 yr.1933^{11}
236	21 September 1933 – 31 October 1933	24th Parliament: 3rd session	1933:1^{11}
237	1 November 1933 – 22 December 1933	24th Parliament: 3rd session	1933:2^{11}
238	28 June 1934 – 3 August 1934	24th Parliament: 4th session	1934–35:1^{11} v.238 mo.JUN28-AUG03 yr.1934^{11}
239	7 August 1934 – 14 September 1934	24th Parliament: 4th session	1934–35:2^{11} v.239 mo.AUG07-SEP14 yr.1934^{11}
240	18 September 1934 – 10 November 1934	24th Parliament: 4th session	v.240 mo.SEP18-NOV10 yr.1934^{11}
241	13 February 1935 – 5 April 1935	24th Parliament: 4th session	1934–35:4^{11} v.241 mo.FEB13-APR05 yr.1935^{11}
242	29 August 1935 – 26 September 1935	24th Parliament: 5th session	1935:1^{11} v.242 mo.AUG29-SEP26 yr.1935^{11}
243	27 September 1935 – 26 October 1935	24th Parliament: 5th session	1935:2^{11} v.243 mo.SEP27-OCT26 yr.1935^{11}
244	25 March 1936 – 6 May 1936	25th Parliament: 1st session	1936:1^{11} v.244 mo.MAR25-MAY06 yr.1936^{11}
245	7 May 1936 – 11 June 1936	25th Parliament: 1st session	v.245 mo.MAY07-JUN11 yr.1936^{11}
246	21 July 1936 – 3 September 1936	25th Parliament: 1st session	v.246 mo.JUL21-SEP03 yr.1936^{11}
247	4 September 1936 – 31 October 1936	25th Parliament: 1st session	1936:4^{11} v.247 mo.SEP04-OCT31 yr.1936^{11}
248	9 September 1937 – 29 October 1937	25th Parliament: 2nd session	1937–38:1^{11} v.248 mo.SEP09-OCT29 yr.1937^{11}
249	2 November 1937 – 10 December 1937	25th Parliament: 2nd session	1937–38:2^{11} v.249 mo.NOV02-DEC10 yr.1937^{11}
250	1 March 1938 – 15 March 1938	25th Parliament: 2nd session	1937–38:3^{11} v.250 mo.MAR01-MAR15 yr.1938^{11}
251	28 June 1938 – 3 August 1938	25th Parliament: 3rd session	1938:1^{11} v.251 mo.JUN28-AUG03 yr.1938^{11}
252	4 August 1938 – 26 August 1938	25th Parliament: 3rd session	1938:2^{11} v.252 mo.AUG04-AUG26 yr.1938^{11}
253	30 August 1938 – 16 September 1938	25th Parliament: 3rd session	1938:3^{11} v.253 mo.AUG30-SEP16 yr.1938^{11}
254	27 June 1939 – 3 August 1939	26th Parliament: 1st session	1939:1^{11} v.254 mo.JUN27-AUG03 yr.1939^{11}
255	4 August 1939 – 31 August 1939	26th Parliament: 1st session	1939:2^{11} v.255 mo.AUG04-AUG31 yr.1939^{11}
256	1 September 1939 – 7 October 1939	26th Parliament: 1st session	1939:3^{11} v.256 mo.SEP01-OCT07 yr.1939^{11}
257	30 May 1940 – 30 August 1940	26th Parliament: 2nd session	1940:1^{11} v.257 mo.MAY30-AUG30 yr.1940^{11}
258	1 October 1940 – 6 December 1940	26th Parliament: 2nd session	1940:2^{11} v.258 mo.OCT01-DEC06 yr.1940^{11}
259	12 March 1941 – 6 August 1941	26th Parliament: 3rd session	1941:1^{11} v.259 mo.MAR12-AUG06 yr.1941^{11}
260	7 August 1941 – 17 October 1941	26th Parliament: 3rd session	v.260 mo.AUG07-OCT17 yr.1941^{11}
261	11 December 1941 – 4 December 1942	26th Parliament: 4th session	v.261 mo.DEC11-DEC04 yr.1941-42^{11}
262	24 February 1943 – 24 June 1943	26th Parliament: 5th session	1943:1^{11} v.262 mo.FEB24-JUN24 yr.1943^{11}
263	25 June 1943 – 26 August 1943	26th Parliament: 5th session	
264	22 February 1944 – 4 April 1944	27th Parliament: 1st session	1944:1^{11} v.264 mo.FEB22-APR04 yr.1944^{11}
265	26 July 1944 – 31 August 1944	27th Parliament: 1st session	1944:2^{11} v.265 mo.JUL26-AUG31 yr.1944^{11}
266	1 September 1944 – 11 October 1944	27th Parliament: 1st session	1944:3^{11} v.266 mo.SEP01-OCT11 yr.1944^{11}
267	12 October 1944 – 15 December 1944	27th Parliament: 1st session	1944:4^{11}
268	27 June 1945 – 3 August 1945	27th Parliament: 2nd session	1945:1^{11}
269	17 October 1947 – 27 November 1947	28th Parliament: 1st session	1945:2^{11} v.269 mo.AUG07-SEP14 yr.1945^{11}
270	19 September 1945 – 26 October 1945	27th Parliament: 2nd session	1945:3^{11} v.270 mo.SEP19-OCT26 yr.1945^{11}
271	31 October 1945 – 21 November 1945	27th Parliament: 2nd session	1945:4^{11} v.271 mo.OCT31-NOV21 yr.1945^{11}
272	22 November 1945 – 7 December 1945	27th Parliament: 2nd session	1945:5^{11} v.272 mo.NOV22-DEC07 yr.1945^{11}
273	26 June 1946 – 31 July 1946	27th Parliament: 3rd session	1946:1^{11}
274	1 August 1946 – 13 September 1946	27th Parliament: 3rd session	1946:2^{11}
275	17 September 1946 – 12 October 1946	27th Parliament: 3rd session	1946:3^{11}
276	24 June 1947 – 29 July 1947	28th Parliament: 1st session	1947:1^{11} v.276 mo.JUN24-JUL29 yr.1947^{11}
277	30 July 1947 – 2 September 1947	28th Parliament: 1st session	1947:2^{11} v.277 mo.JUL30-SEP02 yr.1947^{11}
278	3 September 1947 – 16 October 1947	28th Parliament: 1st session	1947:3^{11} v.278 mo.SEP03-OCT16 yr.1947^{11}
279	17 October 1947 – 27 November 1947	28th Parliament: 1st session	v.279^{11}
280	22 June 1948 – 20 July 1948	28th Parliament: 2nd session	1948:1^{11} v.280 yr.1948^{11}
281	21 July 1948 – 18 August 1948	28th Parliament: 2nd session	1948:2^{11} v.281 yr.1948^{11}
282	19 August 1948 – 21 September 1948	28th Parliament: 2nd session	1948:3^{11} v.282 yr.1948^{11}
283	22 September 1948 – 29 October 1948	28th Parliament: 2nd session	1948:4^{11} v.283 yr.1948^{11}
284	2 November 1948 – 3 December 1948	28th Parliament: 2nd session	1948:5^{11} v.284 yr.1948^{11}
285	28 June 1949 – 27 July 1949	28th Parliament: 3rd session	1949:1^{11} v.285 mo.JUN28-JUL27 yr.1949^{11}
286	28 July 1949 – 25 August 1949	28th Parliament: 3rd session	1949:2^{11} v.286 mo.JUL28-AUG25 yr.1949^{11}
287	26 August 1949 – 29 September 1949	28th Parliament: 3rd session	1949:3^{11} v.287 mo.AUG26-SEP29 yr.1949^{11}
288	30 September 1949 – 21 October 1949	28th Parliament: 3rd session	1949:4^{11} v.288 mo.SEP30-OCT21 yr.1949^{11}
289	27 June 1950 – 2 August 1950	29th Parliament: 1st session	JUNE 27-AUG. 2 1950^{11} v.289 mo.JUN27-AUG02 yr.1950^{11}
290	3 August 1950 – 31 August 1950	29th Parliament: 1st session	AUG. 3–31 1950^{11} v.290 mo.AUG03-AUG31 yr.1950^{11}
291	1 September 1950 – 4 October 1950	29th Parliament: 1st session	SEPT. 1-OCT. 4 1950^{11} v.291 mo.SEP01-OCT04 yr.1950^{11}
292	5 October 1950 – 2 November 1950	29th Parliament: 1st session	OCT. 5-NOV. 2 1950^{11} v.292 mo.OCT05-NOV02 yr.1950^{11}
293	3 November 1950 – 1 December 1950	29th Parliament: 1st session	NOV. 3-DEC. 1 1950^{11} v.293 mo.NOV03-DEC01 yr.1950^{11}
294	26 June 1951 – 13 July 1951	29th Parliament: 2nd session	JUNE 26-JULY 13 1951^{11} v.294 mo.JUN26-JUL13 yr.1951^{11}
295	25 September 1951 – 14 November 1951	30th Parliament: 1st session	SEPT. 25-NOV. 14 1951^{11} v.295 mo.SEP25-NOV14 yr.1951^{11}
296	15 November 1951 – 6 December 1951	30th Parliament: 1st session	NOV. 15-DEC. 6 1951^{11} v.296 mo.NOV15-DEC06 yr.1951^{11}
297	25 June 1952 – 15 August 1952	30th Parliament: 2nd session	JUNE 25-AUG. 15 1952^{11} v.297 mo.JUN25-AUG15 yr.1952^{11}
298	19 August 1952 – 24 October 1952	30th Parliament: 2nd session	AUG. 19-OCT. 24 1952^{11} v.298 mo.AUG19-OCT24 yr.1952^{11}
299	8 April 1953 – 9 September 1953	30th Parliament: 3rd session	APRIL 8-SEPT. 9 1953^{11}
300	10 September 1953 – 27 October 1953	30th Parliament: 3rd session	SEPT. 10-OCT. 27 1953^{11} v.300 mo.SEP10-OCT27 yr.1953^{11}
301	28 October 1953 – 27 November 1953	30th Parliament: 3rd session	OCT. 28-NOV. 27 1953^{11} v.301 mo.OCT28-NOV27 yr.1953^{11}
302	12 January 1954 – 13 January 1954	30th Parliament: 4th session	
303	22 June 1954 – 5 August 1954	30th Parliament: 5th session	JUNE 22-AUG. 5 1954^{11} v.303 mo.JUN22-AUG05 yr.1954^{11}
304	6 August 1954 – 1 October 1954	30th Parliament: 5th session	AUG. 6-OCT. 1 1954^{11} v.304 mo.AUG06-OCT01 yr.1954^{11}
305	22 March 1955 – 6 May 1955	31st Parliament: 1st session	MAR. 22-MAY. 6 1955^{11} v.305 mo.MAR22-MAY06 yr.1955^{11}
306	19 July 1955 – 19 August 1955	31st Parliament: 1st session	JULY 19-AUG. 19 1955^{11} v.306 mo.JUL19-AUG19 yr.1955^{11}
307	23 August 1955 – 28 October 1955	31st Parliament: 1st session	v.307 mo.AUG23-OCT28 yr.1955^{11}
308	4 April 1956 – 10 May 1956	31st Parliament: 2nd session	APR. 4-MAY 10 1956^{11} v.308 mo.APR04-MAY10 yr.1956^{11}
309	7 August 1956 – 12 September 1956	31st Parliament: 2nd session	AUG. 7-SEPT. 12 1956^{11} v.309 mo.AUG07-SEP12 yr.1956^{11}
310	13 September 1956 – 26 October 1956	31st Parliament: 2nd session	v.310 mo.SEP13-OCT26 yr.1956^{11} OCT. 9–26 1956^{11}
311	11 June 1957 – 11 July 1957	31st Parliament: 3rd session	JUNE 11-JULY 11 1957^{11} v.311 mo.JUN11-JUL11 yr.1957^{11}
312	12 July 1957 – 9 August 1957	31st Parliament: 3rd session	JULY 12-AUG. 9 1957^{11} v.312 mo.JUL12-AUG09 yr.1957^{11}
313	13 August 1957 – 18 September 1957	31st Parliament: 3rd session	AUG. 13-SEPT. 18 1957^{11} v.313 mo.AUG13-SEP18 yr.1957^{11}
314	19 September 1957 – 25 October 1957	31st Parliament: 3rd session	SEPT. 19-OCT. 25 1957^{11} v.314 mo.SEP19-OCT25 yr.1957^{11}
315	21 January 1958 – 31 January 1958	32nd Parliament: 1st session	JAN. 21–31 1958^{11} v.315 mo.JAN21-JAN31 yr.1958^{11}
316^{7}	10 June 1958 – 23 July 1958	32nd Parliament: 2nd session	JUNE 10-JULY 23 1958^{11} v.316 mo.JUN10-JUL23 yr.1958^{11}
317	24 July 1958 – 22 August 1958	32nd Parliament: 2nd session	JULY 24-AUG. 22 1958^{11} v.317 mo.JUL24-AUG22 yr.1958^{11}
318	26 August 1958 – 3 October 1958	32nd Parliament: 2nd session	AUG. 26-OCT. 3 1958^{11} v.318 mo.AUG26-OCT03 yr.1958^{11}
319	24 June 1959 – 29 July 1959	32nd Parliament: 3rd session	JUNE 24-JULY 29 1959^{11}
320	30 July 1959 – 9 September 1959	32nd Parliament: 3rd session	JULY 30-SEPT. 9 1959^{11} v.320 mo.JUL30-SEP09 yr.1959^{11}
321	10 September 1959 – 23 October 1959	32nd Parliament: 3rd session	SEPT. 10-OCT. 28 1959^{11} v.321 mo.SEP10-OCT23 yr.1959^{11}
322	22 June 1960 – 26 July 1960	32nd Parliament: 4th session	JUNE 22-JULY 26 1960^{11} v.322 mo.JUN22-JUL26 yr.1960^{11}
323	27 July 1960 – 26 August 1960	32nd Parliament: 4th session	JULY 27-AUG. 26 1960^{11}
324	30 August 1960 – 7 October 1960	32nd Parliament: 4th session	AUG. 30-OCT. 7 1960^{11} v.324 mo.AUG30-OCT07 yr.1960^{11}
325	11 October 1960 – 28 October 1960	32nd Parliament: 4th session	OCT. 11–28 1960^{11} v.325 mo.OCT11-OCT25 yr.1960^{11}
326	20 June 1961 – 1 August 1961	33rd Parliament: 1st session	v.326:2–8 1961^{11} ^{8}
327	2 August 1961 – 5 September 1961	33rd Parliament: 1st session	v.327 mo.AUG02-SEP05 yr.1961^{11}
328	6 September 1961 – 12 October 1961	33rd Parliament: 1st session	v.328 mo.SEP06-OCT12 yr.1961^{11}
329	13 October 1961 – 1 December 1961	33rd Parliament: 1st session	v.329 mo.OCT13-DEC01 yr.1961^{11}
330	7 June 1962 – 25 July 1962	33rd Parliament: 2nd session	v.330 mo.JUN07-JUL25 yr.1962^{11}
331	26 July 1962 – 7 September 1962	33rd Parliament: 2nd session	
332	9 October 1962 – 21 November 1962	33rd Parliament: 2nd session	
333	22 November 1962 – 14 December 1962	33rd Parliament: 2nd session	v.333 mo.NOV22-DEC14 yr.1962^{11}
334	12 February 1963	33rd Parliament: 3rd session	v.334 mo.FEB12 yr.1963^{11}
335	20 June 1963 – 2 August 1963	33rd Parliament: 4th session	v.335 mo.JUN20-AUG02 yr.1963^{11}
336	13 August 1963 – 27 September 1963	33rd Parliament: 4th session	v.336 mo.AUG13-SEP27 yr.1963^{11}
337	1 October 1963 – 25 October 1963	33rd Parliament: 4th session	
338	10 June 1964 – 17 July 1964	34th Parliament: 1st session	
339	4 August 1964 – 15 September 1964	34th Parliament: 1st session	
340	16 September 1964 – 29 October 1964	34th Parliament: 1st session	
341	30 October 1964 – 4 December 1964	34th Parliament: 1st session	
342	27 May 1965 – 8 July 1965	34th Parliament: 2nd session	
343	9 July 1965 – 27 August 1965	34th Parliament: 2nd session	
344	31 August 1965 – 1 October 1965	34th Parliament: 2nd session	
345	5 October 1965 – 1 November 1965	34th Parliament: 2nd session	
346	26 May 1966 – 30 June 1966	34th Parliament: 3rd session	v.346 mo.MAY26-JUN30 yr.1966^{11}
347	1 July 1966 – 16 August 1966	34th Parliament: 3rd session	v.347 mo.JUL01-AUG16 yr.1966^{11}
348	17 August 1966 – 29 September 1966	34th Parliament: 3rd session	v.348 mo.AUG17-SEP29 yr.1966^{11}
349	30 September 1966 – 29 October 1966	34th Parliament: 3rd session	v.349 mo.SEP30-OCT21 yr.1966^{11}
350	26 April 1967 – 1 June 1967	35th Parliament: 1st session	v.350 mo.APR26-JUN01 yr.1967^{11}
351	2 June 1967 – 19 July 1967	35th Parliament: 1st session	JUNE 2-JULY 19 1967^{11} v.351 mo.JUN02-JUL19 yr.1967^{11}
352	20 July 1967 – 13 September 1967	35th Parliament: 1st session	v.352 mo.JUL20-SEP13 yr.1967^{11}
353	14 September 1967 – 2 November 1967	35th Parliament: 1st session	v.353 mo.SEP14-NOV02 yr.1967^{11}
354	3 November 1967 – 24 November 1967	35th Parliament: 1st session	v.354 mo.NOV03-NOV24 yr.1967^{11}
355	26 June 1968 – 30 July 1968	35th Parliament: 2nd session	v.355 mo.JUN26-JUL30 yr.1968^{11}
356	31 July 1968 – 13 September 1968	35th Parliament: 2nd session	v.356 mo.JUL31-SEP13 yr.1968^{11}
357	17 September 1968 – 30 October 1968	35th Parliament: 2nd session	SEPT. 17-OCT. 30 1968^{11} v.357 mo.SEP17-OCT30 yr.1968^{11}
358	31 October 1968 – 4 December 1968	35th Parliament: 2nd session	OCT. 31-DEC. 4 1968^{11} v.358 mo.OCT31-DEC04 yr.1968^{11}
359	5 December 1968 – 19 December 1968	35th Parliament: 2nd session	DEC. 5–19 1968^{11} v.359 mo.DEC05-DEC19 yr.1968^{11}
360	15 May 1969 – 25 June 1969	35th Parliament: 3rd session	v.360 mo.MAY15-JUN25 yr.1969^{11}
361	26 June 1969 – 25 July 1969	35th Parliament: 3rd session	v.361 mo.JUN26-JUL25 yr.1969^{11}
362	5 August 1969 – 9 September 1969	35th Parliament: 3rd session	v.362 mo.AUG05-SEP09 yr.1969^{11}
363	10 September 1969 – 2 October 1969	35th Parliament: 3rd session	v.363 mo.SEP10-OCT02 yr.1969^{11}
364	3 October 1969 – 24 October 1969	35th Parliament: 3rd session	v.364 mo.OCT03-OCT24 yr.1969^{11}
365	12 March 1970 – 24 April 1970	36th Parliament: 1st session	v.365 mo.MAR12-APR24 yr.1970^{11}
366	19 May 1970 – 8 July 1970	36th Parliament: 1st session	v.366 mo.MAY19-JUL08 yr.1970^{11}
367	9 July 1970 – 21 August 1970	36th Parliament: 1st session	v.367 mo.JUL09-AUG21 yr.1970^{11}
368	25 August 1970 – 25 September 1970	36th Parliament: 1st session	v.368 mo.AUG25-SEP25 yr.1970^{11}
369	29 September 1970 – 29 October 1970	36th Parliament: 1st session	v.369 mo.SEP29-OCT29 yr.1970^{11}
370	30 October 1970 – 3 December 1970	36th Parliament: 1st session	v.370 mo.OCT30-DEC03 yr.1970^{11}
371	25 February 1971 – 24 March 1971	36th Parliament: 2nd session	v.371 mo.FEB25-MAR24 yr.1971^{11}
372	9 June 1971 – 7 July 1971	36th Parliament: 2nd session	v.372 mo.JUN09-JUL07 yr.1971^{11}
373	8 July 1971 – 20 August 1971	36th Parliament: 2nd session	v.373 mo.JUL08-AUG20 yr.1971^{11}
374	24 August 1971 – 21 September 1971	36th Parliament: 2nd session	v.374 mo.AUG24-SEP21 yr.1971^{11}
375	22 September 1971 – 28 October 1971	36th Parliament: 2nd session	v.375 mo.SEP22-OCT28 yr.1971^{11}
376	29 October 1971 – 19 November 1971	36th Parliament: 2nd session	v.376 mo.OCT29-NOV19 yr.1971^{11}
377	23 November 1971 – 17 December 1971	36th Parliament: 2nd session	v.377 mo.NOV23-DEC17 yr.1971^{11}
378	7 June 1972 – 6 July 1972	36th Parliament: 3rd session	v.378 mo.JUN07-JUL06 yr.1972^{11}
379	7 July 1972 – 9 August 1972	36th Parliament: 3rd session	v.379 mo.JUL07-AUG09 yr.1972^{11}
380	10 August 1972 – 14 September 1972	36th Parliament: 3rd session	v.380 mo.AUG10-SEP14 yr.1972^{11}
381	15 September 1972 – 20 October 1972	36th Parliament: 3rd session	v.381 mo.SEP15-OCT20 yr.1972^{11}
382	14 February 1973 – 16 March 1973	37th Parliament: 1st session	v.382 mo.FEB14-MAR16 yr.1973^{11}
383	5 June 1973 – 29 June 1973	37th Parliament: 1st session	v.383 mo.JUN05-JUN29 yr.1973^{11}
384	3 July 1973 – 31 July 1973	37th Parliament: 1st session	v.384 mo.JUL03-JUL31 yr.1973^{11}
385	1 August 1973 – 13 September 1973	37th Parliament: 1st session	v.385 mo.AUG01-SEP13 yr.1973^{11}
386	14 September 1973 – 12 October 1973	37th Parliament: 1st session	v.386 mo.SEP14-OCT12 yr.1973^{11}
387	16 October 1973 – 7 November 1973	37th Parliament: 1st session	v.387 yr.1973^{11}
388	8 November 1973 – 23 November 1973	37th Parliament: 1st session	v.388 yr.1973^{11}
389	4 February 1974 – 14 March 1974	37th Parliament: 2nd session	v.389 yr.1974^{11}
390	15 March 1974 – 7 June 1974	37th Parliament: 2nd session	v.390 yr.1974^{11}
391	11 June 1974 – 5 July 1974	36th Parliament: 2nd session	v.391 yr.1974^{11}
392	9 July 1974 – 1 August 1974	37th Parliament: 2nd session	v.392 yr.1974^{11}
393	2 August 1974 – 3 September 1974	37th Parliament: 2nd session	v.393 yr.1974^{11}
394	17 September 1974 – 10 October 1974	37th Parliament: 2nd session	v.394 yr.1974^{11}
395	11 October 1974 – 8 November 1974	37th Parliament: 2nd session	v.395 yr.1974^{11}
396	25 March 1975 – 23 April 1975	37th Parliament: 3rd session	v.396 yr.1975^{11}
397	24 April 1975 – 30 May 1975	37th Parliament: 3rd session	v.397 yr.1975^{11}
398	3 June 1975 – 24 June 1975	37th Parliament: 3rd session	v.398 yr.1975^{11}
399	25 June 1975 – 22 July 1975	37th Parliament: 3rd session	v.399 yr.1975^{11}
400	23 July 1975 – 29 August 1975	37th Parliament: 3rd session	v.400 yr.1975^{11}
401	2 September 1975 – 26 September 1975	37th Parliament: 3rd session	v.401 yr.1975^{11}
402	30 September 1975 – 10 October 1975	37th Parliament: 3rd session	v.402 yr.1975^{11}
403	22 June 1976 – 20 July 1976	38th Parliament: 1st session	v.403 yr.1976^{11}
404	21 July 1976 – 11 August 1976	38th Parliament: 1st session	v.404 yr.1976^{11}
405	12 August 1976 – 7 September 1976	38th Parliament: 1st session	v.405 yr.1976^{11}
406	8 September 1976 – 13 October 1976	38th Parliament: 1st session	v.406 yr.1976^{11}
407	14 October 1976 – 12 November 1976	38th Parliament: 1st session	v.407 yr.1976^{11}
408	16 November 1976 – 14 December 1976	38th Parliament: 1st session	v.408 yr.1976^{11}
409	28 February 1977	38th Parliament: 2nd session	v.409 mo.FEB28 yr.1977^{11}
410	19 May 1977 – 16 June 1977	38th Parliament: 3rd session	v.410 mo.MAY19-JUN16 yr.1977^{11}
411	17 June 1977 – 21 July 1977	38th Parliament: 3rd session	v.411 mo.JUN17-JUL21 yr.1977^{11}
412	22 July 1977 – 19 August 1977	38th Parliament: 3rd session	v.412 mo.JUL22-AUG19 yr.1977^{11}
413	23 August 1977 – 21 September 1977	38th Parliament: 3rd session	v.413 mo.AUG28-SEP21 yr.1977^{11}
414	22 September 1977 – 25 October 1977	38th Parliament: 3rd session	v.414 mo.SEP22-OCT25 yr.1977^{11}
415	26 October 1977 – 22 November 1977	38th Parliament: 3rd session	v.415 mo.OCT26-NOV22 yr.1977^{11}
416	23 November 1977 – 16 December 1977	38th Parliament: 3rd session	v.416 mo.NOV23-DEC16 yr.1977^{11}
417	10 May 1978 – 14 June 1978	38th Parliament: 4th session	
418	15 June 1978 – 12 July 1978	38th Parliament: 4th session	
419	13 July 1978 – 15 August 1978	38th Parliament: 4th session	
420	16 August 1978 – 14 September 1978	38th Parliament: 4th session	
421	15 September 1978 – 6 October 1978	38th Parliament: 4th session	
422	16 May 1979 – 14 June 1979	39th Parliament: 1st session	
423	15 June 1979 – 13 July 1979	39th Parliament: 1st session	
424	17 July 1979 – 15 August 1979	39th Parliament: 1st session	
425	16 August 1979 – 20 September 1979	39th Parliament: 1st session	
426	21 September 1979 – 25 October 1979	39th Parliament: 1st session	
427	26 October 1979 – 6 December 1979	39th Parliament: 1st session	
428	7 December 1979 – 14 December 1979	39th Parliament: 1st session	
429	15 May 1980 – 11 June 1980	39th Parliament: 2nd session	
430	12 June 1980 – 8 July 1980	39th Parliament: 2nd session	
431	9 July 1980 – 30 July 1980	39th Parliament: 2nd session	
432	31 July 1980 – 28 August 1980	39th Parliament: 2nd session	
433	29 August 1980 – 1 October 1980	39th Parliament: 2nd session	
434	2 October 1980 – 5 November 1980	39th Parliament: 2nd session	
435	6 November 1980 – 27 November 1980	39th Parliament: 2nd session	
436	28 November 1980 – 12 December 1980	39th Parliament: 2nd session	
437	28 May 1981 – 23 June 1981	39th Parliament: 3rd session	
438	24 June 1981 – 16 July 1981	39th Parliament: 3rd session	
439	17 July 1981 – 7 August 1981	39th Parliament: 3rd session	
440	11 August 1981 – 9 September 1981	39th Parliament: 3rd session	
441	10 September 1981 – 9 October 1981	39th Parliament: 3rd session	
442	13 October 1981 – 23 October 1981	39th Parliament: 3rd session	
443	6 April 1982 – 4 May 1982	40th Parliament: 1st session	
444	5 May 1982 – 30 July 1982	40th Parliament: 1st session	
445	3 August 1982 – 20 August 1982	40th Parliament: 1st session	
446	24 August 1982 – 16 September 1982	40th Parliament: 1st session	
447	17 September 1982 – 15 October 1982	40th Parliament: 1st session	
448	19 October 1982 – 26 November 1982	40th Parliament: 1st session	
449	30 November 1982 – 17 December 1982	40th Parliament: 1st session	
450	7 April 1983 – 4 May 1983	40th Parliament: 2nd session	
451	31 May 1983 – 18 August 1983	40th Parliament: 2nd session	
452	19 August 1983 – 14 September 1983	40th Parliament: 2nd session	
453	15 September 1983 – 20 October 1983	40th Parliament: 2nd session	
454	21 October 1983 – 18 November 1983	40th Parliament: 2nd session	
455	22 November 1983 – 16 December 1983	40th Parliament: 2nd session	
456	31 May 1984 – 14 June 1984	40th Parliament: 3rd session	
457	15 August 1984 – 3 October 1984	41st Parliament: 1st session	
458	4 October 1984 – 8 November 1984	41st Parliament: 1st session	
459	13 November 1984 – 5 December 1984	41st Parliament: 1st session	
460	6 December 1984 – 20 February 1985	41st Parliament: 1st session	
461	21 February 1985 – 21 March 1985	41st Parliament: 1st session	
462	22 March 1985 – 7 June 1985	41st Parliament: 1st session	
463	11 June 1985 – 11 July 1985	41st Parliament: 1st session	
464	12 July 1985 – 26 July 1985	41st Parliament: 1st session	
465	6 August 1985 – 12 September 1985	41st Parliament: 1st session	
466	17 September 1985 – 23 October 1985	41st Parliament: 1st session	
467	24 October 1985 – 21 November 1985	41st Parliament: 1st session	
468	26 November 1985 – 12 December 1985	41st Parliament: 1st session	
469	26 February 1986 – 26 March 1986	41st Parliament: 2nd session	
470	8 April 1986 – 29 April 1986	41st Parliament: 2nd session	
471	27 May 1986 – 19 June 1986	41st Parliament: 2nd session	
472	1 July 1986 – 17 July 1986	41st Parliament: 2nd session	
473	29 July 1986 – 14 August 1986	41st Parliament: 2nd session	
474	9 September 1986 – 2 October 1986	41st Parliament: 2nd session	
475	14 October 1986 – 26 November 1986	41st Parliament: 2nd session	
476	27 November 1986 – 11 December 1986	41st Parliament: 2nd session	
477	16 December 1986 – 12 February 1987	41st Parliament: 2nd session	
478	17 February 1987 – 12 March 1987	41st Parliament: 2nd session	
479	17 March 1987 – 9 April 1987	41st Parliament: 2nd session	
480	28 April 1987 – 4 June 1987	41st Parliament: 2nd session	
481	9 June 1987 – 24 June 1987	41st Parliament: 2nd session	
482	30 June 1987 – 21 July 1987	41st Parliament: 2nd session	
483	16 September 1987 – 15 October 1987	42nd Parliament: 1st session	
484	20 October 1987 – 26 November 1987	42nd Parliament: 1st session	
485	1 December 1987 – 8 December 1987	42nd Parliament: 1st session	
486	16 February 1988 – 3 March 1988	42nd Parliament: 1st session	
487	15 March 1988 – 29 March 1988	42nd Parliament: 1st session	
488	19 April 1988 – 5 May 1988	42nd Parliament: 1st session	
489	7 June 1988 – 30 June 1988	42nd Parliament: 1st session	
490	12 July 1988 – 28 July 1988	42nd Parliament: 1st session	
491	9 August 1988 – 25 August 1988	42nd Parliament: 1st session	
492	6 September 1988 – 6 October 1988	42nd Parliament: 1st session	
493	11 October 1988 – 10 November 1988	42nd Parliament: 1st session	
494	15 November 1988 – 24 November 1988	42nd Parliament: 1st session	
495	6 December 1988 – 13 December 1988	42nd Parliament: 1st session	
496	21 February 1989 – 21 March 1989	42nd Parliament: 1st session	
497	11 April 1989 – 4 May 1989	42nd Parliament: 1st session	
498	16 May 1989 – 1 June 1989	42nd Parliament: 1st session	
499	11 July 1989 – 27 July 1989	42nd Parliament: 1st session	
500	8 August 1989 – 24 August 1989	42nd Parliament: 1st session	
501	5 September 1989 – 21 September 1989	42nd Parliament: 1st session	
502	3 October 1989 – 16 November 1989	42nd Parliament: 1st session	
503	21 November 1989 – 5 December 1989	42nd Parliament: 1st session	
504	12 December 1989 – 12 December 1989	42nd Parliament: 1st session	
505	14 February 1990 – 15 March 1990	42nd Parliament: 2nd session	
506	20 March 1990 – 11 April 1990	42nd Parliament: 2nd session	
507	15 May 1990 – 14 June 1990	42nd Parliament: 2nd session	
508	19 June 1990 – 28 June 1990	42nd Parliament: 2nd session	
509	10 July 1990 – 9 August 1990	42nd Parliament: 2nd session	
510	14 August 1990 – 6 September 1990	42nd Parliament: 2nd session	
511	28 November 1990 – 19 December 1990	43rd Parliament: 1st session	
512	22 January 1991 – 6 March 1991	43rd Parliament: 2nd session	
513	12 March 1991 – 11 April 1991	43rd Parliament: 2nd session	
514	16 April 1991 – 9 May 1991	43rd Parliament: 2nd session	
515	28 May 1991 – 13 June 1991	43rd Parliament: 2nd session	
516	18 June 1991 – 4 July 1991	43rd Parliament: 2nd session	
517	23 July 1991 – 30 July 1991	43rd Parliament: 2nd session	
518	5 August 1991 – 22 August 1991	43rd Parliament: 2nd session	
519	24 September 1991 – 17 October 1991	43rd Parliament: 2nd session	
520	22 October 1991 – 21 November 1991	43rd Parliament: 2nd session	
521	26 November 1991 – 17 December 1991	43rd Parliament: 2nd session	
522	3 March 1992 – 19 March 1992	43rd Parliament: 2nd session	
523	24 March 1992 – 9 April 1992	43rd Parliament: 2nd session	
524	22 April 1992 – 7 May 1992	43rd Parliament: 2nd session	
525	2 June 1992 – 18 June 1992	43rd Parliament: 2nd session	
526	23 June 1992 – 2 July 1992	43rd Parliament: 2nd session	
527	21 July 1992 – 30 July 1992	43rd Parliament: 2nd session	
528	4 August 1992 – 20 August 1992	43rd Parliament: 2nd session	
529	15 September 1992 – 1 October 1992	43rd Parliament: 2nd session	
530	6 October 1992 – 22 October 1992	43rd Parliament: 2nd session	
531	10 November 1992 – 26 November 1992	43rd Parliament: 2nd session	
532	1 December 1992 – 17 December 1992	43rd Parliament: 2nd session	
533	23 February 1993 – 18 March 1993	43rd Parliament: 2nd session	
534	23 March 1993 – 27 April 1993	43rd Parliament: 2nd session	
535	4 May 1993 – 17 June 1993	43rd Parliament: 2nd session	
536	22 June 1993 – 22 July 1993	43rd Parliament: 2nd session	
537	27 July 1993 – 19 August 1993	43rd Parliament: 2nd session	
538	7 September 1993 – 23 September 1993	43rd Parliament: 2nd session	
539	21 December 1993 – 29 March 1994	44th Parliament: 1st session	
540	24 May 1994 – 16 June 1994	44th Parliament: 1st session	
541	21 June 1994 – 14 July 1994	44th Parliament: 1st session	
542	23 August 1994 – 15 September 1994	44th Parliament: 1st session	
543	27 September 1994 – 20 October 1994	44th Parliament: 1st session	
544	8 November 1994 – 24 November 1994	44th Parliament: 1st session	
545	29 November 1994 – 8 December 1994	44th Parliament: 1st session	
546	28 February 1995 – 23 March 1995	44th Parliament: 1st session	
547	28 March 1995 – 8 June 1995	44th Parliament: 1st session	
548	13 June 1995 – 20 July 1995	44th Parliament: 1st session	
549	25 July 1995 – 17 August 1995	44th Parliament: 1st session	
550	12 September 1995 – 5 October 1995	44th Parliament: 1st session	
551	10 October 1995 – 30 November 1995	44th Parliament: 1st session	
552	5 December 1995 – 19 December 1995	44th Parliament: 1st session	
553	20 February 1996 – 21 March 1996	44th Parliament: 1st session	
554	26 March 1996 – 2 May 1996	44th Parliament: 1st session	
555	7 May 1996 – 13 June 1996	44th Parliament: 1st session	
556	18 June 1996 – 25 July 1996	44th Parliament: 1st session	
557	30 July 1996 – 27 August 1996	44th Parliament: 1st session	
558	12 December 1996 – 6 March 1997	45th Parliament: 1st session	
559	11 March 1997 – 1 May 1997	45th Parliament: 1st session	
560	6 May 1997 – 12 June 1997	45th Parliament: 1st session	
561	17 June 1997 – 10 July 1997	45th Parliament: 1st session	
562	22 July 1997 – 14 August 1997	45th Parliament: 1st session	
563	2 September 1997 – 25 September 1997	45th Parliament: 1st session	
564	14 October 1997 – 13 November 1997	45th Parliament: 1st session	
565	18 November 1997 – 9 December 1997	45th Parliament: 1st session	
566	17 February 1998 – 10 March 1998	45th Parliament: 1st session	
567	17 March 1998 – 7 May 1998	45th Parliament: 1st session	
568	12 May 1998 – 28 May 1998	45th Parliament: 1st session	
569	16 June 1998 – 30 June 1998	45th Parliament: 1st session	
570	21 July 1998 – 13 August 1998	45th Parliament: 1st session	
571	18 August 1998 – 17 September 1998	45th Parliament: 1st session	
572	22 September 1998 – 5 November 1998	45th Parliament: 1st session	
573	10 November 1998 – 24 November 1998	45th Parliament: 1st session	
574	1 December 1998 – 17 December 1998	45th Parliament: 1st session	
575	16 February 1999 – 18 March 1999	45th Parliament: 1st session	
576	23 March 1999 – 29 April 1999	45th Parliament: 1st session	
577	4 May 1999 – 27 May 1999	45th Parliament: 1st session	
578	1 June 1999 – 1 July 1999	45th Parliament: 1st session	
579	13 July 1999 – 26 August 1999	45th Parliament: 1st session	
580	31 August 1999 – 5 October 1999	45th Parliament: 1st session	
581	20 December 1999 – 24 February 2000	46th Parliament: 1st session	
582	29 February 2000 – 30 March 2000	46th Parliament: 1st session	
583	4 April 2000 – 18 May 2000	46th Parliament: 1st session	
584	23 May 2000 – 22 June 2000	46th Parliament: 1st session	
585	27 June 2000 – 3 August 2000	46th Parliament: 1st session	
586	8 August 2000 – 24 August 2000	46th Parliament: 1st session	
587	5 September 2000 – 5 October 2000	46th Parliament: 1st session	
588	10 October 2000 – 23 November 2000	46th Parliament: 1st session	
589	28 November 2000 – 13 December 2000	46th Parliament: 1st session	
590	13 February 2001 – 15 March 2001	46th Parliament: 1st session	
591	20 March 2001 – 3 May 2001	46th Parliament: 1st session	
592	8 May 2001 – 14 June 2001	46th Parliament: 1st session	
593	19 June 2001 – 2 August 2001	46th Parliament: 1st session	
594	7 August 2001 – 6 September 2001	46th Parliament: 1st session	
595	11 September 2001 – 10 October 2001	46th Parliament: 1st session	
596	16 October 2001 – 15 November 2001	46th Parliament: 1st session	
597	27 November 2001 – 18 December 2001	46th Parliament: 1st session	
598	12 February 2002 – 14 March 2002	46th Parliament: 1st session	
599	19 March 2002 – 24 April 2002	46th Parliament: 1st session	
600	30 April 2002 – 23 May 2002	46th Parliament: 1st session	
601	28 May 2002 – 11 June 2002	46th Parliament: 1st session	
602	26 August 2002 – 19 September 2002	47th Parliament: 1st session	
603	1 October 2002 – 7 November 2002	47th Parliament: 1st session	
604	12 November 2002 – 5 December 2002	47th Parliament: 1st session	
605	10 December 2002 – 17 December 2002	47th Parliament: 1st session	
606	11 February 2003 – 6 March 2003	47th Parliament: 1st session	
607	18 March 2003 – 10 April 2003	47th Parliament: 1st session	
608	29 April 2003 – 22 May 2003	47th Parliament: 1st session	
609	10 June 2003 – 1 July 2003	47th Parliament: 1st session	
610	22 July 2003 – 14 August 2003	47th Parliament: 1st session	
611	26 August 2003 – 18 September 2003	47th Parliament: 1st session	
612	8 October 2003 – 21 October 2003	47th Parliament: 1st session	
613	4 November 2003 – 20 November 2003	47th Parliament: 1st session	
614	2 December 2003 – 16 December 2003	47th Parliament: 1st session	
615	10 February 2004 – 4 March 2004	47th Parliament: 1st session	
616	16 March 2004 – 8 April 2004	47th Parliament: 1st session	
617	4 May 2004 – 27 May 2004	47th Parliament: 1st session	
618	15 June 2004 – 29 July 2004	47th Parliament: 1st session	
619	3 August 2004 – 2 September 2004	47th Parliament: 1st session	
620	7 September 2004 – 14 October 2004	47th Parliament: 1st session	
621	19 October 2004 – 16 September 2004	47th Parliament: 1st session	
622	30 November 2004 – 14 December 2004	47th Parliament: 1st session	
623	1 March 2005 – 3 March 2005	47th Parliament: 1st session	
624	8 March 2005 – 7 April 2005	47th Parliament: 1st session	
625	12 April 2005 – 19 May 2005	47th Parliament: 1st session	
626	31 May 2005 – 14 June 2005	47th Parliament: 1st session	
627	21 June 2005 – 2 August 2005	47th Parliament: 1st session	
628	7 November 2005 – 13 December 2005	48th Parliament: 1st session	
629	14 February 2006 – 16 March 2006	48th Parliament: 1st session	
630	21 March 2006 – 4 May 2006	48th Parliament: 1st session	
631	9 May 2006 – 15 June 2006	48th Parliament: 1st session	
632	20 June 2006 – 27 July 2006	48th Parliament: 1st session	
633	1 August 2006 – 7 September 2006	48th Parliament: 1st session	
634	12 September 2006 – 26 October 2006	48th Parliament: 1st session	
635	7 November 2006 – 23 November 2006	48th Parliament: 1st session	
636	5 December 2006 – 12 December 2006	48th Parliament: 1st session	
637	13 February 2007 – 15 March 2007	48th Parliament: 1st session	
638	20 March 2007 – 3 May 2007	48th Parliament: 1st session	
639	8 May 2007 – 14 June 2007	48th Parliament: 1st session	
640	19 June 2007 – 26 July 2007	48th Parliament: 1st session	
641	7 August 2007 – 6 September 2007	48th Parliament: 1st session	
642	11 September 2007 – 18 October 2007	48th Parliament: 1st session	
643	23 October 2007 – 22 November 2007	48th Parliament: 1st session	
644	4 December 2007 – 18 December 2007	48th Parliament: 1st session	
645	12 February 2008 – 13 March 2008	48th Parliament: 1st session	
646	18 March 2008 – 17 April 2008	48th Parliament: 1st session	
647	13 May 2008 – 19 June 2008	48th Parliament: 1st session	
648	24 June 2008 – 31 July 2008	48th Parliament: 1st session	
649	5 August 2008 – 2 September 2008	48th Parliament: 1st session	
650	9 September 2008 – 23 September 2008	48th Parliament: 1st session	
651	8 December 2008 – 16 December 2008	49th Parliament: 1st session	
652	10 February 2009 – 12 March 2009	49th Parliament: 1st session	
653	24 March 2009 – 30 April 2009	49th Parliament: 1st session	
654	5 May 2009 – 4 June 2009	49th Parliament: 1st session	
655	2 June 2009 – 2 July 2009	49th Parliament: 1st session	
656	21 July 2009 – 20 August 2009	49th Parliament: 1st session	
657	25 August 2009 – 24 September 2009	49th Parliament: 1st session	
658	13 October 2009 – 29 October 2009	49th Parliament: 1st session	
659	17 November 2009 – 16 December 2009	49th Parliament: 1st session	
660	9 February 2010 – 23 February 2010	49th Parliament: 1st session	
661	16 March 2010 – 30 March 2010	49th Parliament: 1st session	
662	20 April 2010 – 6 May 2010	49th Parliament: 1st session	
663	18 May 2010 – 3 June 2010	49th Parliament: 1st session	
664	15 June 2010 – 1 July 2010	49th Parliament: 1st session	
665	20 July 2010 – 19 August 2010	49th Parliament: 1st session	
666	24 August 2010 – 16 September 2010	49th Parliament: 1st session	
667	21 September 2010 – 21 October 2010	49th Parliament: 1st session	
668	26 October 2010 – 16 November 2010	49th Parliament: 1st session	
669	23 November 2010 – 15 December 2010	49th Parliament: 1st session	
670	8 February 2011 – 17 March 2011	49th Parliament: 1st session	
671	22 March 2011 – 12 April 2011	49th Parliament: 1st session	
672	3 May 2011 – 19 May 2011	49th Parliament: 1st session	
673	7 June 2011 – 7 July 2011	49th Parliament: 1st session	
674	12 July 2011 – 11 August 2011	49th Parliament: 1st session	
675	16 August 2011 – 15 September 2011	49th Parliament: 1st session	
676	27 September 2011 – 6 October 2011	49th Parliament: 1st session	
677	20 December 2011 – 1 March 2012	50th Parliament: 1st session	
678	6 March 2012 – 29 March 2012	50th Parliament: 1st session	
679	3 April 2012 – 10 May 2012	50th Parliament: 1st session	
680	22 May 2012 – 14 June 2012	50th Parliament: 1st session	
681	19 June 2012 – 19 July 2012	50th Parliament: 1st session	
682	24 July 2012 – 16 August 2012	50th Parliament: 1st session	
683	21 August 2012 – 13 September 2012	50th Parliament: 1st session	
684	18 September 2012 – 18 October 2012	50th Parliament: 1st session	
685	23 October 2012 – 15 November 2012	50th Parliament: 1st session	
686	27 November 2012 – 12 December 2012	50th Parliament: 1st session	
687	29 January 2013 – 28 February 2013	50th Parliament: 1st session	
688	12 March 2013 – 28 March 2013	50th Parliament: 1st session	
689	9 April 2013 – 8 May 2013	50th Parliament	
690	14 May 2013 – 6 June 2013	50th Parliament	
691	11 June 2013 – 2 July 2013	50th Parliament	
692	9 July 2013 – 22 August 2013	50th Parliament	
693	27 August 2013 – 26 September 2013	50th Parliament	
694	15 October 2013 – 14 November 2013	50th Parliament	
695	19 November 2013 – 11 December 2013	50th Parliament	
696	28 January 2014 – 6 March 2014	50th Parliament	
697	11 March 2014 – 10 April 2014	50th Parliament	
698	15 April 2014 – 15 May 2014	50th Parliament	
699	20 May 2014 – 26 June 2014	50th Parliament	
700	1 July 2014 – 31 July 2014	50th Parliament	
701	20 October 2014 – 6 November 2014	51st Parliament	
702	25 November 2014 – 10 December 2014	51st Parliament	
703	10 February 2015 – 12 March 2015	51st Parliament	
704	17 March 2015 – 30 April 2015	51st Parliament	
705	5 May 2015 – 28 May 2015	51st Parliament	
706	2 June 2015 – 2 July 2015	51st Parliament	
707	21 July 2015 – 20 August 2015	51st Parliament	
708	25 August 2015 – 17 September 2015	51st Parliament	
709	22 September 2015 – 5 November 2015	51st Parliament	
710	10 November 2015 – 9 December 2015	51st Parliament	
711	9 February 2016 – 10 March 2016	51st Parliament	
712	15 March 2016 – 7 April 2016	51st Parliament	
713	12 April 2016 – 12 May 2016	51st Parliament	
714	24 May 2016 – 9 June 2016	51st Parliament	
715+	14 June 2016 onwards	49th week of the 51st Parliament onwards	

Volume notes

^{1}1854–1866 volumes were compiled by Maurice FitzGerald in 1885 from earlier newspaper reports.

^{2} In 1867 the first official New Zealand Hansard was compiled by reporters employed on a sessional basis.

^{3} Volume 1.2 includes an appendix of financial data for various years.

^{4} Volume 146 includes a 61-page appendix: Proceedings of the meetings of both Houses (held 7 June 1909) to discuss the question of representation of NZ at the Imperial Naval Conference.

^{7} Volume 316 is the first volume to use the title Parliamentary Debates (Hansard).

^{8} This digitised volume 326 is missing pages 1 to 128 (20 to 28 June 1961).

^{9} Volume digitized in partnership with the University of Chicago.

^{10} Volume digitized in partnership with Harvard University.

^{11} Volume digitized in partnership with the University of California (Los Angeles et al. libraries).

^{12} Volume digitized in partnership with the University of Illinois at Urbana–Champaign.

^{13} Volume digitized in partnership with the University of Michigan.
