= C. C. N. Barron =

Reporter (1834–1911)

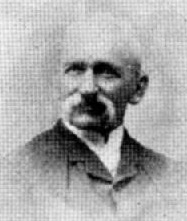

Chief Reporter New Zealand Parliament
- In office 9 July 1867 – June 1896
- Preceded by: new office
- Succeeded by: J. Grattan Grey

Personal details
- Born: Clarke Charles Netterville Barron; 20 August 1834 Waterford, Ireland
- Died: 10 July 1911 (aged 76) Wellington, New Zealand
- Spouse: Augusta Jessie Curtiss
- Children: 6

Clarke Charles Netterville Barron (20 August 1834 – 10 July 1911) was the chief reporter of Parliamentary Debates (Hansard) for the New Zealand Parliament for 29 years from 1867. He established the first team of Hansard reporters in New Zealand and set up systems for recording and publishing debates. He was also responsible for the first published compilation of New Zealand Speakers' Rulings and he was secretary to the Board of Civil Service Examiners for many years.

== Early life ==
Barron was born in Waterford, descending from Irish nobility of County Waterford. He was educated in Ireland and Europe and served as an interpreter during the Crimean War. He is reported to have worked as a purser for the Peninsular and Oriental Steam Navigation Company and the Royal Indian Navy, before arriving in Australia.

On 5 September 1861, in Balmain Sydney, Barron married Augusta Jessie, daughter of W.B. Curtiss. He settled in Goulburn, New South Wales, where he worked as an accountant for the Bank of New South Wales. On 27 September 1862, three months after the birth of his first daughter Mabel, he was arrested and charged with embezzlement from his employer. He pleaded guilty to stealing 200 pounds and was sentenced to two years' imprisonment with hard labour. In passing sentence the judge noted that Barron had committed "nine or ten different acts of forgery by altering the books".

Barron is reported to have arrived in Auckland in 1864, where he found work as a reporter and editor with the New Zealander newspaper. In 1866, he moved to Wellington to become the editor of the New Zealand Advertiser.

== Parliamentary career ==
In 1867, Barron was engaged by the New Zealand Parliament to establish a team of reporters and systems for recording and printing parliamentary debates in both Houses of Parliament. The team was initially established as an experiment and there were many who thought that the trial would be unsuccessful. However, the trial proved to be a success and Barron remained Chief Reporter for 29 years, until his retirement in 1896 at 62 years of age. On the 21st anniversary of the establishment of the NZ Hansard team The Evening Post said of Barron:

"The experience of 21 years has fully confirmed the wisdom of Sir Edward Stafford's choice of a chief for the new venture, and whatever faults may now be found with Hansard, they are certainly not due to any laches or want of skill on Mr. Barron's part. He has filled a difficult and arduous office with conspicuous ability, and if Hansard of today is not the reliable record of Parliamentary utterances which it should be, the fault is not his, but that of the powers by whom his action has been controlled and his authority curtailed."

Barron was employed by the New Zealand Parliament throughout the year, rather than only when the Parliament was in session. When he was not occupied with Hansard business he would assist in other roles, such as translation of documents. In 1868, Barron was appointed by the Colonial Secretary as acting Secretary to the Central Civil Service Examination Board, and, in 1870, it was reported that he was "appointed a member of the Local Board of Examiners at Wellington, under the Civil Service Act, 1866", In 1873, he was formally appointed Secretary to the Civil Service Examination Board, an office he held for many years.

In 1889, Barron compiled from the New Zealand Hansard reports the publication Decisions of the Speakers of the House of Representatives on points of order, rules of debate, and general practice of the House, 1867 to 1888. An updated version was published in 1900 as Rulings of the Speakers of the House of Representatives: also of the chairmen of committees, on matters arising in committee; 1867 to 1899 inclusive and this was updated again, in 1905 and 1911.

When Barron reached his fifties his health meant that he was unable to take as many turns reporting debates, concentrating instead on editing the work of other reporters. This created some friction among his staff and, in 1895, Barron was criticized in the House by Premier Richard Seddon due to complaints about the length of time it was taking for debates to be published. The Reporting Debates and Printing Committee undertook a thorough review of the Hansard staffing. William Steward, speaking on behalf of the Committee reported to the House that Barron was "thoroughly competent to retain charge, and has the confidence and esteem of the reporters... discharging his duties with perfect efficiency, not merely as reporter, but as editor of Hansard for the last three or four years."

Despite retaining the confidence of the Reporting Debates and Printing Committee, Barron was forced by the Seddon government to retire in June 1896. Seddon refused Barron the pension normally available to civil servants on the grounds that, as an officer of Parliament, he was not eligible. Barron petitioned Parliament and, after considerable debate, he was eventually awarded 1,500 pounds (2.5 years' salary) as compensation for loss of office.

== Other interests ==
During the late 1860s Barren served with the Wellington Rifle Volunteers of the Wellington Militia, where he earned the rank of ensign and was a marksman.

In 1886 Barron became a founding member of the Council of New Zealand Shorthand Writers' Association.

In 1887 Barron was part of a small group (that included Charles Abraham the Bishop of Wellington, Isaac Featherston the Superintendent of Wellington, Coutts Crawford, Jonas Woodward, Robert Hart, Charles Johnson Pharazyn and his sons Robert and Charles) who drew up the Rules of the New Zealand Society, Reconstituted, November 1867. This group became the Wellington Philosophical Society, a branch of the Royal Society of New Zealand.

Barron and his wife were life members of the Thorndon Tennis Club.

Barron's grandson John Netterville Barron (1911–1992) was an eminent plastic surgeon who performed reconstructive surgery on servicemen during World War II and after the war worked with Harold Gillies at Park Prewett Hospital.

The Barron family lived in Hobson Street Thorndon for many years, before building a house at 187 Thorndon Quay.

== Death ==
Barron died at the age of 76 on 10 July 1911. The death occurred at his residence in Thorndon Wellington. He and his wife Augusta (30 December 1840 – 30 December 1920) were both cremated at the Wellington City Council crematorium. Obituaries appeared in numerous papers.
