= 1935 Lyttelton by-election =

New Zealand by-election

- 24 July 1935

The Lyttelton seat in the House of Representatives. Election by simple majority using first-past-the-post voting.
- Turnout: 67.43%
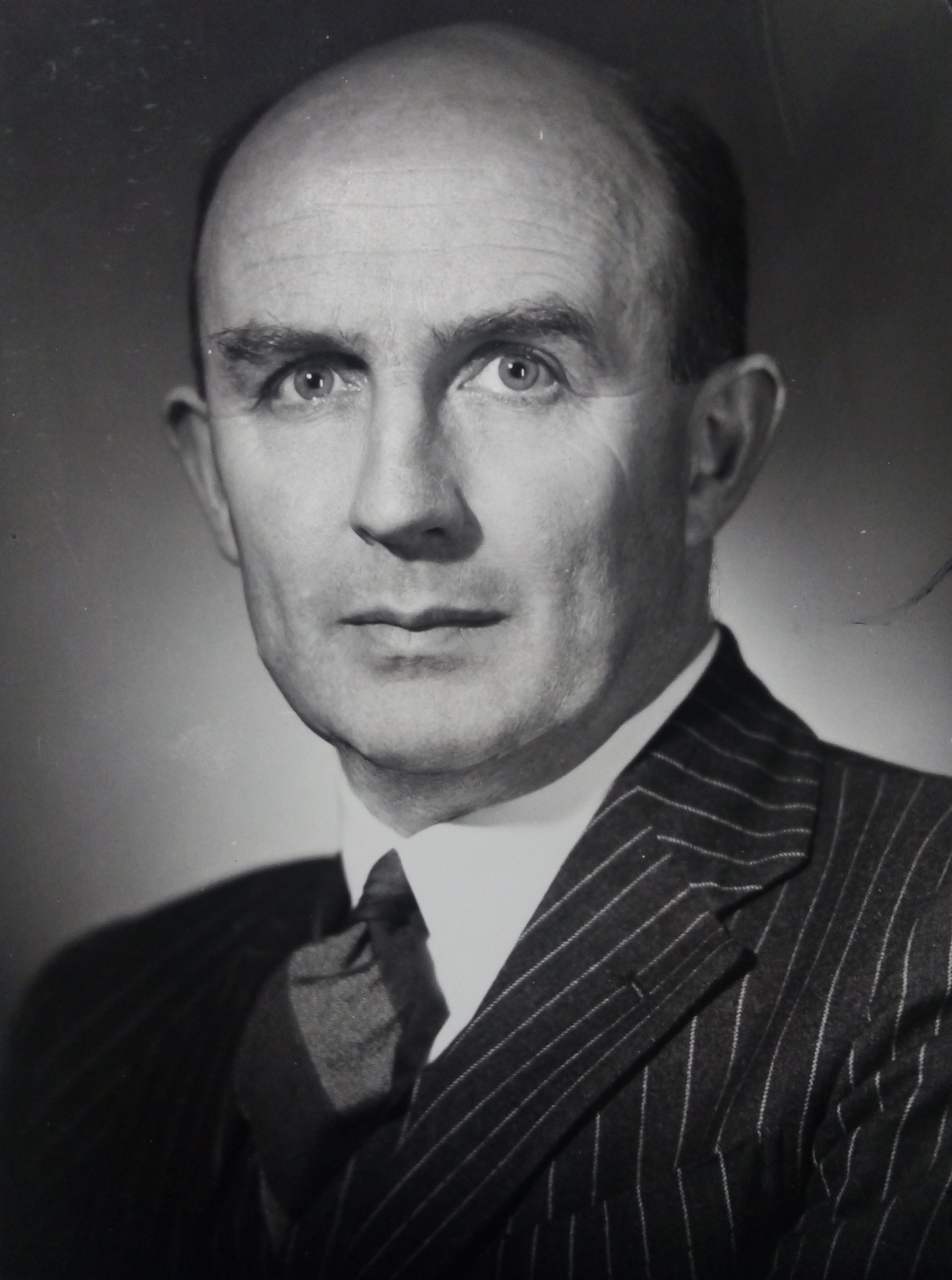

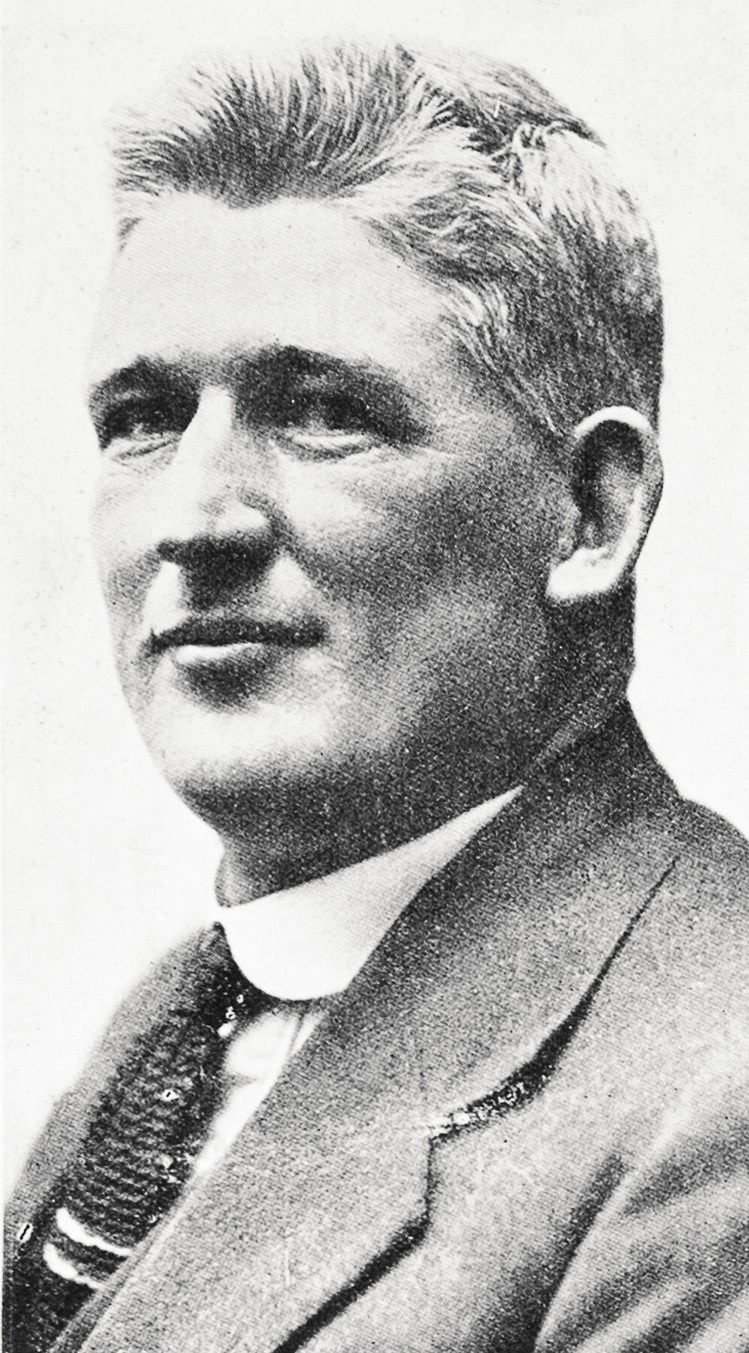
Candidate	Terry McCombs	Melville Lyons
Party	Labour	United/Reform
Popular vote	5,437	3,685
Percentage	58.65%	39.75%
Member before election
Elizabeth McCombs
Labour
Elected Member
Terry McCombs
Labour

The 1935 Lyttelton by-election was a by-election held on 24 July 1935 during the 24th New Zealand Parliament in the Lyttelton electorate. The electorate was won by Terry McCombs of the New Zealand Labour Party, succeeding his mother.

== Selection process ==
Terrence McCombs's mother, Elizabeth McCombs had held the seat after winning it in a by-election in 1933. She died on 7 June 1935 after succumbing to illness.

The New Zealand Labour Party chose Terrence McCombs to stand for them. This was in some ways a surprise as many expected that Jim Thorn would be the candidate.

The United-Reform Coalition who were operating under the name "National Political Federation" selected Melville Lyons as their candidate. Lyons had a rural background as he was secretary of the New Zealand Sheepbreeders' Association at the time. In the 1925 New Zealand general election he had stood for the New Zealand Reform Party in 1925 in Lyttelton against James McCombs. He was declared the winner with a victory of eight votes but the election court overturned this and McCombs won by just one vote.

The New Zealand Democrat Party's leader Albert Davy declined to stand a candidate in the by-election. He believed that the by-election was a waste of money given the close proximity to the 1935 general election.

Other candidates who chose to stand included Edward Hills and G.S Hamilton.

== Results ==
Results of the by-election held on 13 September 1933 were:

1933 Lyttelton by-election
Party	Candidate	Votes	%	±%
Labour	Elizabeth McCombs	6,344	61.66	11.89
United/Reform	Frederick Freeman	3,675	35.72	−13.76
Independent Labour	Edward Hills	269	2.61	
Majority		2,669	25.94	+25.65
Turnout		10,288	74.98	

Results of the by-election held on 24 July 1935 were:

1935 Lyttelton by-election
Party	Candidate	Votes	%	±%
Labour	Terry McCombs	5,437	58.65	
United/Reform	Melville Lyons	3,685	39.75	
Independent Labour	Edward Hills	103	1.11	
Independent	G.S. Hamilton	46	0.50	
Majority		1752	18.9	−6.75
Turnout		9,271	67.43	

== Outcome ==
McCombs extended his majority to 2,645 at the general election later that year and held the seat until 1951. This meant that his family held the seat for 38 years ever since his father's win in the Lyttelton by-election of 1913.
