= 1933 Lyttelton by-election =

New Zealand by-election

- 13 September 1933

The Lyttelton seat in the House of Representatives. Election by simple majority using first-past-the-post voting.
- Turnout: 74.98%
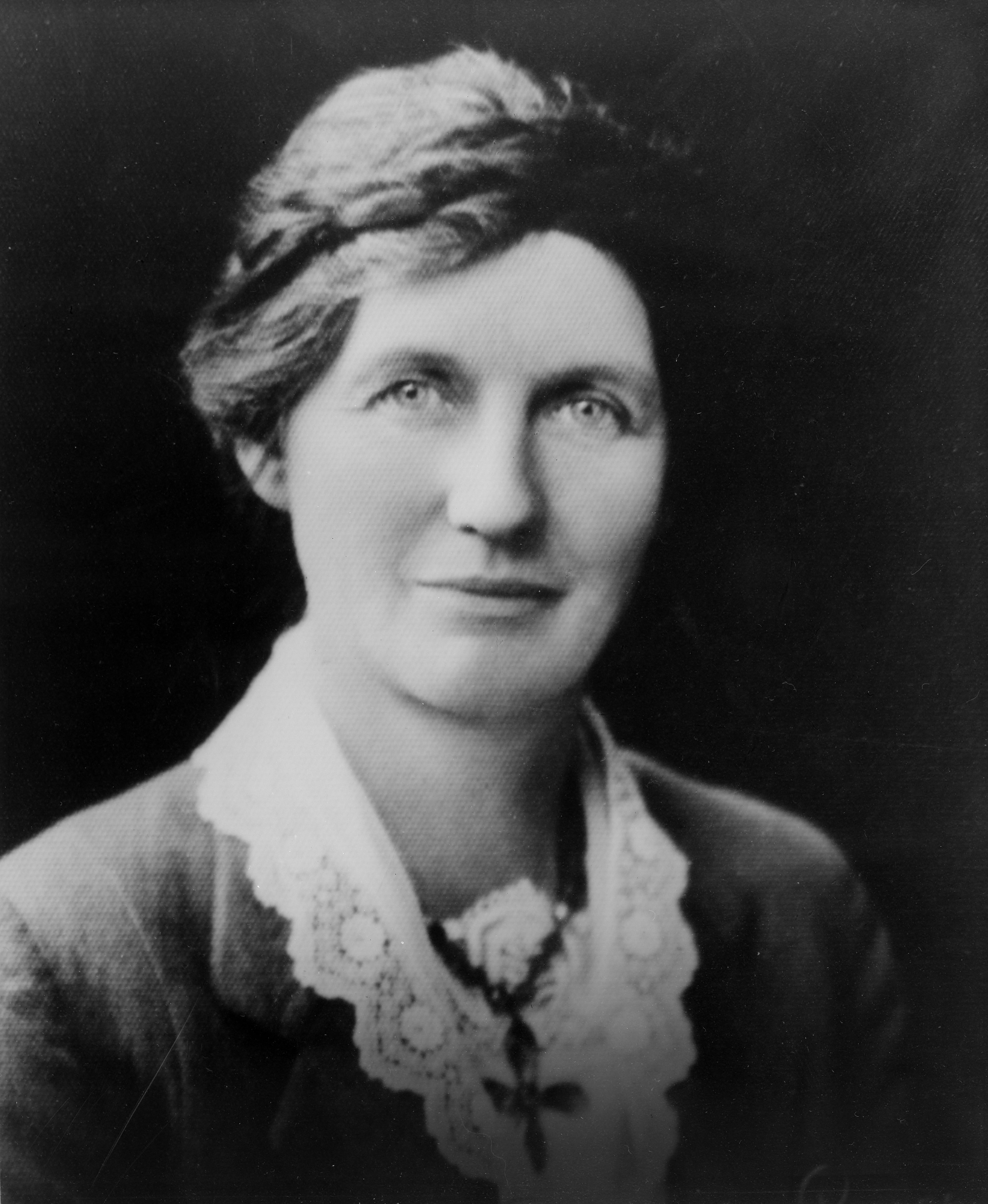

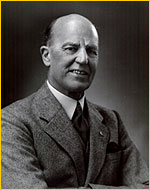
Candidate	Elizabeth McCombs	Frederick W. Freeman
Party	Labour	United/Reform
Popular vote	6,344	3,675
Percentage	61.66%	35.72%
Swing	11.89%	-13.76%
Member before election
James McCombs
Labour
Elected Member
Elizabeth McCombs
Labour

The Lyttelton by-election of 1933 was a by-election held during the 24th New Zealand Parliament in the Christchurch electorate of Lyttelton. It is notable for being won by Elizabeth McCombs of the New Zealand Labour Party, who became the first woman to be elected to the New Zealand Parliament. This by-election was therefore seen as a milestone in Women's suffrage in New Zealand.

== Cause of by-election ==
This by-election came about because of the death of James McCombs who was Elizabeth McCombs's husband. He had held the electorate of Lyttelton since he won it in the Lyttelton by-election of 1913. He was therefore one of the earliest members of the Labour party to hold an electorate. He died of a heart attack on 2 August 1933.

== Candidates and selection process ==
=== Labour Party ===
Despite the electorate of Lyttelton being held by Labour or its predecessor the Social Democrats since 1913, the electorate was seen as marginal as it had been won by just 32 votes at the 1931 general election. However, the Labour Party were confident of retaining the electorate as they pledged reforms that would help those affected by the Great Depression. The Labour party chose to select Elizabeth McCombs who had previously been elected to the Christchurch City Council in 1921 and had stood for Labour in Kaiapoi and then Christchurch North in the 1928 and the 1931 respectively. McCombs was unanimously selected as the Labour party candidate. Nine other women had stood for parliament in New Zealand since they had been allowed to in 1919, while women gained the right to vote in 1893. It was not uncommon for family members to take over parliamentary electorates upon the death of a family member. For example, Vincent Ward had taken over from his father Joseph in the Invercargill electorate in 1930.

=== Coalition Government ===
The United and Reform parties were at this stage in a coalition. The Christchurch executives unanimously suggested that Frederick W. Freeman be accepted as their candidate. He had already been the Reform party candidate in the 1931 general election, losing by just 32 votes against James McCombs. Minister of Finance and Acting Prime Minister Gordon Coates as leader of Reform, and the Minister of Lands, Alfred Ransom, on behalf of United, accepted the recommendation on behalf of the coalition and endorsed Freeman's selection.

Freeman was born in Christchurch in 1881 and educated locally. After a term of legal work, he trained as a surveyor and later became a civil engineer. He was a commissioner of the Waimakariri River Trust and an elected member of the Heathcote County Council. He had held leading positions with the Canterbury Automobile Association, the South Island Motor Union, and had been a director for an insurance company. At the time of the by-election, he was an executive member of the Canterbury Progress League, a councillor for the Canterbury Chamber of Commerce, and a member of the Arthur's Pass National Park Board.

=== Independent ===
Edward L. Hills was described as the unknown factor prior to the by-election. A young man of considerable vitality, he was described as the best speaker of the three candidates. He was involved in trade unions in Christchurch and had been a member of the Labour Party, but he resigned on 1 August 1933 (the day before James McCombs' death) as the Woolston branch of Labour did not support his nomination for the selection ballot for the next general election. He thus contested the by-election as an independent.

== Election campaign ==
McCombs's campaign was dominated by the fact that she was a woman. She chose to address this issue head on by using "Vote the first woman to the New Zealand Parliament" as her campaign slogan. Although it appears that the major newspapers had few worries about electing a woman, many people did. The leader of the Labour Party, Harry Holland, attended some of the campaign meetings in support of McCombs. McCombs was received favourably at various meetings; many attendees were, unsurprisingly, women.

Freeman received considerable support with his campaign from the coalition government. William Bodkin and Walter Broadfoot, United Party Members of Parliament representing the Otago Central and Waitomo electorates, respectively, were both present and campaigning on Hills' behalf. They were not received very favourably, though. One of Broadfoot's meetings in Lyttelton for women was attended by only five electors. A later meeting in the Labour stronghold of Woolston was much better frequented, with 200 attendees busy interjecting him during his speech. That meeting was concluded with a formal thanks to the speaker, and three cheers for McCombs. Bodkin had a more orderly meeting in Cashmere.

Freeman himself was well received. At a meeting in St Martins, he addressed an audience of 50. A motion was passed to record "thanks and confidence", and an amendment to delete the word 'confidence' from the motion was defeated.

Hills was reported as saying: "I believe the same as Hitler believes, that woman's place is in the home", and further that "I believe the difficulties of the country are too great for women to grapple with." Many letter writers to the press were also unimpressed at the prospect of having a woman in parliament.

Hills was criticised at election meetings that he would split the Labour vote. He was also asked whether he received money from somebody for standing in the election, insinuating that the conservative candidate might possibly have an interest in the vote of the working class being split.

The election campaign was also seen as important because of the Great Depression that New Zealand was experiencing and was viewed to be a referendum on the government's response.

== Results ==
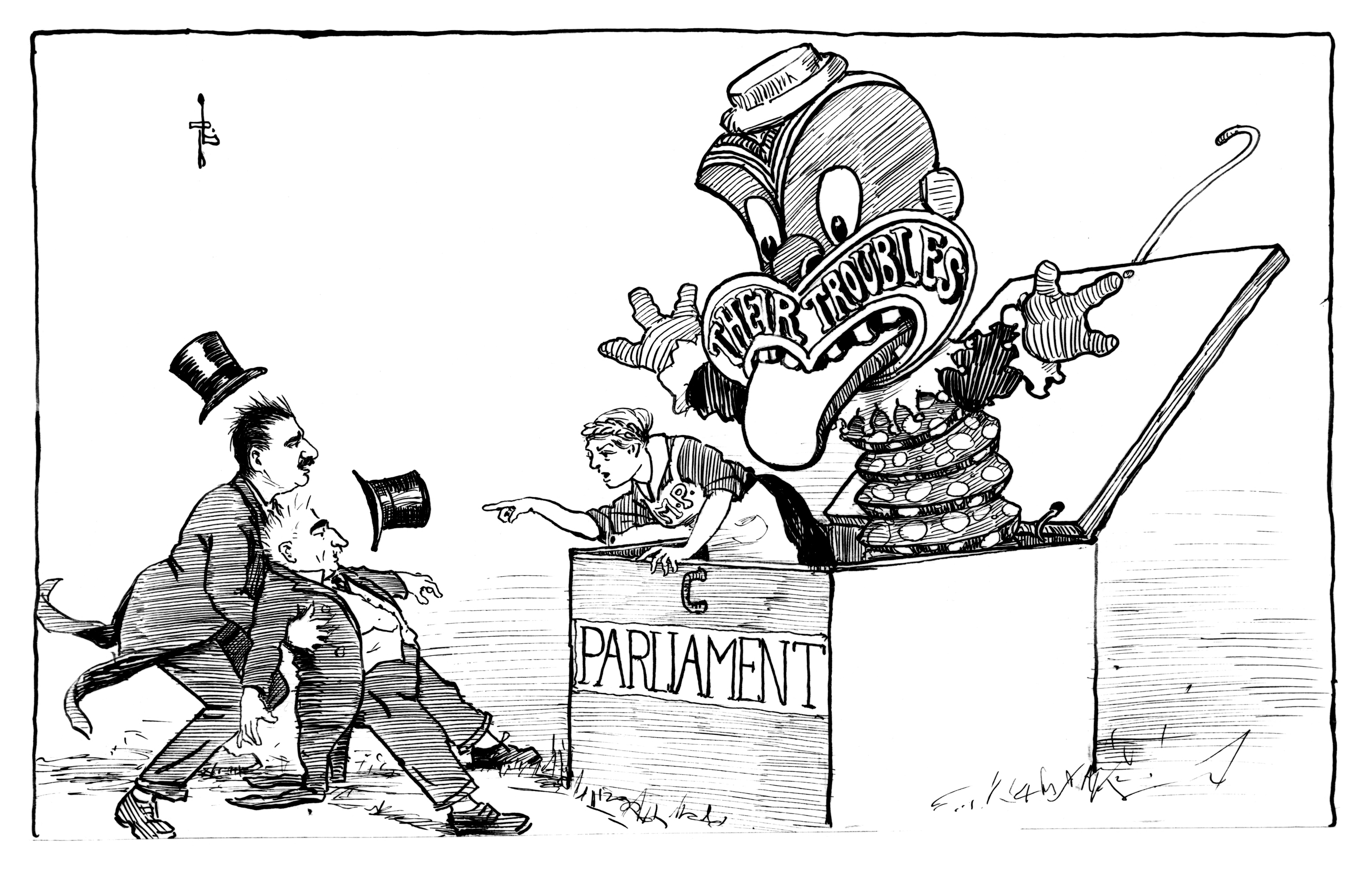
A cartoon showing Forbes & Coates reacting in surprise at McCombs' victory.

The results of the Lyttelton electorate at the 1931 general election were:

Lyttelton electorate at the 1931 New Zealand general election
Party	Candidate	Votes	%	±%
Labour	James McCombs	5,404	49.77	
United/Reform	Frederick Freeman	5,372	49.48	
Independent	W L Page	82	0.76	
Majority		32	0.29	
Turnout		10,858		

Results of the by-election held on 13 September 1933 were:

1933 Lyttelton by-election
Party	Candidate	Votes	%	±%
Labour	Elizabeth McCombs	6,344	61.66	11.89
United/Reform	Frederick Freeman	3,675	35.72	−13.76
Independent Labour	Edward Hills	269	2.61	
Majority		2,669	25.94	+25.65
Turnout		10,288	74.98	

Elizabeth McCombs won 16 of the 23 polling places.

== Legacy ==
"I am proud to be the first woman to be elected to our Parliament" McCombs said upon her victory. "It will be my endeavour to live up to the tradition the women of New Zealand have established for taking their full share of the burden of government." Despite heavy rain, this speech was delivered in front of 2000 supporters in Cathedral Square. It is unclear how much bearing her being a woman had on her being elected given that the swing to her was similar to the swing to labour in the 1935 general election. Her time in parliament would however only last two years as she died on 7 June 1935 of ill health. Her electorate was taken over by her son Terry McCombs in the Lyttelton by-election of 1935.

Elizabeth McCombs is still remembered today. New Zealand's first woman prime minister to gain her position at an election, Helen Clark, said:

"Elizabeth McCombs made history when she was elected as New Zealand's first woman member of Parliament, New Zealand women had waited a long time for that day. Her election came 40 years after women gained the right to vote. As a Labour Prime Minister and leader of the New Zealand Labour Party, I am very proud of Elizabeth McCombs' historic first. I see it as one of many steps in the political progress of women in our country which made it possible for me to become leader of the Labour Party and Prime Minister."

While Ruth Dyson, who is the member of parliament for Port Hills, which includes the town of Lyttelton, said:

"She cracked one of the many glass ceilings and laid the groundwork for women such as me to enter Parliament and represent our communities in a compassionate and intelligent manner. Let us all remember Elizabeth McCombs, for it is in her footsteps that many of us now tread."
