= 24th New Zealand Parliament =

Term of the Parliament of New Zealand

24th Parliament of New Zealand
←	23rd Parliament	25th Parliament	→
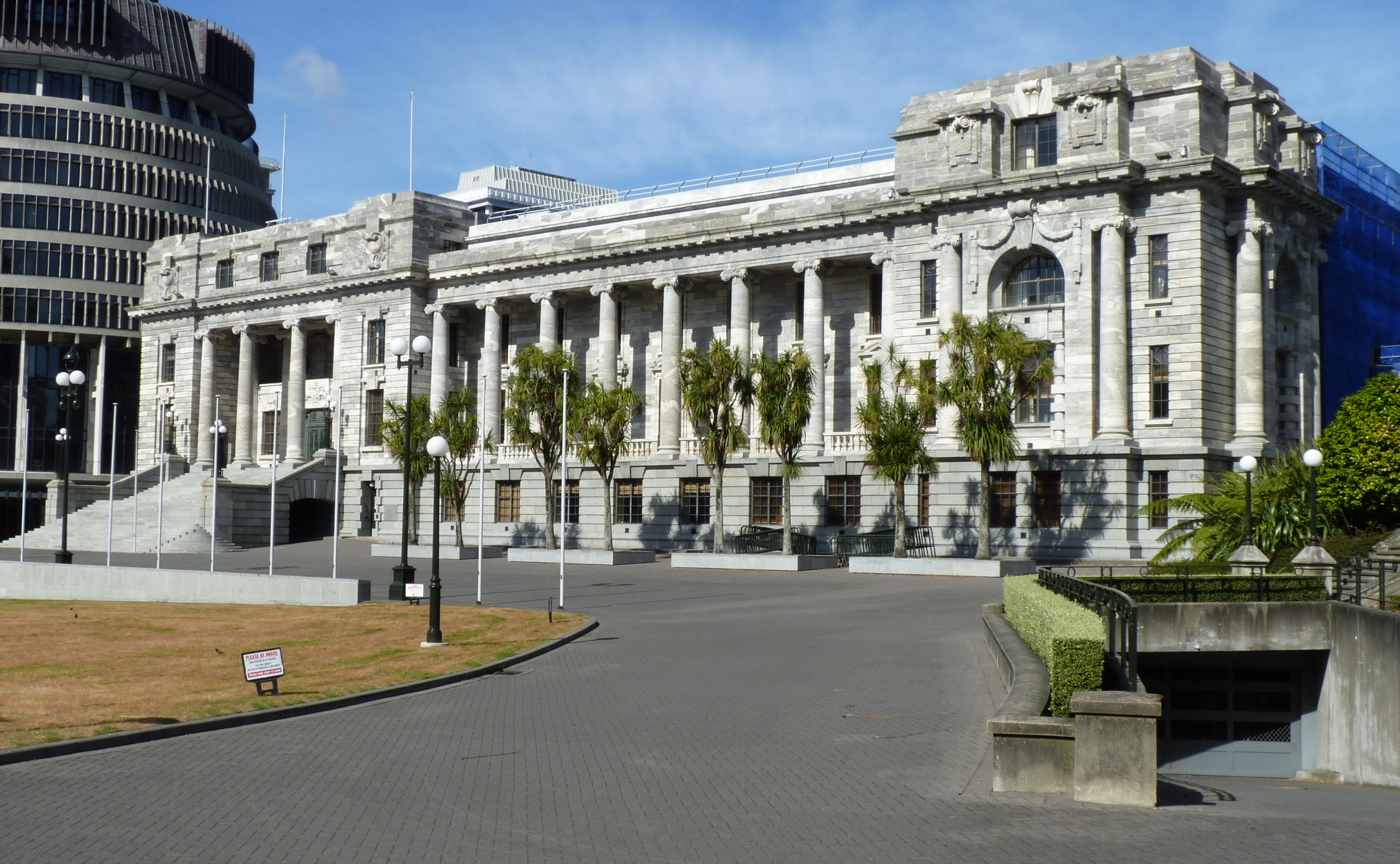
- Parliament House, Wellington

Overview
- Legislative body: New Zealand Parliament
- Term: 23 February 1932 – 26 October 1935
- Election: 1931 New Zealand general election
- Government: United–Reform coalition Government

House of Representatives
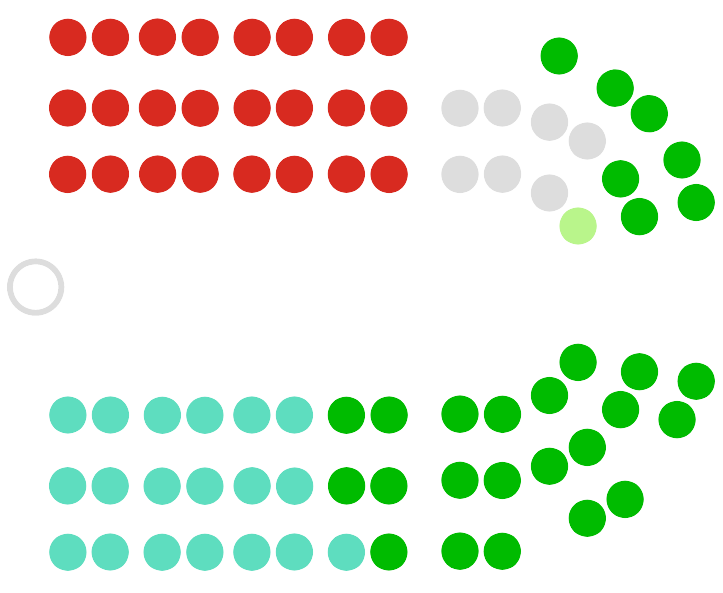
- Members: 80
- Speaker of the House: Charles Statham
- Prime Minister: George Forbes
- Leader of the Opposition: Michael Joseph Savage from 12 October 1933 — Harry Holland until 8 October 1933 †

Legislative Council
- Members: 35 (at start); 28 (at end)
- Speaker of the Council: Sir Walter Carncross
- Leader of the Council: Robert Masters

Sovereign
- Monarch: HM George V
- Governor-General: HE Rt. Hon. The Viscount Galway from 12 April 1935 — HE Rt. Hon. The Lord Bledisloe until 15 March 1935

Sessions
- 1st: 23 February 1932 – 28 October 1932
- 2nd: 1 November 1932 – 10 March 1933
- 3rd: 21 September 1933 – 22 December 1933
- 4th: 28 June 1934 – 5 April 1935
- 5th: 29 August 1935 – 26 October 1935

The 24th New Zealand Parliament was a term of the New Zealand Parliament. It opened on 23 February 1932, following the 1931 election. It was dissolved on 1 November 1935 in preparation for the 1935 election. The 24th Parliament was extended by one year because the 1935 election was held later than anticipated due to the ongoing depression, similarly the 1919, and the 1943 elections were held two years late, having been postponed during World War I and World War II respectively.

The Prime Minister during the 24th Parliament was George Forbes, leader of the United Party. Many commentators at the time, however, alleged that Gordon Coates, leader of the larger Reform Party, had the greater influence.

The 24th Parliament consisted of eighty representatives, each elected from separate geographical electorates.

== Ministries ==
The 24th Parliament was led by a coalition of the Reform Party and the United Party; Reform had twenty-eight seats, United had nineteen, and there were four pro-coalition independents. The primary opposition was from the Labour Party, which had twenty-four seats. The small Country Party had one seat, and there were four non-aligned independents. The distribution of seats between three large parties (also a feature of the previous parliament) was relatively unusual, as New Zealand tended towards a two-party system at the time.

The coalition government had been formed on 22 September 1931 during the term of the previous Parliament. During the difficult times of the Great Depression, Forbes had wanted to form a grand coalition with the Labour Party and the Reform Party. Labour refused, but Reform went into a coalition government with United from September 1931.

== Party standings ==
=== Start of Parliament ===
Party	Leader(s)	Seats at start
Reform Party	Gordon Coates	28
Labour Party	Harry Holland	24
United Party	George Forbes	19
Country Party	Harold Rushworth	1
Independents		8

=== End of Parliament ===
Party	Leader(s)	Seats at end
Reform Party	Gordon Coates	29
Labour Party	Michael Joseph Savage	24
United Party	George Forbes	16
Democrat Party	Thomas Hislop (outside parliament)	2
Country Party	Harold Rushworth	1
Ratana	Eruera Tirikatene	1
Independents		7

== Electoral boundaries ==
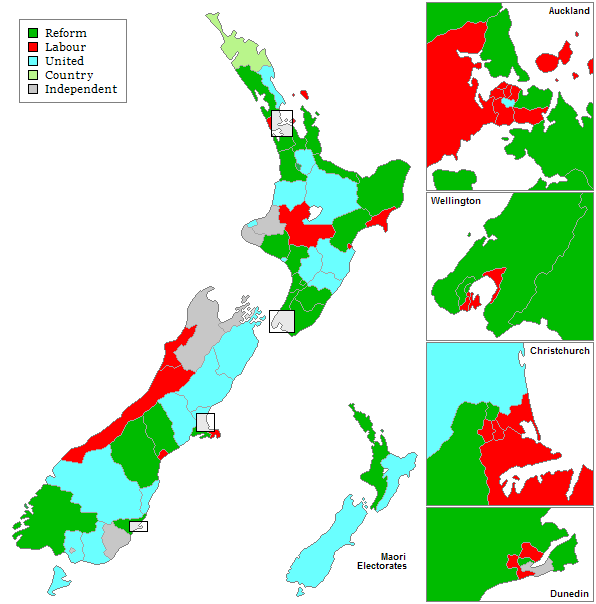

== Members ==
=== Initial MPs ===
The following table shows the detailed results:

Key

Reform Labour United Country Party Independent Liberal Ratana Independent

Electorate results for the 1931 New Zealand general election
Electorate	Incumbent	Winner	Majority	Runner up
General electorates
Auckland Central	Bill Parry		3,793	Harold Penfound Congdon
Auckland East	James Donald	Bill Schramm	2,256	Harold Percy Burton
Auckland Suburbs	Rex Mason		1,223	Richard Herbert Marryatt
Auckland West	Michael Joseph Savage		4,517	Hugh Ross Mackenzie
Avon	Dan Sullivan		3,039	Harben Robert Young
Awarua	Philip De La Perrelle		2,148	Norman McIntyre
Bay of Islands	Harold Rushworth		1,209	Allen Bell
Bay of Plenty	Kenneth Williams		Uncontested	
Buller	Harry Holland		3,631	John Menzies
Central Otago	William Bodkin		2,516	Charles Todd
Chalmers	Alfred Ansell		172	Norman Hartley Campbell
Christchurch East	Tim Armstrong		3,206	George Frederick Allen
Christchurch North	Henry Holland		2,077	Elizabeth McCombs
Christchurch South	Ted Howard		2,798	Charlie McCully
Clutha	Fred Waite	Peter McSkimming	1,530	Fred Waite
Dunedin Central	Charles Statham		262	Peter Neilson
Dunedin North	Jim Munro		524	John McCrae
Dunedin South	William Taverner	Fred Jones	3,644	William Taverner
Dunedin West	William Downie Stewart Jr		924	John Gilchrist
Eden	Arthur Stallworthy		1,270	Bill Anderton
Egmont	Charles Wilkinson		1,308	F. Gawith
Franklin	Jack Massey		2,457	Harry Oswald Mellsop
Gisborne	Douglas Lysnar	David Coleman	317	Douglas Lysnar
Grey Lynn	John Fletcher	John A. Lee	3,242	John Fletcher
Hamilton	Alexander Young		3,072	Hubert Beebe
Hauraki	Walter William Massey		2,750	Charles Robert Petrie
Hawke's Bay	Hugh Campbell		2,259	Ted Cullen
Hurunui	George Forbes		3,953	R. J. Logan
Hutt	Walter Nash		2,823	James Kerr (Note: For some biographical details of James Kerr refer to his father's article)
Invercargill	Vincent Ward	James Hargest	508	William McChesney
Kaiapoi	Richard Hawke		1,414	John Archer
Kaipara	Gordon Coates		2,084	Albert Edward Robinson
Lyttelton	James McCombs		32	Frederick Willie Freeman
Manawatu	Joseph Linklater		2,246	Lorrie Hunter
Manukau	Bill Jordan		3,394	Stanley Rickards
Marsden	Alfred Murdoch		2,942	Jim Barclay
Masterton	George Sykes		1,951	Peter Butler
Mataura	David McDougall		943	Thomas Golden
Mid-Canterbury	David Jones	Jeremiah Connolly	136	David Jones
Motueka	George Black		517	Keith Holyoake
Napier	Bill Barnard		1,456	John Butler
Nelson	Harry Atmore		100	Herbert Everett
New Plymouth	Sydney George Smith		3,472	William Sheat
Oamaru	John Andrew MacPherson		1,046	John Kirkness
Oroua	John Cobbe		Uncontested	
Otaki	William Hughes Field		1,321	Jim Thorn
Pahiatua	Alfred Ransom		Uncontested	
Palmerston	Jimmy Nash		1,245	Joe Hodgens
Parnell	Bill Endean		4,821	John William Yarnall
Patea	Harold Dickie		3,495	W. G. Simpson
Raglan	Lee Martin	Stewart Reid	806	Lee Martin
Rangitikei	James Thomas Hogan	Alexander Stuart	15	James Thomas Hogan
Riccarton	Bert Kyle		589	Archibald Albany McLachlan (Note: For some biographical details of McLachlan refer to his grandfather's article)
Roskill	George Munns	Arthur Shapton Richards	171	William John Holdsworth
Rotorua	Cecil Clinkard		57	Alexander Moncur
Stratford	William Polson		1,518	J W McMillan (Note: McMillan claimed to stand for the Reform Party, but he was not the official candidate, as the United–Reform Coalition endorsed William Polson, who ran as an Independent)
Tauranga	Charles Macmillan		658	Bill Sullivan (Note: Bill Sullivan was a member of the United Party, but Charles Macmillan was the official candidate of the United–Reform Coalition, hence Sullivan stood as an Independent)
Temuka	Thomas Burnett		1,237	Thomas Herbert Langford
Thames	Albert Samuel		464	John Sommerville Montgomerie
Timaru	Clyde Carr		820	Herbert N. Armstrong (Note: The Reform and United parties could not agree on an official coalition candidate for the Timaru electorate, so neither Armstrong (Reform) nor Herbert Hall (United) were official candidates, and many sources show them as Independents)
Waikato	Frederick Lye		981	Solomon Netheim Ziman (Note: Ziman was the father of John Ziman)
Waimarino	Frank Langstone		591	William Henry Wackrow
Waipawa	Albert Jull (Note: Jull was the official candidate of the United–Reform Coalition)		386	John Davies Ormond, Jr. (Note: Ormond was the son of John Davies Ormond and the father of John Ormond)
Wairarapa	Thomas McDonald	Alex McLeod	616	Thomas McDonald
Wairau	Edward Healy		1,424	William Girling
Waitaki	John Bitchener		885	Alexander McLean Paterson
Waitemata	Alexander Harris		2,378	Arthur Osborne
Waitomo	Walter Broadfoot		Uncontested	
Wallace	Adam Hamilton		2,842	Peter Gilfedder
Wanganui	Bill Veitch		590	Bill Rogers
Wellington Central	Peter Fraser		2,471	Robert Darroch
Wellington East	Bob Semple		593	Thomas Forsyth
Wellington North	Charles Chapman		1,061	George Troup
Wellington South	Robert McKeen		2,659	Will Appleton
Wellington Suburbs	Robert Wright		2,570	Tom Brindle
Westland	James O'Brien		1,121	John Greenslade
Māori electorates
Eastern Maori	Āpirana Ngata		3,211	Pita Moko
Northern Maori	Taurekareka Henare		1,188	Paraire Karaka Paikea
Southern Maori	Tuiti Makitanara		19	Eruera Tirikatene
Western Maori	Taite Te Tomo		1,436	Toko Ratana

Table footnotes:

- Four of the eight independent MPs (Connolly, Hargest, McSkimming, and Polson) were aligned with the United–Reform Coalition, and are not classified as independents by some sources.

== By-elections during 24th Parliament ==
There were a number of changes during the term of the 24th Parliament.

Electorate and by-election		Date	Incumbent	Cause	Winner
Southern Maori	1932	3 August	Tuiti Makitānara	Death	Eruera Tirikātene
Motueka	1932	1 December	George Black	Death	Keith Holyoake
Lyttelton	1933	13 September	James McCombs	Death	Elizabeth McCombs
Buller	1933	22 November	Harry Holland	Death	Paddy Webb
Lyttelton	1935	24 July	Elizabeth McCombs	Death	Terry McCombs

=== Summary of changes ===
- Tuiti Makitanara, the United MP for Southern Maori, died on 26 June 1932. The resulting 1932 by-election was won by Eruera Tirikatene, an independent candidate associated with the Rātana religious movement.
- George Black, the independent MP for Motueka, died on 7 October 1932. The resulting 1932 by-election was won by Keith Holyoake of the Reform Party.
- James McCombs, the Labour MP for Lyttelton, died on 2 August 1933. The resulting 1933 by-election Labour victory by his wife, Elizabeth McCombs, made her the first woman to win election to the New Zealand Parliament.
- Harry Holland, leader of the Labour Party and MP for Buller, died on 8 October 1933. The resulting 1933 by-election was won by Paddy Webb, also of the Labour Party.
- Elizabeth McCombs died on 7 June 1935, twenty-two months after her husband's death, and the resulting 1935 by-election returned her son, Terry McCombs.
