= 1933 Buller by-election =

New Zealand by-election

- 22 November 1933
- Turnout: 7,048 (71.36%)
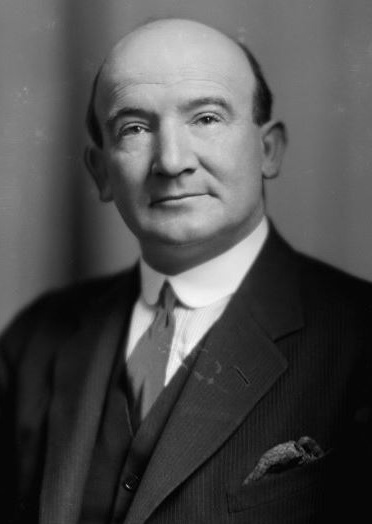

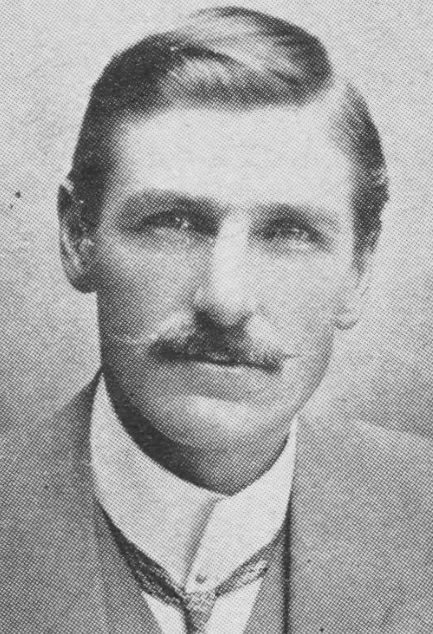
Candidate	Paddy Webb	H. Ian Simson
Party	Labour	Liberal–Labour
Popular vote	4,799	2,249
Percentage	68.10	31.90
Member before election
Harry Holland
Labour
Elected Member
Paddy Webb
Labour

The Buller by-election of 1933 was a by-election during the 24th New Zealand Parliament in the Buller electorate. It was held on Wednesday 22 November 1933. The seat had become vacant due to the death of Labour party leader Harry Holland who was also the leader of the opposition. Two candidates contested the seat, and it was won by Labour's Paddy Webb, who defeated Liberal-Labour candidate H. Ian Simson from Hawke's Bay.

== Candidates ==
=== Labour ===
There were four names nominated for the Labour Party candidacy. They were:

- Roy Holland, the advertising manager at the Maoriland Worker – son of Harry Holland
- John Smeaton, the president of the United Mine Workers Union
- Jim Thorn, a journalist and former President of the Labour Party (1929–31)
- Paddy Webb, a miner and former MP for Grey (1913–18)

Holland as well as Angus McLagan had declined to be candidates prior to the selection meeting. Webb was ultimately chosen as the official Labour candidate.

=== Lib-Lab ===
Horace Ian Simson, the former Mayor of Hastings and chairman of the Hawke's Bay Rivers Board, stood in the seat as a Liberal–Labour candidate. He campaigned on a platform of Seddon liberalism. He had previously stood as a candidate at the 1917 Hawkes Bay by-election.

=== Others ===
Edward L. Hills, a Christchurch based trade unionist, announced himself as an independent Labour candidate. He had recently stood at the 1933 Lyttelton by-election. However, Hills withdrew his candidacy shortly before nominations closed. The governing coalition government made up of the United and Reform parties did not contest the seat. It was the first time they had not stood a candidate in the by-election.

== Campaign ==
Webb, who had previously clashed with the leadership of the United Mine Workers Union over worker employment status, faced opposition from its members during the election. The union's secretary, Angus McLagan, was particularly opposed to Webb and stumped the coalfields in the constituency making speeches demanding that Webb be replaced by a genuine miners' candidate to represent Labour. Webb shrugged the criticism off and was defended by Labour MPs.

== Results ==
The following table gives the election results:

1933 Buller by-election
Party	Candidate	Votes	%	±%
Labour	Paddy Webb	4,799	68.10	
Liberal–Labour	H. Ian Simson	2,249	31.90	
Informal votes		343	4.86	+3.14
Majority		2,550	36.18	
Turnout		7,048	71.36	−17.66
