= Terry McCombs =

New Zealand politician

The Honourable Sir Terry McCombs OBE ED
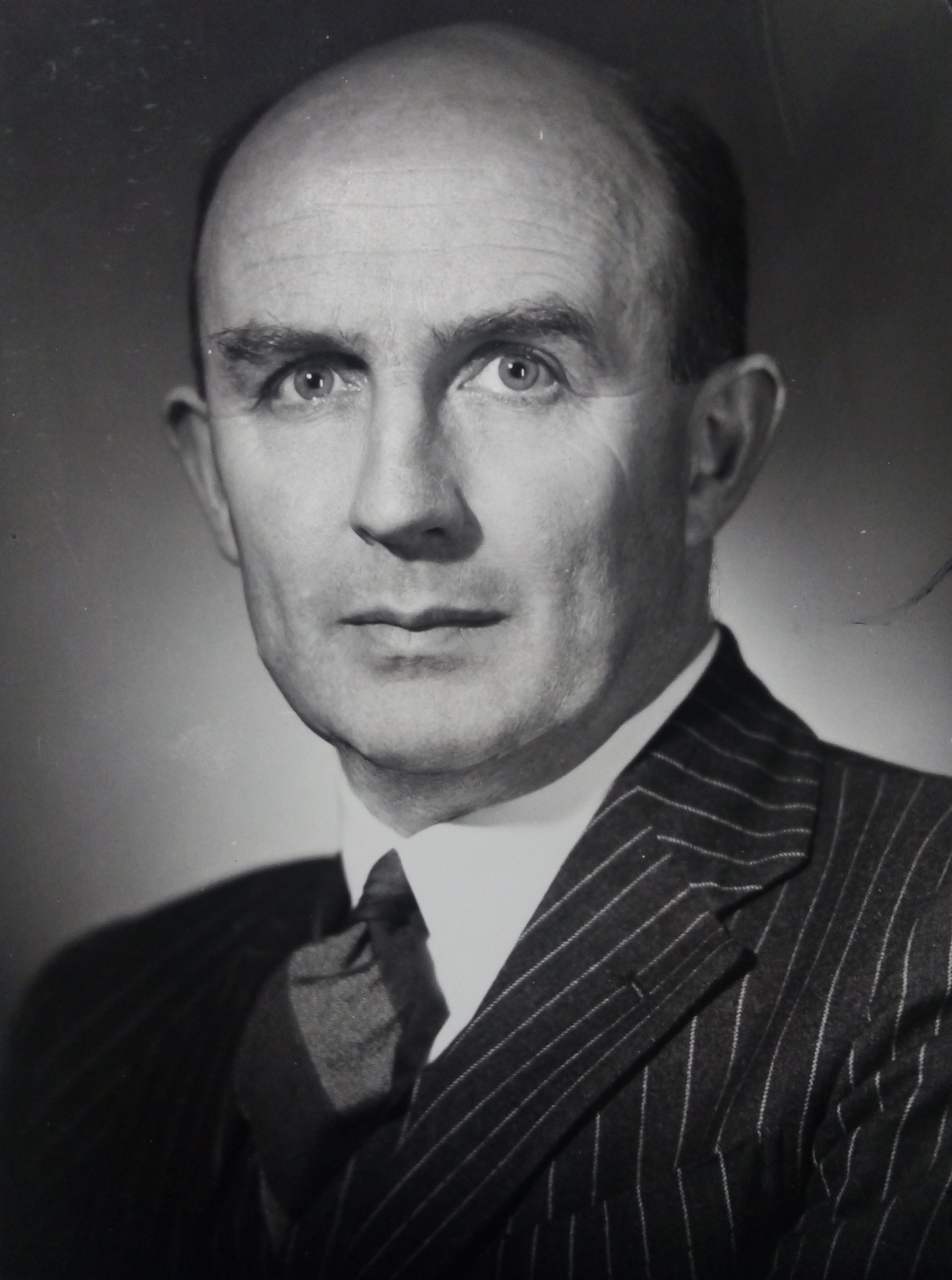
- McCombs, c. 1950

15th High Commissioner from New Zealand to the United Kingdom
- In office 15 March 1973 – 22 March 1975
- Monarch: Elizabeth II
- Preceded by: Merwyn Norrish
- Succeeded by: Hugh Watt

24th Minister of Education
- In office 18 October 1947 – 13 December 1949
- Prime Minister: Peter Fraser
- Preceded by: Rex Mason
- Succeeded by: Ronald Algie

6th Minister for Science and Industrial Research
- In office 18 October 1947 – 13 December 1949
- Prime Minister: Peter Fraser
- Preceded by: Arnold Nordmeyer
- Succeeded by: Keith Holyoake

Member of the New Zealand Parliament for Lyttelton
- In office 24 July 1935 – 1 September 1951
- Preceded by: Elizabeth McCombs
- Succeeded by: Harry Lake

Personal details
- Born: 5 September 1905 Christchurch, New Zealand
- Died: 6 November 1982 (aged 77) Kawakawa, New Zealand
- Party: Labour
- Spouses: Beryl Lavinia Butterick (m. 1935; died 1952) Christina Mary Tulloch (m. 1955–1982)
- Relations: James McCombs (father); Elizabeth McCombs (mother); Christina Henderson (aunt); Stella Henderson (aunt)
- Children: 5
- Education: Canterbury University College
- Profession: School teacher and headmaster

Sir Terence Henderson McCombs OBE ED (5 September 1905 – 6 November 1982) was a New Zealand politician of the Labour Party, a High Commissioner, and the first principal of Cashmere High School.

== Biography ==
=== Early life ===
McCombs was born in 1905 and received his early education at Fendalton School. He was further educated at Christchurch Boys' High School and Waitaki Boys' High School before graduating from Canterbury University College with MSc(Hons) in chemistry in 1929. He won two research scholarships in chemistry and was hoping to obtain a post in the Department of Scientific and Industrial Research (DSIR) but at the time, due to the Great Depression, the DSIR was not hiring any new staff. Instead he was appointed as a teacher at Seddon Memorial Technical College in Auckland in 1934.

=== Member of Parliament ===
New Zealand Parliament
Years	Term	Electorate	Party
1935	24th	Lyttelton	Labour
1935–1938	25th	Lyttelton	Labour
1938–1943	26th	Lyttelton	Labour
1943–1946	27th	Lyttelton	Labour
1946–1949	28th	Lyttelton	Labour
1949–1951	29th	Lyttelton	Labour

Following his mother's death, McCombs was selected as her replacement as the Labour Party candidate for the Lyttelton electorate. He was elected and represented Lyttelton from the 1935 by-election until he was defeated in the bitter 1951 election. In 1936, McCombs was appointed to the Canterbury University College Council, and he remained a member until 1947, when he became Minister of Education. From 1938 to 1947 he was a member of the Lyttelton Harbour Board.

From 1945 to 1947 he was Under-Secretary to Walter Nash, the Minister of Finance. He was Minister of Education and Minister for Science and Industrial Research from 1947 to 1949, near the end of the term of the First Labour Government. As Minister of Education, he was involved on behalf of the Government in the purchase of the Ilam campus for the university. In the centennial history of the university, it is stated that "Canterbury has never enjoyed greater ministerial support than it did from McCombs".

Following the defeat of the Labour government McCombs was nominated to stand for the deputy leadership in January 1951 following the death of Peter Fraser. He polled second in the caucus ballot with seven votes, compared to Jerry Skinner with twenty-two and two votes to Fred Hackett.

=== Post-parliamentary career ===
At the 1950 local-body elections he was elected a member of the Christchurch City Council. Re-elected in 1953, he did not stand for a third term in 1956.

After his parliamentary defeat in 1951, McCombs returned to teaching. In 1956, he became the founding headmaster of Cashmere High School in Christchurch. In 1957, he again became a member of the University of Canterbury Council (the name of which Canterbury University College had been changed to). He was Chancellor of the University of Canterbury from 1968 to 1971. He was a member of Rotary International and belonged to the Christchurch South club, of which he was the district governor of in 1967.

From 1973 to 1975 he was New Zealand's High Commissioner to the United Kingdom. After being recalled early from his posting to London, to ease the retirement of outgoing Deputy Prime Minister Hugh Watt, he was appointed chairman of the Committee on Secondary Schools from 1975 to 1976.

In 1977 he began a second spell on the Christchurch City Council, elected in the Eastern Ward. He was appointed chairman of the council's town-planning committee. He gained a wealth of knowledge on the subject of planning and the complex laws that governed it and, according to Deputy Mayor Rex Lester, he "...always seemed to have the uncanny ability in coming up with the right decision." After Labour won a majority on the city council in 1980, McCombs was speculated as a possible Deputy Mayor, but he was not interested in the job and happy to make way for Lester who, unlike McCombs, had mayoral ambitions.

=== Death ===
He died on 6 November 1982 in Kawakawa hospital, aged 77, while on a holiday in Northland. He was survived by his second wife, four sons and a daughter. He was buried at Waimairi Cemetery in Christchurch.

== Honours and awards ==
In 1953, McCombs was awarded the Queen Elizabeth II Coronation Medal. He was appointed an Officer of the Order of the British Empire, for services to education, in the 1971 Queen's Birthday Honours and a Knight Bachelor in April 1975.

== Family ==
His parents, Elizabeth McCombs (née Henderson) and James McCombs, were both socialists. Between them, his parents represented the Lyttelton electorate from 1913 to 1935.

In 1935 he married Beryl Lavinia Butterick. Beryl died in 1952, and as a result McCombs became a solo parent with four school-age children. He was later remarried to Christina Mary Tulloch in 1955. His second wife, Christina, Lady McCombs, was awarded the Queen's Service Medal for community service in the 2007 New Year Honours. She died in Christchurch on 13 August 2016, aged 99 years.

== Notes ==
New Zealand Parliament
Preceded by Elizabeth McCombs	Member of Parliament for Lyttelton; 1935–1951	Succeeded by Harry Lake
Political offices
Preceded by Rex Mason	Minister of Education; 1947–1949	Succeeded by Ronald Algie
Preceded by Arnold Nordmeyer	Minister for Science and Industrial Research; 1947–1949	Succeeded by Keith Holyoake
Academic offices
Preceded by Alwyn Warren	Chancellor of the University of Canterbury; 1968–1971	Succeeded by John Matson
Diplomatic posts
Preceded by Denis Blundell; Merwyn Norrish (acting)	High Commissioner of New Zealand to the United Kingdom; 1973–1975	Succeeded by Hugh Watt
