= Lyttelton (electorate) =

Lyttelton is a former New Zealand parliamentary electorate. It existed from 1853 to 1890, and again from 1893 to 1996, when it was replaced by the Banks Peninsula electorate.

== Population centres ==
The New Zealand Constitution Act 1852, passed by the British government, allowed New Zealand to establish a representative government. The initial 24 New Zealand electorates were defined by Governor George Grey in March 1853. Lyttelton was one of the initial single-member electorates.

The electorate was in the eastern suburbs of Christchurch, New Zealand, and included the port of Lyttelton.

== History ==
The electorate was created in 1853 and existed until 1890. In the 1890 election, the Akaroa electorate covered the town of Lyttelton. The Lyttelton electorate was re-established for the 1893 election and existed until 1996, the first mixed-member proportional (MMP) election, when it was included in the Banks Peninsula electorate.

The nomination meeting for the first election was held on 15 August 1853 at the Reading Room in Lyttelton. The first election was held two days later on a Wednesday at the Resident Magistrate's Office in Lyttelton, with Charles Simeon as Resident Magistrate acting as the returning officer. The election was contested by Christopher Edward Dampier, the solicitor of the Canterbury Association, and James FitzGerald, who in the previous month had been elected Canterbury's first Superintendent. FitzGerald won the election by 55 votes to 45. In the 1855 election, FitzGerald was returned unopposed. FitzGerald represented the electorate until 1857, when he resigned due to ill health.

Crosbie Ward won the resulting by-election in May 1858. Ward was re-elected unopposed on 25 January 1861.

Edward Allen Hargreaves won the 1866 election. He resigned in April 1867. Hargreaves was succeeded by George Macfarlan, who was elected unopposed in a 1 July 1867 by-election. Macfarlan died in office on 9 October 1868.

John Thomas Peacock won the 2 November 1868 by-election. At the 1871 election, Peacock was re-elected unopposed. He held the seat until April 1873, when was promoted to the New Zealand Legislative Council (the upper house). He resigned from Parliament on 5 April 1873. The resulting by-election on 19 May 1873 was won by his brother in law, Henry Richard Webb, who beat Hugh Murray-Aynsley.

At the 28 December 1875 general election, the Lyttelton electorate was contested by the same two candidates as the 1873 by-election, but this time, Murray-Aynsley was successful. Murray-Aynsley was defeated by Harry Allwright in the 1879 general election held on 4 September.

John Joyce represented Lyttelton from 1887 to 1890 and from 1893 to 1899. The electorate was held from 1913 by James McCombs for the Social Democrats and then for Labour; he was succeeded by his wife when he died, and then his son when she also died.

The 1925 general election was contested by Melville Lyons and the incumbent, James McCombs. The original count resulted in a tie of 4,900 votes each. The returning officer gave his casting vote to Lyons and declared him elected. A recount was demanded, and on 3 December 1925, an amended result of 4890 votes for Lyons and 4884 votes for McCombs was determined, with the differences in the counts explained by counting informal votes in a different way. Lyons' election was declared void on 13 March 1926, and the previous holder, McCombs, was restored as the holder of the electorate. The 22nd Parliament had its first sitting on 16 June 1926, hence Lyons had not been sworn in before his election was declared void.

The 1931 election had a close result, with McCombs just 32 votes ahead of the United–Reform Coalition candidate, Christchurch civil engineer Frederick Willie Freeman.

The seat has been held by National and Norman Kirk transferred to the safer (for Labour) Sydenham seat in 1969, just as his predecessor Harry Lake transferred to the safer (for National) Fendalton seat in 1960.

=== Election results ===
Key

Independent Liberal Social Democrat Labour Reform National

Election	Winner
1853 election	James FitzGerald
1855 election	James FitzGerald
1858 by-election	Crosbie Ward
1861 election	Crosbie Ward
1866 election	Edward Hargreaves
1867 by-election	George Macfarlan
1868 by-election	John Thomas Peacock
1871 election	John Thomas Peacock
1873 by-election	Henry Richard Webb
1875 election	Hugh Murray-Aynsley
1879 election	Harry Allwright
1881 election	Harry Allwright
1884 election	Harry Allwright
1887 election	John Joyce
(Electorate abolished 1890–1893; see Akaroa)
1893 election	John Joyce
1896 election	John Joyce
1899 election	George Laurenson
1902 election	George Laurenson
1905 election	George Laurenson
1908 election	George Laurenson
1911 election	George Laurenson
1913 by-election	James McCombs
1914 election	James McCombs
1919 election	James McCombs
1922 election	James McCombs
1925 election	Melville Lyons
13 March 1926 (Note: 1925 election result declared invalid in 1926 and McCombs reinstated.)	James McCombs
1928 election	James McCombs
1931 election	James McCombs
1933 by-election	Elizabeth McCombs
1935 by-election	Terry McCombs
1935 election	Terry McCombs
1938 election	Terry McCombs
1943 election	Terry McCombs
1946 election	Terry McCombs
1949 election	Terry McCombs
1951 election	Harry Lake
1954 election	Harry Lake
1957 election	Norman Kirk
1960 election	Norman Kirk
1963 election	Norman Kirk
1966 election	Norman Kirk
1969 election	Tom McGuigan
1972 election	Tom McGuigan
1975 election	Colleen Dewe
1978 election	Ann Hercus
1981 election	Ann Hercus
1984 election	Ann Hercus
1987 election	Peter Simpson
1990 election	Gail McIntosh
1993 election	Ruth Dyson
(Electorate abolished 1996; see Banks Peninsula)

Table footnotes:

== Election results ==
=== 1993 election ===
1993 general election: Lyttelton
Party	Candidate	Votes	%	±%
Labour	Ruth Dyson	9,616	40.60	
National	David Carter	8,939	37.74	
Alliance	Ann Lewis	3,729	15.74	+6.98
NZ First	Ross Gluer	829	3.50	
Christian Heritage	Bruce Burnett	375	1.58	
Natural Law	David Lovell-Smith	193	0.81	
Majority		677	2.85	
Turnout		23,681	87.71	+0.55
Registered electors		26,997		

=== 1990 election ===
1990 general election: Lyttelton
Party	Candidate	Votes	%	±%
National	Gail McIntosh	9,368	41.13	
Labour	Peter Simpson	9,300	40.83	−15.13
NewLabour	Ann Lewis	1,996	8.76	
Green	Cliff Mason	1,760	7.72	
Democrats	Audrey Scott	141	0.61	
Social Credit	Louise Moore	137	0.60	
McGillicuddy Serious	Tom Wells	74	0.32	
Majority		68	0.29	
Turnout		22,776	87.16	−1.37
Registered electors		26,129		

=== 1987 election ===
1987 general election: Lyttelton
Party	Candidate	Votes	%	±%
Labour	Peter Simpson	12,362	55.96	
National	Philip Hall	8,629	39.06	
Democrats	Michael Bruce	813	3.68	−0.45
NZ Party	Alan John Roberts	187	0.84	
Imperial British Conservative	Paul Swafford	96	0.43	
Majority		3,733	16.90	
Turnout		22,087	88.53	−4.11
Registered electors		24,948		

=== 1984 election ===
1984 general election: Lyttelton
Party	Candidate	Votes	%	±%
Labour	Ann Hercus	11,994	51.52	−2.47
National	Doug Graham	7,031	30.20	
NZ Party	Ross Burrows	3,291	14.13	
Social Credit	Michael Bruce	962	4.13	−5.86
Majority		4,963	21.32	+3.34
Turnout		23,278	92.64	+1.91
Registered electors		25,127		

=== 1981 election ===
1981 general election: Lyttelton
Party	Candidate	Votes	%	±%
Labour	Ann Hercus	11,685	53.99	+5.43
National	Simon Stamers-Smith	7,793	36.01	
Social Credit	Michael Bruce	2,163	9.99	
Majority		3,892	17.98	+11.40
Turnout		21,641	90.73	+19.93
Registered electors		23,852		

=== 1978 election ===
1978 general election: Lyttelton
Party	Candidate	Votes	%	±%
Labour	Ann Hercus	10,493	48.56	
National	Colleen Dewe	9,070	41.98	−5.90
Social Credit	Louise Moore	1,294	5.98	
Values	Helen Chambers	577	2.67	
Independent	John Victor Pierson	153	0.70	
Tory	Suzanne Sadler	17	0.07	
Majority		1,423	6.58	
Turnout		21,604	70.80	−15.09
Registered electors		30,510		

=== 1975 election ===
1975 general election: Lyttelton
Party	Candidate	Votes	%	±%
National	Colleen Dewe	10,107	47.88	
Labour	Tom McGuigan	9,108	43.15	−13.73
Values	Peter Heal	1,300	6.15	
Social Credit	Errol Crockett	592	2.80	
Majority		999	4.73	
Turnout		21,107	85.89	−5.69
Registered electors		24,574		

=== 1972 election ===
The candidate of the Liberal Reform party, William John Jamieson, was described by The Press as "one of the most unusual" in the 1972 election. As an undischarged bankrupt, there was nothing that prevented him from being a candidate, but should he be elected, he could not become an MP, as they cannot hold office as bankrupts.

1972 general election: Lyttelton
Party	Candidate	Votes	%	±%
Labour	Tom McGuigan	11,078	56.88	+9.68
National	John Blumsky	7,843	40.27	
Social Credit	Joe Pounsford	472	2.42	
Liberal Reform	William John Jamieson	52	0.26	
New Democratic	Robert Ramsay Scarth	31	0.15	
Majority		3,235	16.61	+15.05
Turnout		19,476	91.58	−0.18
Registered electors		21,266		

=== 1969 election ===
1969 general election: Lyttelton
Party	Candidate	Votes	%	±%
Labour	Tom McGuigan	8,800	47.20	
National	Peter de Latour	8,508	45.63	+5.83
Social Credit	Terry Huggins	1,042	5.58	
Majority		292	1.56	
Turnout		18,642	91.76	+4.12
Registered electors		20,315		

=== 1966 election ===
1966 general election: Lyttelton
Party	Candidate	Votes	%	±%
Labour	Norman Kirk	9,045	52.00	−2.04
National	Peter de Latour	6,924	39.80	
Social Credit	Cliff Munnings	1,424	8.18	+1.11
Majority		2,121	12.19	−2.97
Turnout		17,393	87.64	−4.51
Registered electors		19,844		

=== 1963 election ===
1963 general election: Lyttelton
Party	Candidate	Votes	%	±%
Labour	Norman Kirk	9,539	54.04	+6.35
National	Tom Flint	6,862	38.87	
Social Credit	Cliff Munnings	1,249	7.07	+0.81
Majority		2,677	15.16	+13.60
Turnout		17,650	92.15	−0.53
Registered electors		19,153		

=== 1960 election ===
1960 general election: Lyttelton
Party	Candidate	Votes	%	±%
Labour	Norman Kirk	7,910	47.65	−1.00
National	Jim Hay	7,650	46.08	
Social Credit	Cliff Munnings	1,040	6.26	
Majority		260	1.56	−1.86
Turnout		16,600	92.68	−1.93
Registered electors		17,911		

=== 1957 election ===
1957 general election: Lyttelton
Party	Candidate	Votes	%	±%
Labour	Norman Kirk	8,064	48.65	
National	Harry Lake	7,497	45.23	+2.94
Social Credit	Wilfrid Owen	1,014	6.11	−12.21
Majority		567	3.42	
Turnout		16,575	94.61	−3.01
Registered electors		17,519		

=== 1954 election ===
1954 general election: Lyttelton
Party	Candidate	Votes	%	±%
National	Harry Lake	6,175	42.29	−8.15
Labour	Tom McGuigan	6,151	42.12	
Social Credit	Wilfrid Owen	2,675	18.32	
Majority		24	0.16	−0.73
Turnout		14,601	91.90	+2.24
Registered electors		15,887		

=== 1951 election ===
1951 general election: Lyttelton
Party	Candidate	Votes	%	±%
National	Harry Lake	7,480	50.44	
Labour	Terry McCombs	7,347	49.55	−3.81
Majority		133	0.89	
Turnout		14,827	89.36	−2.51
Registered electors		16,591		

=== 1949 election ===
1949 general election: Lyttelton
Party	Candidate	Votes	%	±%
Labour	Terry McCombs	7,758	53.36	−1.50
National	Richard Ralph Beauchamp	6,780	46.63	
Majority		978	6.72	−4.30
Turnout		14,538	91.87	+1.55
Registered electors		15,824		

=== 1946 election ===
1946 general election: Lyttelton
Party	Candidate	Votes	%	±%
Labour	Terry McCombs	7,682	54.86	+3.05
National	Ted Taylor	6,319	45.13	+3.77
Majority		1,543	11.02	+0.57
Turnout		14,001	90.32	+0.82
Registered electors		15,500		

=== 1943 election ===
1943 general election: Lyttelton
Party	Candidate	Votes	%	±%
Labour	Terry McCombs	6,817	51.81	−9.58
National	Ted Taylor	5,443	41.37	
Democratic Labour	Malcolm Frederick Nottage	781	5.94	
Real Democracy	Leonard Alexander Jarden	117	0.89	
Informal votes		124	0.93	0.53
Majority		1,374	10.44	−12.34
Turnout		13,282	84.04	−9.10
Registered electors		15,805		

=== 1938 election ===
1938 general election: Lyttelton
Party	Candidate	Votes	%	±%
Labour	Terry McCombs	8,041	61.39	2.68
National	Isaac Wilson	5,057	38.61	
Majority		2,984	22.78	−0.61
Informal votes		53	0.40	−0.19
Turnout		13,151	93.14	7.87
Registered electors		14,120		

=== 1935 election ===
1935 general election: Lyttelton
Party	Candidate	Votes	%	±%
Labour	Terry McCombs	6,965	58.71	0.06
United/Reform	Seton Fulton Marshall	4,190	35.32	
Democrat	Benjamin Henry Riseley	709	5.98	
Majority		2,775	23.39	4.49
Informal votes		71	0.59	
Turnout		11,935	85.27	
Registered electors		13,997		

=== 1935 by-election ===
1935 Lyttelton by-election
Party	Candidate	Votes	%	±%
Labour	Terry McCombs	5,437	58.65	
United/Reform	Melville Lyons	3,685	39.75	
Independent Labour	Edward Hills	103	1.11	
Independent	G.S. Hamilton	46	0.50	
Majority		1752	18.9	−6.75
Turnout		9,271	67.43	

=== 1933 by-election ===
1933 Lyttelton by-election
Party	Candidate	Votes	%	±%
Labour	Elizabeth McCombs	6,344	61.66	11.89
United/Reform	Frederick Freeman	3,675	35.72	−13.76
Independent Labour	Edward Hills	269	2.61	
Majority		2,669	25.94	+25.65
Turnout		10,288	74.98	

=== 1931 election ===
1931 general election: Lyttelton
Party	Candidate	Votes	%	±%
Labour	James McCombs	5,404	49.77	
Reform	Frederick Willie Freeman	5,372	49.47	
Independent	William Ling Page	83	0.76	
Majority		32	0.29	
Informal votes		71	0.65	
Turnout		10,930	86.57	
Registered electors		12,625		

=== 1928 election ===
1928 general election: Lyttelton
Party	Candidate	Votes	%	±%
Labour	James McCombs	5,022	46.53	−3.52
Reform	John Beanland	3,036	28.13	
United	William Thomas Lester	2,734	25.33	
Majority		1,986	18.40	18.29
Informal votes		88	0.81	−0.26
Turnout		10,880	90.27	−0.85
Registered electors		12,053		

=== 1925 election ===
1925 general election: Lyttelton
Party	Candidate	Votes	%	±%
Labour	James McCombs (Note: Melville Lyons was elected for the Reform Party, originally the votes were equal (4900), then a recount found for Lyons. But on appeal his election was declared void on 13 March 1926, and the previous holder, James McCombs, was restored as the electorate representative.)	4,900	50.06	−3.39
Reform	Melville Lyons	4,889	49.94	
Majority		11	0.11	−6.78
Informal votes		106	1.07	−0.19
Turnout		9,895	91.12	0.73
Registered electors		10,859		

=== 1922 election ===
1922 general election: Lyttelton
Party	Candidate	Votes	%	±%
Labour	James McCombs	4,758	53.45	12.27
Reform	Robert Macartney	4,144	46.55	13.30
Majority		614	6.90	−1.03
Informal votes		114	1.26	−0.71
Turnout		9,016	90.40	6.99
Registered electors		9,974		

=== 1919 election ===
1919 general election: Lyttelton
Party	Candidate	Votes	%	±%
Labour	James McCombs	2,999	41.18	−20.31
Reform	Robert Macartney	2,422	33.26	
Liberal	William Thomas Lester	1,277	17.53	
Liberal	Harry Ell	585	8.03	
Majority		577	7.92	−15.06
Informal votes		147	1.98	0.49
Turnout		7,430	83.41	−0.44
Registered electors		8,908		

=== 1914 election ===
1914 general election: Lyttelton
Party	Candidate	Votes	%	±%
Social Democrat	James McCombs	4,276	61.49	9.24
Reform	Malcolm Miller	2,678	38.51	−9.24
Majority		1,598	22.98	18.48
Informal votes		105	1.49	
Turnout		7,059	83.85	
Registered electors		8,419		

=== 1913 by-election ===
1913 Lyttelton by-election: First ballot
Party	Candidate	Votes	%	±%
Social Democrat	James McCombs	2,075	42.20	
Reform	Malcolm Miller	1,560	31.73	
Liberal	James Laurenson	922	18.75	
Independent Liberal	Henry Thacker	263	5.35	
Independent	William Radcliffe	97	1.97	
Turnout		4,917		

1913 Lyttelton by-election: Second ballot
Party	Candidate	Votes	%	±%
Social Democrat	James McCombs	2,628	52.25	
Reform	Malcolm Miller	2,402	47.75	
Majority		226	4.50	
Turnout		5,030		
Social Democrat gain from Liberal		Swing		

=== 1911 election ===
1911 general election: Lyttelton, first ballot
Party	Candidate	Votes	%	±%
Liberal	George Laurenson	4,160	66.66	9.76
Independent Liberal	Colin Cook	2,081	33.34	
Majority		2,079	33.31	19.51
Informal votes		79	1.25	0.47
Turnout		6,320	83.85	0.27
Registered electors		7,537		

=== 1908 election ===
1908 general election: Lyttelton, first ballot
Party	Candidate	Votes	%	±%
Liberal	George Laurenson	3,682	56.90	9.21
Independent Liberal	Henry Thacker	2,789	43.10	
Majority		893	13.80	−7.47
Informal votes		51	0.78	
Turnout		6,522	83.58	−2.92
Registered electors		7,803		

=== 1905 election ===
1905 general election: Lyttelton
Party	Candidate	Votes	%	±%
Liberal	George Laurenson	2,515	47.69	−30.09
Liberal	William Radcliffe	1,393	26.41	
Conservative	Charles Lord Russell	967	18.34	
Conservative	Samuel R. Webb	399	7.57	
Majority		1,122	21.27	−34.28
Informal votes		121	2.24	
Turnout		5,395	86.50	6.15
Registered electors		6,237		

=== 1902 election ===
1902 general election: Lyttelton
Party	Candidate	Votes	%	±%
Liberal	George Laurenson	3,041	77.77	2.50
Liberal	William Rollitt	869	22.23	
Majority		2,172	55.55	5.01
Turnout		3,910	80.35	6.26
Registered electors		4,866		

=== 1899 election ===
1899 general election: Lyttelton
Party	Candidate	Votes	%	±%
Liberal	George Laurenson	2,700	75.27	
Conservative	William Jacques	887	24.73	
Majority		1,813	50.54	
Informal votes				
Registered electors		4,841		
Turnout		3,587	74.10	

=== 1896 election ===
1896 general election: Lyttelton
Party	Candidate	Votes	%	±%
Liberal	John Joyce	1,734	49.83	−18.12
Conservative	William Jacques	1,288	37.01	
Independent Liberal	Samuel R. Webb	458	13.16	
Majority		446	12.82	
Informal votes				
Registered electors		4,285		
Turnout				

=== 1893 election ===
1893 general election: Lyttelton
Party	Candidate	Votes	%	±%
Liberal	John Joyce	1,895	67.95	
Liberal	Edwin Blake	854	30.62	
Independent	John Moncrieff Douglass	40	1.43	
Majority		1,041	37.33	
Informal votes				
Turnout		2,789	77.71	
Registered electors		3,589		

=== 1887 election ===
1887 general election: Lyttelton
Party	Candidate	Votes	%	±%
Independent	John Joyce	613	59.75	
Independent	Harry Allwright	413	40.25	−7.49
Majority		200	19.49	13.67
Turnout		1,026	74.08	−11.05
Registered electors		1,385		

=== 1884 election ===
1884 general election: Lyttelton
Party	Candidate	Votes	%	±%
Independent	Harry Allwright	328	47.74	13.35
Independent	Samuel R. Webb	288	41.92	9.25
Independent	E. M. Clissold	71	10.33	
Majority		40	5.82	4.36
Turnout		687	85.13	5.87
Registered electors		807		

=== 1881 election ===
1881 general election: Lyttelton
Party	Candidate	Votes	%	±%
Independent	Harry Allwright	259	34.40	−17.78
Independent	Edward Richardson	248	32.93	
Independent	Samuel R. Webb	246	32.67	
Majority		11	1.46	−2.89
Turnout		753	79.26	−1.47
Registered electors		950		

=== 1879 election ===
1879 general election: Lyttelton
Party	Candidate	Votes	%	±%
Independent	Harry Allwright	192	52.17	
Independent	Hugh Murray-Aynsley	176	47.83	−8.68
Majority		16	4.35	−8.66
Informal votes		5	1.34	
Turnout		373	80.74	4.34
Registered electors		462		

=== 1875 election ===
1875 general election: Lyttelton
Party	Candidate	Votes	%	±%
Independent	Hugh Murray-Aynsley	139	56.50	7.98
Independent	Henry Richard Webb	107	43.50	−7.98
Majority		32	13.01	10.06
Turnout		246	76.40	
Registered electors		322		

=== 1873 by-election ===
1873 Lyttelton by-election
Party	Candidate	Votes	%	±%
Independent	Henry Richard Webb	122	51.48	
Independent	Hugh Murray-Aynsley	115	48.52	
Turnout		237		
Majority		7	2.95	

=== 1866 election ===
1866 general election: Town of Lyttelton
Party	Candidate	Votes	%	±%
Independent	Edward Hargreaves	107	60.80	
Independent	Henry Sewell	69	39.20	
Majority		38	21.59	
Turnout		176	48.09	
Registered electors		366		

=== 1853 election ===
1853 general election: Town of Lyttelton
Party	Candidate	Votes	%	±%
Independent	James FitzGerald	55	55.0%	
Independent	Christopher Edward Dampier	45	45.0%	
Majority		10	10.0%	
Turnout		100	80.0%	
Registered electors		125		
