= 1867 Lyttelton by-election =

New Zealand by-election

The 1867 Lyttelton by-election was a by-election held on 1 July 1867 during the 4th New Zealand Parliament in the Canterbury electorate of Lyttelton.

The by-election was caused by the resignation of the incumbent MP Edward Hargreaves.

The by-election was won by George Macfarlan. Another candidate—George Agar—was proposed, but did not find a seconder, hence Macfarlan was declared elected.
