= 1975 Special Honours (New Zealand) =

Awards list for New Zealand

The 1975 Special Honours in New Zealand were two Special Honours Lists, published on 18 April and 26 November 1975, respectively, in which New Zealand's outgoing high commissioner to the United Kingdom and a New Zealand-born scientist received knighthoods.

== Knight Bachelor ==
- The Honourable Terence Henderson McCombs OBE ED – lately New Zealand high commissioner in the United Kingdom.
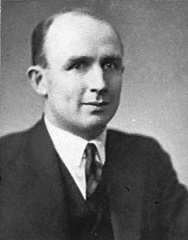
Sir Terry McCombs

== Order of the British Empire ==
=== Knight Commander (KBE) ===
Civil division, honorary

- Dr William Hayward Pickering – of Pasadena, California. For outstanding services to science.
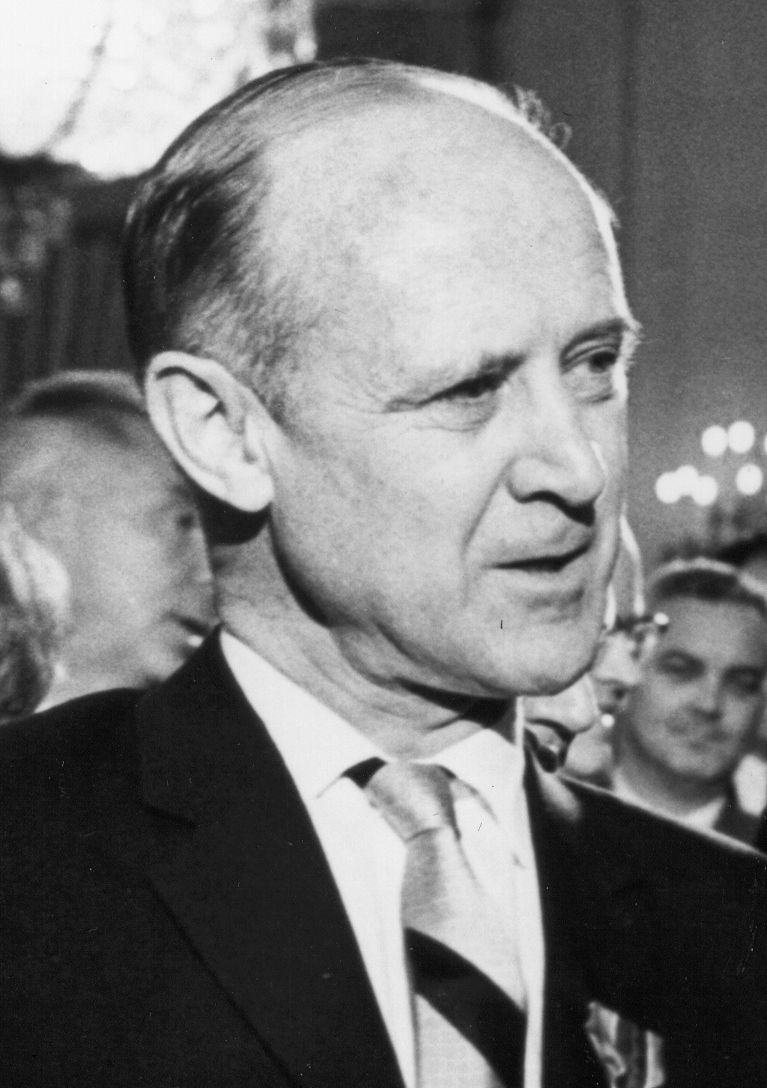
Bill Pickering
