= Gail McIntosh =

New Zealand politician (1955–2018)

Gail Helen McIntosh (1955 – 4 January 2018) was a New Zealand politician of the National Party.

== Professional career ==
McIntosh was an accountant. She lived in Tauranga, with her own accounting practice Gail McIntosh Accountants Ltd.

== Political career ==
New Zealand Parliament
Years	Term	Electorate	Party
1990–1993	43rd	Lyttelton	National

In the 1989 local elections, McIntosh stood in the Papanui ward of Christchurch City Council as part of the United Citizens ticket. She came fifth of six candidates in the ward that returned two councillors.

McIntosh represented the electorate of Lyttelton in Parliament from 1990 to 1993. She was one of six one-term National MPs who were elected in a swing against Labour in the 1990 election. She was a challenger to Winston Peters for the National nomination in Tauranga. She was unsuccessful and left parliament at the 1993 election though stated her intention to eventually return to politics.

In 1993, McIntosh was awarded the New Zealand Suffrage Centennial Medal.

In the 1996 election, McIntosh stood for the United New Zealand party in the Coromandel electorate.

She died on 4 January 2018 after a short illness.

New Zealand Parliament
Preceded by Peter Simpson	Member of Parliament for Lyttelton; 1990–1993	Succeeded by Ruth Dyson
