= Peter Simpson (writer) =

NZ academic, writer and politician (born 1942)

- Simpson in 2004

Member of the New Zealand Parliament for Lyttelton
- In office 15 August 1987 – 27 October 1990
- Preceded by: Ann Hercus
- Succeeded by: Gail McIntosh

Personal details
- Born: 1942 (age 83–84) Tākaka, New Zealand
- Party: Labour
- Children: 2
- Profession: Lecturer

Peter Alan Simpson (born 1942) is a New Zealand academic, writer, literary critic, and former politician of the Labour Party.

== Early life ==
Simpson was born in Tākaka in 1942. From 1955 to 1959, he was educated at Nelson College, where he was a prefect and member of the school's 1st XV rugby union team in his final year. He gained a MA (Hons) from the University of Canterbury, and a PhD from the University of Toronto with a 1975 thesis titled Wordsworth to Hardy: lines of relationship and continuity in nineteenth century English poetry.

== Member of Parliament ==
New Zealand Parliament
Years	Term	Electorate	Party
1987–1990	42nd	Lyttelton	Labour

He represented the electorate of Lyttelton in Parliament from 1987 to 1990, when he was defeated by Gail McIntosh, one of a number of losses contributing to the fall of the Fourth Labour Government.

Before entering parliament he was chairman of the Lyttelton electorate committee of the Labour Party.

== Professional life ==
Simpson had been teaching English since the 1960s at various universities. He was at Massey University, University of Toronto and Carleton University. In his last teaching role, he was at the University of Auckland as associate professor in the Department of English, and head of English, roles from which he retired in 2008.

He is the director of Holloway Press, set up at the University of Auckland in 1994 and named after Ron Holloway (1909–2003), a renowned university printer and publisher.

Simpson received the Prime Minister's Award for Literary Achievement in 2017.

In 2020, Simpson was conferred an honorary Doctor of Letters degree by the University of Canterbury.

== Selected works ==
- Ronald Hugh Morrieson (Oxford University Press, 1982)
- Candles in a Dark Room: James K. Baxter and Colin McCahon (Auckland Art Gallery, 1996)
- Colin McCahon: The Titirangi Years, 1953–1959 (Auckland University Press, 2007)
- Fantastica: The World of Leo Bensemann (Auckland University Press, 2011)
- Bloomsbury South: The Arts in Christchurch 1933–1953 (Auckland University Press, 2016)
- Colin McCahon: There is Only One Direction, Vol. I 1919–1959 (Auckland University Press, 2019)
- Colin McCahon: Is this the Promised Land? Vol. 2 1960–1987 (Auckland University Press, 2020)
- Dear Colin, Dear Ron: The selected letters of Colin McCahon and Ron O'Reilly (Te Papa Press, 2024)

== Private life ==
Simpson lives in Auckland. He is married with two children.

New Zealand Parliament
Preceded by Ann Hercus	Member of Parliament for Lyttelton; 1987–1990	Succeeded by Gail McIntosh
