= George Macfarlan =

New Zealand politician

George Macfarlan (1837/1838 – 9 October 1868) was a New Zealand Member of Parliament representing the Lyttelton electorate.

== Professional career ==
Macfarlan was the only son of the Rev. George Macfarlan of Gainford, County Durham. He was educated at Shrewsbury School before attending Trinity College, Cambridge, where he obtained a "very high degree", passing his final exams in 1860 as fourteenth wrangler.

He moved to London to qualify as a lawyer, and was called to the bar by the Honourable Society of the Inner Temple in June 1863.

Macfarlan came out to Canterbury, New Zealand in January 1864. He was in partnership with William Sefton Moorhouse, prior to Moorhouse being elected Superintendent for the Canterbury Provincial Council in May 1866 for the second time, with their office located in Cathedral Square. After that, he was a solicitor with Macfarlan and Nottidge, also located in the central town square. He was an occasional contributor to the Lyttelton Times.

== Political career ==
New Zealand Parliament
Years	Term	Electorate	Party
1867–1868	4th	Lyttelton	Independent

Macfarlan was elected in a 1 July 1867 by-election following the resignation of Edward Hargreaves. He represented the electorate for just over one year until his death.

== Death ==
He died at the Wellington Club in Wellington from a fever at the young age of 30 years. He was buried at the Bolton Street Cemetery in Wellington. His funeral was attended by about 30 Members of both Houses of Parliament. His grave, together with a large area of the Bolton Street Cemetery, was removed in the late 1960s / early 1970s to make way for the Wellington Urban Motorway. Macfarlan was not married.

New Zealand Parliament
Preceded by Edward Hargreaves	Member of Parliament for Lyttelton; 1867–1868	Succeeded by John Thomas Peacock
