= United–Reform coalition Government of New Zealand =

Government of New Zealand, 1931–1935

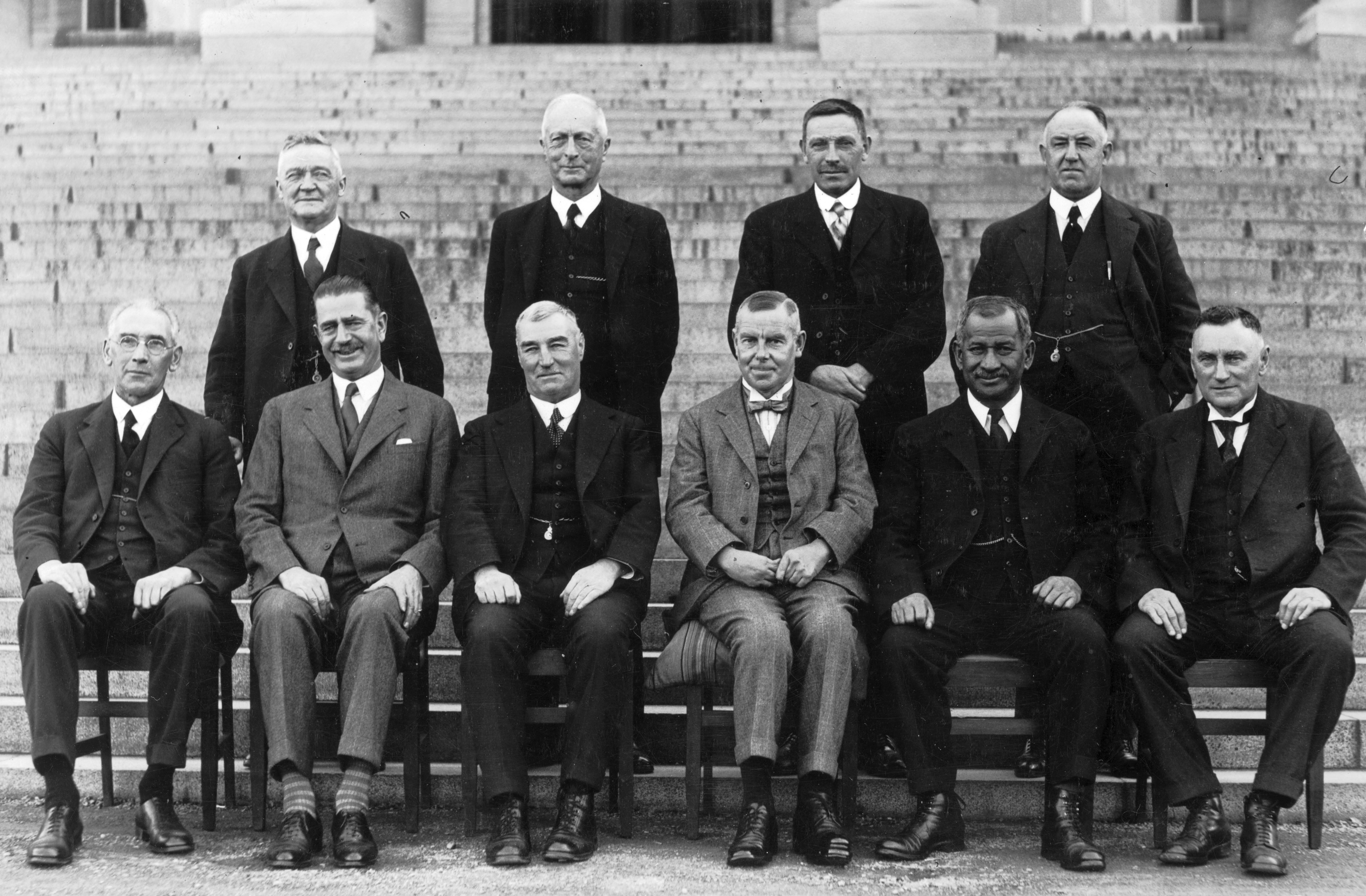
The 1931 Cabinet: Front row (L-R): Ransom, Coates, Forbes, Stewart, Ngata and Young. Back row (L-R): Jones, Cobbe, Hamilton and Masters.

The United–Reform coalition government of New Zealand was the ministry that governed New Zealand from 1931 to 1935. It was New Zealand’s first coalition government outside of wartime, when Reform and Liberal had formed a National government in 1915 for that purpose.

The United–Reform Coalition was between two of the three major parties of the time, the United and Reform parties and was formed to deal with the Great Depression which began in 1929. The United Party had formerly been the Liberal Party. Despite having provided confidence support for the United Party in parliament between 1928 and 1931, the Labour Party refused to join the coalition government, as it believed that the only solution to the depression was socialism, which United and Reform did not support. Rather, they attempted to solve the country's economic problems by cutting public spending (austerity). This, the policy of making the unemployed do relief work for the unemployment benefit, and other cost-cutting policies, made the government the most unpopular of its era, and it was defeated in the 1935 election.

== Significant policies ==
=== Economic ===
- Cut government spending in order to balance the budget.
- The Reserve Bank of New Zealand was established in 1934, beginning the first issue of banknotes for the New Zealand Pound.
- Created the Mortgage Corporation of New Zealand in 1935

=== Transport ===
- Introduced the Transport Licensing Act 1931 to regulate land transport; goods transported further than 30 miles (48 km) would require a permit from the New Zealand Railways Department;

=== Welfare ===
- Compelled the unemployed to labour on public works and other activities in exchange for an unemployment benefit.

=== Education ===
- Raised school starting age to six in order to save money.
- Closed teachers' colleges as cost-cutting measure.

== Formation ==
The initial coalition between the United and Reform had formed earlier in 1931, following the collapse of an earlier coalition between the United and Labour. Fearing that splitting the anti-Labour vote would result in a Labour government even if it received fewer votes than United and Reform combined, the two parties formed a coalition and an election agreement. In the subsequent election, the coalition won 55.4% of the popular vote, compared to 34.3% for Labour.

== Defeat ==
The government focussed primarily on getting New Zealand out of the depression by cutting government spending and thus balancing the national budget. It dealt with widespread unemployment by initiating relief work, which involved compelling the unemployed to work on a range of projects ranging from useful public works to pointless activity. The government was widely seen as heartless, encapsulated by the commonly believed but untrue story that in 1932 the Employment Minister Gordon Coates had told a delegation of unemployed men to go and eat grass. In the 1935 election, Labour won 46.1% of the popular vote, while the coalition, since May 1935 in the amalgamated form of the National Political Federation, won only 32.9%. However the result in terms of seats was much more overwhelming, with Labour winning 53 seats to the coalition's 16. A further eleven seats were won by minor parties and independents. Following this defeat, the United and Reform parties merged in May 1936 to become the National Party.

== Election results ==
Election	Parliament	Seats	Total votes	Percentage	Gain (loss)	Seats won	Change	Majority
1931	24th	80	396,004	55.4%		51	-3	11
1935	25th	80		32.9%	-22.5%	16	-35

== Prime ministers ==
The government was led by George Forbes of the United Party, with Gordon Coates of Reform as Minister of Finance.

Prime Ministers of the United–Reform Coalition Government

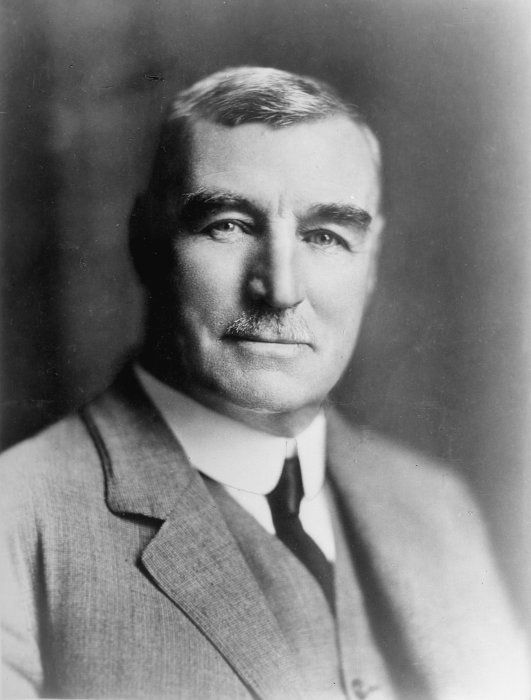
George Forbes
served 1930–1935

== Cabinet Ministers ==
Portfolio	Minister	Party	Start	End
Prime Minister	George Forbes	United	22 September 1931	6 December 1935
Minister of Agriculture	David Jones	Reform	22 September 1931	8 January 1932
Minister of Agriculture	Charles Macmillan	Reform	8 January 1932	6 December 1935
Attorney-General	William Downie Stewart	Reform	22 September 1931	28 January 1933
Attorney-General	George Forbes	United	28 January 1933	6 December 1935
Minister of Customs	William Downie Stewart	Reform	22 September 1931	28 January 1933
Minister of Customs	Gordon Coates	Reform	28 January 1933	6 December 1935
Minister of Defence	John Cobbe	United	22 September 1931	6 December 1935
Minister of Education	Robert Masters	United	22 September 1931	22 November 1934
Minister of Education	Sydney Smith	United	22 November 1934	6 December 1935
Minister of Finance	William Downie Stewart	Reform	22 September 1931	28 January 1933
Minister of Finance	Gordon Coates	Reform	28 January 1933	6 December 1935
Minister of Foreign Affairs	George Forbes	United	22 September 1931	6 December 1935
Commissioner of State Forests	Alfred Ransom	United	22 September 1931	6 December 1935
Minister of Health	Alexander Young	Reform	22 September 1931	6 December 1935
Minister of Immigration	Alexander Young	Reform	22 September 1931	6 December 1935
Minister of Industries and Commerce	Robert Masters	United	22 September 1931	6 December 1935
Minister of Internal Affairs	Adam Hamilton	Reform	22 September 1931	28 January 1933
Minister of Internal Affairs	Alexander Young	Reform	28 January 1933	6 December 1935
Minister of Island Territories	George Forbes	United	22 September 1931	6 December 1935
Minister of Justice	John Cobbe	United	22 September 1931	6 December 1935
Minister of Labour	Adam Hamilton	Reform	22 September 1931	6 December 1935
Minister of Marine	John Cobbe	United	22 September 1931	6 December 1935
Minister of Mines	David Jones	Reform	22 September 1931	8 January 1932
Minister of Mines	Charles Macmillan	Reform	8 January 1932	6 December 1935
Minister of Native Affairs	Āpirana Ngata	United	22 September 1931	1 November 1934
Minister of Native Affairs	George Forbes	United	1 November 1934	6 December 1935
Postmaster-General	Adam Hamilton	Reform	22 September 1931	6 December 1935
Minister of Railways	George Forbes	United	22 September 1931	6 December 1935
Minister of Revenue	William Downie Stewart	Reform	22 September 1931	28 January 1933
Minister of Revenue	Gordon Coates	Reform	28 January 1933	6 December 1935
Minister of Transport	Gordon Coates	Reform	22 September 1931	6 December 1935
Minister of Works	Gordon Coates	Reform	22 September 1931	10 April 1933
Minister of Works	John Bitchener	Reform	10 April 1933	6 December 1935

In 1934 the Minister of Native Affairs Sir Āpirana Ngata resigned as minister after accusations of departmental maladministration and favouritism were supported by a Royal Commission.

== See also ==
- List of New Zealand governments
- New Zealand Liberal Party
- Reform Party (New Zealand)

== References and notes ==
=== References ===
- Bassett, Michael (1982). Three Party Politics in New Zealand 1911-1931. Auckland: Historical Publications. ISBN 0-86870-006-1.
