= Edward Hargreaves =

New Zealand politician (1826–1880)

Member of the New Zealand Parliament for Town of Lyttelton
- In office 3 March 1866 – 24 April 1867
- Preceded by: Crosbie Ward
- Succeeded by: George Macfarlan
- Majority: 38 (21.59%)

Personal details
- Born: Edward Allan Hargreaves; 5 January 1826 Liverpool, England
- Died: 9 March 1880 (aged 54) Timaru, New Zealand

Edward Allan Hargreaves (5 January 1826 – 9 March 1880) was a 19th-century Member of Parliament in Canterbury, New Zealand.

Hargreaves was born in Liverpool in 1826. He came to New Zealand on the Theresa, which left England in November 1843 and landed in New Plymouth on 19 March 1844. Hargreaves was 17 when he left England and with him were his future wife (Ellen Redish, aged 14) and her uncle, William Hickson. Hargreaves and Hickson managed branches of a Liverpool firm in Nelson and Wellington, respectively.

Hargreaves married Redish on 29 April 1851 at St Peter's Church in Te Aro, Wellington. In 1855, Hargreaves moved to Lyttelton and went into a business partnership with Henry Le Cren; they purchased a store facing the Market Place (since renamed Victoria Square) and Market Place became the initial commercial heart of Christchurch. The partnership with Le Cren was dissolved in 1858. Hargreaves was one of the original directors of the Canterbury Steam Navigation Company. He was one of the original members of the Chamber of Commerce in Lyttelton. In February 1863, he went into partnership with his younger brother William.

Hargreaves first stood for election in August 1861, when he contested a seat on the Canterbury Provincial Council for the Town of Lyttelton electorate. Hargreaves was one of six candidates for four available positions, and was successful alongside John Thomas Peacock. In February 1862, Hargreaves won election onto the inaugural Lyttelton municipal council. After announcing that he would stand for re-election for the Provincial Council, Hargreaves withdrew in May 1862. In February 1863, Hargreaves did not stand for re-election to the Lyttelton municipal council. Hargreaves rejoined the municipal council in 1865 and when the incumbent chairman resigned in March 1865, Hargreaves was elected chair by his fellow councillors. When Hargreaves was elected to parliament for the Lyttelton electorate and had to then leave for Wellington in June 1866, he resigned from the municipal council.

New Zealand Parliament
Years	Term	Electorate	Party
1866–1867	4th	Town of Lyttelton	Independent

Hargreaves contested the 1866 general election against the former premier, Henry Sewell, in the Town of Lyttelton electorate. Sewell lived in Christchurch and as the local man, Hargreaves had the backing of the voters with 107 votes to 69. It was an unusual election as Hargreaves was ill during the whole campaign. He had come forward as a candidate but with his condition not improving, he withdrew again. Sewell, who was travelling, then consented to become a candidate on the condition that he would not be opposed. On the morning of the nomination day, Hargreaves consented again to become a candidate. Crosbie Ward spoke on behalf of Hargreaves while James FitzGerald spoke on behalf of Sewell. Hargreaves represented the electorate until 24 April 1867, when he resigned. He was succeeded by George Macfarlan.

Hargreaves died at his residence at West Town Belt in Timaru on 9 March 1880. His wife, who lived in Timaru, died in Christchurch on 7 September 1913.

== Notes ==
New Zealand Parliament
Preceded by Crosbie Ward	Member of Parliament for Lyttelton; 1866–1867	Succeeded by George Macfarlan
