= Elizabeth McCombs =

New Zealand politician (1873–1935)

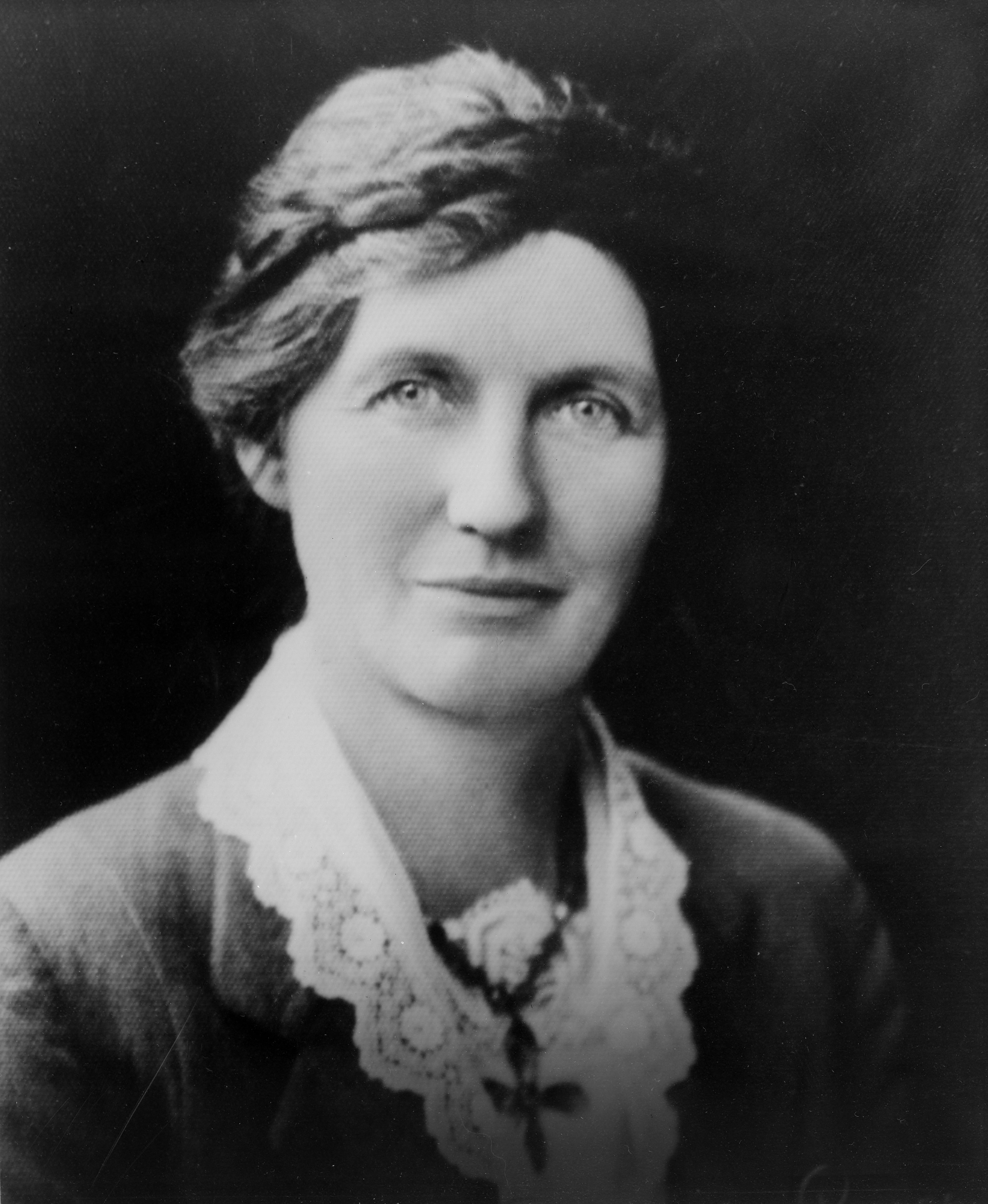
- Elizabeth Reid McCombs c. 1933

Member of the New Zealand Parliament for Lyttelton
- In office 13 September 1933 – 7 June 1935
- Preceded by: James McCombs
- Succeeded by: Terry McCombs

Personal details
- Born: Elizabeth Reid Henderson; 19 November 1873 Kaiapoi, New Zealand
- Died: 7 June 1935 (aged 61) Christchurch, New Zealand
- Party: Labour
- Spouse: James McCombs (married 1903)
- Relations: Christina Henderson (sister); Stella Henderson (sister)
- Children: Four children (two were adopted), incl. Terry McCombs

Elizabeth Reid McCombs (née Henderson, 19 November 1873 – 7 June 1935) was a New Zealand politician of the Labour Party who in 1933 became the first woman elected to the New Zealand Parliament. New Zealand women gained the right to vote in 1893, though were not allowed to stand for the House of Representatives until the election of 1919. McCombs had previously contested elections in 1928 and 1931.

== Early years ==
McCombs was born in Kaiapoi, North Canterbury, New Zealand. She was one of the nine children of Alice and Daniel Henderson. The family spent some years living in Ashburton, but in about 1882 the family moved to Christchurch. A passion for activism was embedded in her family, as some of her siblings were notable activists themselves. Two of McCombs' sisters, Stella Henderson and Christina Kirk Henderson, were both in the public eye; Stella writing for a prominent New Zealand newspaper, and Christina advocating for the suffrage movement.

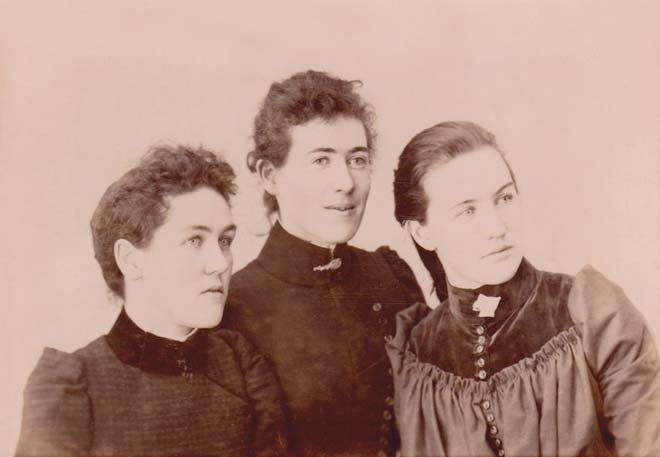
Stella, Kathleen and Elizabeth (then) Henderson in the 1890s

In 1886, her alcoholic father died, leaving her family in financial difficulty for a time.

== Politics ==
New Zealand Parliament
Years	Term	Electorate	Party
1933–1935	24th	Lyttelton	Labour

McCombs became interested in socialism through the influence of her elder sisters, who were involved in the Progressive Liberal Association, a small socialist-orientated group. One of the Progressive Liberal Association's goals was to increase the political rights of women. McCombs herself became involved in the Association, and as an extension of this, with the New Zealand Women's Christian Temperance Union, run by prominent New Zealand suffragist Kate Sheppard. McCombs held a number of positions within the Temperance Union throughout her life, including that of national treasurer.

In 1903, McCombs married James McCombs, a strong socialist who had also been involved with the Progressive Liberal Association. They were to have two children, and adopted two more. James McCombs was active in left-wing political circles, and was later to become an MP for the Social Democratic Party. When the Labour Party was founded in 1916, he became its first president. At the same time, Elizabeth McCombs was elected to the party's executive, alongside another woman, Sarah Snow.

In 1921, McCombs gained election to the Christchurch City Council, being the second woman to do so. She remained a member of the council until 1935, when she chose to step down. During this time, she was also active in a large number of other organisations, including hospital boards and charities. Her work was recognised in 1926, when she was made a Justice of the peace.

In the 1928 elections, McCombs stood (unsuccessfully) for the Kaiapoi electorate, as the Labour Party's first female nominee. In the 1931 elections, she contested the seat of Christchurch North, also unsuccessfully.

=== Parliamentary career ===
On the death in August 1933 of McCombs' husband James, who had held his parliamentary seat of Lyttelton since 1913, it was suggested that Elizabeth McCombs herself should be the Labour Party's new candidate for the Lyttelton seat. Some members of the party were initially hesitant, but she was eventually selected as the Labour candidate. When the 1933 by-election was held on 13 September, McCombs won resoundingly: James had been returned by only 32 votes in the 1931 elections, but Elizabeth received a majority of 2600 votes, electing her the first woman Member of Parliament.

She made her maiden speech on 28 September.

=== Issues ===
In parliament, McCombs spoke out on a number of issues, many of which involved women's rights and welfare. Among the causes she promoted were:

- Equal pay for women.
- Changes to unemployment policy, which was more generous towards unemployed men than unemployed women.
- Recruitment of women into the police force.
- Raising the age of marriage (then 12 for girls and 14 for boys).

In a 1926 article in Christchurch newspaper The Press, McCombs was described as being "impatient with working people, tending to represent their best interests and not necessarily their opinions. She called a deputation representing the unemployed "an illogical crowd" when they said they wanted work but criticised having to work for charitable aid."

== Illness and death ==
Increasingly poor health made it difficult for McCombs to participate fully in politics. She died in Christchurch on 7 June 1935 aged 61, less than two years after entering parliament.

In 1935, she was awarded the King George V Silver Jubilee Medal. Despite her short career in parliament, she demonstrated that women could successfully seek election, and it was not long before a second woman (Catherine Stewart in 1938, elected for Wellington West) entered parliament. In her Lyttelton electorate, she was succeeded by her son Terry McCombs, who was the Minister of Education in the First Labour Government from 1947 to 1949. Terry McCombs held the Lyttelton seat until 1951, concluding a 38-year family hold on the seat.

== Bibliography ==
- Gee, David (1993). My Dear Girl: A biography of Elizabeth and James McCombs. Christchurch: Treehouse. ISBN 0-473-02084-X.
- Elizabeth McCombs is the main character in the play Women Like Us (1993), commissioned by the Suffrage Centenary Trust and written by Helen Varley Jamieson.
- Wilson, Jim (1985) [First published in 1913]. New Zealand Parliamentary Record, 1840–1984 (4th ed.). Wellington: V.R. Ward, Govt. Printer. OCLC 154283103.
- Biography in 1966 Encyclopaedia of New Zealand
- Obituary in The Press, 8 June 1935 by James Oakley Wilson, Chief Librarian, General Assembly Library, Wellington
- Women in Parliamentary Life 1970–1990: Hocken Lecture 1993 by Marilyn Waring, pp. 32–33 (Hocken Library, University of Otago, 1994) ISBN 0-902041-61-4

New Zealand Parliament
Preceded by James McCombs	Member of Parliament for Lyttelton; 1933–1935	Succeeded by Terry McCombs
