= Christina Henderson =

NZ teacher, feminist, prohibitionist, social reformer, editor

Christina Kirk Henderson
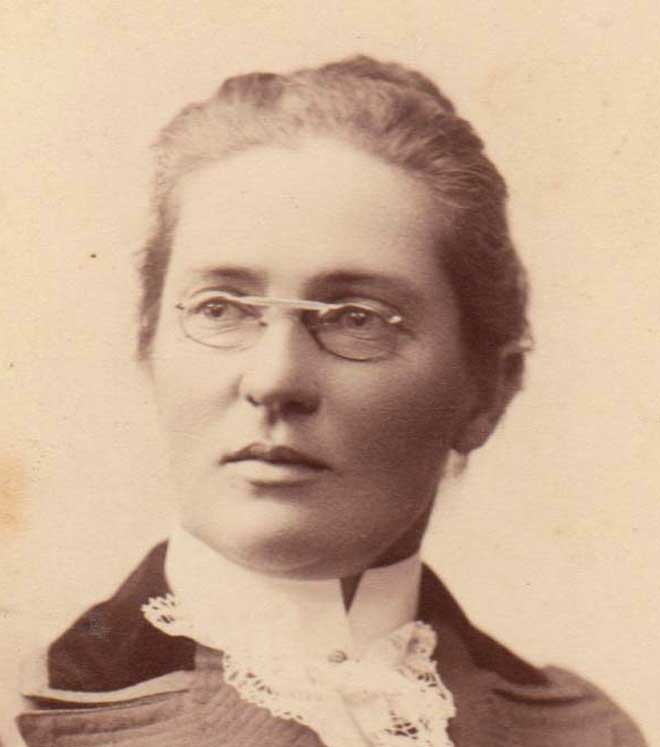
- Christina Henderson
- Born: 15 August 1861; Melbourne, Australia
- Died: 27 September 1953 (aged 92); Christchurch, New Zealand
- Education: Canterbury College
- Relatives: Elizabeth McCombs (sister); Stella Henderson (sister)

Christina Kirk Henderson (15 August 1861 – 27 September 1953) was a New Zealand teacher, feminist, prohibitionist, social reformer and editor.

== Early life ==
Henderson was born in Emerald Hill, Melbourne, Victoria, Australia on 15 August 1861, one of nine children of Alice and Daniel Henderson. The family moved to Kaiapoi, North Canterbury, New Zealand, and later Ashburton before settling in Christchurch. When she was young – "barely in her teens" – she became an unpaid pupil-teacher at Ashburton School. She then won a scholarship to Christchurch Normal School to continue her training. Once she had completed her certificates she was briefly headmistress of the Normal School. Henderson taught at Springston School in rural Canterbury from 1883 to 1885, and continued to study in the evenings and weekends through Canterbury College for a Bachelor of Arts degree; she graduated in 1891.

== Career ==
From 1886 to 1912, Henderson was a staff member at Christchurch Girls' High School. She taught Latin and English and became first assistant in 1889; she also served as acting principal in 1898.

Henderson was involved in a number of social justice causes. She campaigned for equal pay for women teachers from the beginning of her career, and started the Canterbury Women Teachers' Association. She fought for women's suffrage, and was a foundation member of the National Council of Women in 1896. Founded in 1901, Henderson also served as the first president of the Association of Women Teachers, aiming towards equal pay and increasing the status of female educators. She also campaigned for temperance and was involved with the Christchurch Prohibition League and the Woman's Christian Temperance Union, serving as president of the Christchurch branch of the WCTU from 1926 until 1946.

Influenced by her sister Alice's extensive missionary work, she was involved with the Presbyterian Women's Missionary Union of New Zealand, serving as secretary from 1917 to 1920, and then as president from 1930 to 1932. From 1923 until 1946, Henderson was the editor of the organisation's magazine, the Harvest Field, for more than twenty years. Furthermore, Henderson was one of New Zealand's first women Justices of the Peace.

After a lifetime commitment to social reform and justice, Christina Henderson died at 92 years of age on 27 September 1953 in the Public Hospital, Christchurch.

== Family ==
Several of Henderson's siblings were also notable – her sister Stella was a journalist and the first woman parliamentary reporter for a major New Zealand newspaper; another sister, Elizabeth, became New Zealand's first woman Member of Parliament. A third sister, Alice, was a Presbyterian missionary in India, and her brother Alexander became editor of the Christchurch Star-Sun newspaper.
