= Stella Henderson =

New Zealand feminist, journalist

Stella May Henderson
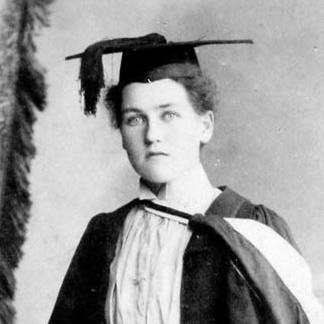
- Henderson at the time of her graduation in 1893
- Born: 25 October 1871; Kaiapoi, New Zealand
- Died: 1 March 1962 (aged 90); Melbourne, Australia
- Other name: Mrs E. F. Allan
- Education: Canterbury College
- Known for: First woman Parliamentary newspaper reporter in New Zealand
- Spouse: Edwin Frank Allan
- Children: Four daughters
- Relatives: Elizabeth McCombs (sister); Christina Henderson (sister)

Stella May Henderson (25 October 1871 – 1 March 1962), also known as Mrs E. F. Allan and the journalistic pen name of Vesta, was a New Zealand feminist, university graduate and journalist. She was a founding member in 1896 of the National Council of Women of New Zealand and later of the National Council of Women of Australia. She was the first woman parliamentary reporter for a major New Zealand newspaper. Henderson was also a 1924 delegate to the League of Nations assembly in Geneva.

== Early life and education ==
Henderson was born in Kaiapoi, North Canterbury, New Zealand on 25 October 1871. She was the seventh of nine children of Alice and Daniel Henderson. The family spent some years living in Ashburton, but when Henderson was 11 the family moved to Christchurch.

She attended Christchurch Girls' High School when Helen Connon was principal, and won a Junior Scholarship to Canterbury College in 1888. She completed both a Bachelor of Arts degree and a Master of Arts degree, graduating with first class honours in English and Latin in 1893.

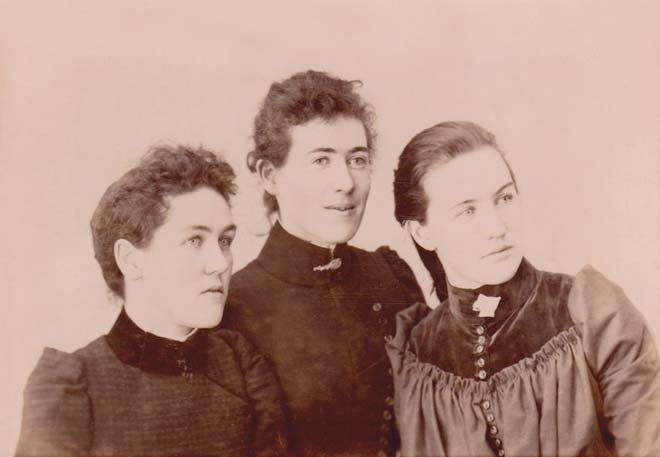
Stella, Kathleen and Elizabeth Henderson in the 1890s

Henderson was initially interested in a career in law, although women were not permitted to practise law at the time. With the help of William Izard, who employed her, she began working in a law firm while attending classes at Canterbury College. Izard subsequently approached the local member of parliament, G.W. Russell, to introduce a private member's bill to Parliament to enable women to qualify as barristers and solicitors. The legislation, the Female Law Practitioners Act, was passed in 1896 and Henderson passed her final LLB exams in 1898.

Throughout this period, Henderson was developing her political views. She and her sisters Elizabeth and Christina joined a socialist group, as well as the National Council of Women, and signed the petition for women's suffrage that won New Zealand women the vote in 1893. All three sisters were also strong supporters of the Prohibition movement, as their father Daniel had died when the family was still young due to alcoholism.

== Journalism career ==
New Zealand

Just as Henderson was about to begin a career in law, she was offered a position as parliamentary correspondent for the Lyttelton Times newspaper. Her speeches and papers for the small political group she was involved with had been fully reported on for some time in the newspaper, and it was the editor, Samuel Saunders, who offered her the position. Saunders wrote to the president of the Press Gallery committee to inform him that the seats allocated to his newspaper in the gallery and the press room would be used by Henderson. However, the president asked the members of the gallery to vote on whether a woman should be allowed to join them, and members voted against her admittance. Unperturbed, Henderson bought a permanent ticket to the Ladies Gallery at Parliament and proceeded to write notes on her knees, write reports in the ladies tearoom, and telegraph her reports to her editor each evening. The male reporters continued to vocally oppose Henderson's presence, but her employers complained that their exclusion of her from the Press Gallery restricted their right to hire whomever they chose as their parliamentary reporter. The National Council of Women also supported Henderson; they approached the Speaker of the House, Sir Maurice O'Rorke, and pressured him to allow Henderson into the Press Gallery.

After intervention from the Reporting and Debates Committee of the House, a section of the Ladies Gallery was converted into a press gallery for her use. Henderson continued to report from parliament for two years. She resigned her position on her marriage, as her new husband was a reporter for a conservative newspaper while the Lyttelton Times supported the Liberals. The couple felt they could not both continue to report for such politically opposed publications.

Melbourne

Instead, Henderson became New Zealand correspondent for the Brisbane Courier newspaper and in September 1903 the couple moved to Melbourne. Her husband had accepted a lead writing position with the Melbourne Argus. The following year, Henderson began working for Argus too. Initially she wrote book reviews, and in 1907 was commissioned to write a series of articles on the first Australian Women's Work Exhibition in October. In 1908 she began writing a weekly column called "Woman to Woman" under the pen-name "Vesta", in which she gave advice and information on community issues and women's and children's issues, and community welfare.

Henderson also joined the Women Writers' Club there, and later she succeeded Ada Cambridge as president. She was one of three women founding members of the Australian Journalists' Association. In 1912 she helped found the Lyceum Club, later becoming its president.

In 1927 she was part of Victorian state council for Girl Guides.

League of Nations

In July 1924, Henderson was the Australian substitute delegate to the fifth assembly of League of Nations, being conducted in Geneva, Switzerland.

England

In 1939 Henderson retired to England and wrote for The Argus on women's and children's experiences of World War II.

Australia

In 1947 she returned to Melbourne and lived there until her death in March 1962.

== Recognition ==
Vesta Place, in the Canberra suburb of Gilmore, is named in her honour.

Henderson is also recognised as part of the Australian Media Hall of Fame.

== Personal life and family ==
Several of Henderson's siblings were also notable, Elizabeth became New Zealand's first woman Member of Parliament, and Christina was a teacher and social activist.

In 1900 Henderson married Edwin Frank Allan, who was a writer at the Evening Post newspaper. Allan had been a former diplomat at the British Embassy in Peking before ill-health brought a change towards journalism. They had four daughters Helen Mary, Frances Elizabeth, Stella Patricia Grace and Alice Margaret.

Daughter Alice married military officer and religious minister Alexander Rowan Macneil (1894–1953) at St Paul's Cathedral, Melbourne on 7 August 1923.

Daughter Frances ("Betty"; d. August 1952) was a distinguished mathematician, established the statistical section of the [CSIRO] in 1931, and married scientist Dr Patrick Calvert and resided in Canberra.
