= James McCombs =

New Zealand politician (1873–1933)

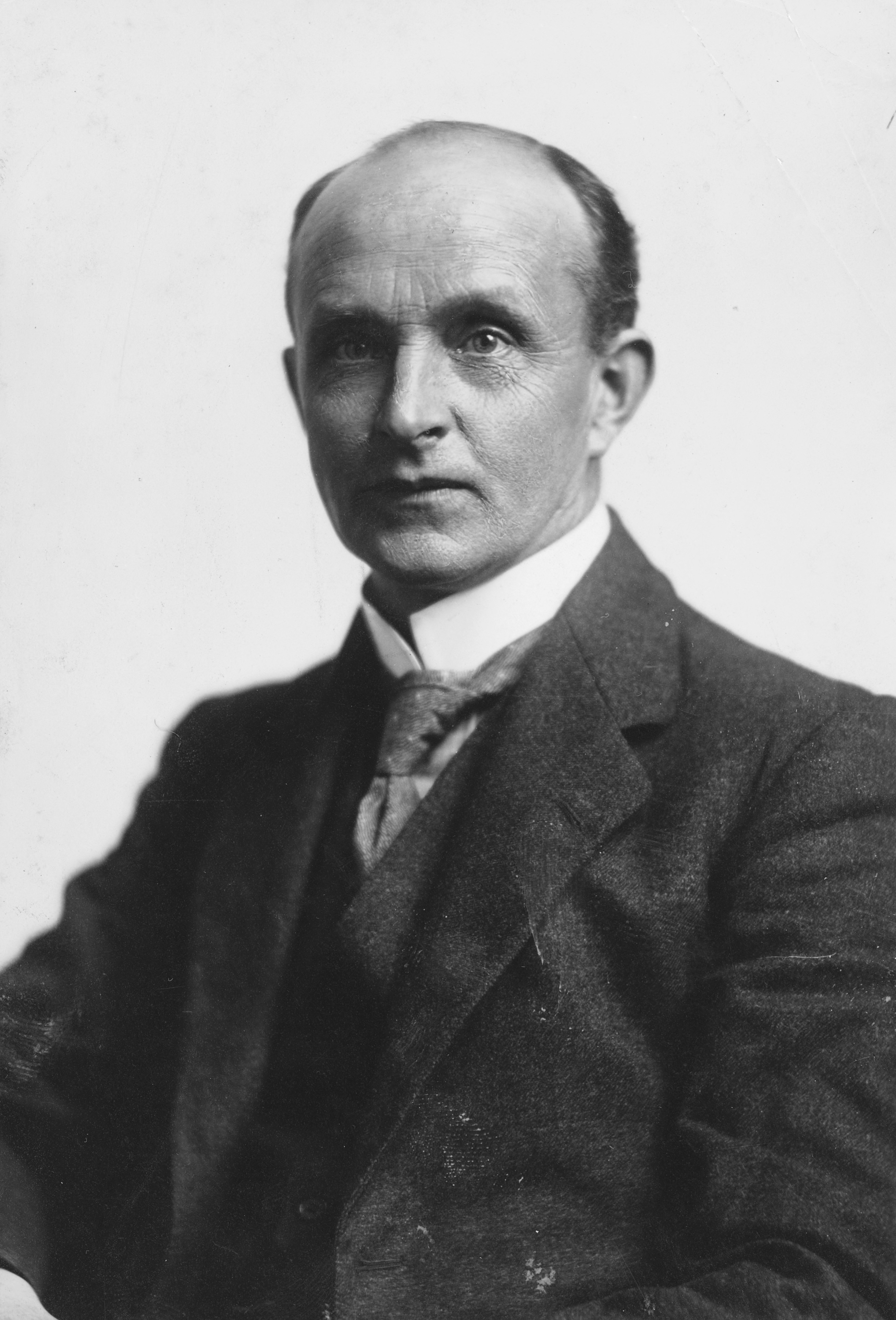
- James McCombs between 1920 and 1925

1st Deputy Leader of the Labour Party
- In office 27 August 1919 – 7 February 1923
- Leader: Harry Holland
- Succeeded by: Michael Joseph Savage

1st President of the Labour Party
- In office 7 July 1916 – 9 July 1917
- Vice President: Andrew Walker
- Leader: Alfred Hindmarsh
- Succeeded by: Andrew Walker

Member of the New Zealand Parliament for Lyttelton
- In office 16 December 1913 – 2 August 1933
- Preceded by: George Laurenson
- Succeeded by: Elizabeth McCombs

Personal details
- Born: 9 December 1873 County Leitrim, Ireland
- Died: 2 August 1933 (aged 59) Christchurch
- Party: Labour
- Other political affiliations: Social Democrat; Liberal
- Spouse: Elizabeth McCombs (married 1903)
- Children: Four (two of which were adopted), incl. Terry McCombs

James (Jimmy) McCombs (9 December 1873 – 2 August 1933) was a New Zealand Member of Parliament for Lyttelton.

== Biography ==
=== Early life and career ===
McCombs was born in Treanmore, Mohill, County Leitrim, Ireland, the elder child of George McCombs, a farmer, and his wife, Kate Rourke. He came to New Zealand with his parents in 1876 as a three-year-old. He was educated at Sydenham School and Christchurch East School. Initially he intended to join the ministry of the Anglican Church but later decided to cease theological studies and give his time to social work instead. He still remained involved in the Anglican Church and was an active member of the Church of England Men's Society and, inspired by his religious beliefs, he became a prohibitionist and became a leading member of the prohibitionist movement in Canterbury. He believed that the aims of the Christian Socialism in which he believed were better expressed via community and political activities.

Through his community work McCombs met the like-minded Elizabeth Henderson. Henderson was the president of the Young People's No License League of which McCombs became a committee member of. On 25 June 1903 the two married and had a son and daughter together.

McCombs became a successful businessman, owning and operating a drapery in Christchurch. He became a trade unionist and was elected president of the Drapers' Assistants Union. Regarded as a moderate among the union movement, he was regarded by liberal newspapers as representing "sane labour". McCombs also spent time speculating in property. In several areas in and around Christchurch he bought and sold land, the transactions that were not always profitable however and gradually the grounds of his family home in Fendalton were subdivided and sold to repay debts.

=== Local political involvement ===
McCombs was involved in the temperance movement (with Tommy Taylor), the Progressive Liberal Association (with Harry Ell) and was a friend of George Laurenson. He became a member of the Liberal Party and in the 1890s he organised election campaigns for both Taylor and Ell. McCombs served on the Christchurch City Council between 1913 and 1917 and again from 1931 until 1933. During his second spell on the council (where Labour had a majority) McCombs chaired the finance committee. He reduced rates and protected council employees from any further wage cuts in an attempt to both dampen unemployment and stimulate the economy of the city. Neither outcome was successfully achieved however.

McCombs twice stood for Mayor of Christchurch. He contested the 1917 mayoral election against the incumbent, Henry Holland, along the lines of win-the-war (Holland) and anti-conscription (McCombs). The result was a crushing defeat of McCombs; Holland received 12,177 votes and McCombs received 5,381. Holland retired from the mayoralty in 1919; the election was contested by three candidates: Henry Thacker, John Joseph Dougall (Mayor of Christchurch 1911–1912) and McCombs (who at that time was MP for Lyttelton). Thacker won the contest, and McCombs came last.

=== Member of Parliament ===
New Zealand Parliament
Years	Term	Electorate	Party
1913–1914	18th	Lyttelton	Social Democrat
1914–1916	19th	Lyttelton	Social Democrat
1916	Changed allegiance to:		Labour
1917	Changed allegiance to:		Independent Labour
1918–1919	Changed allegiance to:		Labour
1919–1922	20th	Lyttelton	Labour
1922–1925	21st	Lyttelton	Labour
1926–1928	22nd	Lyttelton	Labour
1928–1931	23rd	Lyttelton	Labour
1931–1933	24th	Lyttelton	Labour

In the 1908 election, McCombs stood in Christchurch East as an Independent Liberal candidate; at the 1911 contest for Avon he was a Liberal-Labour candidate polling 2,817 votes to the official Labour candidate's 798 on the first ballot. In the second ballot he was endorsed as the official Labour candidate, but lost to George Russell.

James McCombs represented the Lyttelton electorate for 20 years from the 1913 by-election (following the death of George Laurenson). McCombs found it difficult to support a family and maintain homes in Wellington and Christchurch on a MP's salary of £8.10.0 a week. Once when rushing to get the ferry home, his suitcase flew open and several rolls of toilet paper fell out. Subsequently, Parliament got toilet paper in paper squares instead of rolls.

McCombs was part of the committee which drafted the founding constitution and programme of the New Zealand Labour Party in 1916. He then became inaugural president of the Labour Party. The following year, he resigned the presidency and his membership of the Labour Party over the state control of liquor issue. After rejoining the party in 1918, McCombs served as Labour's deputy leader from 1919 until 1923. When Labour's caucus leader Alfred Hindmarsh died during the Influenza epidemic, Labour's leadership was open. McCombs made claim to the title but was opposed by the more militant Harry Holland. The caucus held an election to decide between the two. The result was a tie. After drawing lots, Holland was successful. During the 1920s McCombs with Dan Sullivan led the opposition to Harry Holland within the Parliamentary Labour Party caucus attempting several leadership challenges, all of which were unsuccessful.

After the confusion following the 1922 general election McCombs was nominated by Holland (partly for political reasons) for the role of speaker, though lost to Reform's candidate Charles Statham 61 votes to 17. The 1925 general election was contested by Melville Lyons and the incumbent, McCombs. The original count resulted in a tie of 4,900 votes each. The returning officer gave his casting vote to Lyons and declared him elected. A recount was demanded, and on 3 December 1925, an amended result of 4,890 votes for Lyons and 4,884 votes for McCombs was determined, with the differences in the counts explained by counting informal votes in a different way. Lyons' election was declared void on 13 March 1926, and McCombs was restored as the holder of the electorate.

The 1931 election had a close result, with McCombs just 32 votes ahead of the Reform Party candidate, Christchurch civil engineer Frederick Willie Freeman.

McCombs held the electorate until 1933, when he died in office. The electorate was then held by his wife Elizabeth McCombs from 1933 to 1935, and his son Terry McCombs from 1935 to 1951.

=== Death ===
He died at Christchurch on 2 August 1933 from heart failure, and was buried in Waimairi Cemetery.

== Notes ==
New Zealand Parliament
Preceded by George Laurenson	Member of Parliament for Lyttelton; 1913–1925 1926–1933	Succeeded by Melville Lyons
Preceded by Melville Lyons	Member of Parliament for Lyttelton; 1913–1925 1926–1933	Succeeded by Elizabeth McCombs
Party political offices
New political party	President of the Labour Party; 1916–1917	Succeeded by Andrew Walker
Preceded by Andrew Walker	Senior Whip of the Labour Party; 1919–1921	Succeeded by Dan Sullivan
New title	Deputy-Leader of the Labour Party; 1919–1923	Succeeded by Michael Joseph Savage
