= United–Reform Coalition =

United-Reform Coalition
- Leader: George Forbes
- Deputy Leader: Gordon Coates
- Founded: 18 September 1931
- Dissolved: 14 May 1936; 89 years ago
- Merger of: United Party; Reform Party
- Merged into: National Party
- Ideology: Conservatism; Classical liberalism Anti-socialism
- Political position: Centre to centre-right

The United–Reform Coalition, also known as the National Political Federation from May 1935, was a coalition between two of the three major parties of New Zealand, the United and Reform parties, from 1931 to 1936. This United–Reform coalition government of New Zealand was first formed in September 1931 and successfully contested the 1931 general election in December that year. Then in the form of the National Political Federation, the coalition was defeated at the 1935 general election by Labour. In May 1936, United and Reform formally ceased to exist with their members jointly having decided to form a new party, the New Zealand National Party.

Primarily the coalition was formed to deal with the Great Depression which began in 1929. Despite their earlier support of the United government led by Ward and then Forbes, the Labour Party refused to join the coalition, as it believed that the only solution to the depression was socialism.

== History ==
=== Formation ===
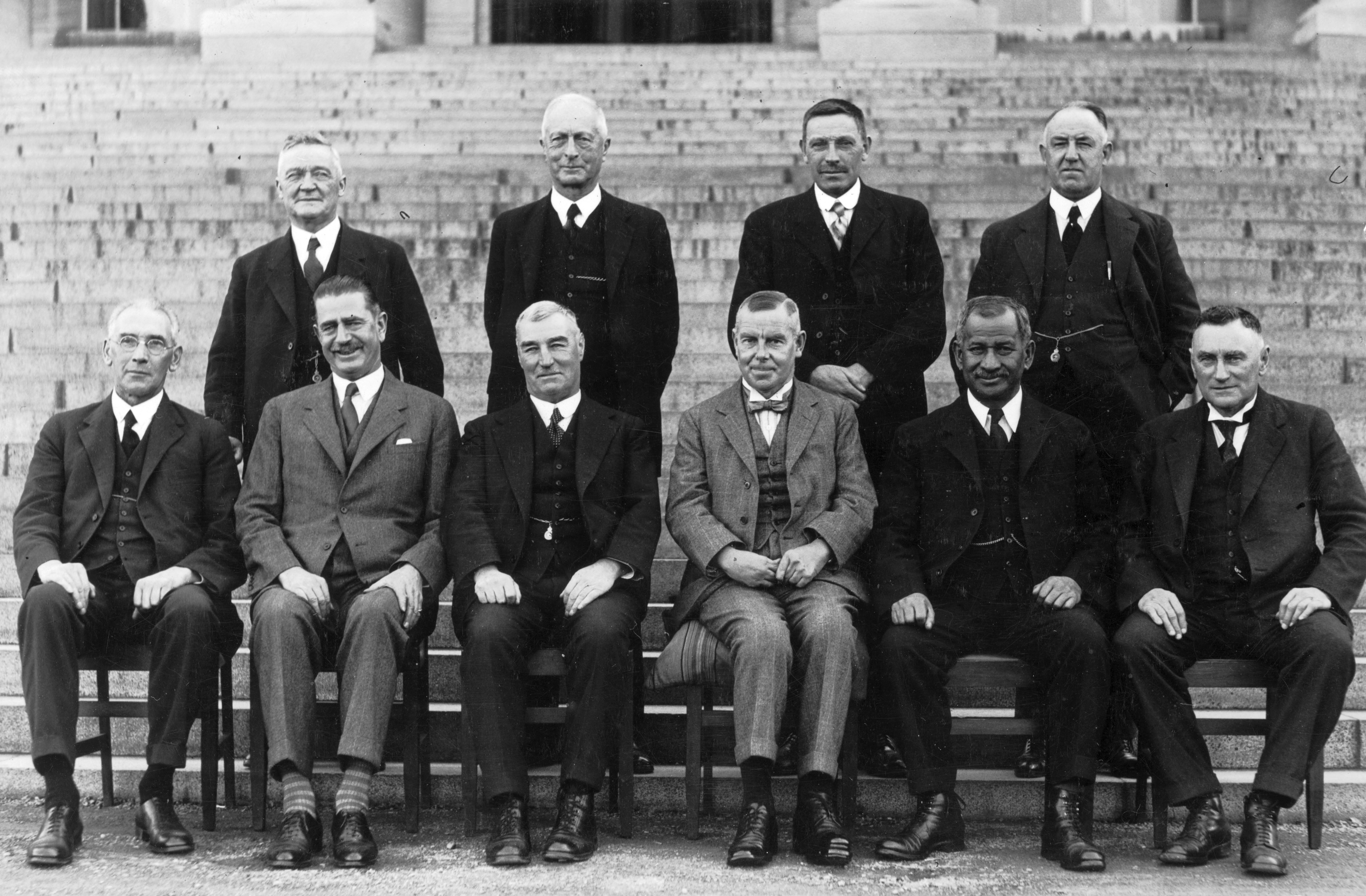
The 1931 Cabinet: Front row (L-R): Ransom, Coates, Forbes, Stewart, Ngata and Young. Back row (L-R): Jones, Cobbe, Hamilton and Masters.

The initial coalition between United and Reform had formed in September 1931, following the collapse of an earlier government support arrangement between United and Labour. Fearing that splitting the anti-Labour vote would result in a Labour government even if it received fewer votes than United and Reform combined, the two centre-right parties formed a coalition and an election agreement. Part of the agreement was that all sitting members who support the coalition would in turn receive the official endorsement as coalition candidate. This pragmatic decision caused trouble in those electorates where the voters were not satisfied with the incumbent's performance, for example in the Wairarapa and Otaki electorates.

In the subsequent election, the coalition won 54.0% of the popular vote, compared to 34.3% for Labour. Although Reform won 28 seats to United's 19, United leader George Forbes remained Prime Minister.

=== Defeat ===
The government focused primarily on getting New Zealand out of the depression by cutting government spending and thus balancing the national budget. It dealt with widespread unemployment by initiating relief work, which involved compelling the unemployed to work on a range of projects ranging from useful public works to pointless activity. The government was widely seen as heartless, encapsulated by the commonly believed but untrue story that in 1932 the employment minister Gordon Coates had told a delegation of unemployed men to go and eat grass. In the 1935 election, Labour won 46.1% of the popular vote, while the coalition won only 32.9%. However the result in terms of seats was an electoral wipeout, with Labour winning 53 seats to the coalition's 16. A further eleven seats were won by minor parties and independents.

Following their defeat, in early 1936 the Dominion Executive of the National Political Federation agreed to a conference being organised, with the aim of forming a new political party. The members of the Dominion Executive were, Sir George Wilson, George Forbes, Gordon Coates, Robert Masters, Fred Waite, Claude Weston, E.E. Hammond, L.O.H. Tripp, and J.J. McGrath. Only Coates objected, telling his fellow Dominion Executive members that he would prefer to wait and see what happened, rather than form a new party. Members of United, Reform and the National Political Federation jointly decided to form a new party in May 1936 in the form of the National Party. The 1931 election and 1935 election showed the hazard of vote-splitting. In 1931 only 24 of 53 electorates where Labour stood had only one anti-Labour candidate: e.g. Auckland West had H. R. Mackenzie from United and John Allum from Reform, who together got little more than half the votes of the winner – Mickey Savage. And in Auckland East there were four anti-Labour candidates and the seat went back to Labour.

== Electoral results ==
| Election | # of votes | % of vote | # of seats won | Government/opposition? |
|---|---|---|---|---|
| 1931 | 386,040 | 54.03 | 51 / 80 | Government |
| 1935 | 285,422 | 33.48 | 19 / 80 | Opposition |

== See also ==
- Governments of New Zealand

== Notes and references ==
=== References ===
- Gustafson, Barry (1986). The First 50 Years : A History of the New Zealand National Party. Auckland: Reed Methuen. ISBN 0-474-00177-6.
- Bassett, Michael (1982). Three Party Politics in New Zealand 1911–1931. Auckland: Historical Publications. ISBN 0-86870-006-1.
