= 1913 Lyttelton by-election =

New Zealand by-election

- 16 December 1913
- Turnout: 5,030
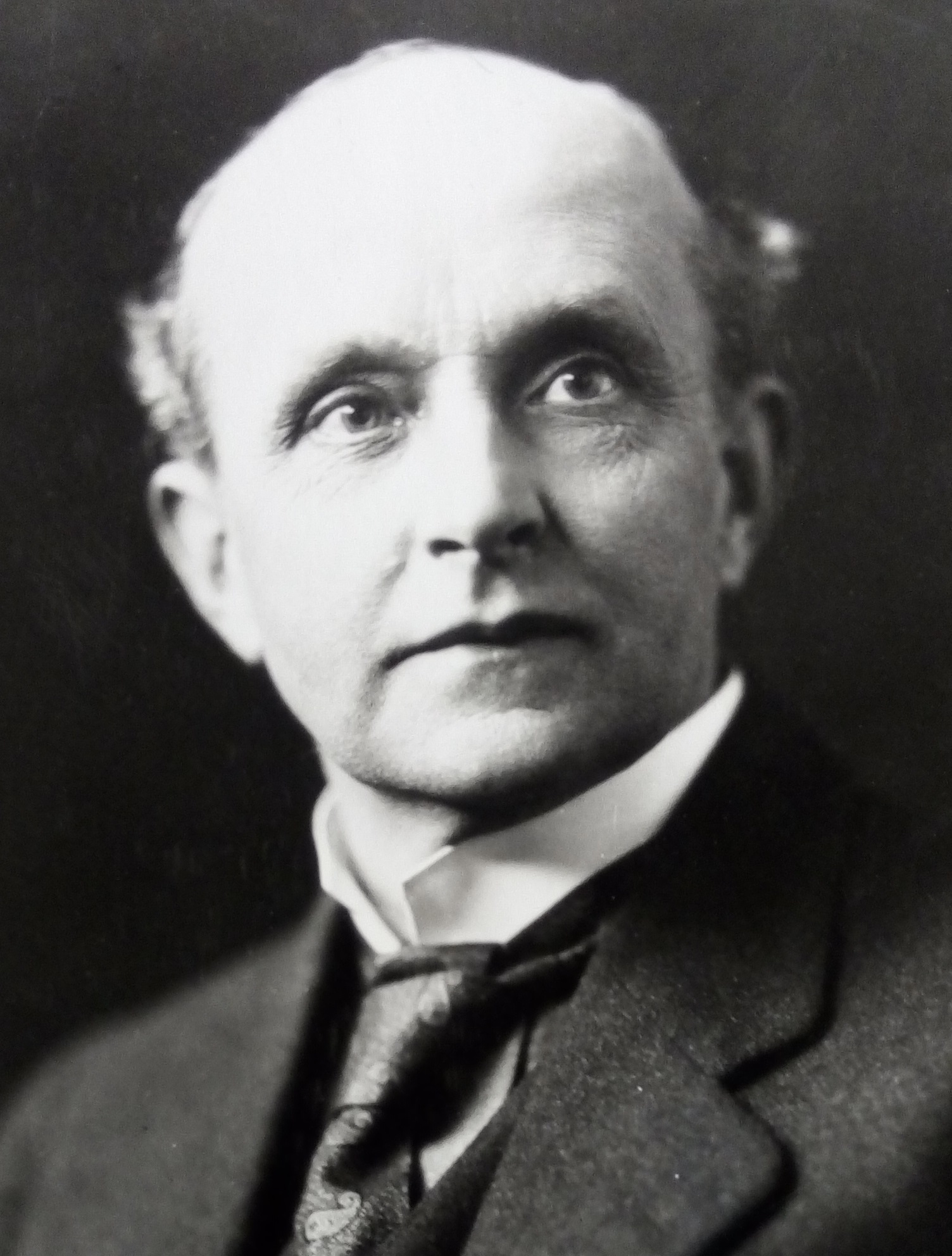

Candidate	James McCombs	Malcolm Miller
Party	Social Democrat	Reform
Popular vote	2,628	2,402
Percentage	52.25%	47.75%
Member before election
George Laurenson
Liberal
Elected Member
James McCombs
Social Democrat

The Lyttelton by-election of 1913 was a by-election during the 18th New Zealand Parliament. As no candidate won an absolute majority on the first ballot on 9 December, a second round was held on 16 December. The seat had become vacant due to the death of sitting MP George Laurenson. Five candidates stood. It was the last by-election in New Zealand to use the Two-round voting system to elect a member.

== Results ==
The following tables give the election results:

=== First ballot ===
1913 Lyttelton by-election: First ballot
Party	Candidate	Votes	%	±%
Social Democrat	James McCombs	2,075	42.20	
Reform	Malcolm Miller	1,560	31.73	
Liberal	James Laurenson	922	18.75	
Independent Liberal	Henry Thacker	263	5.35	
Independent	William Radcliffe	97	1.97	
Turnout		4,917		

The two highest candidates were McCombs and Miller, so they contested the second ballot.

=== Second ballot ===
1913 Lyttelton by-election: Second ballot
Party	Candidate	Votes	%	±%
Social Democrat	James McCombs	2,628	52.25	
Reform	Malcolm Miller	2,402	47.75	
Majority		226	4.50	
Turnout		5,030		
Social Democrat gain from Liberal		Swing		
