= David Buddo =

New Zealand politician

The Honourable David Buddo
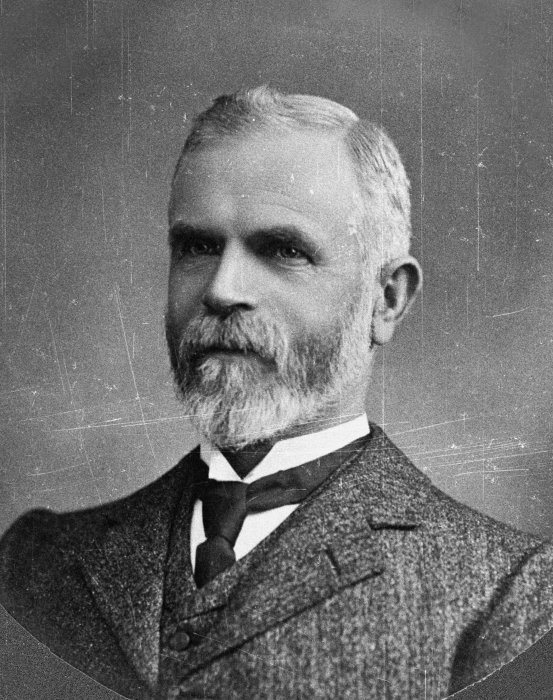

3rd Minister of Health
- In office 6 January 1909 – 28 March 1912
- Prime Minister: Joseph Ward
- Preceded by: George Fowlds
- Succeeded by: George Russell

Member of the New Zealand Parliament for Kaiapoi
- In office 1893–1896
- Succeeded by: Richard Moore
- In office 1899–1919
- Preceded by: Richard Moore
- Succeeded by: David Jones
- In office 1922–1928
- Preceded by: David Jones
- Succeeded by: Richard Hawke

Member of the New Zealand Legislative Council
- In office 1930–1937

Personal details
- Born: 23 August 1853 Edinburgh, Scotland
- Died: 8 December 1937 (aged 84) Christchurch, New Zealand
- Party: Liberal Party
- Spouse: Janet Buddo
- Relations: Bryan Todd (son-in-law)

David Buddo (23 August 1853 – 8 December 1937) was a New Zealand politician and member of the Liberal Party.

== Early life ==
Buddo was born in Edinburgh, Scotland, in 1853. His father was a surgeon with the Indian civil service. He grew up in a rural environment. He became an engineer in Perth, Scotland and came to New Zealand in c. 1874 or 1877. He married Janet Buddo (née Rollo) in 1886. His wife's cousin, Helen Ann Rollo Buddo, became an orphan in infancy and was brought up by them together with their own children. Helen Buddo married Bryan Todd.

== Political career ==
New Zealand Parliament
Years	Term	Electorate	Party
1893–1896	12th	Kaiapoi	Liberal
1899–1902	14th	Kaiapoi	Liberal
1902–1905	15th	Kaiapoi	Liberal
1905–1908	16th	Kaiapoi	Liberal
1911–1914	17th	Kaiapoi	Liberal
1914–1919	18th	Kaiapoi	Liberal
1922–1925	20th	Kaiapoi	Liberal
1925–1928	21st	Kaiapoi	Liberal
1928	Changed allegiance to:		United

He was a Member of the House of Representatives, representing the Kaiapoi electorate (with two interruptions, when he was defeated) from: 1893–96, 1899–1919, and 1922–28.

He was a Cabinet minister, serving in the cabinet of Sir Joseph Ward between 1909 and 1912 as Minister of Internal Affairs and Minister of Health.

After retiring from Parliament in 1928, Buddo was appointed to the Legislative Council, and served one seven-year term from 11 June 1930 to 10 June 1937, when his term ended.

He was a member of the Lyttelton Harbour Board from 1897 to 1907.

In 1935, he was awarded the King George V Silver Jubilee Medal.

== Death ==
Buddo collapsed on 8 December 1937 while in the office of the Christchurch Gas, Coal and Coke Company. He died on his way to hospital. He was buried at Waimairi Cemetery. Janet Buddo survived her husband until 1945. Helen Todd survived her husband, who died in 1987.

== Notes ==
New Zealand Parliament
Preceded by Edward Richardson	Member of Parliament for Kaiapoi; 1893–1896; 1899–1919; 1922–1928	Succeeded by Richard Moore
Preceded by Richard Moore	Member of Parliament for Kaiapoi; 1893–1896; 1899–1919; 1922–1928	Succeeded by David Jones
Preceded by David Jones	Member of Parliament for Kaiapoi; 1893–1896; 1899–1919; 1922–1928	Succeeded by Richard Hawke
Political offices
Preceded by George Fowlds	Minister of Public Health; 1909–1912	Succeeded by George Russell
