= Lyttelton Harbour Board =

New Zealand port authority

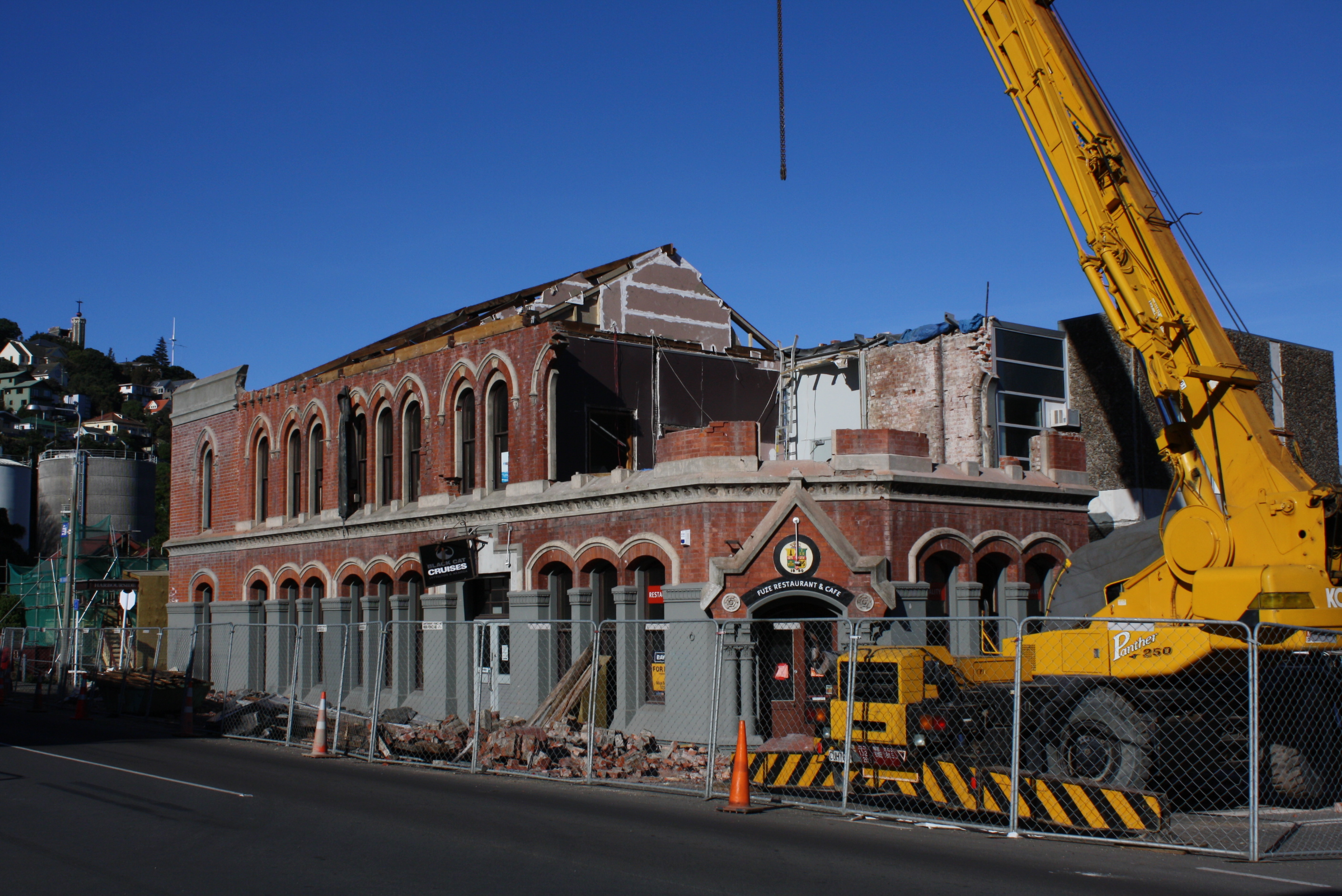
Original Lyttelton Harbour Board offices with earthquake damage; the top story has since been rebuilt to a modern design

The Lyttelton Harbour Board was established on 10 January 1877 to manage Lyttelton Harbour. The harbour had previously been managed by the Canterbury Provincial Council, but provincial government ceased to exist on 1 January 1877. The harbour board was governed by members elected during local elections. Lyttelton Harbour Board was disestablished through the 1989 local government reforms, with its functions transferred to the Lyttelton Port Company.

The Lyttelton Harbour Board held its first meeting on 18 January 1877. The ten inaugural members were Edward Richardson, John Hall, Hugh Murray-Aynsley, Peter Cunningham, Richard James Strachan Harman, David Craig, John Anderson, Edward George Wright, Henry Sawtell, and John T. Rouse. Richardson was unanimously elected as the inaugural chairman. The table below shows the original membership of the harbour board:

Inaugural 1877 Lyttelton Harbour Board membership
Name	Representation
Edward Richardson	Appointed by the Governor and voted as inaugural chair
David Craig	Appointed by the Governor
Peter Cunningham	Elected by members of the Canterbury Chamber of Commerce
John Anderson	Elected by members of the Canterbury Chamber of Commerce
Henry Sawtell	Elected by voters of the City of Christchurch
Edward George Wright	Elected by voters of the City of Christchurch
John Hall	Appointed by Selwyn County Council
Richard James Strachan Harman	Appointed by Selwyn County Council
Hugh Murray-Aynsley	Declared elected unopposed for the Borough of Lyttelton
John T. Rouse	Ex officio member as Mayor of Lyttelton

Cunningham resigned in late 1877 and was replaced by Charles Wesley Turner, the deputy chair of the Canterbury Chamber of Commerce. Harry Allwright was elected mayor of Lyttelton in December 1877 and thus replaced Rouse. Both attended their first meeting in December 1877.

== List of chairman ==
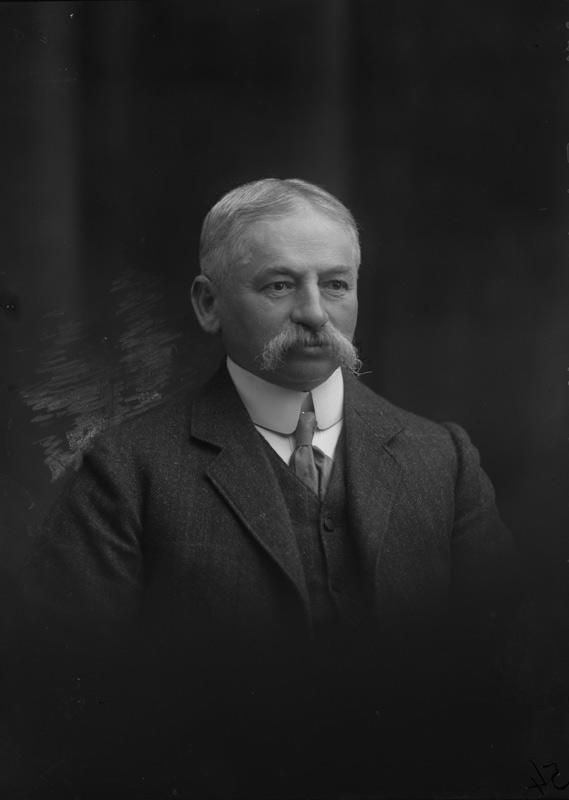
Hugo Friedlander, 17th chairman of the Lyttelton Harbour Board (1909–1913)

The Lyttelton Harbour Board had the following chairmen:

#	Name	Start	End
1	Edward Richardson	18 January 1877	28 February 1882
2	Richard James Strachan Harman	28 February 1882	16 November 1882
3	Peter Cunningham	16 November 1882	27 February 1883
4	Charles Wesley Turner	27 February 1883	26 February 1884
5	John Thomas Peacock	26 February 1884	24 February 1885
6	Edward George Wright	24 February 1885	23 February 1886
(5)	John Thomas Peacock	23 February 1886	1 March 1887
(3)	Peter Cunningham	1 March 1887	26 February 1889
7	Frank Graham	26 February 1889	25 February 1890
8	William White	25 February 1890	24 February 1891
9	Henry William Peryman	24 February 1891	23 February 1892
10	Capt. Thomas McClatchie	23 February 1892	28 February 1893
11	Frederick Waymouth	28 February 1893	26 February 1895
12	John Joyce	26 February 1895	25 February 1896
(6)	Edward George Wright	25 February 1896	1 March 1898
(7)	Frank Graham	1 March 1898	28 February 1899
13	Isaac Gibbs	28 February 1899	27 February 1900
(6)	Edward George Wright	27 February 1900	26 February 1901
(11)	Frederick Waymouth	26 February 1901	25 February 1902
(6)	Edward George Wright †	25 February 1902	12 August 1902
14	Albert Kaye	28 August 1902	23 February 1904
(7)	Frank Graham	23 February 1904	28 February 1905
15	Frederick Harry Barns	28 February 1905	27 February 1906
(11)	Frederick Waymouth	27 February 1906	26 February 1907
16	George Laurenson	26 February 1907	23 February 1909
17	Hugo Friedlander	23 February 1909	7 May 1913
18	Richard Moore	7 May 1913	5 May 1915
19	Malcolm Miller	5 May 1915	9 May 1917
(14)	Albert Kaye	9 May 1917	7 May 1919
20	Henry Bylove Sorensen	7 May 1919	4 May 1921
21	James Storry	4 May 1921	6 June 1923
22	Frederick Horrell	6 June 1923	11 June 1925
23	Wilfred John Walter	11 June 1925	1 June 1927
24	Robert Galbraith	1 June 1927	5 June 1929
25	Henry Holland	5 June 1929	5 June 1930
26	Tim Armstrong	5 June 1930	4 June 1931
27	Captain Hugh Monro	4 June 1931	1 June 1932
28	William Thomas Lester	1 June 1932	7 June 1933
29	William Glassey Gallagher	7 June 1933	6 June 1934
30	Ted Howard	6 June 1934	1 June 1936
31	Walter Kenneth McAlpine †	1 June 1936	11 July 1937
32	Robert McMillan	4 August 1937	7 June 1939
33	Frederick Ernest Sutton	7 June 1939	4 June 1941
34	Humphrey Holderness	4 June 1941	2 June 1943
35	John McAlpine	2 June 1943	6 June 1945
36	Bill MacGibbon	6 June 1945	1947 (?)
37	Charles William Tyler	December 1947 (?)	7 December 1949
38	Frederick W. Freeman	7 December 1949	5 December 1951
39	James Halligan	5 December 1951	2 December 1953
(33)	Frederick Ernest Sutton	2 December 1953	14 December 1955
40	Bill Glue	14 December 1955	18 December 1959
41	Alexander Arthur Macfarlane	18 December 1959	8 December 1965
42	Leslie George Amos	8 December 1965	4 December 1968
43	Frederick Ira Sutton	4 December 1968	8 December 1971
44	Jack Brand	8 December 1971	6 December 1978
45	John Edward Mannering	6 December 1978	2 December 1981
46	Roy Champion	2 December 1981	2 November 1983
47	George Wright	2 November 1983	31 October 1989
† died in office
