= David Jones (New Zealand politician) =

New Zealand politician

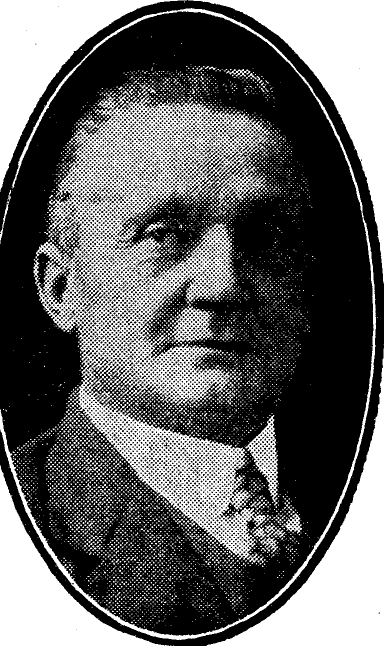
- David Jones in 1925

13th Minister of Agriculture
- In office 22 September 1931 – 8 January 1932
- Prime Minister: George Forbes
- Preceded by: Alfred Murdoch
- Succeeded by: Charles Macmillan

Minister of Mines
- In office 22 September 1931 – 8 January 1932
- Prime Minister: George Forbes
- Preceded by: Alfred Murdoch
- Succeeded by: Charles Macmillan

Member of the New Zealand Parliament for Kaiapoi
- In office 17 December 1919 – 15 November 1922
- Preceded by: David Buddo
- Succeeded by: David Buddo
- Majority: 50 (0.75%)

Member of the New Zealand Parliament for Ellesmere
- In office 4 November 1925 – 18 October 1928
- Preceded by: Heaton Rhodes
- Succeeded by: Constituency abolished
- Majority: 634 (8.57%)

Member of the New Zealand Parliament for Mid-Canterbury
- In office 14 November 1928 – 12 November 1931
- Preceded by: New constituency
- Succeeded by: Jeremiah Connolly
- Majority: 55 (0.59%)

Personal details
- Born: 9 November 1873 Templeton, Canterbury, New Zealand
- Died: 23 September 1941 (aged 67) Wadestown, Wellington, New Zealand
- Party: Reform Party
- Occupation: farmer
- Cabinet: Forbes

David Jones (9 November 1873 – 23 September 1941) was a Reform Party Member of Parliament in the Canterbury region of New Zealand. In September 1931, he was appointed Minister of Agriculture and Minister of Mines in the United–Reform Coalition Government, but he was unexpectedly defeated in the December 1931 general election. He was a farmer and involved with many farming organisations, and was instrumental in forming the New Zealand Farmers Union, which eventually developed into Federated Farmers. Outside parliament, he was best known for his involvement with the New Zealand Meat Producers Board, of which he was the inaugural chairman, and which he chaired for more than a decade.

== Early life ==
Jones was born in Templeton in 1873. His father was James Jones (1835–1922), one of the earliest settlers in Canterbury. Jones attended Templeton School.

On 14 September 1899, he married Elizabeth Jane Maginness, the daughter of John Maginness. They were to have one son and four daughters.

Jones first farmed in Weedons near Rolleston. In 1909–1910, he farmed in the Waikato. Next, he farmed in Dunsandel. Apart from the two years in the Waikato, all his farming was in Canterbury.

== Public roles ==
Jones was one of the instigators of the New Zealand Farmers Union, which eventually developed into Federated Farmers. On three occasions, he was the president of the North Canterbury branch. He belonged to the Wheat Board and, after World War I, the Repatriation Board. He was the chairman of the parliamentary committee that recommended the establishment of the New Zealand Meat Producers Board, and when it was established in 1922, he was appointed as its first chairman. He remained in that role until 1931 and outside his parliamentary activities, this is what he was best known for. He resigned from the position when he was appointed to cabinet. Soon afterwards, he failed to get re-elected in the 1931 election, so he resumed his role as chairman of the Meat Producers Board and held it until 1935. He represented the Meat Producers Board at the 1932 British Empire Economic Conference in Ottawa, Canada. His 1935 resignation came about because he was appointed as member of the Commission of Agriculture.

== Political career ==
New Zealand Parliament
Years	Term	Electorate	Party
1919–1922	20th	Kaiapoi	Reform
1925–1928	22nd	Ellesmere	Reform
1928–1931	23rd	Mid-Canterbury	Reform

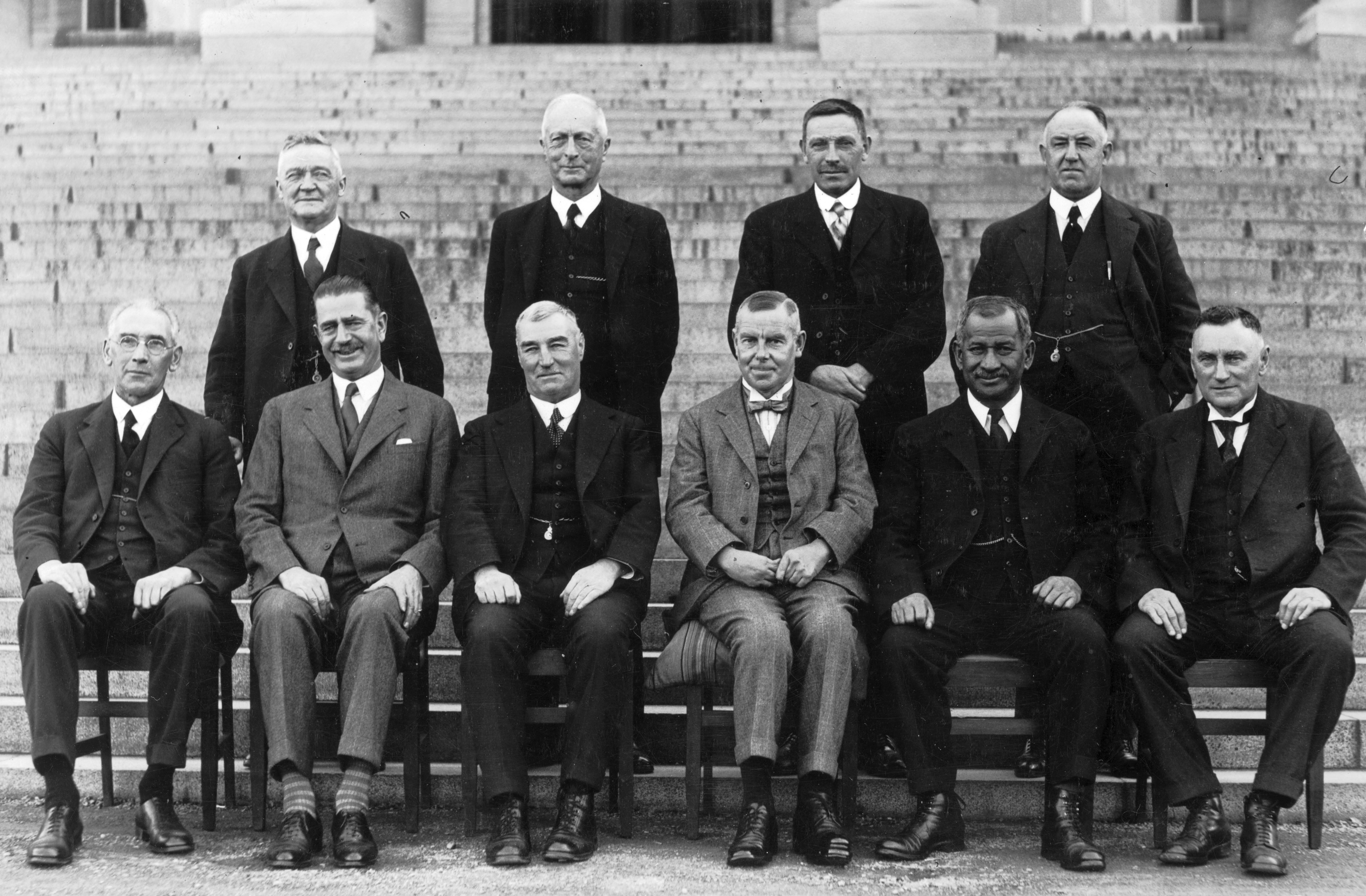
Forbes Coalition Ministry in 1931, including Jones (back left)

He first stood for election to Parliament in the Ashburton electorate in the 1908 election. Of the five candidates, he came third and since the Second Ballot Act was in force, he did not proceed to the second ballot. He was beaten by William Nosworthy and Frederick Flatman, and was only 30 votes behind Nosworthy. On election night when the results were published, Jones was ahead of Nosworthy, who encouraged his supporters to vote for Jones in the second ballot. After a recount, the situation was reversed and Jones advertised for his supporters to vote for Nosworthy, and indeed, Nosworthy was successful in the second ballot.

The next parliamentary election that Jones contested was in 1914 in the Kaiapoi electorate. David Buddo had been the incumbent for the Liberal Party since 1899, plus an earlier term starting in 1893, and Jones failed to unseat him; Buddo had a majority of close to 20% of the votes.

Jones contested the Kaiapoi electorate again in the 1919 election. It was a three-way contest, with Morgan Williams standing for the recently formed Labour Party as the other candidate apart from the incumbent. Jones won by a wafer-thin majority of 50 votes (0.75%).

The same three candidates contested the 1922 election. This time, the situation was reversed, with Buddo having a lean majority over the incumbent, Jones, of 65 votes (0.89%).

In the 1925 election, Jones stood in the Ellesmere electorate. Since 1899, Ellesmere had been held by Heaton Rhodes, who also represented the Reform Party. Rhodes retired in 1925 on medical advice. The other candidate in Ellesmere was Jeremiah Connolly for the Liberal Party (who, in that year, contested the election under the label 'National Party'). Jones had a comfortable majority of 634 votes (8.57%).

In the 1927 Electoral Redistribution, the Ellesmere electorate was abolished and most of its area went to the new Mid-Canterbury electorate. This change first applied at the 1928 election, when four candidates contested the electorate: Jones for Reform, Connolly for United, Williams for Labour, and a farmer from Mount Hutt, Robert Wallace Wightman, as an independent. Nationally, there was a significant swing towards the United Party, who had developed from the Liberal Party, at this election, and Jones once again had a very slim majority, beating Connolly by only 55 votes (0.59%).

In September 1931, just prior to the next election, Jones was appointed to Cabinet by George Forbes as Minister of Agriculture and Minister of Mines. The election was contested by three of the four previous candidates (Williams stood in Kaiapoi instead and was successful), and Hiram Hunter joined as an Independent Labour candidate. Connolly, who stood and an Independent Liberal that year, had a majority of 136 votes (1.46%) over Jones and was returned. There was widespread surprise and regret expressed in New Zealand over Jones having lost the election, and having lost one of the more able cabinet ministers. Jones did not contest the 1935 election. In 1935, he was awarded the King George V Silver Jubilee Medal.

== Family and death ==
The Jones had five children: Violet Irene (born 1900), Ellen Adele (born 1902), Millicent Eileen (born 1904), Hilda Gracey (born 1906), and David Ralston (born 1908). For a time, the Jones family lived in the Christchurch suburb of Bryndwr. Approximately in 1935, Jones and his wife moved to Wellington where they lived at 23 Main Road (Wadestown Road) in the suburb of Wadestown.

His wife died on 17 August 1937 and is buried at Karori Cemetery. Jones retired in January 1940 and died on 23 September 1941 in a private hospital in Wellington. His pall-bearers were all fellow ex-cabinet ministers: Gordon Coates, George Forbes, Adam Hamilton, Bill Endean, Jack Massey, and Bert Kyle. He was survived by his five children and is buried next to his wife.

== Notes ==
New Zealand Parliament
Preceded by David Buddo	Member of Parliament for Kaiapoi; 1919–1922	Succeeded by David Buddo
Preceded by Heaton Rhodes	Member of Parliament for Ellesmere; 1925–1928	Constituency abolished
New constituency	Member of Parliament for Mid-Canterbury; 1928–1931	Succeeded by Jeremiah Connolly
