= Samuel R. Webb =

New Zealand local politician (1848–1933)

6th Mayor of Lyttelton
- In office 20 December 1882 – 17 December 1884
- In office 21 December 1887 – 18 December 1889
- In office 4 May 1904 – 6 May 1908

Personal details
- Born: 17 March 1848 Canterbury, Kent, England
- Died: 17 January 1933 (aged 84) Strowan, Christchurch, New Zealand

Samuel Rollin Webb (17 March 1848 – 17 January 1933) was a New Zealand businessman and local politician. He came to New Zealand with his family as a boy and took over his father's fruiterer and fruit grower business as a young man. Politically ambitious, he was mayor of Lyttelton for eight years spanning three periods. He stood for parliament on four occasions between 1881 and 1905 but was unsuccessful.

== Early life ==
Webb was born in Canterbury, Kent, England in 1848 but grew up at the seaside port of Ramsgate. His father was Samuel Webb, a shoemaker. His mother was Louisa Jane (nee Warman). The Webbs, with their eleven children, came to Lyttelton on the Regina in December 1859. His father initially worked in his learned trade in Lyttelton's main street but soon became a fruiterer and fruit grower. The company operated from Brenchley Farm of the Alport family. Webb junior helped his father and also worked as a baker. When his father died in January 1875, Webb took over the fruiterer and concentrated more on trade by shipping.

== Political career ==
Webb first stood for the Lyttelton Borough Council in the September 1879 elections. He was one of six candidates for three available positions and coming fourth, he missed out. A year later, he topped the local poll and was elected as one of three new councillors. At the 24 November 1880 mayoral election, Webb challenged the incumbent, Harry Allwright, for the Lyttelton mayoralty, but Allwright beat off his challenger by 197 to 108 votes. At the 30 November 1881 mayoral election, the result between Allwright and Webb was much closer, with just nine votes between them. Just over a week later, Webb, Allwright, and Edward Richardson contested the Lyttelton electorate in the 1881 general election and the outcome was equally close. Web came last, just 13 votes behind Allwright and 2 votes behind Richardson.

Allwright retired from the mayoralty at the end of his 1882 term and the 29 November 1882 election was won by Webb, who beat Bryan Weyburne by 195 votes to 131. At the 28 November 1883, Webb was challenged by Hugh Macdonald and was reconfirmed by a one-vote-margin: 158 votes to 157. At the 22 July 1884 general election, Webb once again contested the Lyttelton electorate but was beaten by Allwright, the incumbent. Webb retired from the mayoralty at the end of 1884.

Webb stood for the Lyttelton Borough Council in September 1886 and was successful. Four candidates were nominated for the November 1886 mayoral election but one of them pulled out before election day. Former mayor Allwright was successful with 156 votes, with Hugh McLellan and Webb getting 94 and 72 votes, respectively. The 30 November 1887 mayoral election was contested by Webb and James Boyton Milsom, won by Webb with 181 votes to 130. The same candidates contested the 28 November 1888 mayoral election, with Webb again successful, having received 194 votes to Milsom's 136. Webb retired from the mayoralty in 1889.

Webb contested the 1896 general election and of the three candidates, he came a distant last with 13% of the vote.

External image
- Webb in his later years, published as part of his obituary.

In April 1902, the mayoralty was contested by James Grubb and Webb, with a decisive win for Grubb with 464 votes to 184. Webb and Charles Kay contested the 27 April 1904 mayoral election, with Webb successful at 387 votes to 106. Webb as incumbent was the sole candidate in April 1905 and was declared elected unopposed. At the December 1905 general election, Webb was one of four candidates in the Lyttelton electorate and he came last with 7.6% of the vote. At the 25 April 1906 mayoral election, Webb was challenged by former mayor William Radcliffe but retained his position, with 354 votes to 236. Former mayor Joseph Thomas Brice and councillor Colin Kay challenged Webb for the mayoralty at the 24 April 1907 election, but Webb had a comfortable win. At the 29 April 1908 mayoral election, Colin Cook beat Webb with 427 votes to 373. Webb then joined the borough council as a councillor. He attended his last borough council on 26 April 1913; he had thus been almost continuously on the council as either a councillor or mayor for more than three decades. Important decisions made during Webb's term as mayor included a better drinking water supply (with wells sunk in Heathcote Valley) and an improved sewage system.

== Private life ==
On 8 March 1887, Webb married Sophie Dohrman, the daughter of a farmer from Carleton. As an infant, she had also come out on the Regina. Webb retired during the 1910s and moved to Christchurch. He died on 17 January 1933 at his residence in Normans Road, Strowan, Christchurch. He was survived by his wife, four sons, and two daughters. He was buried at Waimairi Cemetery.

Political offices
Preceded by Harry Allwright	Mayor of Lyttelton; 1882–1884; 1887–1889; 1904–1908	Succeeded by Adam Chalmers
Preceded by Harry Allwright	Mayor of Lyttelton; 1882–1884; 1887–1889; 1904–1908	Succeeded by James B. Milsom
Preceded by William Radcliffe	Mayor of Lyttelton; 1882–1884; 1887–1889; 1904–1908	Succeeded by Colin Cook
