= Hugh Murray-Aynsley =

New Zealand politician (1828–1917)

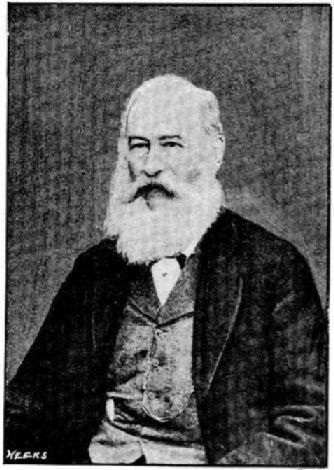
- Hugh Murray-Aynsley

Canterbury Provincial Council
- In office 6 February 1864 – 7 May 1866

Member of the New Zealand Parliament for Lyttelton
- In office 28 December 1875 – 15 August 1879
- Preceded by: Henry Richard Webb
- Succeeded by: Harry Allwright

Personal details
- Born: 8 October 1828 Gloucestershire, England
- Died: 22 February 1917 (aged 88) St Albans, Christchurch, New Zealand
- Resting place: Woolston Cemetery

Hugh Percy Murray-Aynsley (8 October 1828 – 22 February 1917) was a 19th-century Member of Parliament in Canterbury, New Zealand.

== Early life ==
Murray-Aynsley was born in Gloucestershire, England, in 1828. His father was John Murray-Aynsley (1795–1870) from Little Harle Tower, his grandfather was Lord Charles Murray-Aynsley (1771–1808), and his great-grandfather was John Murray, 3rd Duke of Atholl (1729–1774). His mother was Emma Sarah Peach, and his mother's grandfather was Henry Cruger. His grandfather was baptised as Charles Murray and upon his marriage to Alicia Mitford (1768–1813), the heiress of her great-uncle, Gawen Aynsley, Esq, he assumed the additional surname Aynsley. Murray-Aynsley was educated privately; his tutor later became Bishop of Ely.

For a time, Murray-Aynsley managed a sugar plantation in Trinidad for his cousin, Sir William Miles, with the firm operating as Miles & Co. He came to Melbourne on the Royal Bride, and from there to New Zealand in 1858, arriving on the Queen in Lyttelton.

== Life in New Zealand ==
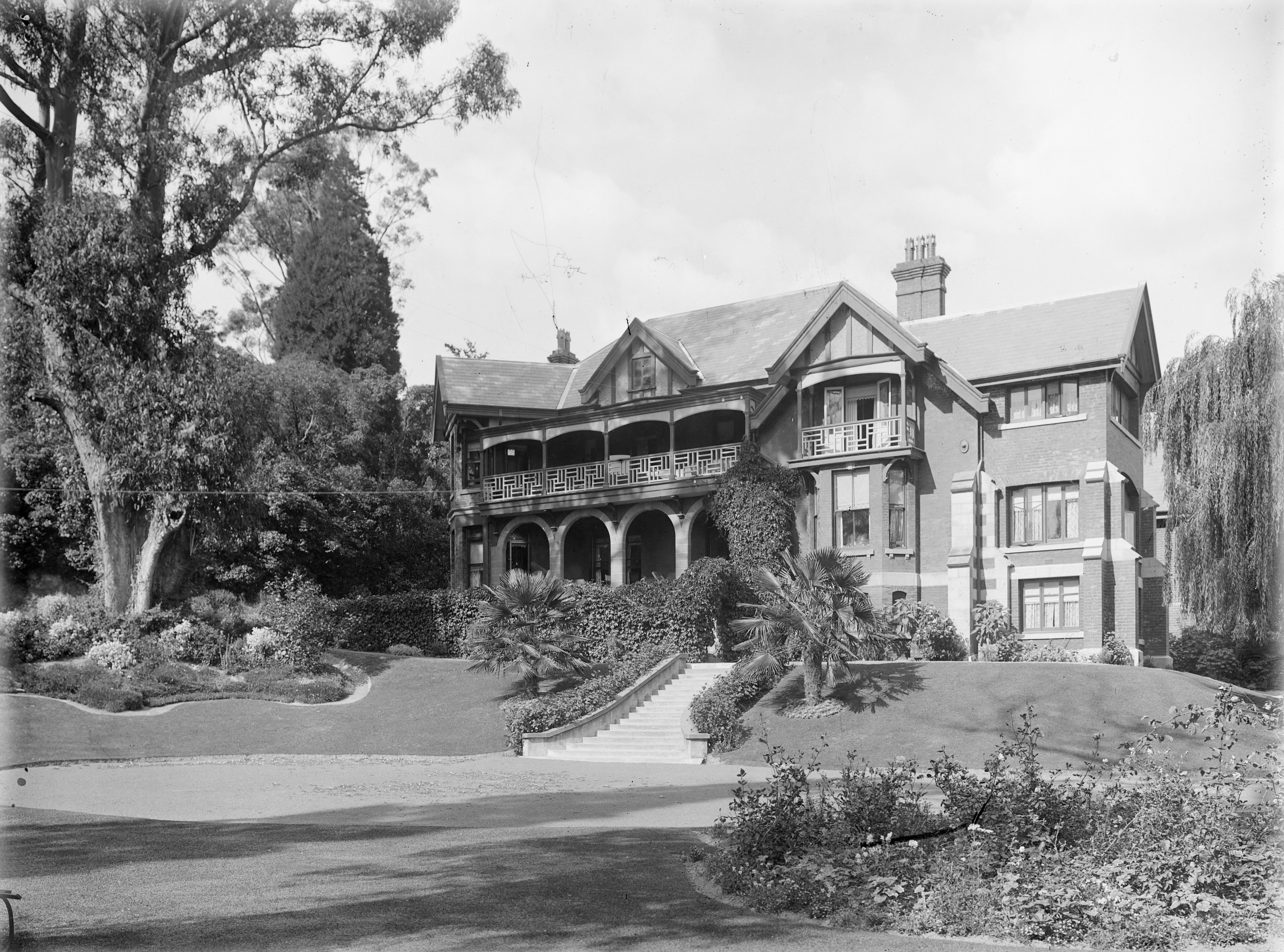
Riverlaw in Christchurch

He was manager and the principal partner for the Christchurch branch of Miles & Co, a stock and station agency. He married Elizabeth Campbell on 7 June 1859. In 1862, Murray-Aynsley purchased Riverlaw, a rural property at the bottom of Rapaki Track adjacent to the Ōpāwaho / Heathcote River originally owned by Alexander Lean. Sometime between 1885 and 1892, Murray-Aynsley had a two-storey homestead built. He sold Riverlaw in 1905 to George John Smith, who further enlarged the house including the addition of a third storey. On 6 September 1984, the house was registered with Heritage New Zealand as a Category II heritage place, with registration number 3728; Riverlaw was regarded as one of the finest colonial homes in Christchurch. It was significantly damaged in the 2011 Christchurch earthquake and demolished soon after.

Murray-Aynsley also bought the Mount Hutt Station in the Canterbury foothills from Alexander Lean.

In 1873, he was one of the founders of the New Zealand Shipping Company. He was one of the directors, and then chairman of directors until his death.

== Political career ==
New Zealand Parliament
Years	Term	Electorate	Party
1875–1879	6th	Lyttelton	Independent

He was a member of the Canterbury Provincial Council for the Town of Lyttelton electorate from 6 February 1864 to 7 May 1866. He was a member of the Canterbury Executive Council from 22 July 1862 to 13 November 1863 under Robert Wilkin, and for a few days until his resignation under Thomas Cass. He was Deputy Superintendent from 31 May 1869 to August 1872 and stood in for William Rolleston in 1869 who was in Wellington attending Parliament.

He represented the Lyttelton electorate in the House of Representatives from 1875 to 1879, when he was defeated by Harry Allwright, the Mayor of Lyttelton.

Note that some sources, for example Wilson (1985) and Scholefield (1950), list him under the surname Aynsley.

== Death and legacy ==
Murray-Aynsley died on 22 February 1917 at his residence at 38 Holly Road, St Albans, Christchurch. He was buried at Woolston Cemetery.

A variety of geographic features commemorate Murray-Aynsley. A spur of the Port Hills above the old homestead is known as Murray Aynsley Hill. Two roads on the true right of the Ōpāwaho / Heathcote River, initially known as River Road, were renamed. While Murray-Aynsley was still alive, the road from Opawa Bridge to Rapaki Track was renamed Aynsley Terrace; the homestead was located at the Rapaki Track end of this road. The next section of road upstream from here was renamed to Riverlaw Terrace in the following year some months after Murray-Aynsley's death. Harold Street in Sydenham was on land that belonged to Murray-Aynsley; it was initially known as Aynsleys Alley No 4, and then Aynsley Street.

== Notes ==
New Zealand Parliament
Preceded by Henry Richard Webb	Member of Parliament for Lyttelton; 1875–1879	Succeeded by Harry Allwright
