= 1884 Kaiapoi by-election =

New Zealand by-election

The 1884 Kaiapoi by-election was a by-election held on 16 May 1884 during the 8th New Zealand Parliament in the Canterbury electorate of Kaiapoi.

The by-election was caused by the resignation of the incumbent MP Isaac Wilson on 7 April 1884.

The by-election was won by Edward Richardson, who was unopposed (although earlier J. Lowthian Wilson had considered to stand).
