= Richard Hawkes =

Richard Hawkes may refer to:

- Richard Hawkes (tennis) (1940–2001), New Zealand judge and tennis player.
- Richard Hawkes (politician), MP for Middlesex (UK Parliament constituency)

== See also ==
- Richard Hawke, NZ politician
