= 1867 Kaiapoi by-election =

New Zealand by-election

The 1867 Kaiapoi by-election was a by-election held on 5 July 1867 during the 4th New Zealand Parliament in the Canterbury electorate of Kaiapoi.

The by-election was caused by the resignation of the incumbent MP Joseph Beswick on 24 April 1867.

The by-election was won by John Studholme. As there were no other candidates, he was declared duly elected.
