= Lyttelton Borough Council Chambers =

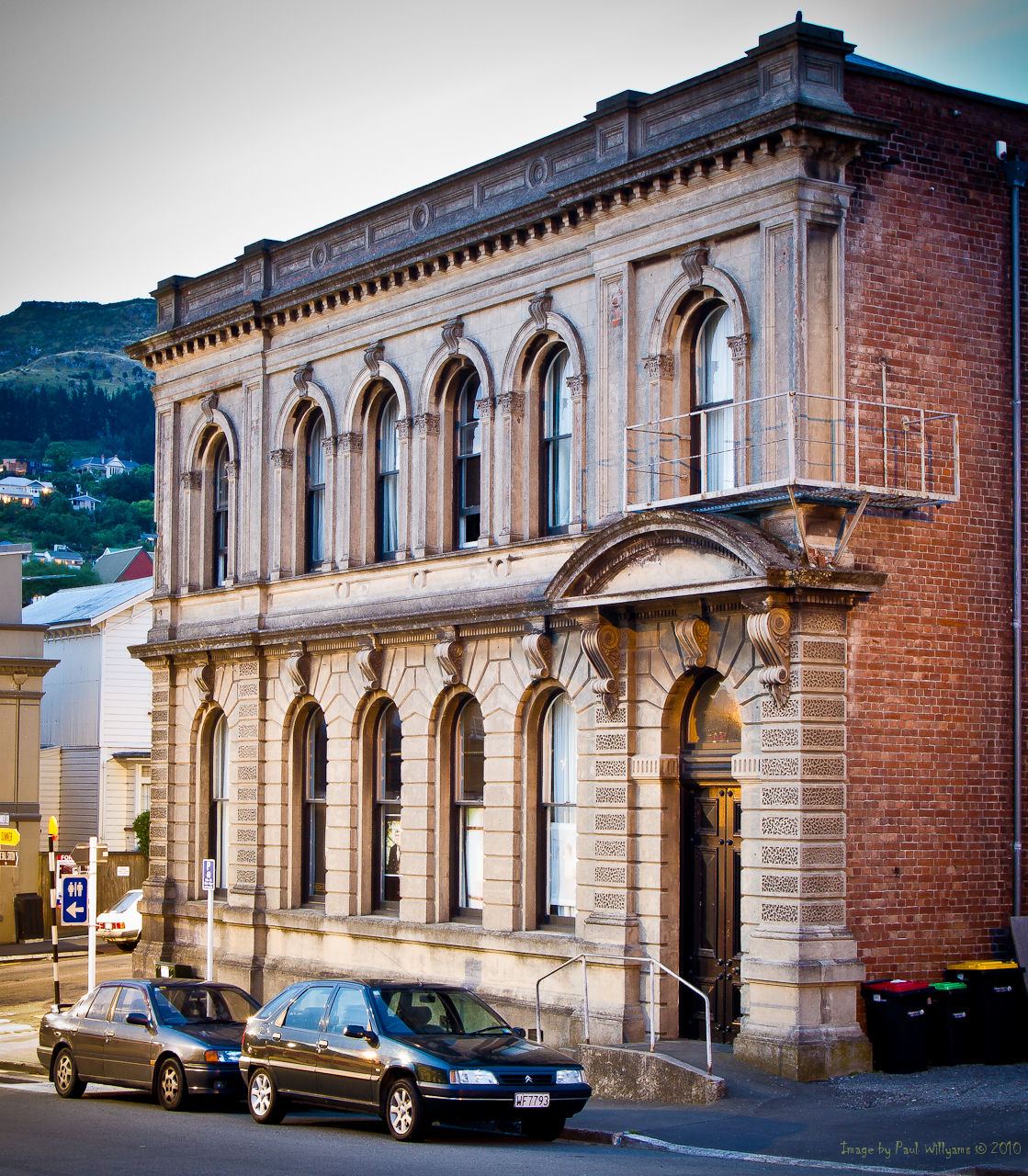
- Lyttelton Borough Council Chambers on 23 December 2010
- Interactive map of the Lyttelton Borough Council Chambers area
- Etymology: Lyttelton Borough Council

General information
- Status: Demolished
- Type: Civic office
- Architectural style: Italianate
- Location: 1 Sumner Road, Lyttelton, New Zealand
- Opened: 18 October 1887; 138 years ago
- Demolished: June 2011; 15 years ago
- Client: Lyttelton Borough Council

Design and construction
- Architecture firm: Collins and Harman
- Main contractor: Hollis, Williams, and Green

Heritage New Zealand – Category 2
- Designated: 12 September 2003
- Reference no.: 7525

The Lyttelton Borough Council Chambers was the head office of the Lyttelton Borough Council from 1887 until the late 20th century, when the borough council moved to a number of other buildings. Civic use of the building stopped in 1999, when the building was sold for business and residential use. Registered by the New Zealand Historic Places Trust in 2003, the building was demolished in June 2011 following the 2011 Christchurch earthquake.

== History ==
The Lyttelton Borough Council was inaugurated in 1868 as a successor to the 1862 Lyttelton municipal council. In February 1886, a committee of borough councillors agreed to have outlined plans drawn up for a purpose-built civic office for the local administration. At the time, any loans that a council wanted to raise were subject to public approval and a public meeting was held in August 1886 to discuss raising a £3,000 loan. The meeting was chaired by the mayor, Adam Chalmers, and the main speaker was Harry Allwright, a borough councillor and the local member of parliament. The issue was put to public vote as part of the borough councillor elections on 9 September 1886, where 442 electors supported the loan, with 26 against and 5 informal votes.

The building was designed by the Christchurch architecture firm Collins and Harman and they first advertised a construction tender two weeks after the election where the loan was approved. Tenders were opened at the borough council meeting on 2 November 1886, with ten tenders received ranging in price from £2,970 to £4,270. The lowest tender, by local Lyttelton contractors Hollis, Williams, and Green, was accepted. The building was a two-storey brick structure. The ground floor was for a resident magistrate's court and associated offices. The upper storey was for use by the borough council. The largest rooms were the court room (11.9 by 7.6 metres or 39 by 25 feet) and the borough council chamber (14.25 by 7.77 metres or 46 feet 9 inches by 25 feet 6 inches). The ceiling height was 4.6 metres (15 ft). The building had frontages onto Sumner Road (then known as London Street; 15.09 metres or 49 feet 6 inches) and Oxford Street (18.44 metres or 60 feet 6 inches). The height from the ground to the parapet was 11 metres (36 ft). Access to the court was via a centrally located door in Oxford Street, and the council offices could be reached via a door at the eastern end of the Sumner Road frontage. The foundation stone was laid on 29 January 1887, and Allwright having just been elected mayor, his name was engraved in that stone:

H. Allwright, Mayor, 1887

There was no formal opening for the building, but the first council meeting was held in the new building on 18 October 1887. As the ground floor was used as a court, the fitout of that floor was done by prison labour and completion of that floor took longer.

Over time, the use of the court declined and in the end, the council chamber was used for court sittings, with borough council staff taking over the ground floor. With staff numbers continuing to increase, the borough council bought the Albion Hotel and shifted staff there in 1978. At that time, the Lyttelton Library moved from across the road into the former court premises. In 1991, council staff moved again, this time into the building of the Lyttelton Port Company. In 1999, the library was moved to its present building. Council placed a covenant on the building in 1999 and sold it to private interests for commercial use downstairs and residential use upstairs.

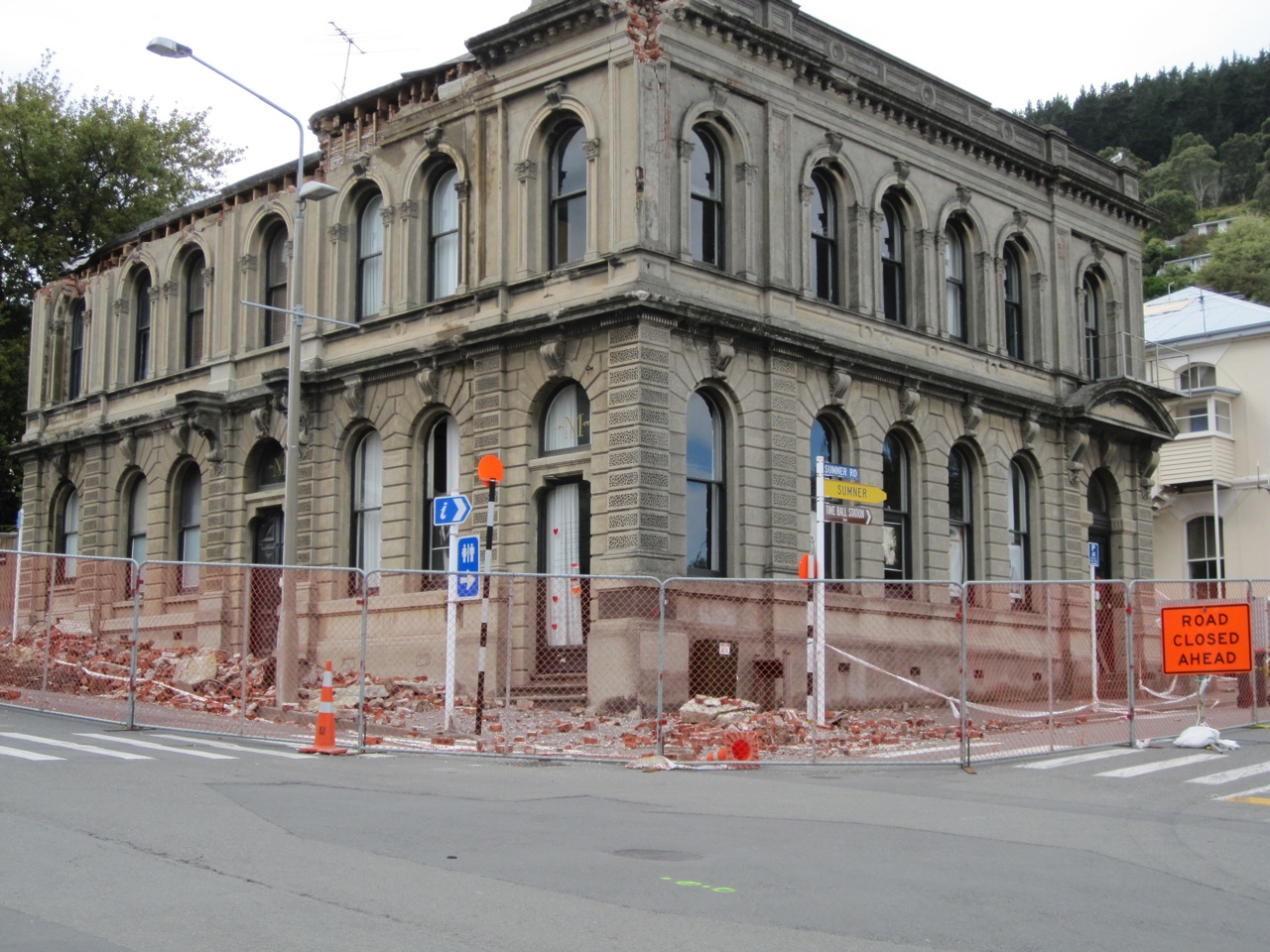
Lyttelton Borough Council Chambers with damage from the February 2011 Christchurch earthquake

The building was demolished in June 2011 due to the earthquake in February that year.

== Heritage designation ==
The building was registered as a Category II heritage building by the New Zealand Historic Places Trust on 12 September 2003.
