= Alexander Lean =

Runholder, architect, military volunteer, musician (1824–1893)

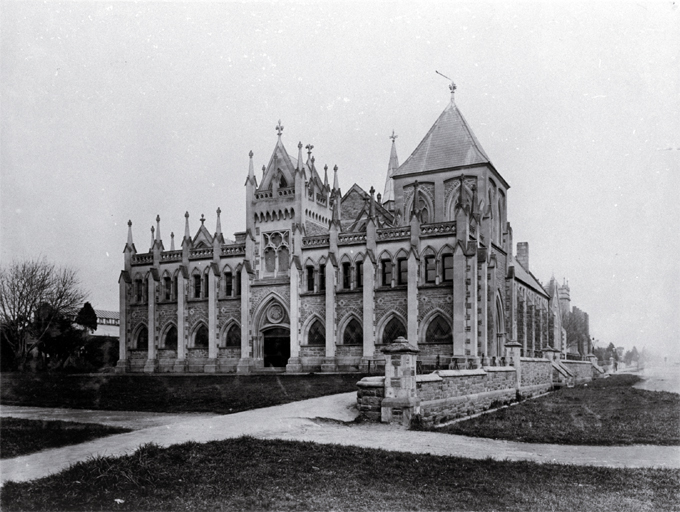
Christchurch Supreme Court

Alexander Lean (21 May 1824 – 20 November 1893) was a New Zealand runholder, architect, military volunteer and musician. He was born in London, England on 21 May 1824. His most valuable contribution as an architect were the Christchurch Supreme Court buildings, which were progressively demolished between 1974 and 1985.

In 1853, Lean was the original purchaser of land at the bottom of Rāpaki Track next to the Ōpāwaho / Heathcote River, which he called Riverlaw. He sold this land in 1859 to Michael le Fleming and with an additional intermittent owner, the property was purchased by Hugh Murray-Aynsley in 1862.

Lean acted as the returning officer for the Christchurch electorate in the 1893 election when he suddenly died on 20 November 1893 in Christchurch. He is buried at St Peter's in Upper Riccarton.
