= William Whitby (mariner) =

New Zealand master mariner and ship owner

William Laird Whitby (30 January 1838 – 12 October 1922) was a notable New Zealand master mariner and ship owner. He was born in Helhoughton, Norfolk, England in 1838. He unsuccessfully contested the Lyttelton mayoralty at the April 1903 election.
