= Kaiapoi (electorate) =

Kaiapoi was a rural New Zealand electorate, north of Christchurch in the Canterbury region of New Zealand from 1861 to 1946. It was represented by twelve Members of Parliament.

== Population centres ==
The electorate was centred on the town of Kaiapoi to the north of Christchurch. In the 1887 election, polling booths were in Kaiapoi, Clarkville, Rangiora and Woodend.

== History ==
The electorate dates from 1861. Isaac Cookson was the first representative after winning the 1861. Cookson had previously represented the Christchurch Country electorate, which was abolished at the end of the term of the 2nd Parliament in 1960. Cookson resigned in 1863, and the resulting 1863 by-election was won by Robert Wilkin. Wilkin retired at the end of the parliamentary term and was succeeded by Joseph Beswick, who won the 1866 election, but resigned the following year.

The resulting 1867 by-election was won by John Studholme, who was confirmed at the 1871 election but resigned in 1874. He was succeeded by Charles Bowen in the 1875 by-election. Bowen was confirmed in the 1875 and 1879 elections. Bowen retired at the 1881 election.

Isaac Wilson was elected in 1881, but resigned before the end of the term due to failing health. Edward Richardson stood in the 16 May 1884 by-election. He was returned unopposed. Richardson won the 1884 and 1887 elections, and he retired at the end of the parliamentary term in 1890. In the 1887 election, his opponent was Richard Moore.

Moore was the successful candidate in the 1890 election. A conservative, he was defeated by David Buddo of the Liberal Party in the 1893 election. Moore in turn defeated Buddo in the 1896 election. In the 1899 election, Buddo defeated Moore again. This time, Buddo held the electorate until he was defeated in the 1919 election by David Jones. At the next election in 1922, Buddo defeated Jones. From 1925, his Liberal Party called itself 'National Party' for two years. Buddo retired in 1928.

Buddo was succeeded by Richard Hawke from the United Party in the 1928 election. He was re-elected in 1931, but lost the 1935 election against Labour's Morgan Williams. Williams held the electorate until it was abolished in 1946. Williams contested the St Albans in the 1946 election, but was defeated.

=== Members of Parliament ===
Key

Independent Conservative Liberal Reform United Labour

Election	Winner
1861 election	Isaac Cookson
1863 by-election	Robert Wilkin
1866 election	Joseph Beswick
1867 by-election	John Studholme
1871 election	John Studholme
1875 by-election	Charles Bowen
1875 election	Charles Bowen
1879 election	Charles Bowen
1881 election	Isaac Wilson
1884 by-election	Edward Richardson
1884 election	Edward Richardson
1887 election	Edward Richardson
1890 election	Richard Moore
1893 election	David Buddo
1896 election	Richard Moore
1899 election	David Buddo
1902 election	David Buddo
1905 election	David Buddo
1908 election	David Buddo
1911 election	David Buddo
1914 election	David Buddo
1919 election	David Jones
1922 election	David Buddo
1925 election	David Buddo
1928 election	Richard Hawke
1931 election	Richard Hawke
1935 election	Morgan Williams
1938 election	Morgan Williams
1943 election	Morgan Williams
(Electorate abolished 1946)

== Election results ==
=== 1943 election ===
1943 general election: Kaiapoi
Party	Candidate	Votes	%	±%
Labour	Morgan Williams	5,767	50.08	−5.68
National	William Harold Overton	5,006	43.47	
Real Democracy	Oscar Alfred Thelning	432	3.75	
People's Movement	Harry Bliss	143	1.24	
Informal votes		166	1.44	−0.04
Majority		761	6.60	−6.94
Turnout		11,514	89.34	−2.07
Registered electors		12,887		

=== 1938 election ===
1938 general election: Kaiapoi
Party	Candidate	Votes	%	±%
Labour	Morgan Williams	6,318	55.76	+8.71
National	George Warren	4,813	42.48	
Informal votes		168	1.48	
Majority		1,535	13.54	−0.53
Turnout		11,329	91.41	
Registered electors		12,393		

=== 1935 election ===
1935 general election: Kaiapoi
Party	Candidate	Votes	%	±%
Labour	Morgan Williams	4,763	47.05	
United	Richard Hawke	3,339	32.98	−24.69
Independent	Archibald Albany McLachlan (Note: For some biographical details of McLachlan refer to his grandfather's article)	2,021	19.96	
Majority		1,424	14.07	−1.29
Turnout		10,123	88.17	+2.30
Registered electors		11,481		

Table footnotes:

=== 1931 election ===
1931 general election: Kaiapoi
Party	Candidate	Votes	%	±%
United	Richard Hawke	5,312	57.68	+23.16
Labour	John Archer	3,898	42.32	
Majority		1,414	15.35	+14.32
Informal votes		26	0.28	−1.47
Turnout		9,236	85.87	−3.80
Registered electors		10,756		

=== 1928 election ===
1928 general election: Kaiapoi
Party	Candidate	Votes	%	±%
United	Richard Hawke	3,216	34.52	
Reform	James Arthur Flesher	3,120	33.49	
Labour	Elizabeth McCombs	2,980	31.99	
Majority		96	1.03	−6.08
Informal votes		166	1.75	+0.94
Turnout		9,482	89.67	−1.98
Registered electors		10,574		

=== 1925 election ===
1925 general election: Kaiapoi
Party	Candidate	Votes	%	±%
Liberal	David Buddo	3,594	45.98	+0.56
Reform	William Brock	3,038	38.86	
Labour	Morgan Williams	1,185	15.16	+5.11
Majority		556	7.11	+6.23
Informal votes		64	0.81	0.19
Turnout		7,881	91.65	+2.40
Registered electors		8,599		

=== 1922 election ===
1922 general election: Kaiapoi
Party	Candidate	Votes	%	±%
Liberal	David Buddo	3,328	45.42	+7.27
Reform	David Jones	3,263	44.53	+5.63
Labour	Morgan Williams	736	10.05	−12.89
Majority		65	0.89	+0.13
Informal votes		46	0.62	−0.44
Turnout		7,373	89.25	+5.45
Registered electors		8,261		

=== 1919 election ===
1919 general election: Kaiapoi
Party	Candidate	Votes	%	±%
Reform	David Jones	2,580	38.91	−1.30
Liberal	David Buddo	2,530	38.15	−21.64
Labour	Morgan Williams	1,521	22.94	
Majority		50	0.75	−18.83
Informal votes		71	1.06	+0.53
Turnout		6,702	83.80	−4.24
Registered electors		7,998		

=== 1914 election ===
1914 general election: Kaiapoi
Party	Candidate	Votes	%	±%
Liberal	David Buddo	3,606	59.79	
Reform	David Jones	2,425	40.21	
Majority		1,181	19.58	
Informal votes		32	0.53	
Turnout		6,063	88.04	
Registered electors		6,887		

=== 1899 election ===
1899 general election: Kaiapoi
Party	Candidate	Votes	%	±%
Liberal	David Buddo	2,186	54.45	
Conservative	Richard Moore	1,705	42.47	
Independent	John Verrall	124	3.09	
Majority		481	11.98	
Turnout		4,015	83.72	
Registered electors		4,796		

=== 1893 election ===
1893 general election: Kaiapoi
Party	Candidate	Votes	%	±%
Liberal	David Buddo	1,587	51.41	
Conservative	Richard Moore	1,500	48.59	−14.42
Majority		87	2.82	
Turnout		3,087	82.96	+14.19
Registered electors		3,721		

=== 1890 election ===
1890 general election: Kaiapoi
Party	Candidate	Votes	%	±%
Conservative	Richard Moore	937	63.01	
Liberal–Labour	William Hoban	550	36.99	
Majority		387	26.02	
Turnout		1,487	68.77	
Registered electors		2,162		

=== 1875 by-election ===
1875 Kaiapoi by-election
Party	Candidate	Votes	%	±%
Independent	Charles Bowen	294	60.49	
Independent	Joseph Beswick	192	39.51	
Turnout		486		
Majority		102	20.99	

=== 1866 election ===
1866 general election: Kaiapoi
Party	Candidate	Votes	%	±%
Independent	Joseph Beswick	101	52.06	
Independent	William Travers	93	47.94	
Majority		8	4.12	
Turnout		194		
Registered electors				
