= George Laurenson =

New Zealand politician

The Honourable George Laurenson
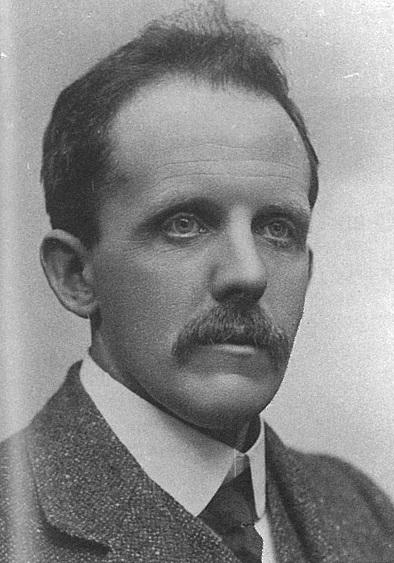

Member of the New Zealand Parliament for Lyttelton
- In office 6 December 1899 – 19 November 1913
- Preceded by: John Joyce
- Succeeded by: James McCombs

Personal details
- Born: 5 July 1857 Edinburgh, Midlothian, Scotland
- Died: 19 November 1913 (aged 56) Lyttelton, New Zealand
- Party: Liberal (1899–1913)
- Other political affiliations: New Liberal (1905); Labour Party

George Laurenson (5 July 1857 – 19 November 1913) was a New Zealand Member of Parliament for Lyttelton in the South Island.

== Early life ==
The Lyttelton Times parliamentary correspondent described Laurenson as: "a Scotchman by birth, a Shetlander by education, a New Zealander by adoption, a storekeeper by trade, and a yachtsman by preference."

George Laurenson was a partner in Forbes and Co, Ships Chandlers, of Lyttelton. He was born in Edinburgh, Scotland, and was educated in the Shetland Islands. Laurenson served on numerous local boards and committees: he was chairman of the Lyttelton Harbour Board and the Canterbury Chamber of Commerce. Laurenson was a member of the Navy League Canterbury.

== Member of Parliament ==
New Zealand Parliament
Years	Term	Electorate	Party
1899–1902	14th	Lyttelton	Liberal
1902–1905	15th	Lyttelton	Liberal
1905–1908	16th	Lyttelton	New Liberal
1908–1911	17th	Lyttelton	Liberal
1911–1913	18th	Lyttelton	Liberal

Laurenson represented the Lyttelton electorate in the New Zealand House of Representatives for fourteen years from 1899 to his death in 1913. From 1909 until 1910 he was senior whip of the Liberal Party.

=== New Liberal Party ===
Laurenson was the nominal leader or chairman of the New Liberal Party in 1905 though Tommy Taylor was the dominant figure. Like Taylor, Laurenson favoured federation with Australia. Laurenson was one of the few who stood as a New Liberal in the 1905 election and retained his seat. Most, including Taylor were defeated.

=== Cabinet Minister ===
On 22 March 1912 he stood in a leadership election against Thomas Mackenzie to decide the successor to Sir Joseph Ward as leader of the Liberal Party, but lost (9 votes to 22). He was subsequently the Deputy Prime Minister and Minister of Labour, Customs and Marine in Mackenzie's cabinet. In July the Liberal government was defeated, after the defection of some Liberal members like John A. Millar to Reform.

== Local politics ==
In April 1913, Laurenson stood for mayor of Lyttelton, contesting the election with John Richard Webb, a Lyttelton borough councillor. Webb won; he received 608 votes to Laurenson's 490.

== Later life ==
Laurenson was a Labour movement sympathizer, but never formally joined the Labour Party though he agreed with the Labour Party's stand during the 1913 general strike, and was often known to have appeared at meetings with the leaders of the Federation of Labour (the 'Red Feds'). Laurenson died on 19 November 1913 aged just 56. Laurenson's seat was won by a Labour candidate, James McCombs.

A son of George Laurenson, George Lyttelton Laurenson CBE (1893–1968), was Commissioner of Transport.

== Notes ==
New Zealand Parliament
Preceded by John Joyce	Member of Parliament for Lyttelton; 1899–1913	Succeeded by James McCombs
Party political offices
Preceded by Alfred Kidd	Senior Whip of the Liberal Party; 1909–1910	Succeeded by William MacDonald
Political offices
Preceded by Frederick Waymouth	Chairman of the Lyttelton Harbour Board; 1907–1909	Succeeded by Hugo Friedlander
