= 1912 New Zealand Liberal Party leadership election =

- 22 March 1912
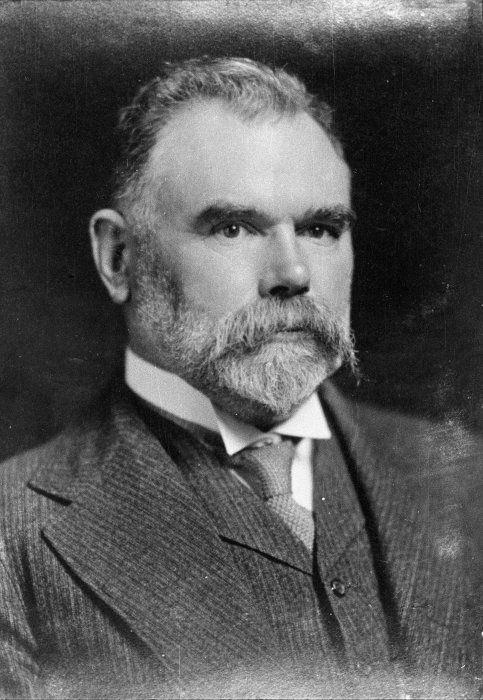

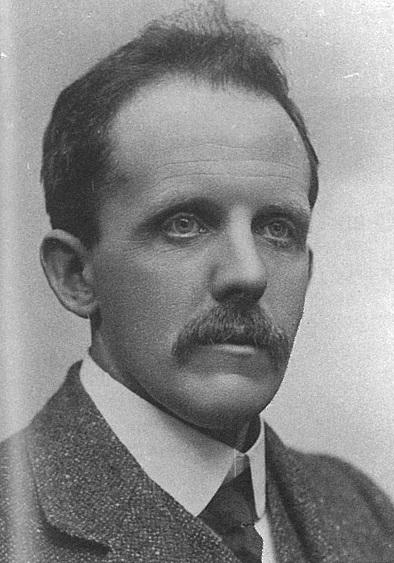
Candidate	Thomas Mackenzie	George Laurenson
Leader's seat	Egmont	Lyttelton
Popular vote	22	9
Percentage	70.9%	29.1%
Leader before election
Joseph Ward
Leader after election
Thomas Mackenzie

The New Zealand Liberal Party leadership election 1912 was held on 22 March to choose the next leader of the New Zealand Liberal Party. The election was won by Thomas Mackenzie, who succeeded Joseph Ward.

== Background ==
In February 1912 the Liberal Government led by Joseph Ward was saved from defeat in a confidence only by the casting vote of the speaker. Ward made good on an earlier promise and resigned the premiership.

== Candidates ==
=== Thomas Mackenzie ===
Mackenzie was seen by many as a strong contender for the leadership by many observers of the jockeying for position following Ward's resignation. However, many also saw Mackenzie as too new a recruit to the party to lead it.

=== George Laurenson ===
Laurenson had been an MP since 1899 and represented the urban and more left-leaning Liberals. He was the member from Lyttelton. His candidacy took many by surprise, as talk of him as leader had been dismissed as mere gossip by the press.

=== Others ===
Many expected John Millar to seek the leadship, thinking him assured the votes of members from urban electorates. However, realising that he did not have backing from the labour sympathisers in caucus (who supported Laurenson) he declined to run. Many others thought he lacked the charisma needed to reverse the party's fortunes. The only other name mentioned in the press as a possible successor to Ward was that of Josiah Hanan, MP for Invercargill.

== Result ==
After a 10-hour caucus meeting on 22 March, presided over by Ward, Mackenzie won a simple ballot by the caucus 22 votes to 9.

Name	Votes	Percentage
Thomas Mackenzie	22	70.9%
George Laurenson	9	29.1%

== Aftermath ==
After the vote, Laurenson became deputy and the two quickly put together a new cabinet. Mackenzie was to serve as Prime Minister from 28 March to 10 July 1912 when he resigned, after his party was defeated when it met the reassembled Parliament, giving way to the first Government of William Massey ending the Liberal's 22 year government.
