= 1863 Kaiapoi by-election =

New Zealand by-election

The 1863 Kaiapoi by-election was a by-election held on 2 September 1863 in the Kaiapoi electorate during the 3rd New Zealand Parliament.

The by-election was caused by the resignation of incumbent MP Isaac Cookson and was won unopposed by Robert Wilkin.
