= 1875 Kaiapoi by-election =

New Zealand by-election

The 1875 Kaiapoi by-election was a by-election held on 30 October 1875 during the 5th New Zealand Parliament in the Canterbury electorate of Kaiapoi.

The by-election was caused by the resignation of the incumbent MP John Studholme on 8 December 1874.

The by-election was won by Charles Bowen.

== Results ==
The following table gives the election result:

1875 Kaiapoi by-election
Party	Candidate	Votes	%	±%
Independent	Charles Bowen	294	60.49	
Independent	Joseph Beswick	192	39.51	
Turnout		486		
Majority		102	20.99	
