= Joseph Beswick =

New Zealand politician (1831–1888)

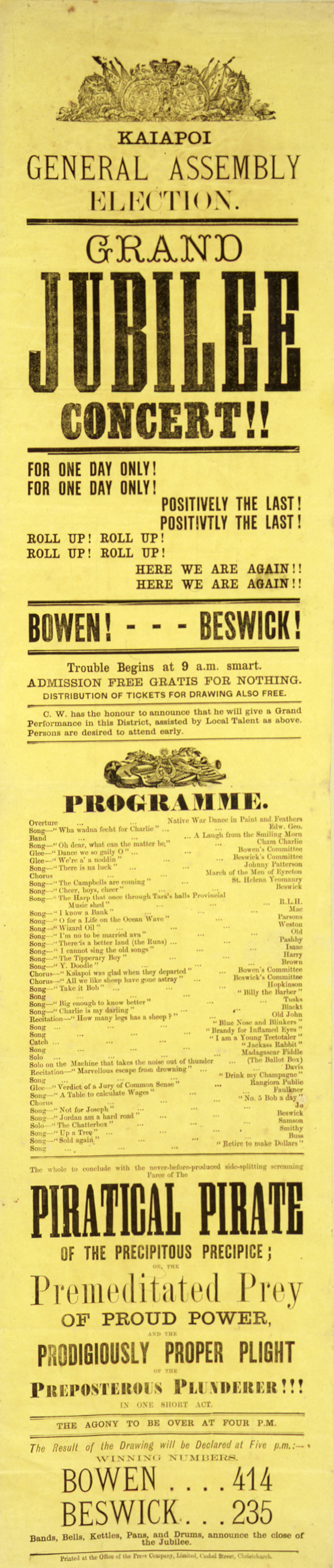
Satirical political poster printed for the Kaiapoi 1875 general election

Joseph Sutton Beswick (1831 – 3 June 1888) was a 19th-century politician and a magistrate in Canterbury, New Zealand. Of entrepreneurial spirit, he was involved with various rural sheep stations and involved in business dealings with John Hall. He and three of his brothers had emigrated to New Zealand from Yorkshire in 1853. Beswick was involved in politics at the local, provincial, and national level. He represented the Kaiapoi electorate for one year in the House of Representatives.

== Private life ==
Beswick was born in 1831 in Kingston upon Hull in Yorkshire. He was an early settler in Canterbury. Three of his brothers also lived in Canterbury. John and Samuel Beswick arrived in May 1853 on the Hampshire (although John returned to England in 1856), and Captain William Cockerill Beswick and Joseph Beswick came to Canterbury on the John Taylor, which arrived in Lyttelton on 18 October 1853. Joseph Beswick was described as "perhaps the most enterprising of the four brothers". Their father was Samuel Beswick of Scarborough.

Beswick initially set himself up as a timber and grain merchant in Kaiapoi. He called his house 'Gristhorpe' after the family's house in Yorkshire. He took up part of the Springfield Run early during his time in Canterbury but was reported to have abandoned it again, just as it had been done by brothers George Williamson and John Hall before him. Then again, William Bray is described as the next licensee of this run and he received his license in August 1853; this was before Beswick had even reached New Zealand. Beswick leased the Mount Hutt run from John Hall in March 1856 but Hall cancelled the lease soon after as Beswick was unable to find stock for the station. In 1858, he took over the Glenmore Run in South Canterbury's Mackenzie Country. He held this station until he sold it in 1866 to John Hall.

Beswick was first mentioned in the Lyttelton Times in June 1854 when sheep owners voted to fill the position of scab inspector.

Beswick returned home to Kingston upon Hull to marry Matilda Emily Horncastle at Christ Church on 18 July 1857. His wife was the daughter of Thomas Horncastle; they were also from Kingston upon Hull.

Beswick later traded as a merchant in Ashburton and then lived in Timaru. He was resident magistrate in Lyttelton and then in Timaru.

== Political career ==
New Zealand Parliament
Years	Term	Electorate	Party
1866–1867	4th	Kaiapoi	Independent

Beswick represented the Mandeville electorate in the Canterbury Provincial Council for many years. He was first elected in April 1862 to the fourth council and held representation until April 1867. He was next a representative from June 1870 to February 1874. He was a member of the Canterbury Executive Council from 14 December 1866 to 20 April 1867, and again from 30 September 1871 to 2 January 1874. In January 1864, the Mandeville and Rangiora Road Board was established by the Canterbury Provincial Council. Beswick was elected onto the initial board.

He represented the Kaiapoi electorate in the House of Representatives from 1866 to 24 April 1867, when he resigned. He stood unsuccessfully in the 1875 by-election for Kaiapoi; he was beaten by Charles Bowen.

== Later life and death ==
He had been a magistrate in Lyttelton and Timaru. He died in Timaru after a long illness. His wife had died in January 1886.

His son Harry Beswick was mayor of Christchurch in 1896. Beswick Street in Kaiapoi was named after the four brothers; the street was located in the area red zoned after the 2011 Christchurch earthquake and no longer exists as that zone is now parkland. Beswick Street in Timaru also commemorates the Beswicks.

New Zealand Parliament
Preceded by Robert Wilkin	Member of Parliament for Kaiapoi; 1866–1867	Succeeded by John Studholme
