= Richard Moore (New Zealand politician) =

New Zealand politician (1849–1936)

Richard Moore (7 March 1849 – 12 September 1936) was an independent conservative Member of Parliament in New Zealand and Mayor of Kaiapoi.

== Biography ==
New Zealand Parliament
Years	Term	Electorate	Party
1890–1893	11th	Kaiapoi	Independent
1896–1899	13th	Kaiapoi	Independent

Moore was born in London on 7 March 1849, the son of shoemaker John Moore and his wife Ann. He left England with his family on the Steadfast in February 1851, which arrived in Lyttelton on 8 June of that year. The family settled in Kaiapoi. At 21, he set himself up as a coachbuilder and wheelwright. Later on, he added saddlery to his business. When he sold the business he bought a shareholding in the Kaiapoi Produce Company and later became its sole owner. He was a large shareholder in the Kaiapoi Woollen Company.

Moore chaired the school committee for 14 years. He was a member of the Kaiapoi Borough Council for eight years and was Mayor of Kaiapoi from 1884 to 1887. He was chairman of the Waimakariri Harbour Board.

In the 1887 election, he unsuccessfully contested the Kaiapoi electorate against Edward Richardson. He represented Kaiapoi from 1890 to 1893, when he was defeated, and from 1896 to 1899, when he was again defeated.

Moore was conjointly elected onto the Lyttelton Harbour Board by the boroughs of Kaiapoi and Rangiora in February 1905. He was chairman of the harbour board from 7 May 1913 until 5 May 1915.

He was appointed to the Legislative Council on 14 July 1914. He was twice re-appointed and served until 13 July 1935. In 1935, he was awarded the King George V Silver Jubilee Medal.

Moore died in 1936 at his home in the Christchurch suburb of Cashmere, and was buried at Kaiapoi Cemetery.

== Notes ==
New Zealand Parliament
Preceded by Edward Richardson	Member of Parliament for Kaiapoi; 1890–1893; 1896–1899	Succeeded by David Buddo
Preceded by David Buddo	Member of Parliament for Kaiapoi; 1890–1893; 1896–1899	Succeeded by David Buddo
Political offices
Preceded by Hugo Friedlander	Chairman of the Lyttelton Harbour Board; 1913–1915	Succeeded by Malcolm Miller
