= Lyttelton Borough =

Former borough of New Zealand

Coordinates: 43°36′10″S 172°43′23″E

- Borough of New Zealand
- 1868–1989
- Capital: Lyttelton
- History
  - Established: 1868
  - Disestablished: 1989
- Today part of: Christchurch City Council

Lyttelton Borough was the local authority for the town of Lyttelton in Canterbury, New Zealand between 1868 and 1989, when it became part of Banks Peninsula District.

== History ==
Lyttelton became a borough on 28 May 1868 under the Municipal Corporations Act, 1867. The functions of Lyttelton Municipal Council (1862–1868), were transferred to the Borough.

In 1911, the Lyttelton Borough Extension Bill, added Diamond Harbour to the borough and a ferry was started. Port Hills Energy Authority was formed as a joint undertaking for Lyttelton and Heathcote in 1989.

The 1989 New Zealand local government reforms merged Lyttelton, Mount Herbert, Wairewa and Akaroa councils into Banks Peninsula District. In 2006 the Banks Peninsula District merged into Christchurch City.

== See also ==
- Mayor of Lyttelton
- Lyttelton Borough Council Chambers
- List of former territorial authorities in New Zealand § Counties
