= Richard Hawke =

New Zealand politician

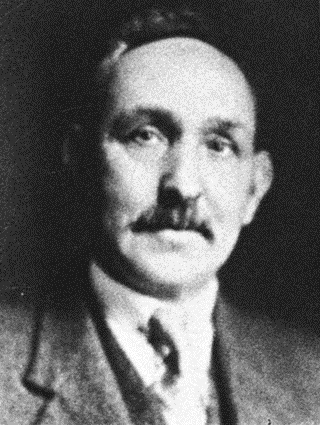
Hawke in 1928.

Richard Wilson Hawke (1865 – 12 July 1941) was a United Party Member of Parliament in New Zealand, and a farmer and poultry-breeder.

== Biography ==
New Zealand Parliament
| Years | Term | Electorate | Party |
|---|---|---|---|
| 1928–1931 | 23rd | Kaiapoi | United |
| 1931–1935 | 24th | Kaiapoi | United |

He won the Kaiapoi electorate in 1928, but was defeated in 1935.

In 1935, he was awarded the King George V Silver Jubilee Medal.

He died in Papanui, Christchurch aged 75. He was born in Cornwall, England, and had been on the Waimairi County Council.

New Zealand Parliament
| Preceded by David Buddo | Member of Parliament for Kaiapoi; 1928–1935 | Succeeded by Morgan Williams |
