= Edward Richardson =

New Zealand engineer, and Member of Parliament

The Honourable Edward Richardson CMG
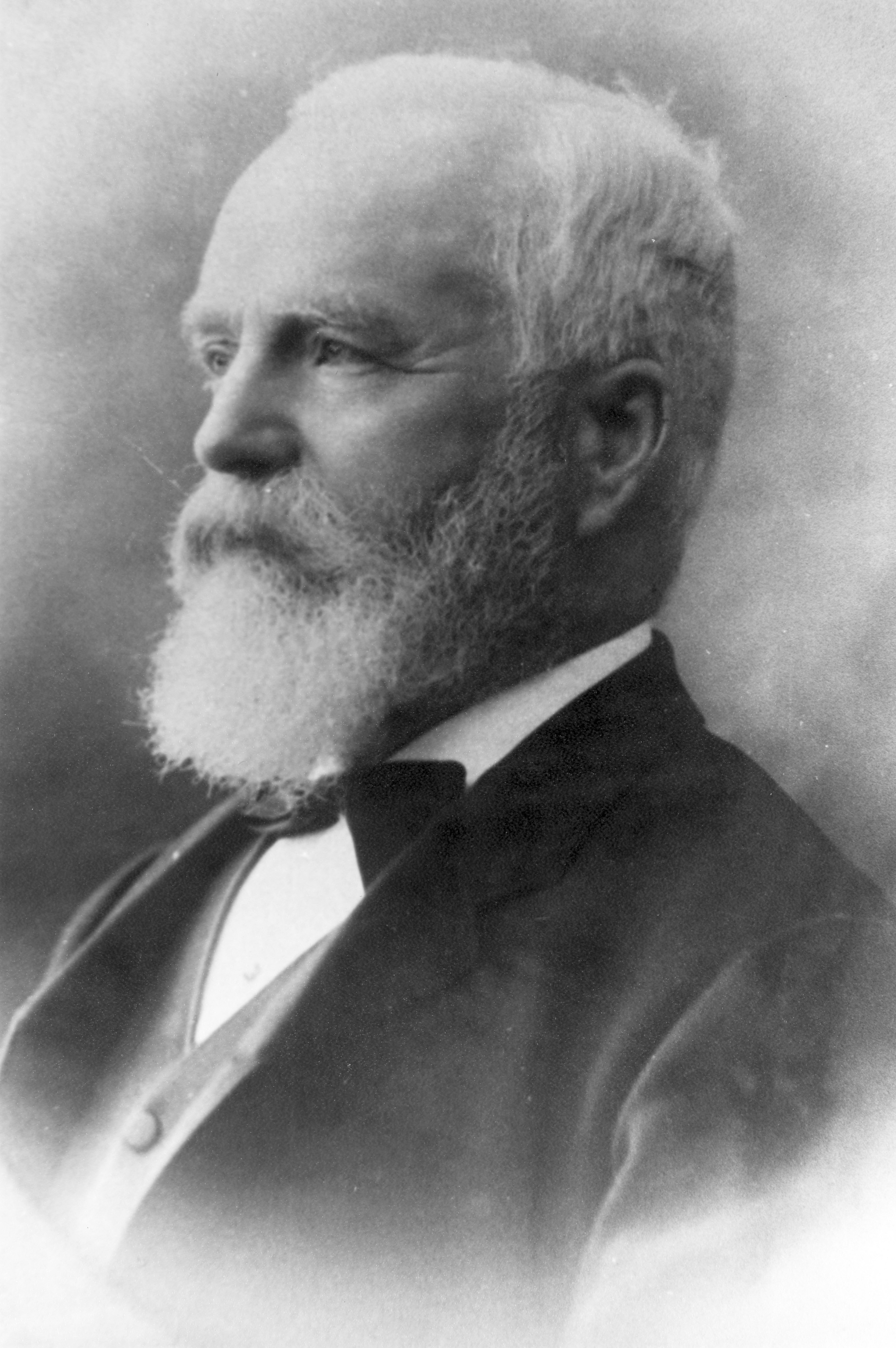
- Edward Richardson, c. 1894

4th Minister of Public Works
- In office 29 October 1872 – 4 January 1877
- Preceded by: new ministry
- Succeeded by: John Davies Ormond
- In office 16 September 1884 – 8 October 1887

Member of the New Zealand Parliament for Christchurch West
- In office 1871–1875
- Majority: 20

Member of the New Zealand Parliament for City of Christchurch
- In office 1876 – September 1879
- Succeeded by: George Grey
- In office November 1879 – 1881
- Preceded by: George Grey

Member of the New Zealand Parliament for Kaiapoi
- In office 1884–1890

Member of the New Zealand Legislative Council
- In office 1892–1899

Personal details
- Born: 7 November 1831 London, England
- Died: 26 February 1915 (aged 83) Wellington, New Zealand
- Spouse(s): Margaret (née Higgins; m. 1856–61); Frances Mary Elizabeth (née Corke; m 1864–?)
- Children: Edward, George, Charles E., (Mr.) E. F., Sydney, (Mrs.) Eardly Reynolds, Mollie Tripe
- Occupation: civil & mechanical engineer, businessman, politician, runholder

Edward Richardson CMG (7 November 1831 – 26 February 1915) was a New Zealand civil and mechanical engineer, and Member of Parliament. Born in England, he emigrated to Australia and continued there as a railway engineer. Having become a partner in a contracting firm, a large project caused him to move to Christchurch in New Zealand, in which country he lived for the rest of his life.

== Early life ==
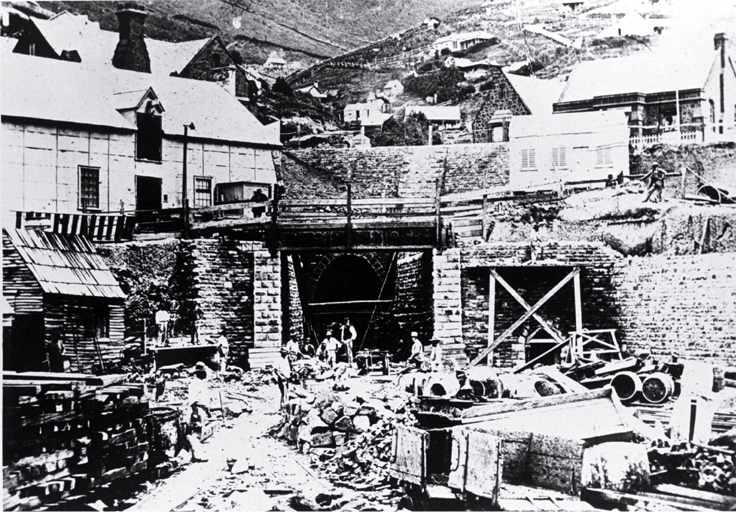
Lyttelton portal of the Lyttelton Rail Tunnel with construction workers in 1867

England

Richardson was born in London in 1831. His parents were Elizabeth Sarah Miller and her husband Richard Richardson (a merchant). He attended the City of London School.

Australia

In 1852, Richardson went to Melbourne in Australia. There, he married Margaret Higgins on 13 May 1856. They had two children before Margaret died in Melbourne in 1861. In his time in Australia, Richardson was also active in the volunteer brigade and became a captain in the horse artillery.

New Zealand

In 1861, Richardson emigrated to New Zealand to carry out the contract of building the Lyttelton Rail Tunnel. He married Frances Mary Elizabeth Corke at Holy Trinity Avonside on 27 April 1864.

== Professional career ==
England

Richardson trained as a civil engineer and worked for the London and South Western Railway (L&SWR). He then trained as a mechanical engineer while working for the Great Southern and Western Railway (GS&WR) in Ireland.

Australia

In Melbourne, he first worked for the Victorian Government in roading and bridge design, and then set up a partnership with George Holmes to perform general contracting work.

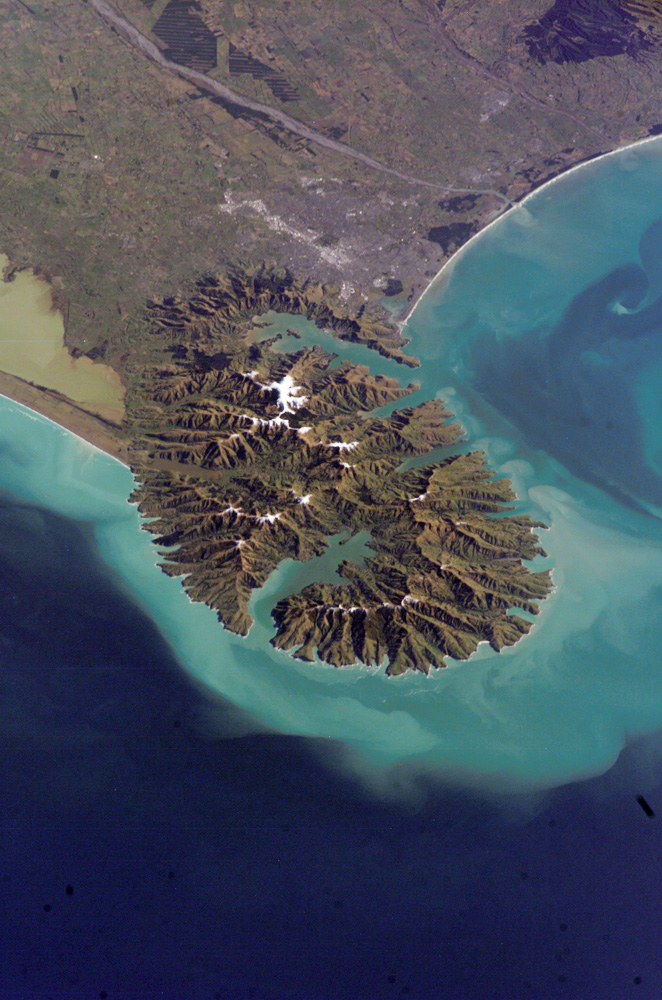
Richardson's tunnel allowed passage between Lyttelton Harbour and the Canterbury Plains (top)

New Zealand

The Canterbury Provincial Government had commissioned the construction of the Christchurch to Lyttelton railway and tunnel, but their first contractor (Smith & Knight) sought a significant additional payment over what had been agreed on, which the provincial government did not accept. William Moorhouse, the Superintendent (i.e. the elected head of the provincial council) at the time and proponent of the project, travelled to Melbourne to find a new contractor. Whilst the price submitted by Holmes and Richardson was the highest of three tenders, Moorhouse engaged them as he had confidence in their technical ability.

Richardson arrived in Lyttelton on the Prince Alfred in 1861 with 35 navvies and sufficient materials and equipment to begin the first stage of the railway between Christchurch and Ferrymead. During 1862, Richardson spent time in the European Alps to study the latest tunnel construction techniques and equipment on the Fréjus Rail Tunnel project. This experience was put to good use during the tunnel construction, which was carried out through volcanic rock.

The tunnel project, completed in 1867, was one of the greatest engineering achievements in early New Zealand. It was the colony's first rail tunnel and the first tunnel in the world to be driven through the side of an extinct volcano.

== Political career ==
=== Provincial Council ===
Richardson was elected onto the 6th Canterbury Provincial Council in May 1870 for the Town of Lyttelton electorate. He was re-elected in March 1874 for the 7th (and last) Council and held this role until the abolition of provincial government in October 1876.

=== Member of the lower house ===
New Zealand Parliament
Years	Term	Electorate	Party
1871–1876	5th	Christchurch West	Independent
1875–1879	6th	Christchurch	Independent
Nov 1879–1881	7th	Christchurch	Independent
1884	8th	Kaiapoi	Independent
1884–1887	9th	Kaiapoi	Independent
1887–1890	10th	Kaiapoi	Independent

Richardson and Henry Wynn-Williams stood in the Christchurch West electorate in the 1871 election, obtaining 234 and 214 votes, respectively. Richardson was thus declared elected.

In the 1875 election, he contested the City of Christchurch electorate. He came second in this three-member electorate (Edward Stevens came first, and William Moorhouse, the person who caused him to come to New Zealand, came third) and was thus returned.

He came fourth in the September 1879 election for the three-member Christchurch electorate (George Grey came first, and Samuel Paull Andrews and Edward Stevens came second with equal numbers of votes, and only 23 votes ahead of Richardson). He petitioned against George Grey's return on technical grounds, as Grey had already been elected in the Thames electorate. The electoral commission unseated Grey on 24 October, with Richardson offered to fill this vacancy a few days later. Grey was allowed to keep the Thames seat and remained a member of parliament through that constituency.

The City of Christchurch electorate was abolished at the end of the 7th session of parliament, and Richardson stood in Lyttelton in the 1881 election. He was narrowly defeated by Harry Allwright, who had a majority of 11 on Richardson. Ironically, Allwright had been the chair of the 1879 electoral commission, and it had been his casting vote that unseated Grey and thus allowed Richardson back into the lower house.

Following a petition, the 1881 general election in the Stanmore electorate was declared invalid. The resulting 12 July 1882 by-election was contested by Walter Pilliet, Richardson and William Patten Cowlishaw (a partner of Francis James Garrick). They received 469, 345 and 244 votes, respectively. Pilliet was declared elected with a majority of 124 votes.

Richardson stood in the 6 April 1883 by-election in the Selwyn electorate, coming second.

Richardson then stood in the 16 May 1884 by-election in the Kaiapoi electorate. He was returned unopposed and re-entered parliament.

Soon after, he contested the Kaiapoi seat in the 1884 general election and was confirmed by the voters. He was re-elected in the 1887 general election and represented Kaiapoi until the 1890 election, when he retired from the lower house.

=== Minister for Public Works ===
In October 1872, Richardson became a member of the Waterhouse Ministry, and held the portfolio of Public Works. He retained that position in the successive Fox, Vogel, Pollen and Atkinson ministries. Poor health brought on by overwork caused him to resign his ministerial role in January 1877.

As a public works expert, he was again appointed a Minister for Public Works under the Stout Vogel Government, and held the portfolio from September 1884 to October 1887. He was ranked third in cabinet below Robert Stout and Vogel. The family moved to Wellington in 1884 for this ministerial appointment.

=== Member of the upper house ===
Richardson was appointed to the Legislative Council on 15 October 1892 and remained a member until 15 October 1899, when his term ended.

== Later life ==
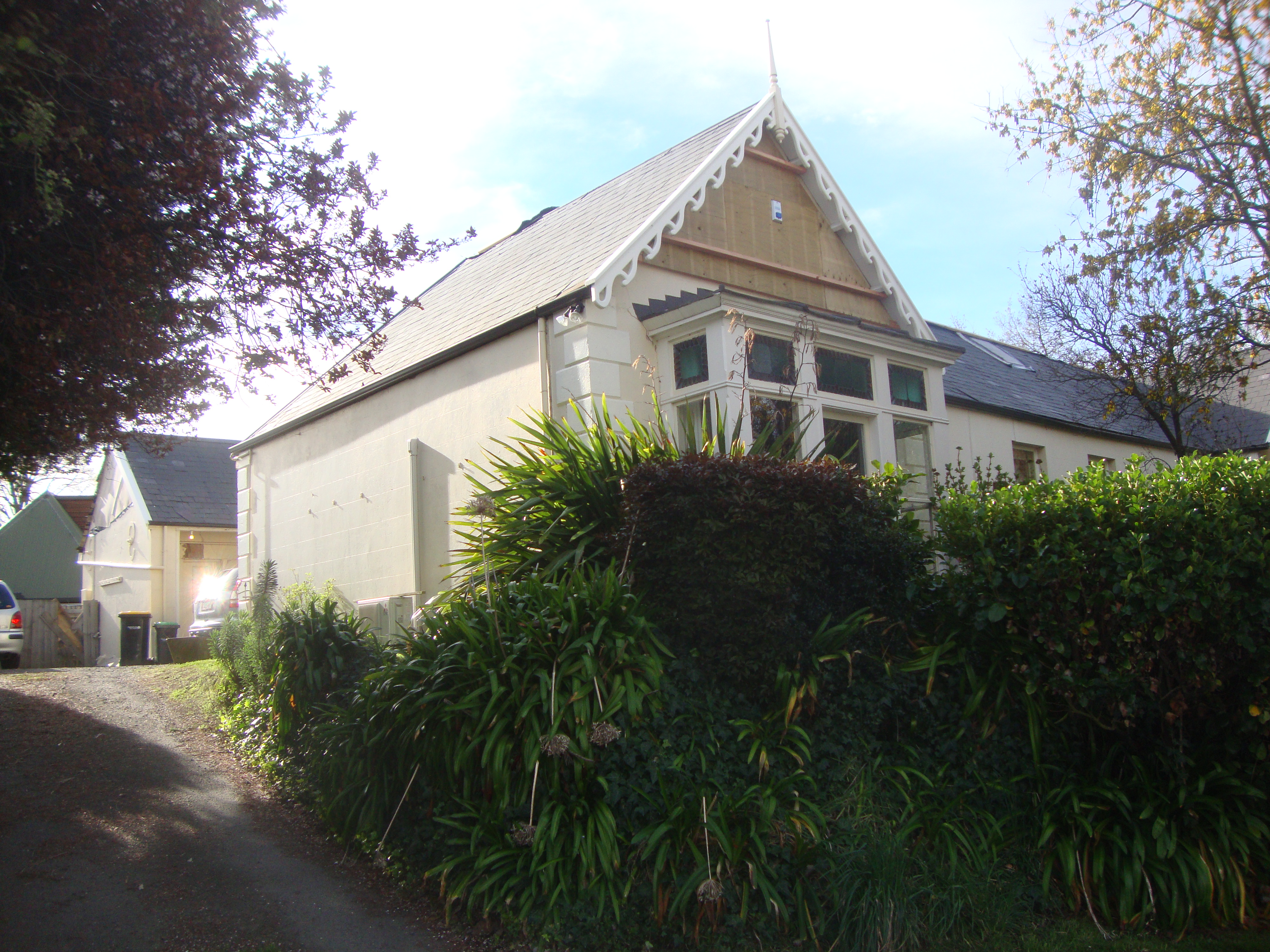
Richardson's residence, The Hollies, in 2011

Richardson bought the land around the Opawa railway station plus an adjacent 13 acres in 1871 and built his residence, The Hollies. It is believed that he designed the house himself, and it is broadly Australian in appearance. Stone from the tunnel project was used in the construction. Richardson was affected by the recession in the late 1880 and in 1889, the Bank of New Zealand repossessed the house and land, and onsold it to sheep farmer John Robert Campbell. The building is registered with Heritage New Zealand, and was registered on 24 June 2005 as a Category II heritage structure with registration number 3112.

Richardson was appointed Companion of the Order of St Michael and St George (CMG) in the 1879 Birthday Honours. His second wife (Frances) died on 1 October 1913. Richardson died in Wellington on 26 February 1915, and was survived by a son from his marriage with Margaret, and four sons and two daughters from his marriage with Frances, one of whom was the artist Mollie Tripe . He was interred at Karori Cemetery in Wellington.

His son, Sydney, stood as a candidate at the 1935 general election in the Christchurch East electorate in support of the United–Reform Coalition government.

New Zealand Parliament
New constituency	Member of Parliament for Selwyn; 1871–1875	Constituency abolished
In abeyance Title last held by William Sefton Moorhouse	Member of Parliament for Christchurch; 1875–1881; Served alongside: Edward Stevens, Samuel Paull Andrews, William Sefton Moorhouse	In abeyance Title next held by Westby Perceval; William Pember Reeves; Richard Molesworth Taylor
Preceded by Isaac Wilson	Member of Parliament for Kaiapoi; 1884–1890	Succeeded by Richard Moore
Political offices
First	Chairman of the Lyttelton Harbour Board; 1877–1882	Succeeded by Richard James Strachan Harman
