= Isaac Wilson (New Zealand politician) =

New Zealand politician (1840–1912)

New Zealand Parliament
Years	Term	Electorate	Party
1881–1884	8th	Kaiapoi	Independent

Isaac Wilson (1840 – 7 April 1912) was a 19th-century Member of Parliament in Canterbury, New Zealand. He represented the Kaiapoi electorate from 1881 to 7 April 1884, when he resigned because of failing health, and was replaced by Edward Richardson.

In 1897 he was on the Kaiapoi Licensing Committee. and a committee member for the Kaiapoi Brass Band.

He died in Sumner, Christchurch leaving a widow (Elizabeth) and young children. He was from Wray, Westmorland and arrived with his family in New Zealand about 1854. He had various business interests including the Kaiapoi Woollen Mills; and was on the Ashley County Council, the Kaiapoi Borough and the Canterbury Provincial Council before becoming an MP (MHR) in 1881, defeating the Liberal candidate.

New Zealand Parliament
Preceded by Charles Bowen	Member of Parliament for Kaiapoi; 1881–1884	Succeeded by Edward Richardson
