= Mayor of Lyttelton =

Head of a municipal government in New Zealand

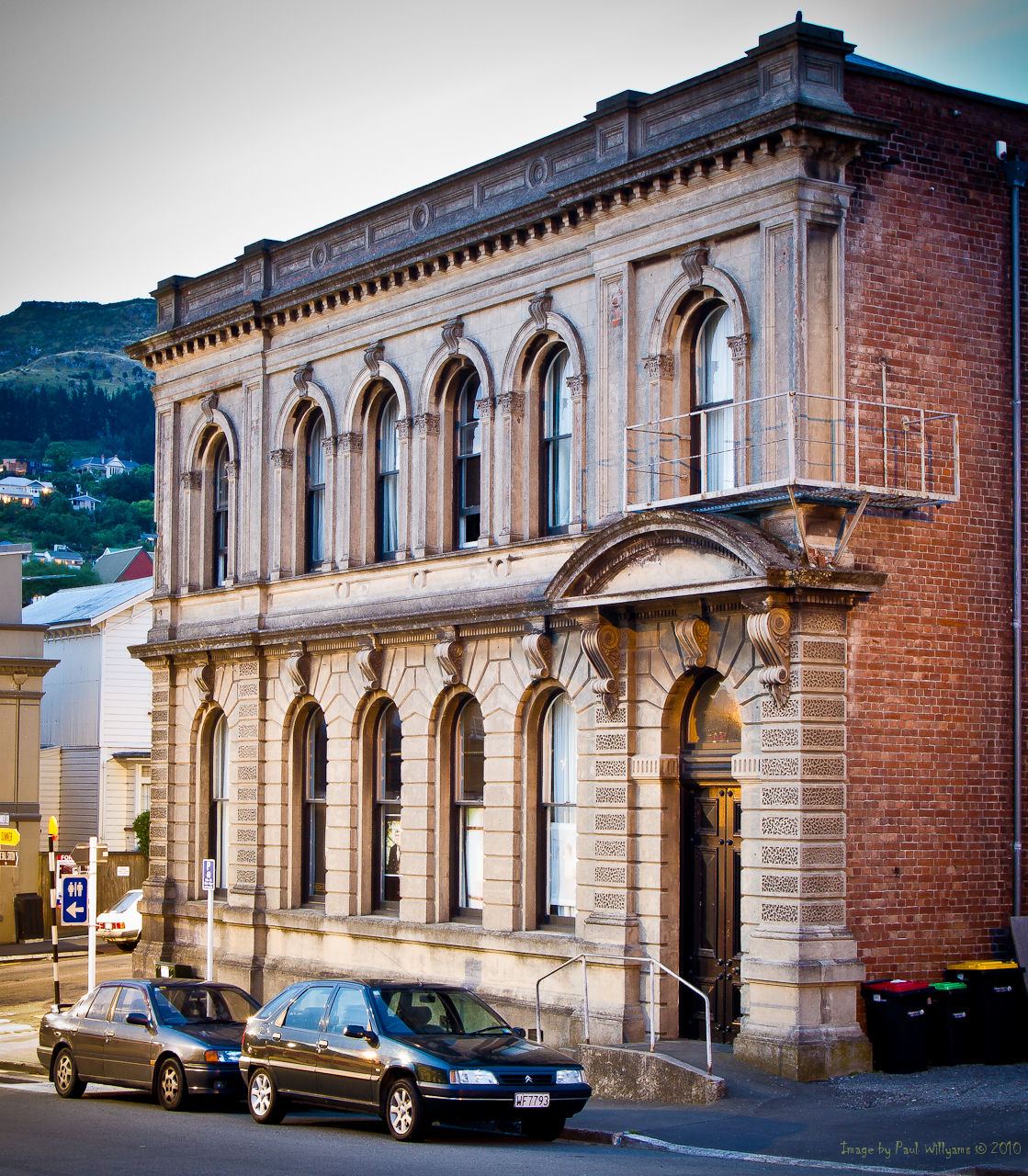
Lyttelton Borough Council Chambers in 2010 (since demolished)

The Mayor of Lyttelton was the head of the municipal government of Lyttelton, New Zealand. The position existed from 1868, when the Lyttelton Borough was established, until 1989 when the Lyttelton Borough Council merged with the Akaroa, Mt Herbert, and Wairewa County Councils, as part of the nationwide local government reforms, to form the Banks Peninsula District Council.

== History ==
=== Overview ===
The Lyttelton Municipal Council was established by a 10 December 1861 proclamation by the Superintendent of the Canterbury Province, William Sefton Moorhouse. The proclamation was published in the Provincial Gazette three days later. An election was held on 3 February 1862 that determined the composition of the first town council. The nine representatives had their first meeting four days later and had the task of electing a chairman from their midst and after a contested vote, Dr William Donald, their local doctor, became the head of the council. Donald was chairman until March 1865, when he resigned. Donald was succeeded by Edward Hargreaves for 1865–1866. When Hargreaves was elected to parliament for the Lyttelton electorate and had to then leave for Wellington in June 1866, he resigned from the municipal council. Joseph Ward was voted chairman for the remainder of 1866 and for 1867. Thomas Merson was the town council's last chairman in 1868.

The Borough of Lyttelton was inaugurated on 28 May 1868. Mayors were initially appointed and then elected for one year; elections started following the Municipal Corporations Act of 1876. This was changed to biennial elections "on the last Wednesday in April" with the Municipal Corporations Amendment Act, 1913. The act came into force in March 1915 and thus first applied at the April 1915 mayoral election. The Municipal Corporations Act, 1933 changed the mayoral term to three years, and this commenced with the 1935 mayoral election.

=== Annual appointments or elections ===
At the first meeting of the borough council on 10 June 1868, council members unanimously voted for Merson to become the first mayor of Lyttelton. John S. Willcox was re-elected in December 1869 after having served his first term, but he resigned in October 1870. On 24/25 October, the Lyttelton Fire destroyed two blocks along Norwich Quay, raising two-thirds of the town. Willcox lost his building and company and thus did not have the time to remain mayor. At the 7 November council meeting, councillor Harry Allwright was unanimously voted for as the new mayor. At the 21 December council meeting, Allwright was confirmed as mayor for 1871. At the 22 December 1871 council meeting, Allwright was re-elected as mayor for 1872.

Dr John T. Rouse was the last mayor who, in December 1874, was elected by his fellow councillors. In December 1875, electors were invited to choose their mayor. The incumbent was the only one who got nominated, hence he got declared elected unopposed. The first election that was contested was held on 20 December 1876, when the incumbent, Rouse, beat former mayor Allwright by 225 to 166 votes. With the Lyttelton Harbour Board to be formed in January 1877, and the mayor of Lyttelton being an Ex officio member of that board, Rouse thus gained an additional role. At the 19 November 1877 nomination, Allwright was the only candidate and thus declared elected unopposed. At the 19 November 1878 nomination, Allwright was again the only candidate. At the 26 November 1879 mayoral election, Allwright beat his challenger, Adam Chalmers, by 127 to 92 votes. At the 24 November 1880 election, Allwright beat off his challenger Samuel R. Webb by 197 to 108 votes. At the 30 November 1881 election, the result between Allwright and Webb was much closer, with just nine votes between them. Allwright retired at the end of his 1882 term and the 29 November 1882 election was won by Webb, who beat Bryan Weyburne by 195 votes to 131. At the 28 November 1883, Webb was challenged by Hugh Macdonald and was reconfirmed by a one-vote-margin: 158 votes to 157. Webb retired after the 1884 term and the 26 November 1884 election was won by former mayor Chalmers, who beat William Reed by 112 votes to 87. In the following year, Chalmers was unopposed in his mayoral candidacy. Four candidates were nominated for the 1886 election but one of them pulled out before election day. Former mayor Allwright was successful with 156, with Hugh McLellan and Samuel Webb getting 94 and 72 votes, respectively. The 30 November 1887 mayoral election was contested by former mayor Webb and James Boyton Milsom, won by Webb with 181 votes to 130. The same candidates contested the 28 November 1888 mayoral election, with the incumbent again successful, having received 194 votes to Milsom's 136. Webb retired in 1889, and the election on 27 November was contested by Milsom and Captain Hugh McLellan, with Milson narrowly winning by 138 votes to 134. Milson and McLellan contested the mayoral election on 26 November 1890, with Milsom this time having a clear lead with 242 votes to 113. Former mayor Allwright and councillors McLellan and Joseph Thomas Brice contested the 25 November 1891 election, with Brice successful at 150 votes, compared to 101 and 82 for McLellan and Allwright, respectively. At the 30 November 1892 mayoral election, Brice was challenged by three others and gained 114 votes compared to 93 votes by John Thompson, who came second. Thompson won the election the following year, held on 29 November 1893, against Nicholas Carl Schumacher and Captain McLellan. At the 28 November 1894 election, Thompson was challenged by three borough councillors and came last. The election was won by Schumacher. Schumacher stood for re-election on 27 November 1895 but was challenged by three councillors. John Stinson won the election, with Schumacher coming third. Stinson stood for re-election on 25 November 1896 and was challenged by two borough councillors. In a close race, former mayor Adam Chalmers came out on top with 136 votes, defeating William Radcliffe and Stinton with 129 and 114 votes, respectively. In November 1897, Chalmers was the only person nominated for mayor and he was thus declared elected unopposed. At the 30 November 1898 mayoral election, Chalmers was beaten by councillor William Radcliffe by 201 votes to 108. At the 29 November 1899 mayoral election, Radcliffe was challenged by Colin Cook, with Radcliffe beating the challenger by 251 votes to 216.

An Act of Parliament extended the 1900 term of local government to April 1901. Radcliffe tendered his resignation at the end of the normal term, which caused a by-election that was held on 14 December 1900. Two candidates contested the election: James Grubb and Thomas C. Field. There was considerable more interest in the election as it coincided with the 50th anniversary of Canterbury, with the First Four Ships having arrived from 16 December 1850 onwards. Field won the election with 403 votes to 311. The same candidates contested the 23 April 1901 election, with the incumbent beating Grubb by 377 votes to 326. Field retired in April 1902 and the mayoralty was contested by Grubb and Samuel R. Webb, with a decisive win for Grubb with 464 votes to 184. Grubb was challenged at the 29 April 1903 by two others, with former mayor Radcliffe successful at 275 votes to 248 votes for Grubb, and William Whitby trailing at 179 votes. Samuel R. Webb and Charles Kay contested the 27 April 1904 mayoral election, with Webb successful at 387 votes to 106. Webb, the incumbent, was the sole candidate in April 1905 and was declared elected unopposed. At the 25 April 1906 mayoral election, Webb was challenged by former mayor Radcliffe but retained his position, with 354 votes to 236. Former mayor Brice and councillor Colin Kay challenged Webb for the mayoralty at the 24 April 1907 election, but Webb had a comfortable win. At the 29 April 1908 mayoral election, Colin Cook beat the incumbent with 427 votes to 373. At the 28 April 1909 mayoral election, Cook was challenged by John Richard Webb (brother of Samuel R. Webb). Cook held onto the mayoralty, getting 520 votes to Webb's 440. Cook retired in 1910 and at the 27 April election, J. R. Webb and Malcolm James Miller contested the position. Miller was successful, with 529 votes to 479. In April 1911, Miller was confirmed elected unopposed. In 1912, Miller was challenged by councillor William Thomas Lester at the 24 April mayoral election. Miller was once again successful, gaining 483 votes to 408.

The local election held on 30 April 1913 brought some surprises. In the mayoral election, it was generally not expected that John Richard Webb would defeat the local member of parliament, George Laurenson, but Webb had 608 votes to Laurenson's 490. In the election for the borough council, former mayor Colin Cook topped the poll by a comfortable margin but within minutes of giving his victory speech, he collapsed and died while the second councillor was talking. In April 1914, J. R. Webb was returned to the mayoralty unopposed for another year.

=== Biennial elections ===
The 28 April 1915 election saw the start of biennial mayoral terms. Webb retired, and the contest was between former mayor Radcliffe and John Harry Collins. Radcliffe was elected, with 651 votes to 343. During a holiday in Dunedin in late December 1916, mayor Radcliffe suffered a paralytic stroke. During his absence, councillor James Talbot Norton deputised for him. It was not before 1 March 1917 that Radcliffe was well enough to return to Lyttelton. Norton continued to chair every borough council meeting until the election in April 1917; Radcliffe did not return to council. There were widespread calls for Norton to stand for the mayoralty, but he explained that he had given councillor Foster an assurance that he would not oppose him for the 1917 mayoral election. William Thomas Foster and William Thomas Lester contested the election on 25 April 1917, Lester was successful, with 691 votes to 401. Lester was unopposed in April 1919 and declared elected. At the 27 April 1921 mayoral election, Lester was challenged by councillor Norton (the 1917 deputy-mayor), but the incumbent retained the voter's support with 746 votes to 358. The 26 April 1923 mayoral election was a repeat of the 1917 election, with Foster and Lester the candidates. The outcome was also the same, with Lester gaining 784 votes to Foster's 543. The 29 April 1925 saw a record four contenders, with the incumbent challenged by Foster, Frederick George Norton, and Frederick Ernest Sutton. Sutton had a narrow victory of just 12 votes over Lester (537 votes to 525), with the other candidates well beaten. Lester and Thomas Bertinus Hempstalk challenged Sutton at the 27 April 1927 mayoral election, but Sutton had 886 votes, compared to 436 and 247 for Lester and Hempstalk. Sutton retired in 1929 and three candidates contested the mayoral election on 1 May 1929: William Thomas Foster (800 votes), Archibald McDonald (466 votes), and Walter Warren Toy (236 votes). Foster, at his fourth attempt (he had been unsuccessful in 1917, 1923, and 1925) was declared elected. The 1931 mayoralty election was keenly contested, with all three candidates having been mayor before. The incumbent was challenged by Lester and Sutton, with Sutton having a narrow lead over Foster (634 votes to 611, and 460 votes for Lester). Lester challenged Sutton once more at the 3 May 1933 mayoral election and regained the mayoralty.

=== Triennial elections ===
The 8 May 1935 election saw the start of triennial mayoral terms. Sutton challenged the incumbent Lester and had a massive majority, with 1449 votes to 408. The 11 May 1938 mayoral election was contested by the incumbent, Sutton, and former mayoral candidate Walter Warren Toy. Sutton had a comfortable lead, with 1108 votes to 613. Lester and Sutton once more contested the mayoralty at the 17 May 1941 election, with Sutton fending off the challenger by 776 votes to 672. Sutton retired in 1944, and the 27 May mayoral election was fought by Lester and councillor Arthur Knight Dyne. Lester had a comfortable win, with 1042 votes to 514.

The next office holder was William Thomas Lindsay. He died in office on 22 June 1948. Frederick Briggs won the resulting 3 August 1948 by-election. Within weeks, a charge of bookmaking was brought against the mayor. He pleaded guilty and resigned a few days later on 1 December 1948. Briggs contested the resulting 11 January 1949 by-election and was challenged by former mayor Sutton, with Briggs having a narrow lead of 887 votes to 820. Briggs was mayor until 1959, when he retired. Bruce Collett had first contested the mayoralty in 1956. He succeeded in 1959 and was mayor for two terms until he was defeated. He regained the mayoralty and served three more terms until he retired in 1977. He was succeeded by councillor Melvyn Ewell Foster who was the secretary of the Lyttelton Waterfront Workers Union.

=== 1989 local government reforms ===
As part of the nationwide local government reforms in 1989, the Akaroa, Mt Herbert, and Wairewa County Councils, and Lyttelton Borough Council merged to become the Banks Peninsula District Council.

== Lists of chairmen and mayors of Lyttelton ==
=== Chairmen of Lyttelton ===
The Lyttelton Municipal Council had the following chairmen:

	Name	Term
i	William Donald	1862–1865
ii	Edward Hargreaves	1865–1866
i	Joseph Ward	1866–1867
iv	Thomas Merson	1868

=== Mayors of Lyttelton ===
Lyttelton Borough Council had the following mayors:

	Name	Term
1	Thomas Merson	1868
2	John Smith Willcox	1868–1870
3	Harry Allwright	1870–1872
4	Adam Chalmers	1872–1874
5	Dr John T. Rouse	1874–1877
(3)	Harry Allwright (2nd)	1877–1882
6	Samuel R. Webb	1882–1884
(4)	Adam Chalmers (2nd)	1884–1886
(3)	Harry Allwright (3rd)	1886–1887
(6)	Samuel R. Webb (2nd)	1887–1889
7	James B. Milsom	1889–1891
8	Joseph Thomas Brice	1891–1893
9	John Thompson	1893–1894
10	Nicholas Carl Schumacher	1894–1895
11	John Stinson	1895–1896
(4)	Adam Chalmers (3rd)	1896–1898
12	William Radcliffe	1898–1900
13	Thomas C. Field	1900–1902
14	James Grubb	1902–1903
(12)	William Radcliffe (2nd)	1903–1904
(6)	Samuel R. Webb (3rd)	1904–1908
15	Colin Cook	1908–1910
16	Malcolm Miller	1910–1913
17	John Richard Webb	1913–1914
(12)	William Radcliffe (3rd)	1914–1917
18	William Thomas Lester	1917–1925
19	Frederick Ernest Sutton	1925–1929
20	William Thomas Foster	1929–1931
(19)	Frederick Ernest Sutton (2nd)	1931–1933
(18)	William Thomas Lester (2nd)	1933–1935
(19)	Frederick Ernest Sutton (3rd)	1935–1944
(18)	William Thomas Lester (3rd)	1944–1947
21	William Thomas Lindsay	1947–1948
22	Frederick Briggs	1948
(22)	Frederick Briggs	1949–1959
23	Bruce Collett	1959–1965
(22)	Frederick Briggs	1965–1968
(23)	Bruce Collett	1968–1977
24	Melvyn Ewell Foster	1977–1989
