= Charles Bowen (New Zealand politician) =

New Zealand politician (1830–1917)

The Honourable Sir Charles Bowen KCMG
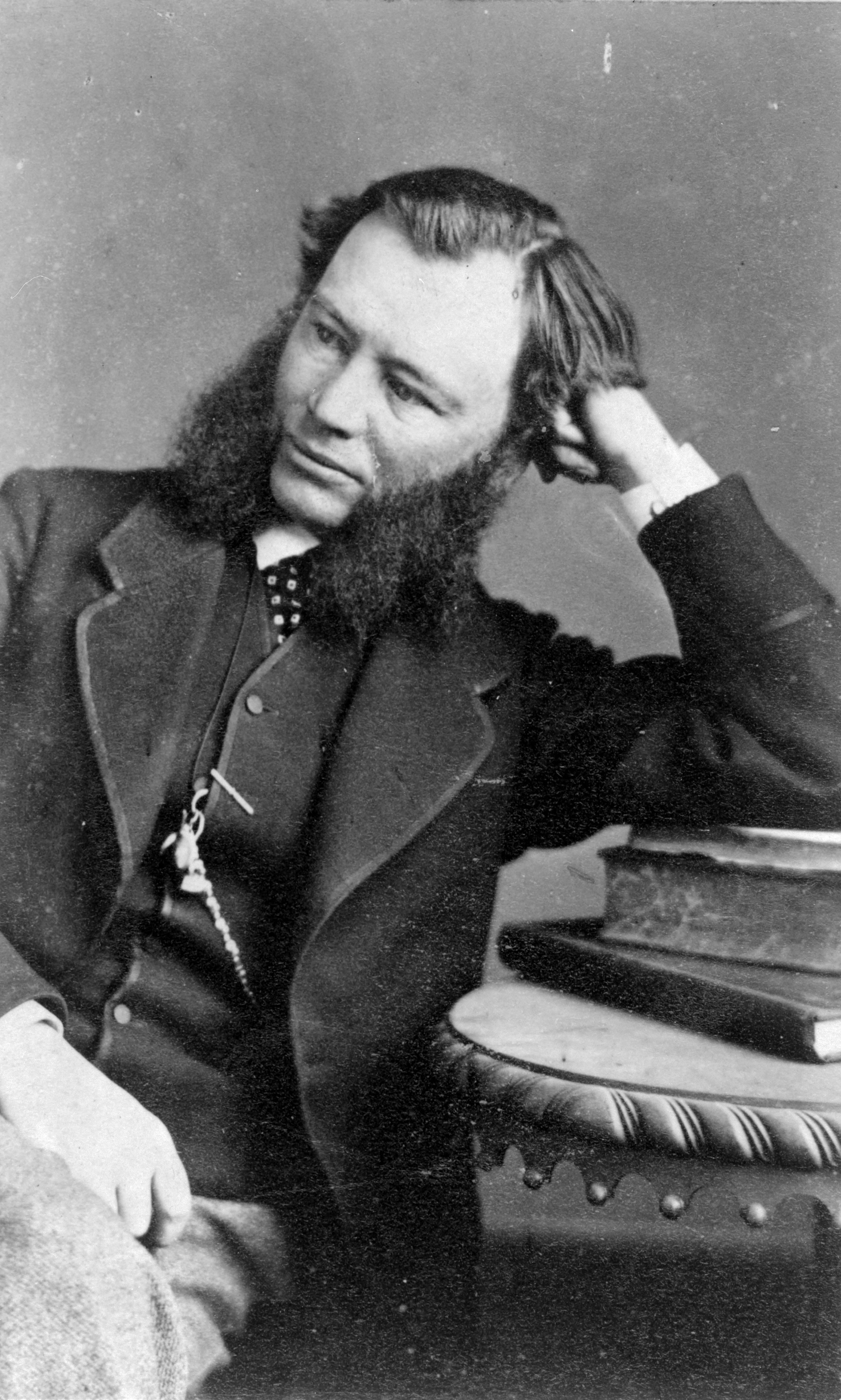
- Charles Christopher Bowen

13th Speaker of the Legislative Council
- In office 30 June 1905 – 4 July 1915
- Preceded by: Richard Reeves
- Succeeded by: Charles Johnston

Personal details
- Born: 29 August 1830 County Mayo, Ireland
- Died: 12 December 1917 (aged 87) Riccarton, Christchurch, New Zealand
- Party: Independent

Sir Charles Christopher Bowen KCMG (29 August 1830 – 12 December 1917) was a New Zealand politician.

== Life ==
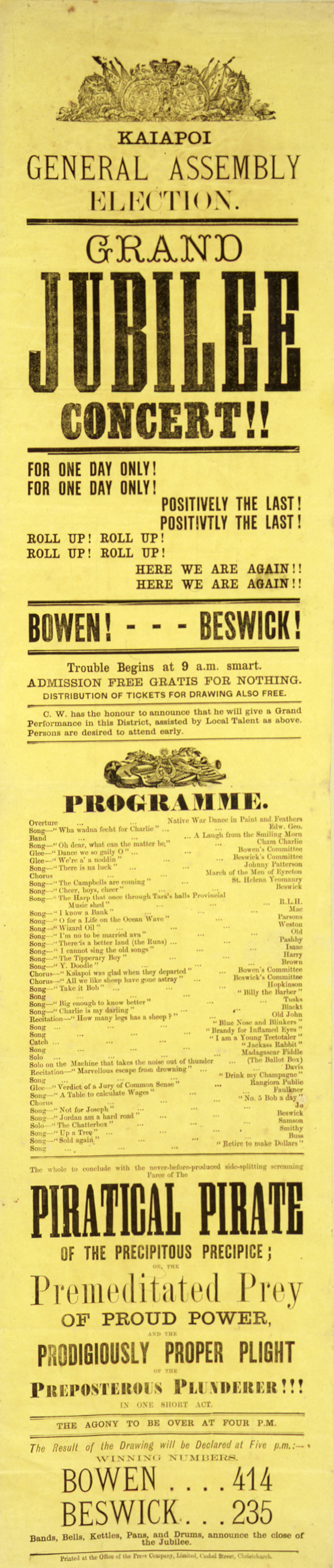
Satirical political poster printed for the Kaiapoi 1875 general election

Bowen was born in County Mayo, Ireland and studied law for two years at Cambridge University. At the age of 20 he emigrated with his parents on one of the First Four Ships, the Charlotte Jane, to the Canterbury settlement.

His law training led to a position as private secretary to John Robert Godley, founder of the Canterbury colony. He was in charge of the police force, and, together with Crosbie Ward, became a part-owner of the Lyttelton Times newspaper.

In 1859, Bowen traversed the Andes on with Clements Markham, and 16 July 1861, he married his sister Georgina Elizabeth Markham.

The same year he dedicated a volume of poetry, Poems, to "my fellow colonists, the first settlers of Canterbury, New Zealand.". The high quality of the edition is proof that "good craftsmen migrated along with the gentlemen-colonists".

Following their return to Christchurch, Bowen was appointed resident magistrate in 1864, succeeding Joseph Brittan, who had resigned on health grounds. Bowen held the position until 1874.

== Political career ==
New Zealand Parliament
Years	Term	Electorate	Party
1875	5th	Kaiapoi	Independent
1875–1879	6th	Kaiapoi	Independent
1879–1881	7th	Kaiapoi	Independent

Bowen was directly appointed to cabinet (by way of the Legislative Council) on 16 December 1874, but wary of criticism that a public servant had been awarded political office, he resigned from the Legislative Council and stood for election to the House of Representatives in the 22 January 1875 Kaiapoi by-election, following the resignation of John Studholme on 8 December 1874. He was confirmed by the Kaiapoi electorate at general elections in 1875 and 1879 and served until the end of the 7th Parliament in 1881, when he retired. From 1874 to 1877, he was Minister of Justice in five successive ministries (first Vogel Ministry, Pollen Ministry, second Vogel Ministry, first and second Atkinson Ministry). Bowen was responsible for the Education Act 1877, which provided for compulsory free, secular primary education.

He was again appointed to the Legislative Council on 20 January 1891 and served until his death on 12 December 1917. He was appointed as one of seven new members (including Harry Atkinson himself) appointed to the council by the outgoing fourth Atkinson Ministry; a move regarded by Liberals as a stacking of the upper house against the new government.

He was appointed Speaker of the Legislative Council from 1905 to 1915.

Bowen was made a Knight Bachelor in 1910 and a Knight Commander of the Order of St Michael and St George in 1914. He had seven children. He died on 12 December 1917 at his homestead and is buried at the cemetery of St Peter's Church in Upper Riccarton.

== Notes ==
Political offices
Preceded by Maurice O'Rorke	Minister of Justice; 1874–1877	Succeeded by John Sheehan
Preceded by Richard Reeves	Speaker of the New Zealand Legislative Council; 1905–1915	Succeeded by Charles Johnston
New Zealand Parliament
Preceded by John Studholme	Member of Parliament for Kaiapoi; 1875–1881	Succeeded by Isaac Wilson
