= Robert Wilkin (politician) =

New Zealand politician (1820–1886)

New Zealand Parliament
Years	Term	Electorate	Party
1863–1866	3rd	Kaiapoi	Independent

Robert Wilkin (1820–1886) was a 19th-century Member of Parliament in Canterbury, New Zealand.

He represented the Kaiapoi electorate from 1863 to 1866, when he retired.

He was a member of the Canterbury Provincial Council. At first, he represented the Timaru electorate (1860–1862), then the Town of Timaru electorate (1862–1864) and then the Waitangi electorate (1864–1866). From July 1860 to November 1863, and from October 1866 to March 1868, he was a member of the Canterbury Executive Council. He was the province's Deputy Superintendent from 19 July to 14 September 1863.

== Notes ==
New Zealand Parliament
Preceded by Isaac Cookson	Member of Parliament for Kaiapoi; 1863–1866	Succeeded by Joseph Beswick
