= Morgan Williams (politician) =

New Zealand politician

Morgan Williams MBE
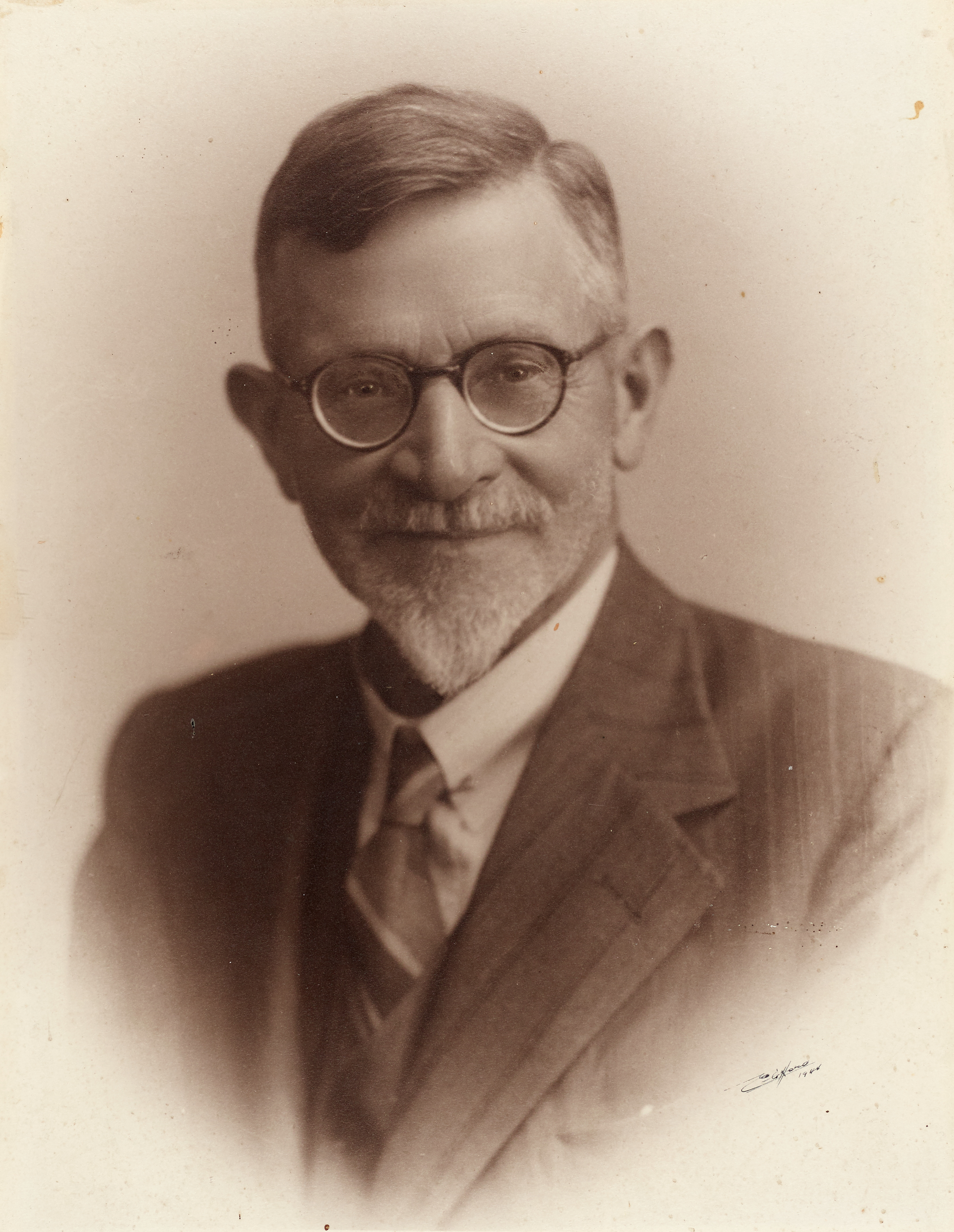
- Williams in 1944

Member of the New Zealand Parliament for Kaiapoi
- In office 1935–1946

Personal details
- Born: Charles Morgan Williams; 21 April 1878 Newtown, Wales
- Died: 4 August 1970 (aged 92)
- Party: Labour
- Relations: Morgan Williams (grandson)

Charles Morgan Williams MBE (21 April 1878 – 4 August 1970) was a mayor and Member of Parliament for Kaiapoi in Canterbury, New Zealand.

== Early years: farming and business ==
Williams was born on 21 April 1878 in Newtown, Wales. He was the son of C. W. Williams. He received his education at Woodbridge Grammar School. He worked as a letter sorter in the south-west district of London from 1897 to 1901. There he was active in the Battersea Branch of the British Social Democratic Federation and later secretary of the Clapham Branch.

He came to New Zealand in 1902, and worked as a farm labourer in the Kaiapoi district until 1906, when he bought and leased land in the Tram Road area and grew potatoes. On the peat land he developed an extensive drainage system to allow dairy farming and founded the Maesgwyn herd of pedigree Ayrshire cattle. Williams purchased the property known as "Waverley" from Richard Evans in 1925. He also established the grain and produce business of C. Morgan Williams and Son in Charles Street, Kaiapoi.

== Afforestation ==
Morgan Williams was closely associated with afforestation at Kaiapoi for over fifty years. He undertook block plantings on Council Reserves, and at Ohoka, Clarkville and Mandeville North. In 1939 he was appointed by the Kaiapoi Borough Council as honorary supervisor of forests. At a public meeting in 1955, Williams received a presentation from the mayor Norman Kirk, in recognition of his service to the borough and his care of 245 acres of forest reserves.

== Public service ==
New Zealand Parliament
Years	Term	Electorate	Party
1935–1938	25th	Kaiapoi	Labour
1938–1943	26th	Kaiapoi	Labour
1943–1946	27th	Kaiapoi	Labour

Williams' local body activities began with his election to the Kaiapoi Borough Council in 1927. He remained a Kaiapoi Borough councillor until 1935. He was elected mayor in 1948 and served one three-year term.

He joined the Social Democratic Party in 1913. He stood unsuccessfully for Labour in Kaiapoi in 1919, 1922, and 1925, and Mid-Canterbury in 1928.

He represented the Canterbury electorate of Kaiapoi from 1935 to 1946, when he was defeated standing for St Albans.

Williams was appointed a Member of the Order of the British Empire, for public services, in the 1956 Queen's Birthday Honours, but for the rest of his life, he did not wear the medal as he considered it a community, and not a personal commendation. Williams was a chairman of the Dairy Produce Marketing Commission.

According to Barry Gustafson, he was regarded by some observers and colleagues as somewhat eccentric, but undoubtedly intelligent and able, though in accusing Savage of favouring fellow Catholics (from 1935) he was bigoted. He was one of John A. Lee's closest caucus friends. Ormond Wilson, in his "An Outsider Looks Back: Reflections on Experience" details Morgan Williams clash with Walter Nash on the Universal Family Benefit ("the well-to-do already had theirs-tax rebates"), and Bob Semple on freedom of speech laws with Semple boasting would "not allow Communist literature in Public Work Camps".

== Family and death ==
In 1907, he married Catherine, the daughter of T. Breeze. They had four sons and two daughters. Williams died on 4 August 1970 at Christchurch. By his personal request, the funeral service was conducted by a former Minister of Finance, and parliamentary colleague, the Hon. Sir Arnold Nordmeyer.

A son, Charles Thomas Williams, was also involved in local body affairs in Kaiapoi. Charles Williams was first elected to the council in 1937, serving at different times for more than twenty years altogether. He was deputy mayor under Norman Kirk from 1953 to 1957 and assumed the mayoralty when Kirk entered parliament. A grandson, also called Morgan Williams, was a Parliamentary Commissioner for the Environment.

== Quotes ==
On public service

- In 1965, Morgan Williams made his last attendance at the Kaiapoi Council Chambers (at the installation of the newly elected Council) and said: "the willingness of citizens to give their services free to the community was the very foundation of the democratic system of life".

On Peter Fraser

- "I have heard it said that he (Peter Fraser) forgets nothing and forgives nothing".
- "As a party tactician Peter Fraser has no equal, he knows when to bounce and bluster his way out of a difficulty".

== Book ==
Williams wrote a book on his life, which is held at the Canterbury Museum Research Centre. It is an account of his early struggles and personal and political philosophy.

== Notes ==
New Zealand Parliament
Preceded by Richard Hawke	Member of Parliament for Kaiapoi; 1935–1946	Constituency abolished
