= Harry Allwright =

New Zealand politician (1837–1892)

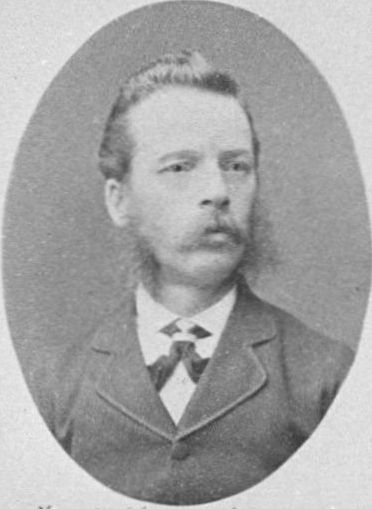
- Allwright in 1882

Member of the New Zealand Parliament for Lyttelton
- In office 4 September 1879 – 15 July 1887

Personal details
- Born: 1837 Kent, England
- Died: 18 July 1892 (aged 54–55) Christchurch Central City, New Zealand
- Party: Independent
- Children: none
- Occupation: Painter and glazier

Harry Allwright (1837 – 18 July 1892) was a 19th-century Member of Parliament in Canterbury, New Zealand. A painter and glazier by trade, he came out with his parents and siblings in the Cressy in 1850, one of the First Four Ships. He took over his father's company in 1859 and became involved in local politics. He first became Mayor of Lyttelton in 1870 and was re-elected seven times. In the 1879 New Zealand general election, he defeated the incumbent and represented the Lyttelton electorate for three parliamentary terms until his own defeat in 1887. He died in 1892.

== Early life ==
Allwright was born in 1837. He arrived in Lyttelton on the Cressy on 27 December 1850 with his parents, a brother, and some sisters. He was thus one of the Canterbury Pilgrims. He worked for his father, who was a painter and glazier. Upon his father Henry's death in 1859, he took over the business. When he was elected to parliament, his brother took over the business.

Allwright was a prominent sportsman and the president of the yacht club. He was an accomplished singer and regularly performed as a soloist with the Lyttelton Choral Union.

On 27 April 1866, Allwright married Matilda Lyons at the Wesleyan Chapel at Lyttelton. His wife, a widow, was also from Lyttelton and had also arrived in New Zealand on the Cressy.

== Political career ==
New Zealand Parliament
Years	Term	Electorate	Party
1879–1881	7th	Lyttelton	Independent
1881–1884	8th	Lyttelton	Independent
1884–1887	9th	Lyttelton	Independent

He stood for the Lyttelton municipal council in January 1867 and was one of six candidates for four positions, but he came last. In January 1868, he was one of eleven or twelve (sources differ) candidates for seven available positions on the municipal council, and with the second highest number of votes he was declared elected. His term came to an end in September 1869 and of eight candidates for six positions, he came second. On 24/25 October 1870, the Lyttelton Fire destroyed two blocks along Norwich Quay, raising two-thirds of the town. The mayor, John S. Willcox, lost his building and company and thus did not have the time to remain mayor. At the 7 November council meeting, councillor Allwright was unanimously voted for as the new mayor and re-elected at the 21 December council meeting for the coming year. Allwright was Mayor of Lyttelton for seven years (1871, 1872, 1878–1882, 1887). He was a proponent for the Lyttelton Borough Council to build civic offices and the foundation stone for the Lyttelton Borough Council Chambers was laid in January 1887, just after Allwright's final election as mayor; his name was thus inscribed in the foundation stone: "H. Allwright, Mayor, 1887"

In 1879, he successfully contested the Lyttelton electorate against the incumbent Hugh Murray-Aynsley. He represented Lyttelton until 1887 when he was defeated by John Joyce.

== Death ==
He died on 18 July 1892 at 277 Armagh Street, Christchurch Central City, after having been ill for several months, aged 55. He was married; the couple had no children. His wife died in 1906.

New Zealand Parliament
Preceded by Hugh Murray-Aynsley	Member of Parliament for Lyttelton; 1879–1887	Succeeded by John Joyce
Political offices
Preceded by John Smith Willcox	Mayor of Lyttelton; 1870–1872; 1877–1882; 1886–1887	Succeeded by Adam Chalmers
Preceded by Dr John T. Rouse	Mayor of Lyttelton; 1870–1872; 1877–1882; 1886–1887	Succeeded by Samuel R. Webb
Preceded by Adam Chalmers	Mayor of Lyttelton; 1870–1872; 1877–1882; 1886–1887	Succeeded by Samuel R. Webb
