= Robert McDougall =

Robert McDougall may refer to:

- Robert McDougall (politician) (1813–1887), member of the Victorian Legislative Assembly
- Robert McDougall (philanthropist) (1860–1942), businessman, and philanthropist from Christchurch, New Zealand
  - Robert McDougall Art Gallery

== See also ==
- Robert MacDougall (1876–1950), Canadian ice hockey player and businessman
- Bob McDougall (1894–1936), Scottish footballer
- Bob McDougal (1921–2003), American football player
