= Psyche (painting) =

1902 painting by Solomon Joseph Solomon

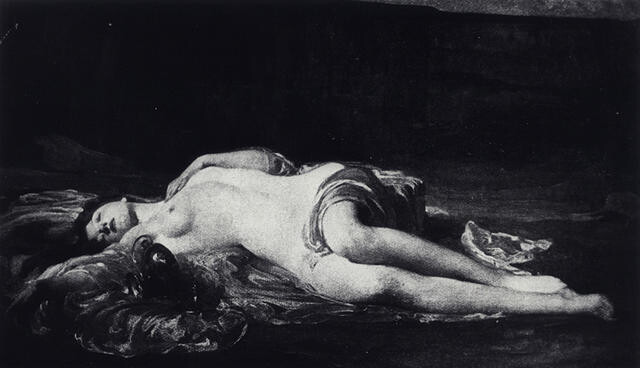
- Artist: Solomon Joseph Solomon
- Year: 1902
- Medium: Oil on canvas
- Movement: Academic art
- Dimensions: 90 cm × 153 cm (35 in × 60 in)
- Location: Robert McDougall Art Gallery, Christchurch, New Zealand

Psyche was a 1902 oil painting by Solomon Joseph Solomon. It was stolen in 1942, and never recovered.

This painting is an example of one of Solomon's common subject matters, Greek mythology, that marked him as part of the end of European academic tradition using Hellenic models.

== Description ==
Psyche, the mythological wife of Cupid, is depicted as a reclining nude in bed with a cup fallen beside her, cloth draped over her body but not concealing her from the viewer. The painting is so large as to have the subject nearly life-sized.

== Background ==
The picture was originally displayed at the Royal Academy Exhibition of 1902 at Burlington House in London. The painting was moved to Christchurch in 1907, and exhibited at the New Zealand International Exhibition. During the exhibition, it was purchased with other works for a total of £440 by the The Canterbury Society Of Arts, who exhibited it at their gallery. It was delivered to the Robert McDougall Art Gallery in Christchurch, New Zealand, in 1932.

== Theft ==
On June 21 or 22, 1942, the painting was removed from its frame and stolen from the Robert McDougall Art Gallery in Christchurch. It has never been found.

In 2014, Penelope Jackson and two other people staged a re-enactment of the theft, climbing onto the Robert McDougall Gallery's roof. The painting provides the cover of Jackson's 2016 book "Art Thieves, Fakes & Fraudsters: The New Zealand Story".

== Frame ==
After the painting was stolen, its gold frame remained in the gallery's collection.

The frame was on display from September 2016–January 2017 at Waikato Museum in an exhibition curated by Penelope Jackson called An Empty Frame: Crimes of Art in New Zealand.
