= Ajax and Cassandra =

Painting by Solomon Joseph Solomon

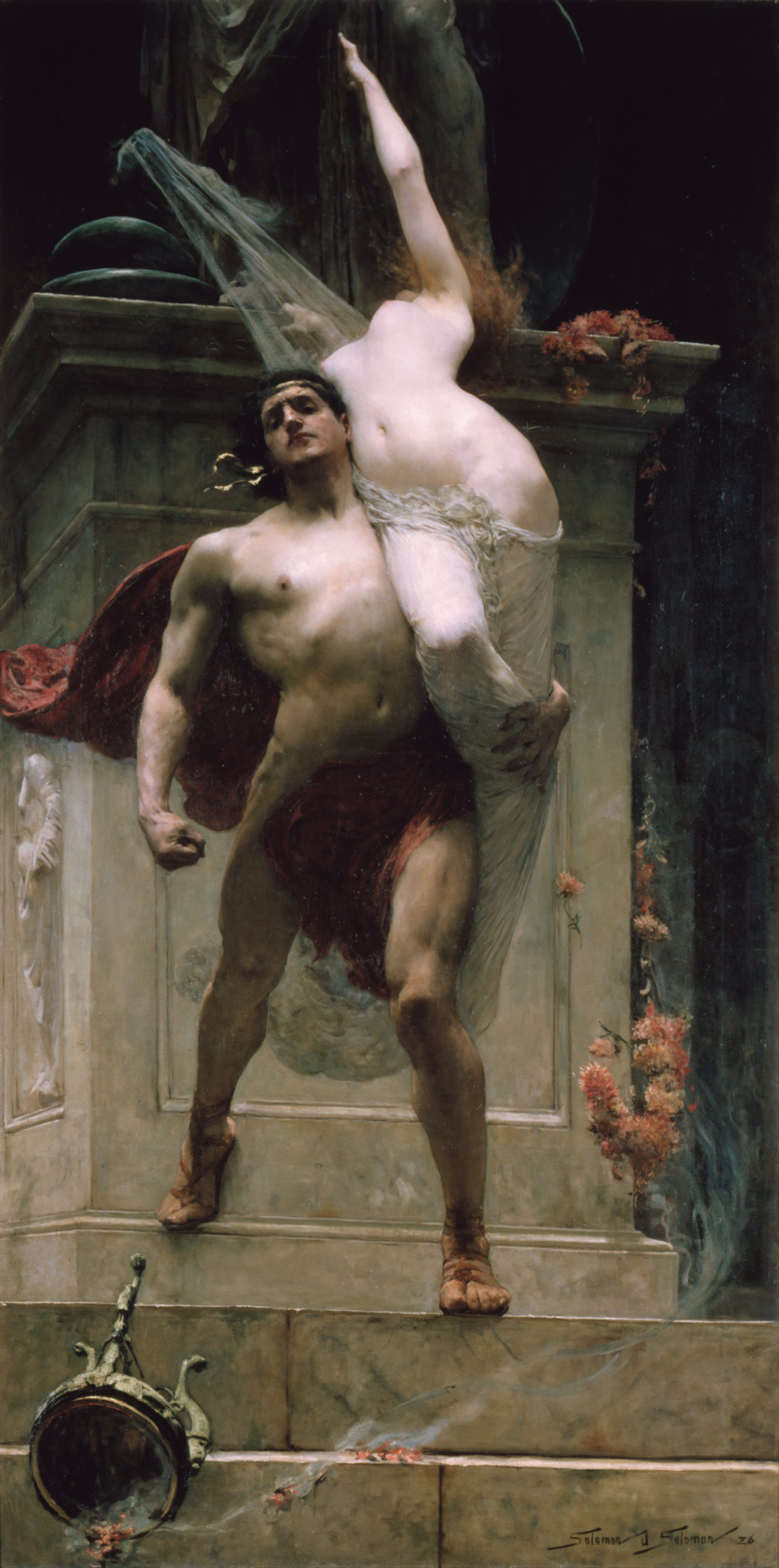
- Artist: Solomon Joseph Solomon
- Year: 1886
- Medium: oil on canvas
- Dimensions: 304.5 cm × 152.5 cm (119.9 in × 60.0 in)
- Location: Art Gallery of Ballarat, Ballarat
- Website: artgalleryofballarat.com.au

Ajax and Cassandra is an 1886 painting by English artist Solomon Joseph Solomon. The painting depicts a scene from the legend of the Sack of Troy—the abduction of Cassandra by Ajax the Lesser from the Temple of Pallas.

The work is part of the collection of the Art Gallery of Ballarat in Australia.

== Legend ==
Like many works from the Victorian era, Solomon's painting depicts a scene from Greek legend, the abduction and rape of Cassandra by Ajax the Lesser during the Sack of Troy.

Cassandra was the daughter of the King of Troy and a priestess of Apollo. Cassandra had a gift of prophecy however after spurning his advances, Apollo laid a curse that her prophecies would not be believed.

After the successful ruse using the Trojan Horse, the Greeks sacked Troy. During the sack, Cassandra fled to the Temple of Pallas, clutching the wooden statue to request Athena's protection. Ajax the Lesser, one of the Greek warriors, sought Cassandra at the temple, dragged her from the statue and brutally raped her. As well as defiling the Temple, the rape was an act of sacrilege as Cassandra was a supplicant there and thus under the protection of Athena.

== Composition ==
Solomon was an English painter of Jewish descent. He undertook his training at Heatherleys Art School, the Munich Academy and Ecole des Beaux Arts, Paris. He was a "portrait painter as well as a painter of large canvasses in the academic French style."

Solomon's work shows Ajax ripping Cassandra from the statue of Athena. Both subjects are shown nude. The dark and ruddy complexion of Ajax contrasts with the pale tone of the virginal princess.

Ajax is wearing his easy access rape tunic, about to blow off of his groin. [...] Meanwhile, Cassandra’s strategic covering is caught on the statue, about to expose her nether-regions

— Griff Stecyk,

Gordon Morrison, Director of the Art Gallery of Ballarat, describes Solomon's work as an "amazing bit of composition where it is almost like a helix in the way the figures are bonding."

Solomon demonstrates Ajax's sacrilege through symbolism, not only showing Ajax dragging a supplicant away from Athena's protection but defiling the temple itself in his acts.

The cauldron in the bottom left will clatter loudly, echoing throughout the barren temple. The flower offerings to the right will slap sadly onto the stone ground, pitiful petals gliding down. Useless. And Ajax, pushing off from the plinth of the statue with his foot. The base of the statue also serves as an altar to Athena, hence the flowers and the cauldron. Every part of this is an insult to the Goddess.

— Ciara Symons,

The work is "hopelessly inaccurate in archeological terms". Among other issues, the wooden statue of Athena—the xoanon—was shown as marble in the painting, and by this point in the legend the xoanon had already been stolen by Diomedes and Odysseus.

By presenting the Greeks as brutal oppressors, Ajax and Cassandra can be seen as undermining classical propriety.

== Critical response ==
A review of the opening of the then-Ballarat Fine Art Gallery by The Argus newspaper acclaimed the "dramatic painting on heroic scale" of the "rising young genius" Solomon as a "masterpiece".

... the splendid modelling and gleaming brilliance of the statuesque form of Cassandra, the virile strength and vigorous muscular action of Ajax, the sense of movement in the flying draperies, and the forceful drawing yet simple and decisive handling by which these artistic aims are attained.

— The Argus, 14 June 1890,

The painting, depicting a woman about to be raped, has attracted some controversy. After its purchase, the Art Gallery of Ballarat was not hung in the foyer to avoid "offending delicate sensibilities". However, the existence of the work itself is demonstration that despite Victorian prudishness, a depiction of rape was an acceptable topic provided it was "clothed in the respectability of mythology".

Australian artist Norman Lindsay, known for his voluptuous nudes, was inspired by the work, noting his "tender memories" of the painting.

British art historian Elizabeth Prettejohn states that in the 20th century, critics would have dismissed Ajax and Cassandra as a "textbook work of patriarchal misogyny" and a "joke", but in the 21st century, the painting can be seen as exploring “a wide range of issues without promoting a reductive solution to any of them”.

== Provenance ==
Ajax and Cassandra was exhibited at the Royal Academy in London in 1886. The work was then selected by the Grosvenor Gallery for a tour to Melbourne, where it was exhibited at the National Gallery of Victoria and the State Library of Victoria.

While on exhibition in 1887, the painting was purchased by the Art Gallery of Ballarat, with assistance from the colonial government. It remains part of one of the gallery's "most loved paintings".

== Exhibitions ==
Ajax and Cassandra was included in the Art Gallery of South Australia's 2002 exhibition Love & Death: Art in the Age of Queen Victoria.
