= Art Gallery of Ballarat =

Coordinates: 37.5605°S 143.8583°E

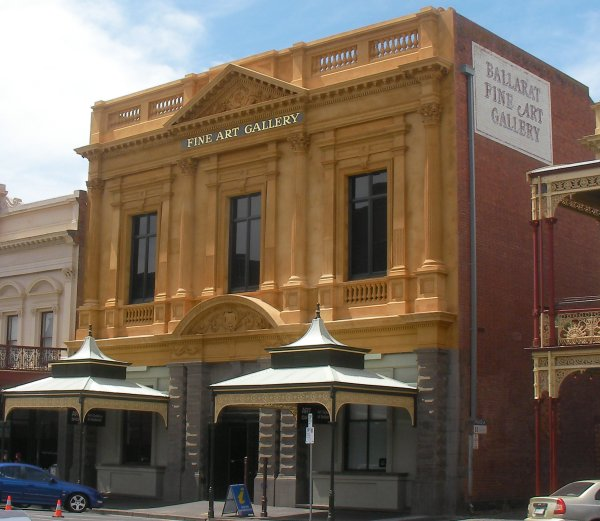
- Established: 1884
- Location: 40 Lydiard Street North. Ballarat, Australia
- Type: Art gallery
- Website: artgalleryofballarat.com.au

The Art Gallery of Ballarat is the oldest regional art gallery in Australia. It was established in 1884 as the Ballarat Fine Art Gallery by a company of interested citizens led by James Oddie. It initially rented out the first floor of the Ballarat Academy of Music; the current building on Lydiard Street North opened in 1890. The gallery was privately owned until financial insecurity led to the building and collection being handed over to the Ballarat City Council in 1977. In 2008, the gallery adopted its current name and became a free-entry venue. Louise Tegart is the gallery's current director.

The Art Gallery of Ballarat is a tourist attraction for Ballarat. Listed on the Victorian Heritage Register, its two-storey building is one of the city's most historically significant. The collection is composed of over 11,200 works from the eighteenth century to the present day. The gallery holds temporary exhibitions in addition to its main display rooms on the upper floor. Although the Eureka Flag has been part of the collection since 1895, it has since been on long-term loan to the Eureka Centre.

== Establishment ==
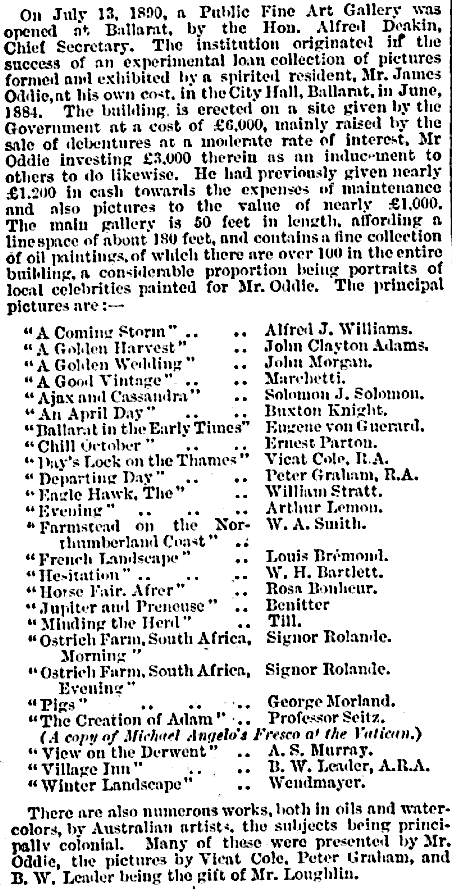
Opening of Ballarat Fine Art Gallery (1890).

In June 1884, the prominent Ballarat benefactor James Oddie (1824–1911) funded and lent paintings for a public exhibition at the city hall. Soon after, a group of interested citizens held a meeting and decided that a permanent art gallery should be established. Lacking their own building, they rented out the first floor of the Ballarat Academy of Music—where Her Majesty's Theatre now is—from Sir William Clarke. On 11 September 1884, Governor Henry Loch opened the gallery during his first visit to Ballarat. The collection was then mainly composed of loaned items; Oddie was the main benefactor and is considered the gallery's "patron and founder". J. A. Powell succeeded E. Turnbull as Secretary.

In August 1886, the State Government sanctioned £2000 to purchase pictures for the Gallery and granted them a site on Lydiard Street. It was designed by Tappin, Gilbert and Dennehy in the Renaissance Revival style as a bluestone brick and render facade and stone stairway. The foundation stone was laid by Sir William Clarke on 21 June 1887 to commemorate the Golden Jubilee of Queen Victoria. In May 1886, the Ballarat Fine Art Public Gallery Association was established.

The first stage of the new building was completed in 1890. The new building was opened by the local member, later Prime Minister, Alfred Deakin on Friday 13 June 1890.

At the 1905 annual meeting, a heated exchange ensured: gallery president Oddie accused Secretary J. A. Powell of "insubordination in connection" to the gallery's renovation and pawning its items to the government. Oddie threatened to remove all gallery items under his ownership. He only yielded when Prime Minister Deakin urged him in writing to reconsider.

== Theft ==
In the 1970s, the privately managed Ballarat Fine Art Gallery faced financial insecurity. Ron Radford, who served as gallery director from 1973 to 1980, advocated to improve its collection and security. Back then, the gallery employed only Radford, an administrative assistant and a cleaner. In 1978, the gallery was in a large amount of debt; it had begun transferring the building and the collection to the city council the year before. In return, the council covered the gallery's operating costs. Recognizing the security risk, the council had employed two more staff within the year.

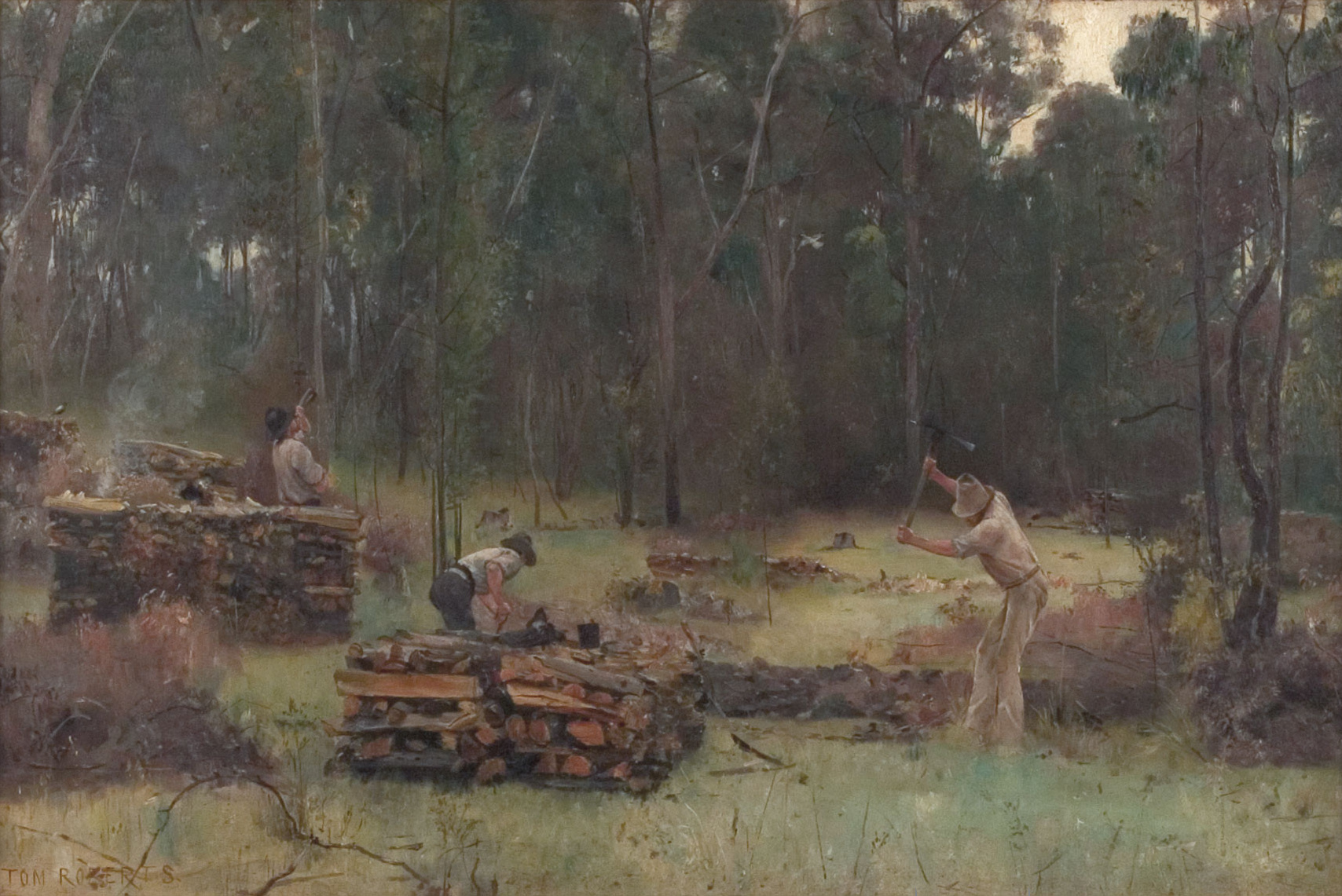
Charcoal burners by Tom Roberts, 1886

In August 1978, an unknown thief walked into the gallery and used a knife to cut the canvas of Tom Roberts' Charcoal burners (1886) from its frame, before rolling it up and walking out. The painting was reportedly worth over $400,000, and the theft received widespread media attention. Gordon Morrison, a later director, described the incident as a "national scandal". According to a member of the Gallery Association Council at the time, Radford received a ransom message several months later and the painting was retrieved from a park in Sydney after it was paid. Charcoal burners was returned to the gallery in May 1979. The incident played an important role in the improvement of security in regional galleries.

== Renaming ==
In 2008, the gallery was renamed the Art Gallery of Ballarat. It also became a free-entry venue and got a new logo.

== Architecture ==
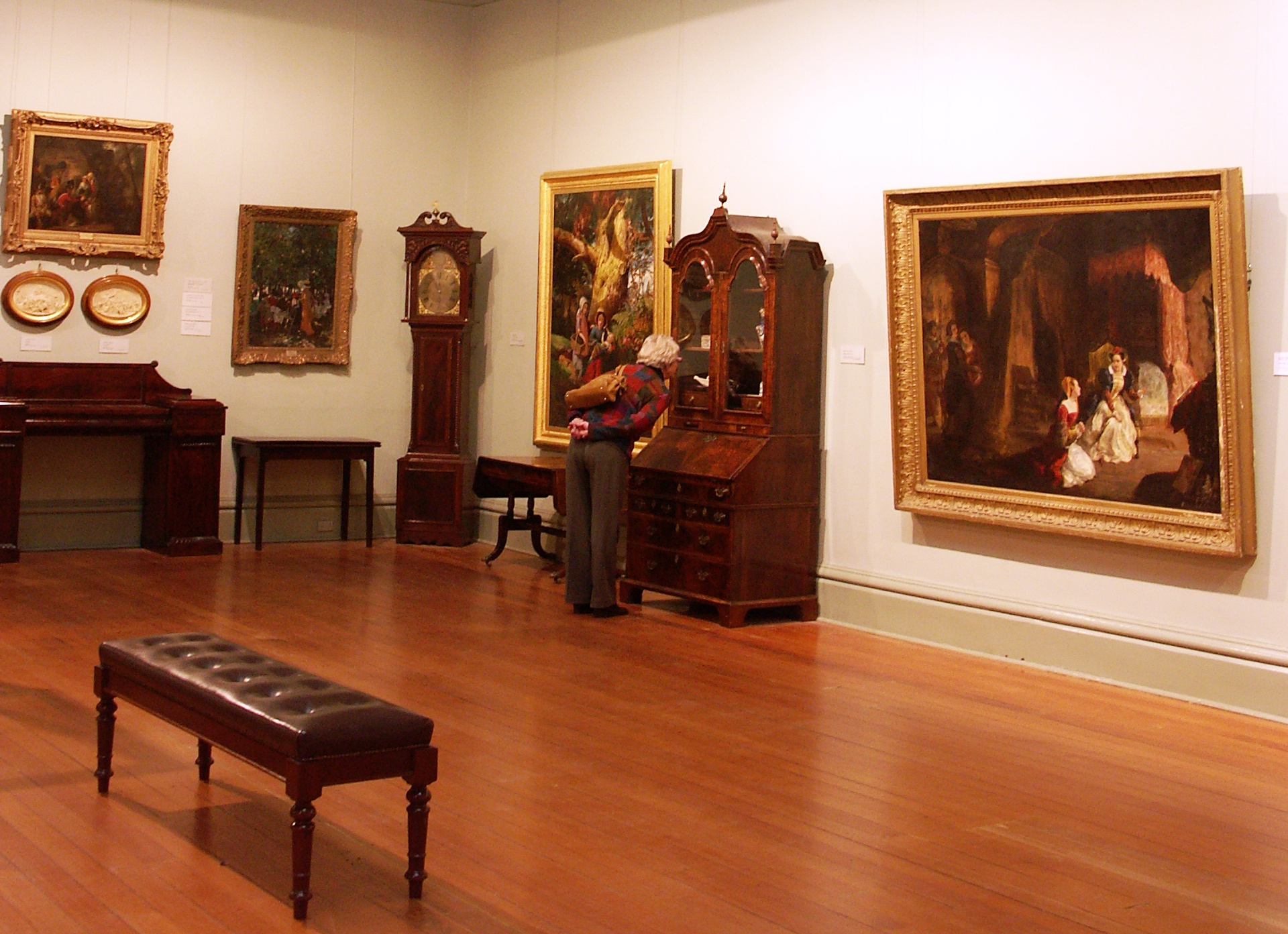
Gallery interior in 2007

The Art Gallery of Ballarat is located on 40 Lydiard Street North. Listed on the Victorian Heritage Register, the gallery is a double-storey building constructed in the Renaissance Revival architectural style. It features rusticated bluestone pilasters and twin pyramidal pavilions which extend to the ground level. Inside, a large stone stairway with Art Nouveau ceiling decoration leads up to the main gallery rooms.

Designed by the architectural firm Tappin, Gilbert and Dennehy and constructed between 1887–1890, it is the oldest purpose-built art gallery building in Australia. Three extensions were built in the 1927, 1987 and 2001, respectively. A restoration and renovation project in 2009 extended the exhibition hall, relocated the shop and cafe, and restored the facade. The $1.85 million of funding needed was shared by the state government and council. Another restoration took place in 2022.

== Collection ==
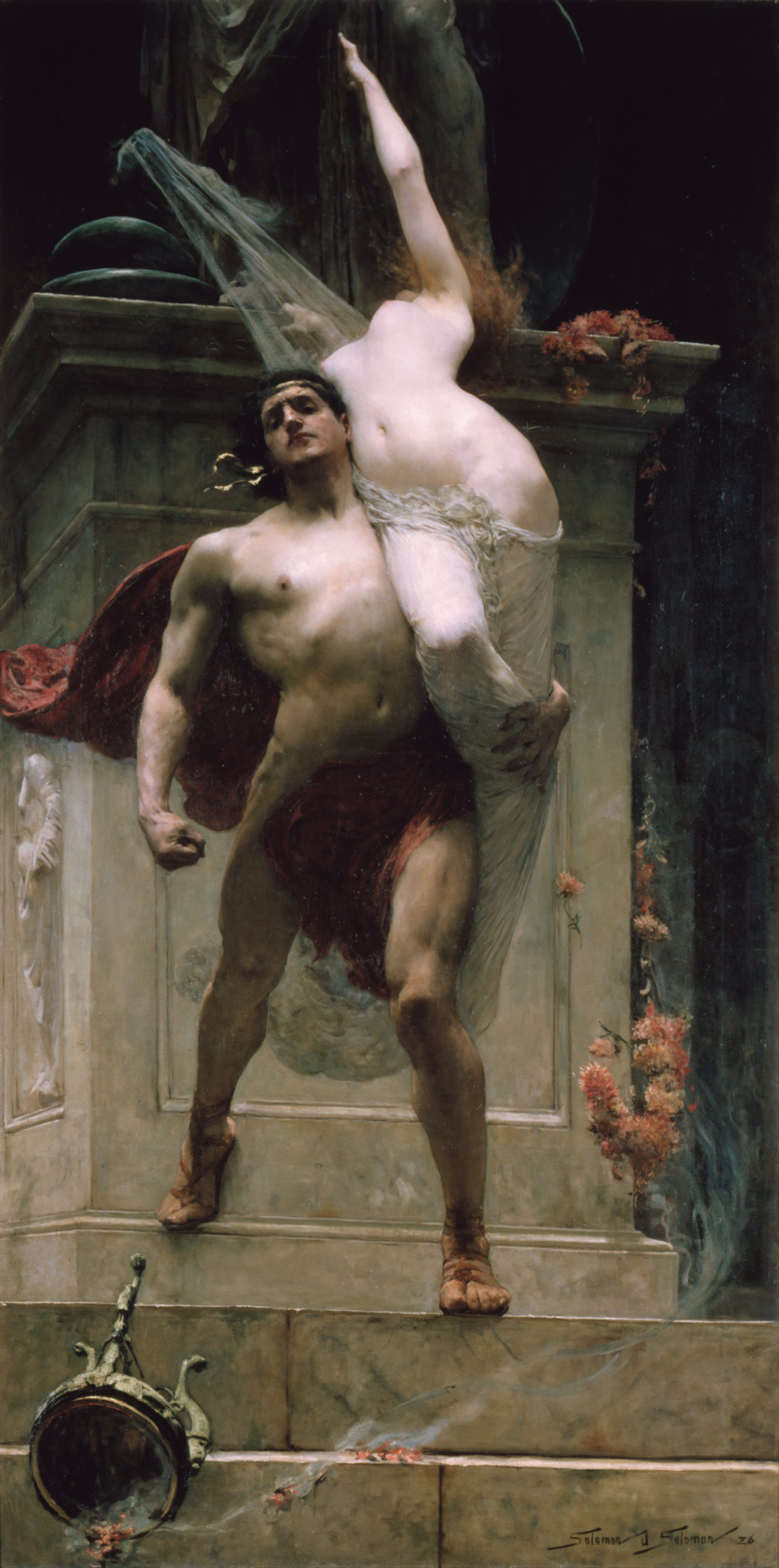
Solomon Joseph Solomon's Ajax and Cassandra (1886)

Several Australian publications have named the Art Gallery of Ballarat one of the best regional art galleries in Victoria. In November 2022, the collection comprised over 11,200 works. Director Gordon Morrison estimated in 2017 the collection included over two thousand paintings and six thousand prints and drawings. It was the largest regional gallery in Australia until the Gold Coast's HOTA Gallery overtook it when it opened in May 2021.

With a focus on the history of Australian art, the collection spans works from the eighteenth century to the present. It includes colonial and regional art. Items such as Old Ballarat as it was in the summer of 1853-54 (1884), for which the gallery commissioned artist Eugene von Guerard, depict the city's development. The gallery has been acquiring contemporary art since the 1960s. Unusually for a regional gallery, it has been acquiring Indigenous Australian art since the 1930s, particularly from the Northern Territory's Top End, which it includes as part of its contemporary collection.

A journalist for The Argus reviewed the paintings when the gallery opened in 1890. Solomon Joseph Solomon's Ajax and Cassandra (1886) was acquired by the gallery in 1887 after being exhibited at the Royal Academy of Arts and then on tour in Melbourne; The Argus hailed it as a "masterpiece". Although such a piece would typically be obtained by a state gallery, the newly founded Ballarat gallery quickly bought it and it became one of its "most loved paintings". The Argus also spoke favorably of the variety of landscape paintings which Oddie had acquired. Oddie had also contacted the widow of John King, the constable who kept the Eureka Flag after the Eureka Rebellion, to obtain it for the collection. While the flag is still under the gallery's custodianship, it has been loaned to the Museum of Australian Democracy at Eureka and then to the Eureka Centre since 2014.

During the late nineteenth century, the Gallery collection influenced the Lindsay family of artists and writers. In his youth, artist Norman Lindsay would study Ajax and Cassandra—the painting which The Australian credited with Lindsay's "penchant for voluptuous nudes"—and in the 1950s he donated some of his work to the gallery.

== See also ==
- W. D. Hill, mayor and longtime secretary of the South Street Society, whose portrait by Thomas Price was a foundation exhibit.

== Gallery ==
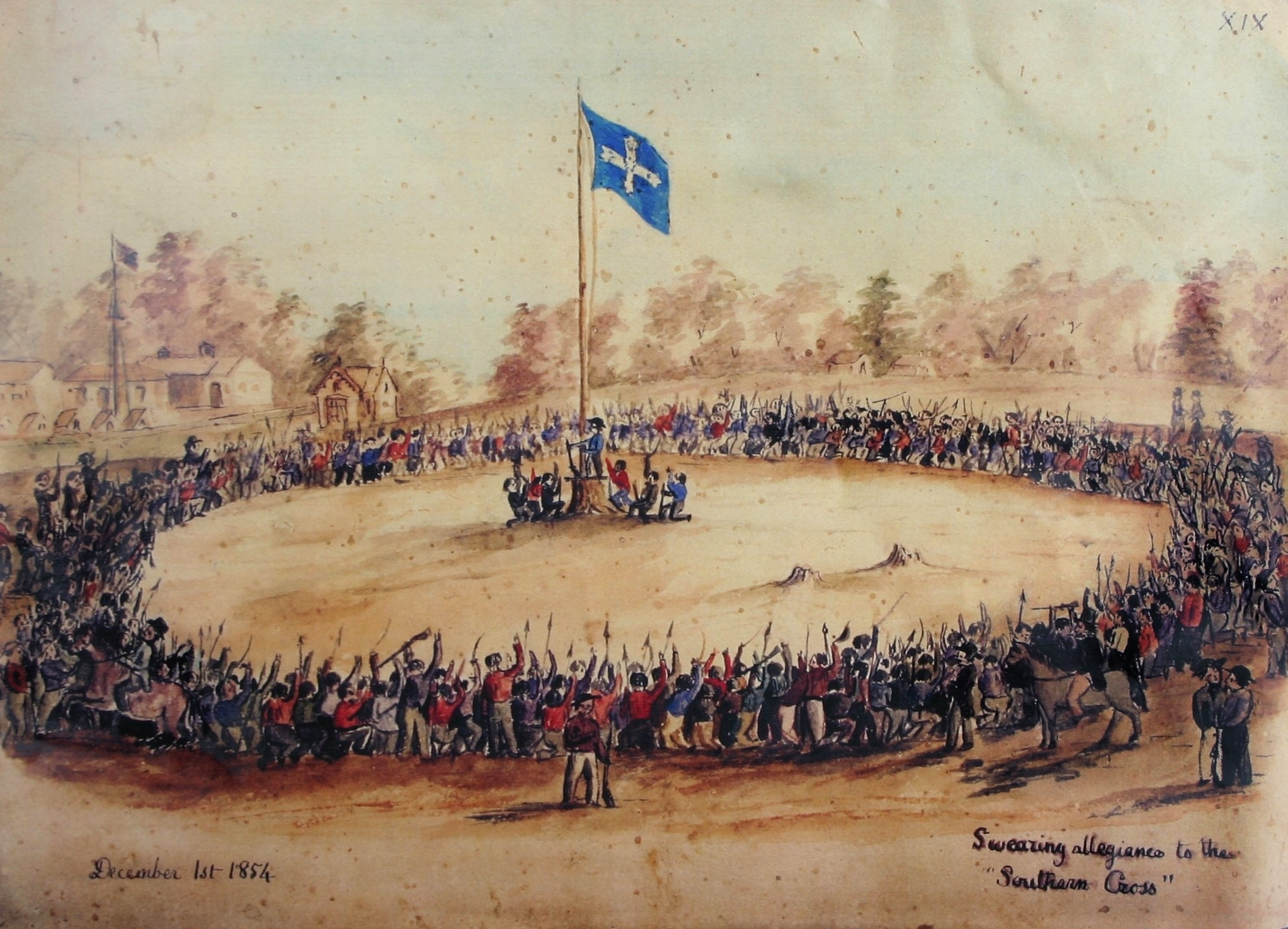
Charles Doudiet, Swearing Allegiance to the Southern Cross, 1854

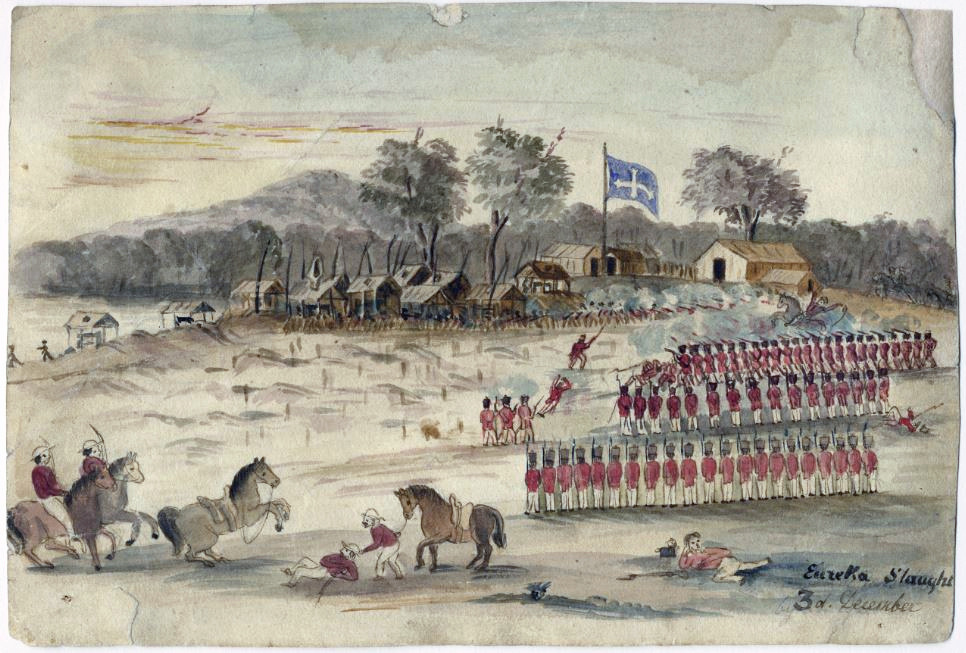
Charles Doudiet, Eureka Slaughter, 1854

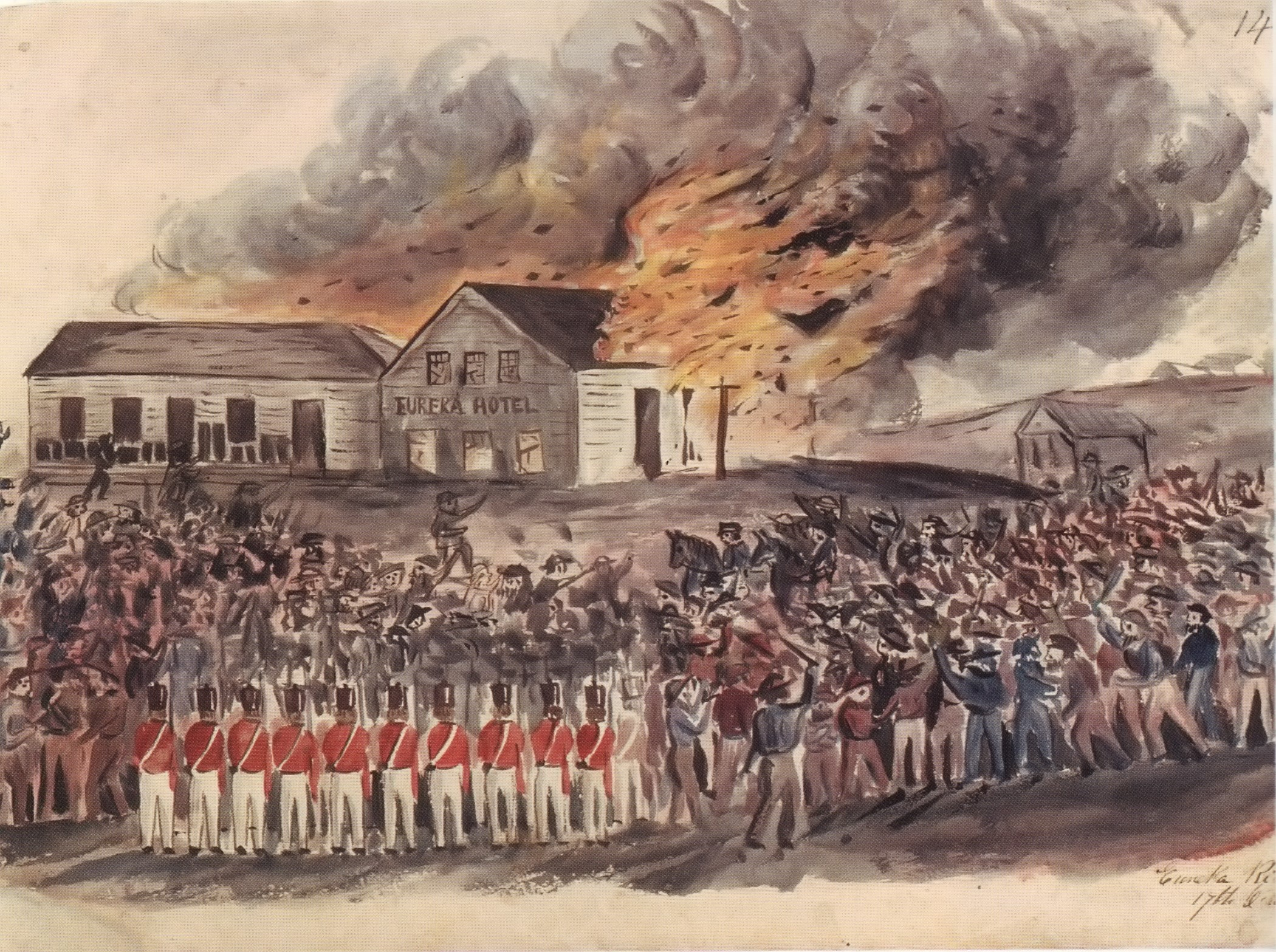
Charles Doudiet, Eureka Riot 17th October, 1854

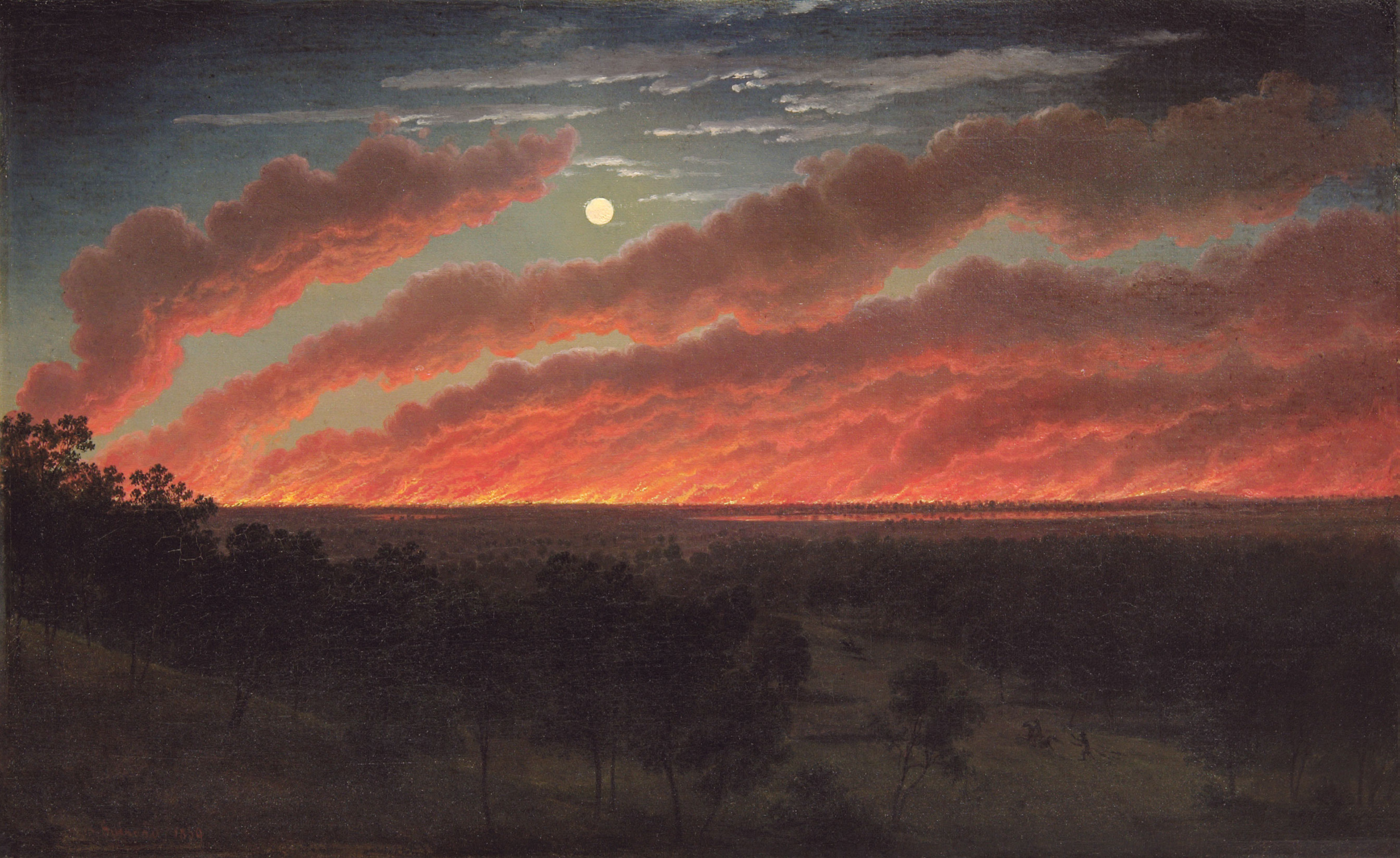
Eugene von Guerard, Bush fire between Mount Elephant and Timboon, 1857

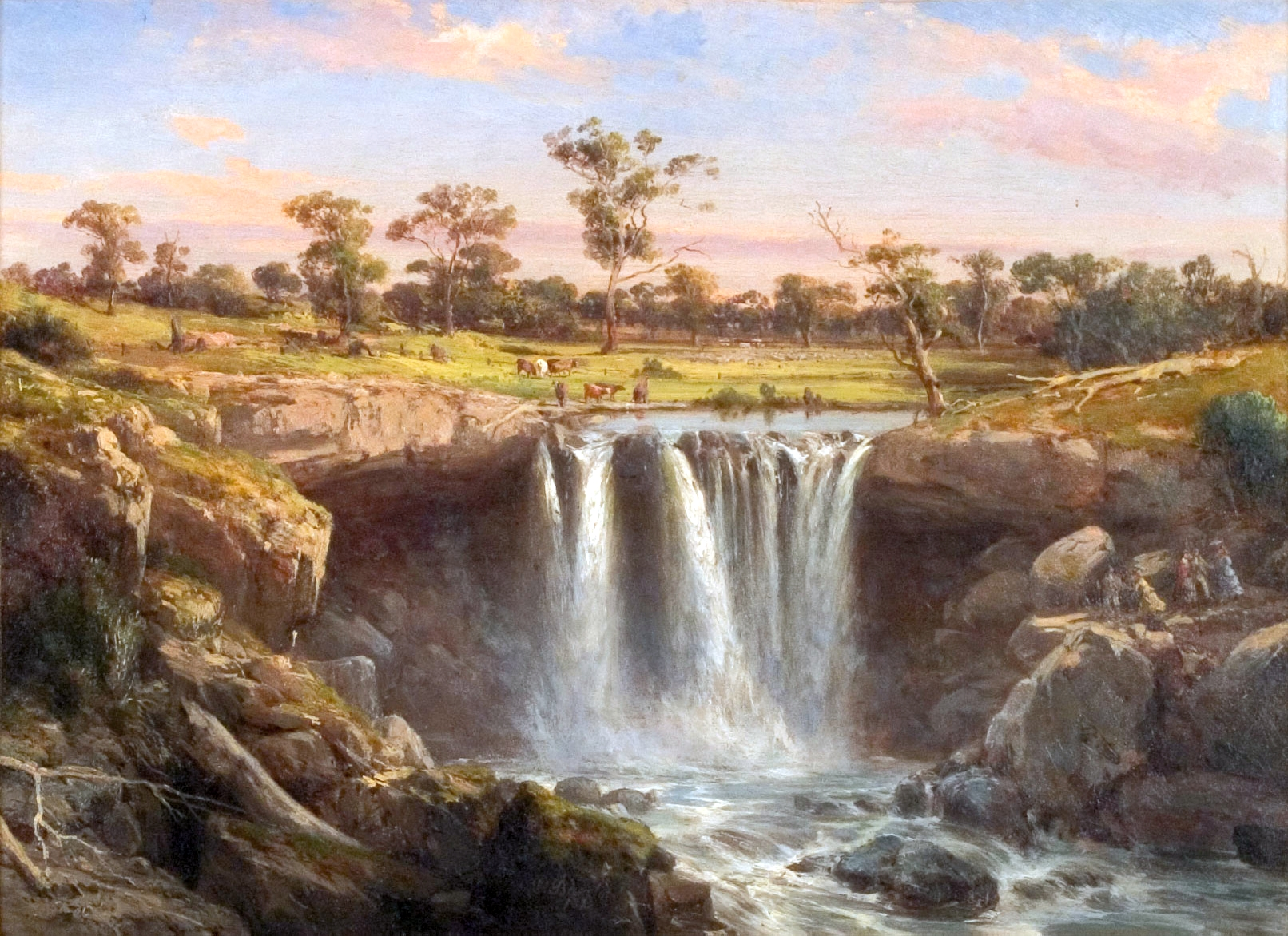
Louis Buvelot, One of the Falls of the Wannon, 1872

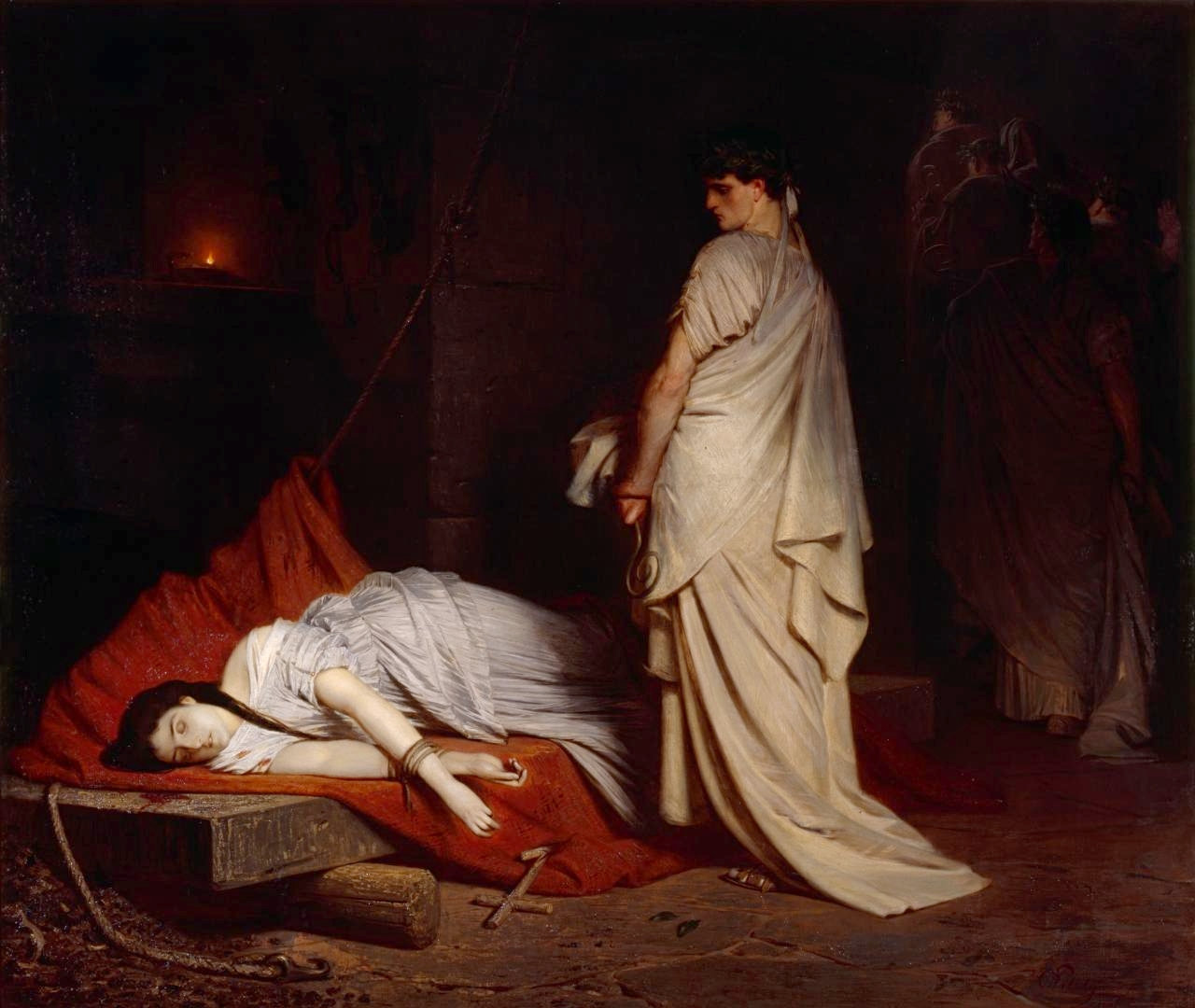
Karl von Piloty, Beneath the arena, 1882

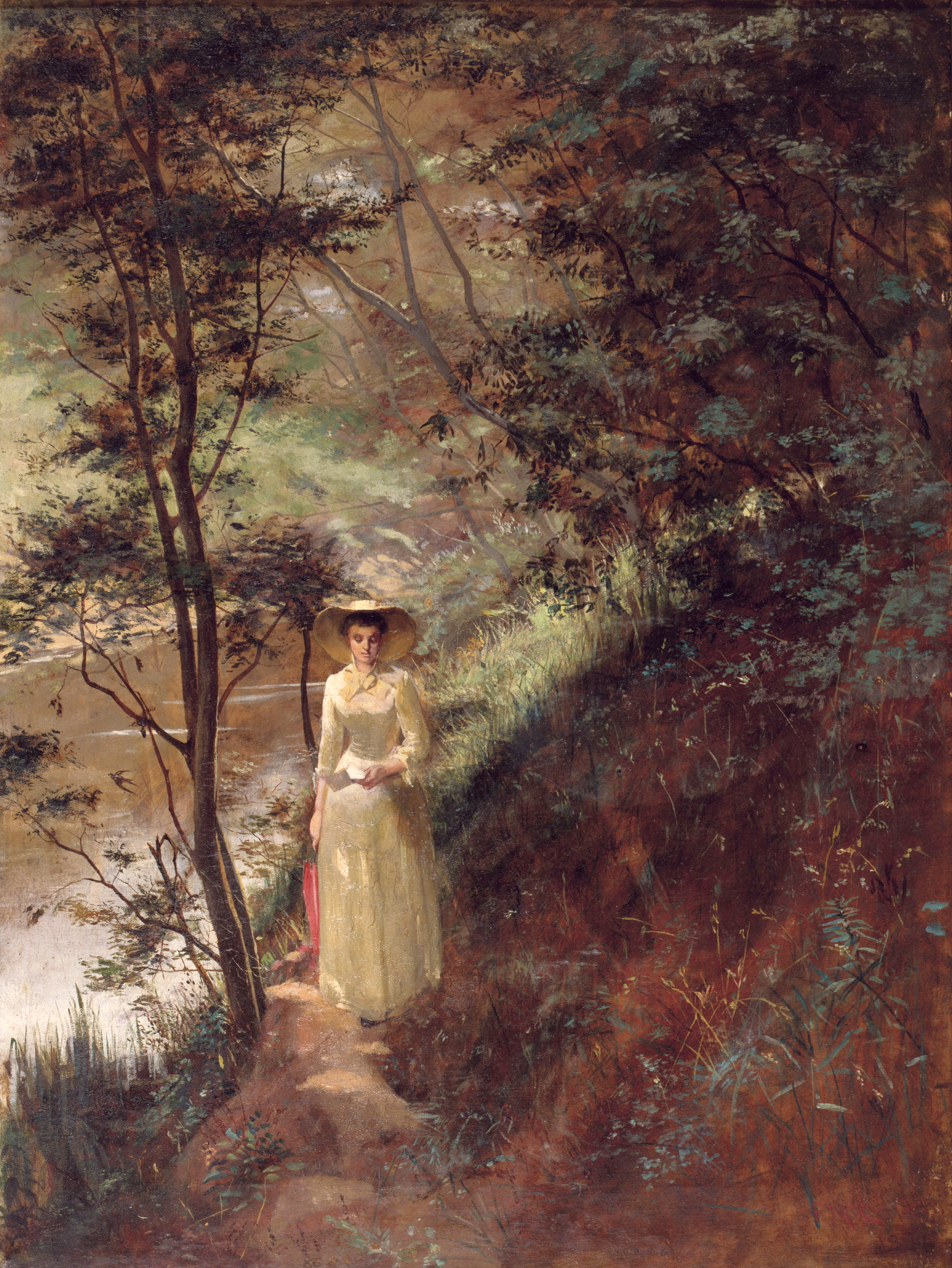
Frederick McCubbin, The Letter, 1884

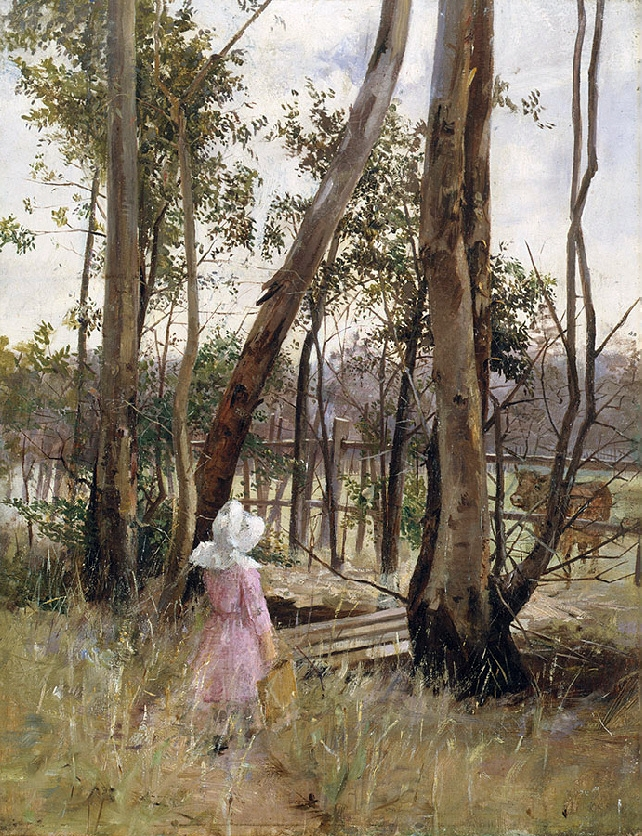
Jane Sutherland, Obstruction, 1887

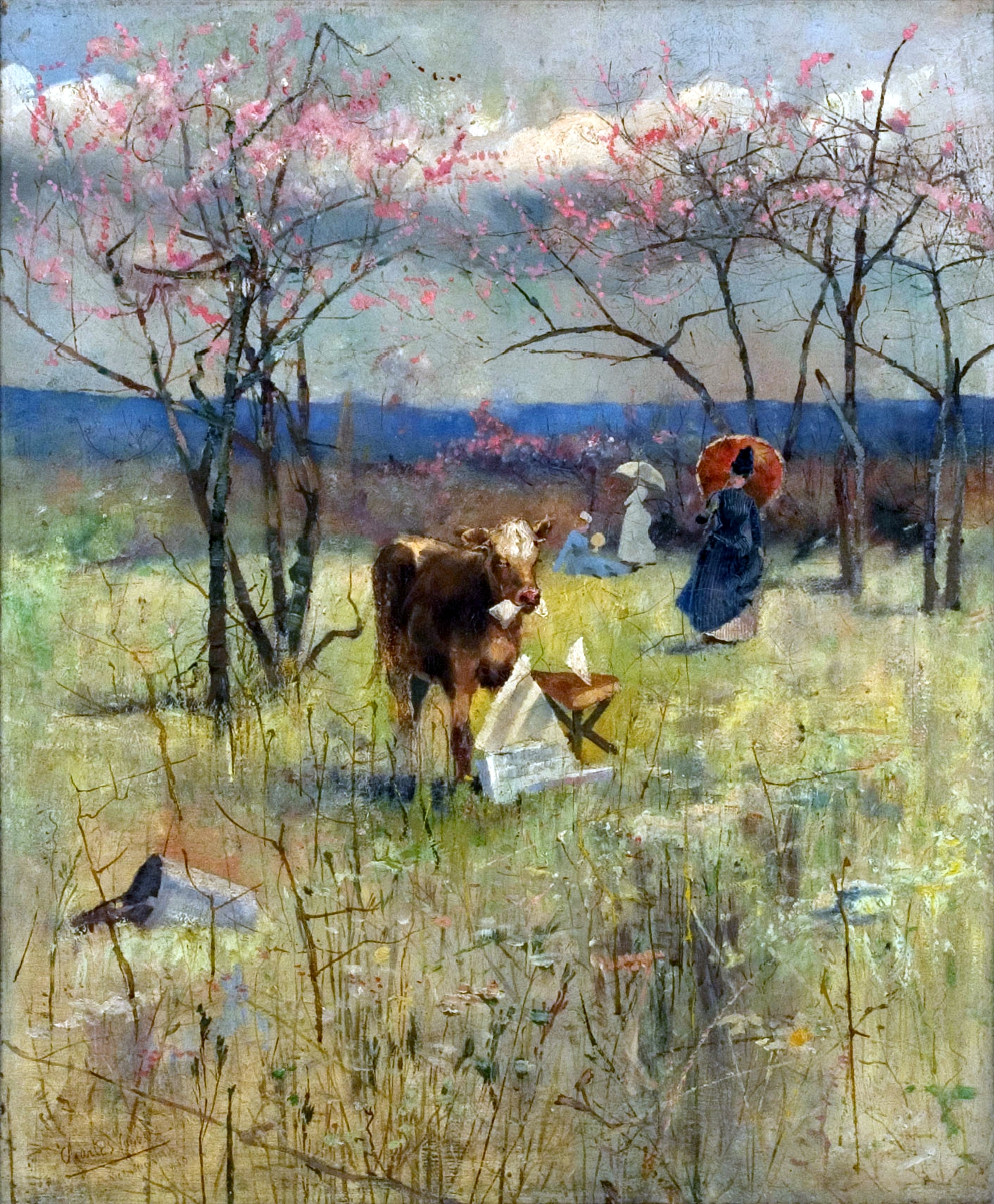
Charles Conder, An Early Taste for Literature, 1888

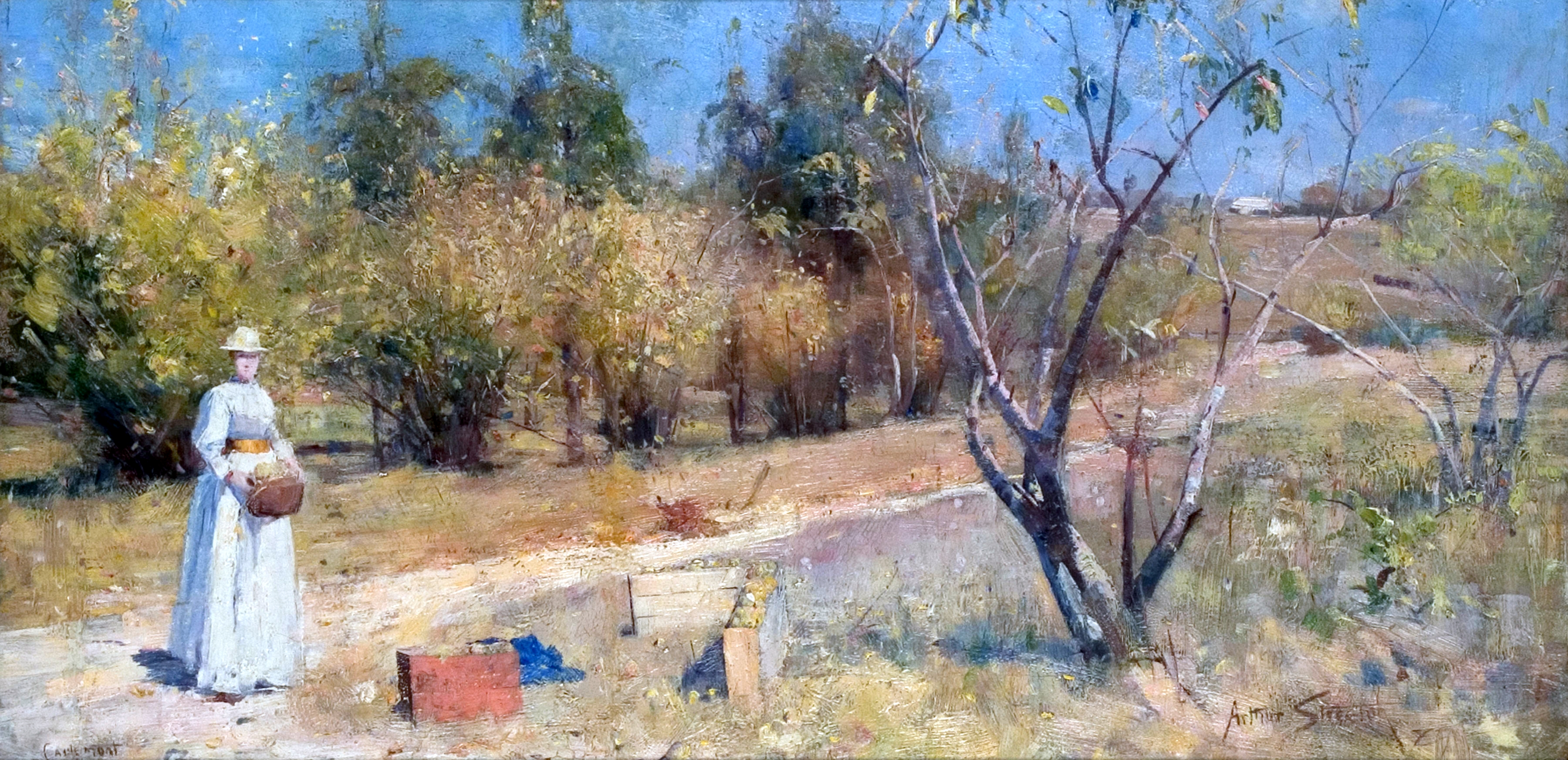
Arthur Streeton, Autumn (also known as Eaglemont), 1889

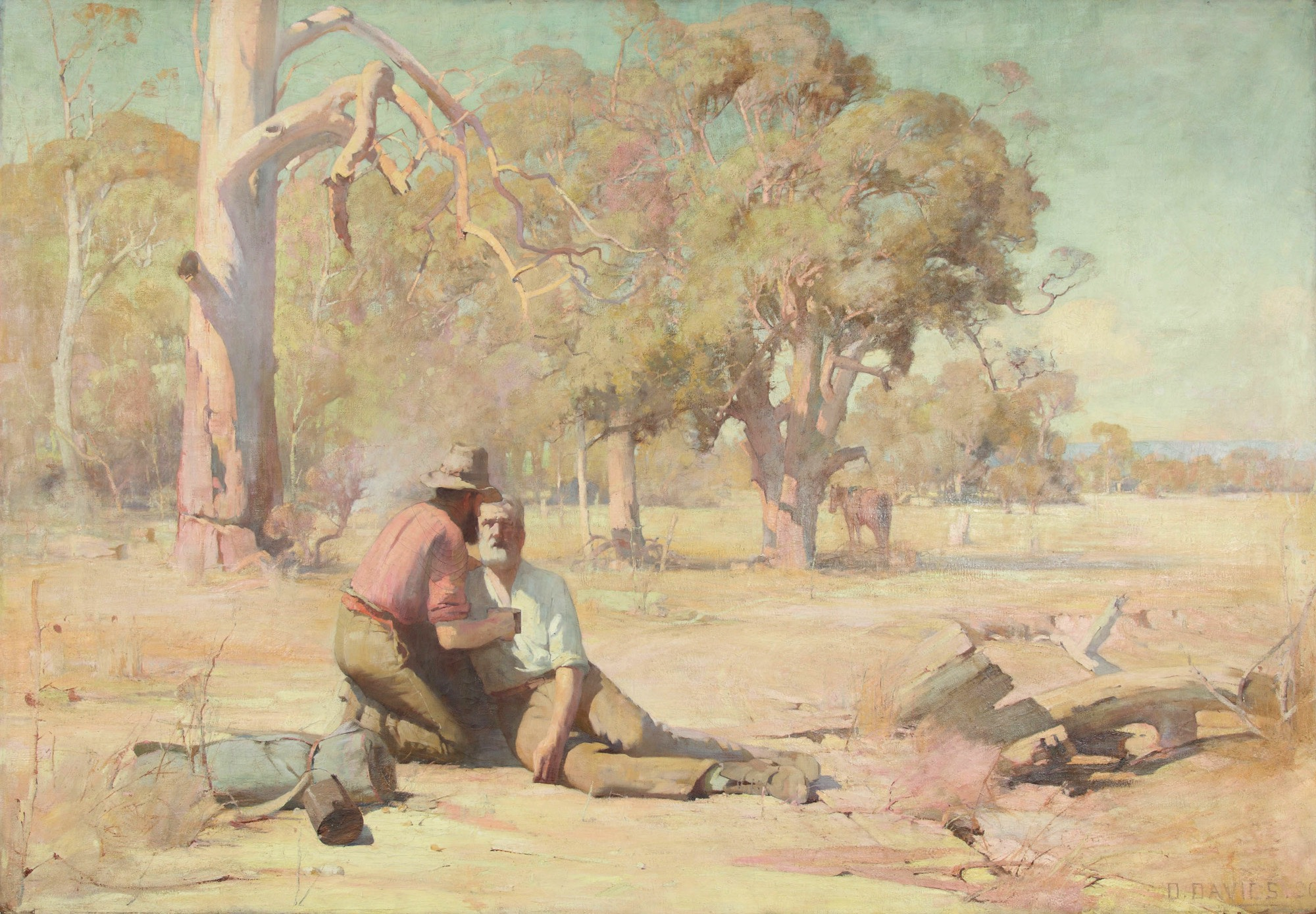
David Davies, Under the Burden and Heat of the Day, 1890

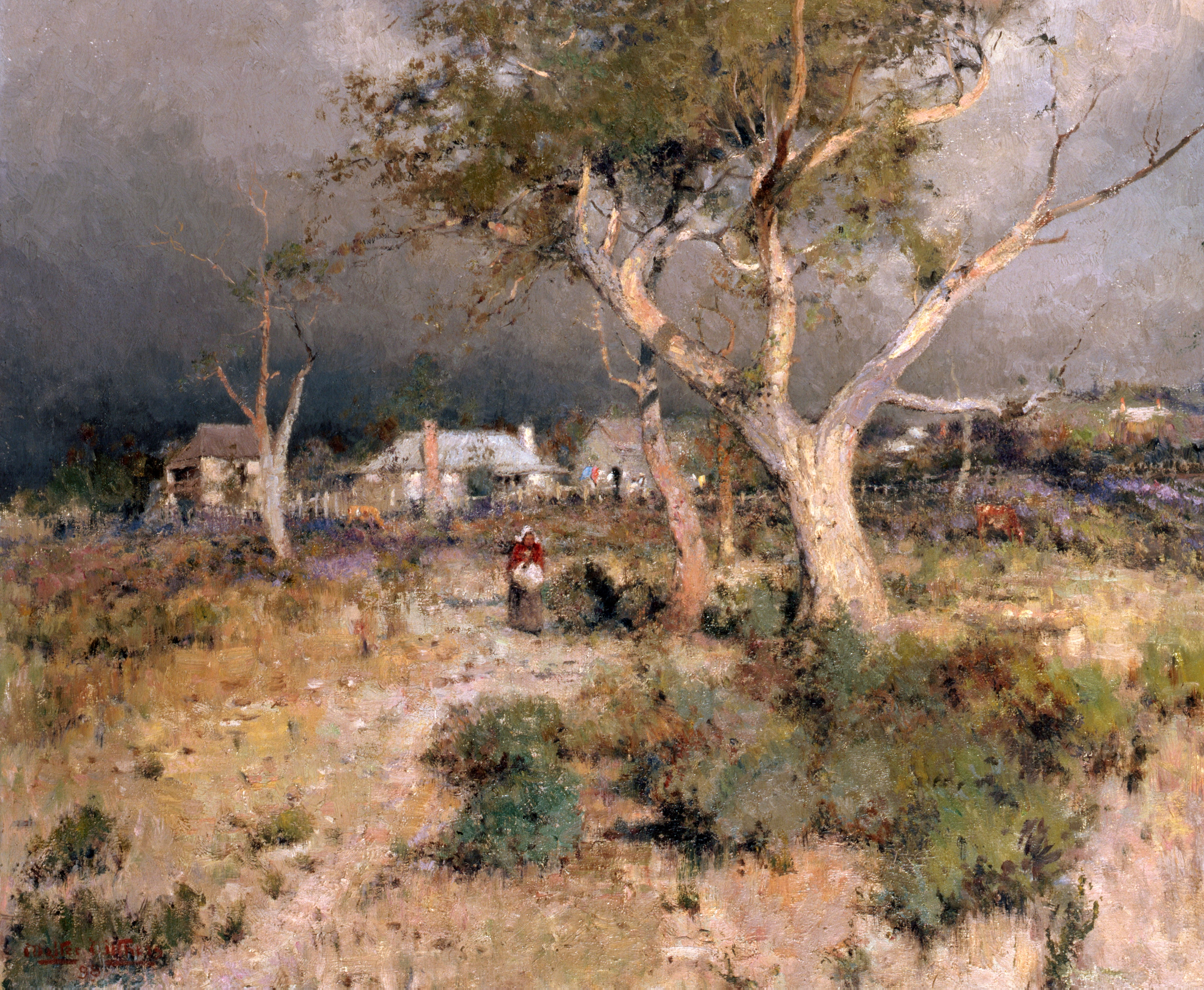
Walter Withers, The Last of Summer (also known as The Rising Storm), 1898

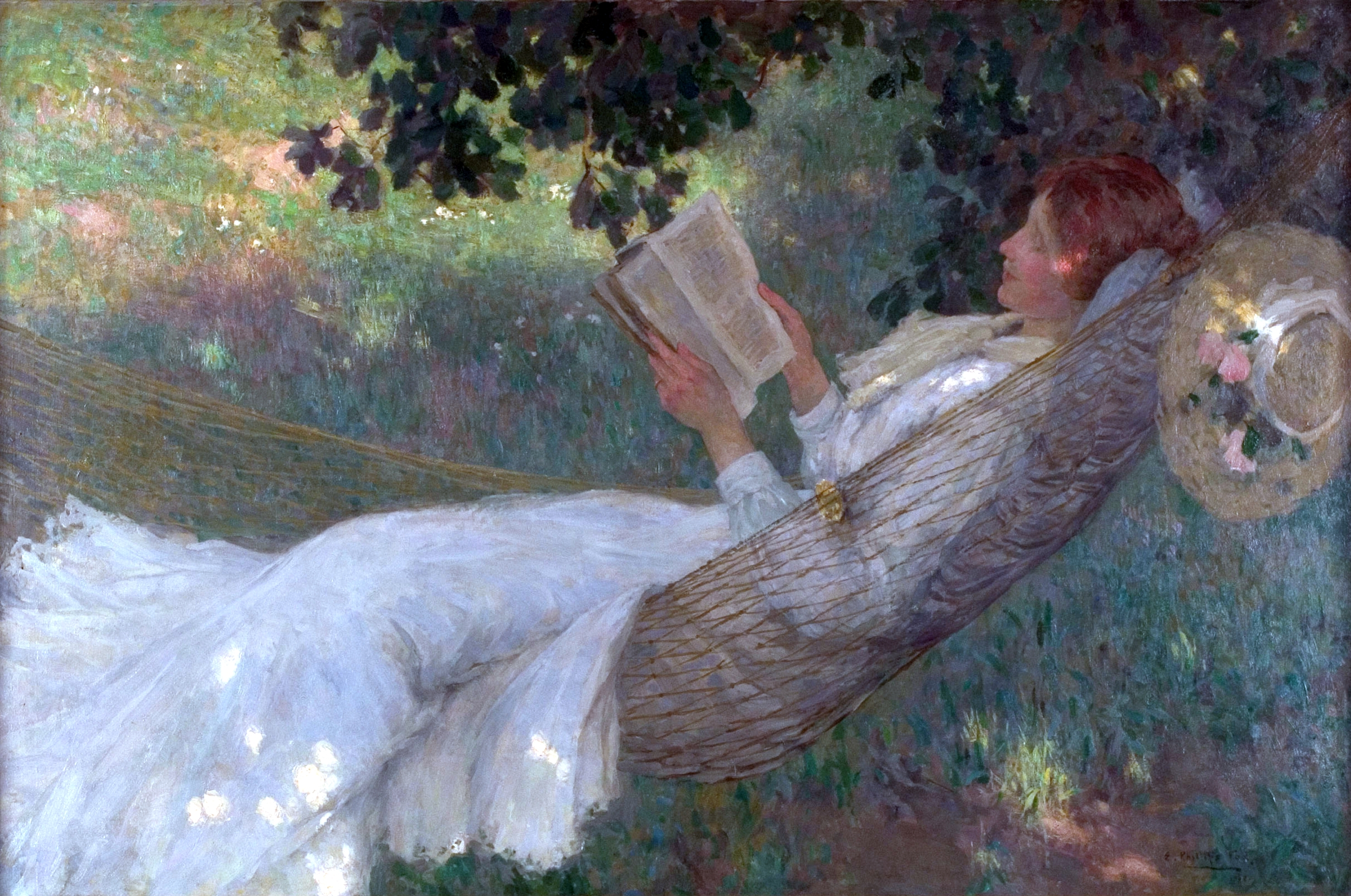
E. Phillips Fox, A Love Story, 1903

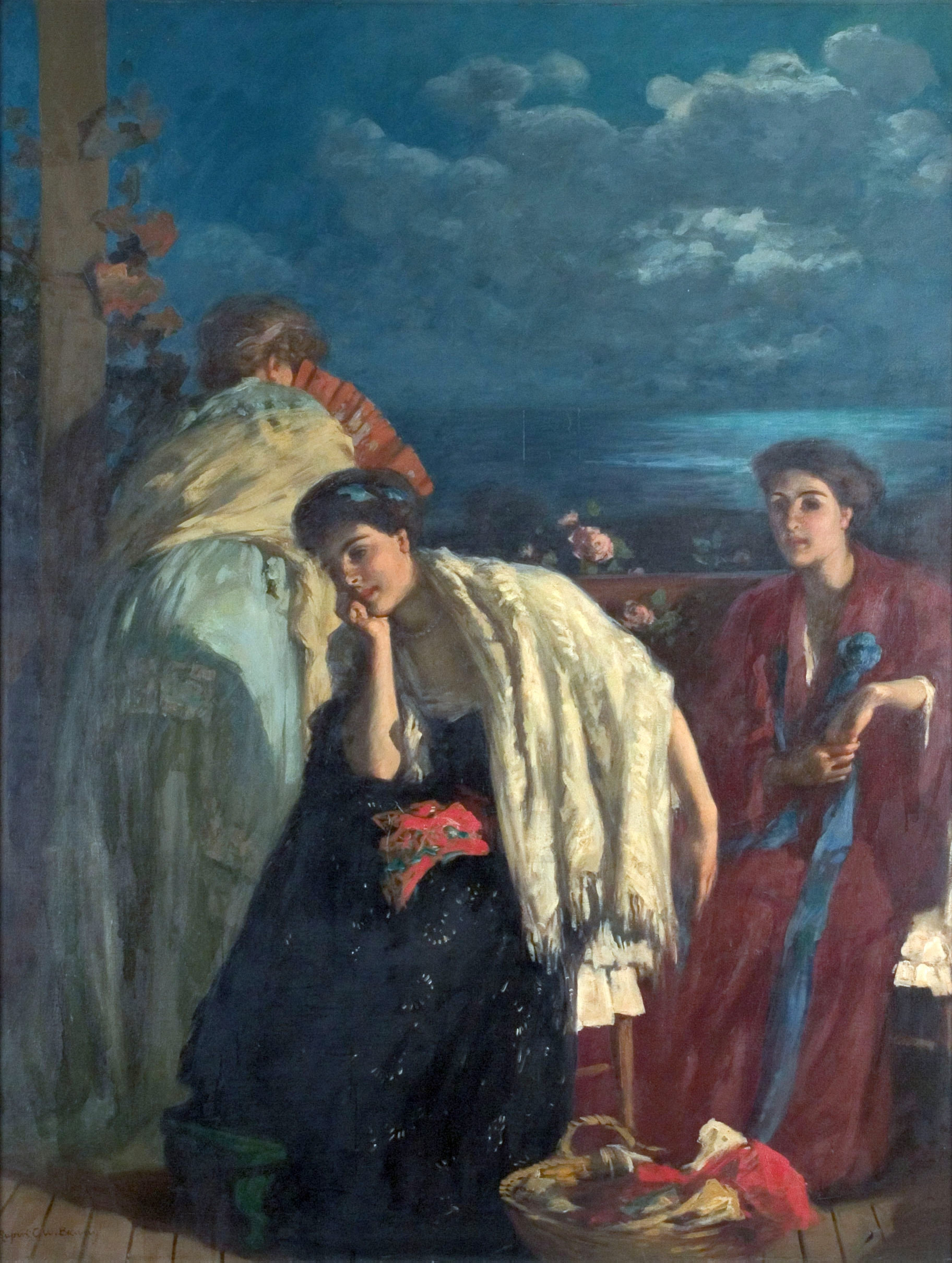
Rupert Bunny, The Sonata, 1909

Charles Wheeler, Portrait of Robert Menzies, 1946
