= Solomon Joseph Solomon =

English painter (1860–1927)

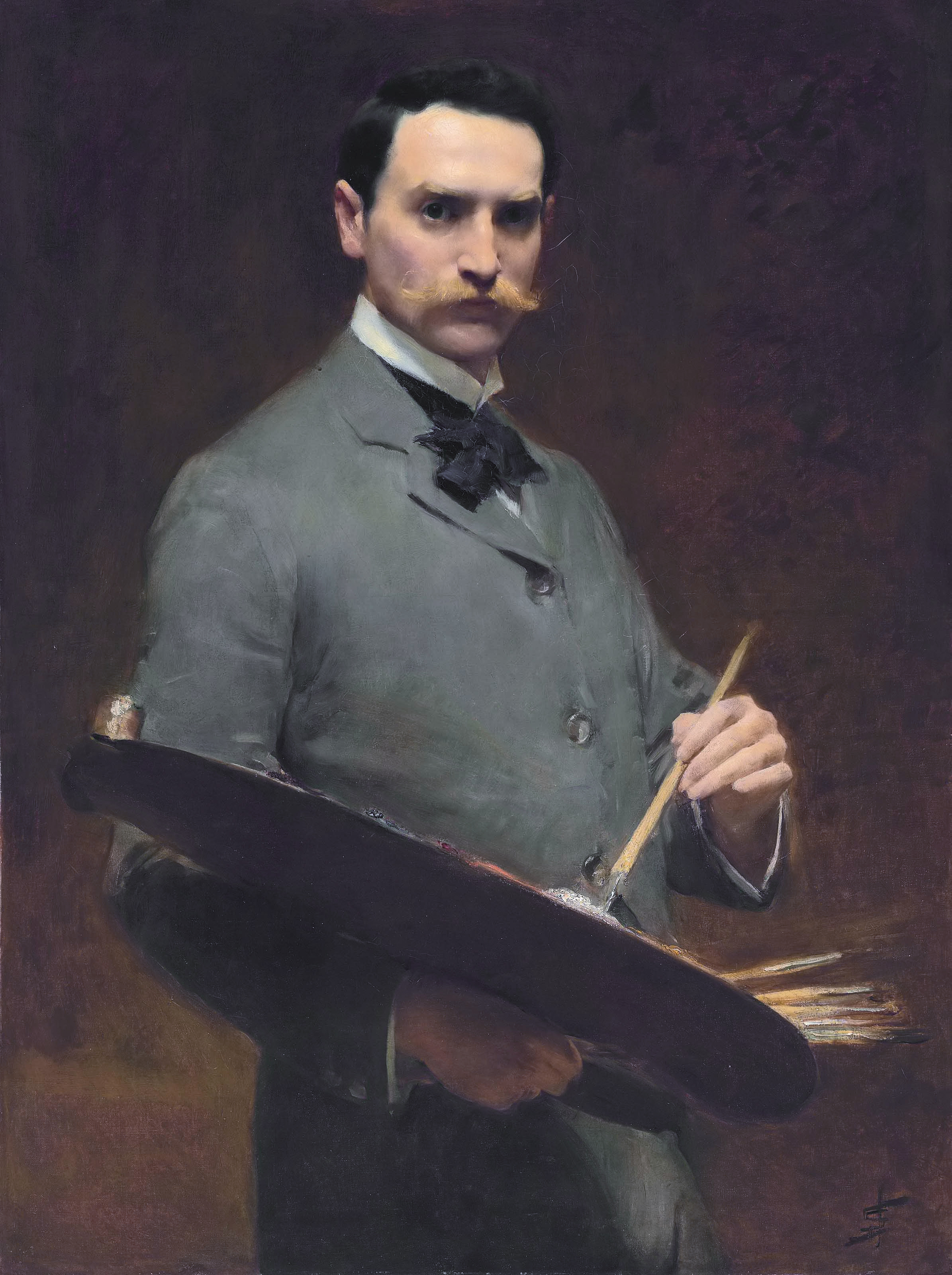
- Self-portrait, c. 1896
- Born: 16 September 1860; London, England
- Died: 27 July 1927 (aged 66); Birchington-on-Sea, Kent, England
- Known for: Portrait painting
- Notable work: Psyche
- Elected: Royal Academy; President, Royal Society of British Artists

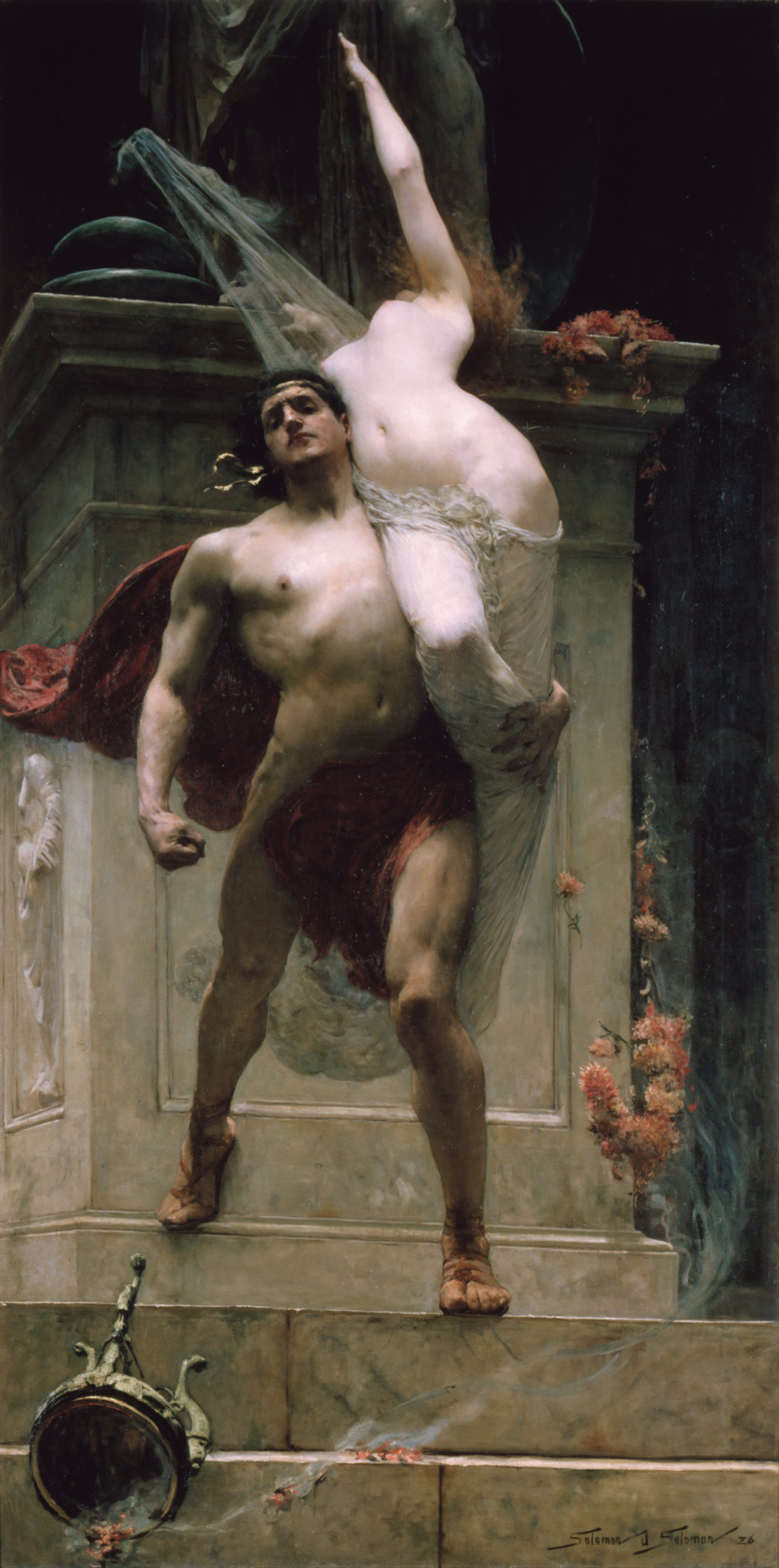
Ajax and Cassandra (1886). In the collection of the Art Gallery of Ballarat in Victoria, Australia

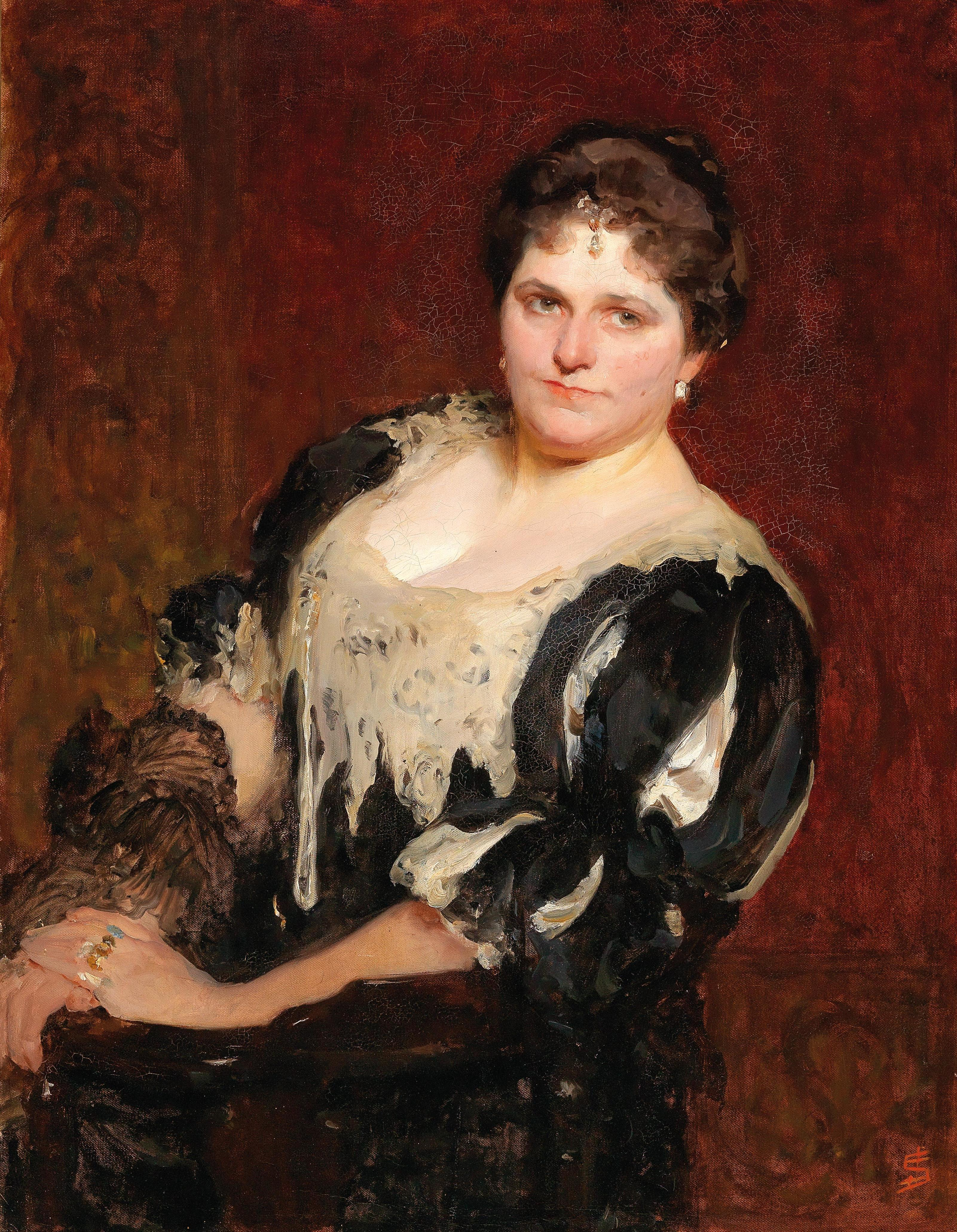
Portrait of French mezzo-soprano Blanche Marchesi

Solomon Joseph Solomon RA RBA (16 September 1860 – 27 July 1927) was a British painter, a founding member of the New English Art Club and member of the Royal Academy.

Solomon's family was Jewish, and his sister, Lily Delissa Joseph (née Solomon), was also a painter. He made an important contribution to the development of camouflage in the First World War, working in particular on tree observation posts and arguing tirelessly for camouflage netting.

== Biography ==
Born in London in 1860, Solomon studied at various art schools, sequentially, Heatherley School of Fine Art, the Royal Academy Schools, the Munich Academy, and École des Beaux-Arts (under Alexandre Cabanel). Solomon also studied separately under Rev. S. Singer. He exhibited his first works as early as 1881, and showed at the Royal Academy, the New Gallery, and the Society of British Artists. In 1886, he became one of the founding members of the New English Art Club. In 1896, he became an associate of the Royal Academy, with full membership following in 1906, one of the few Jewish painters to do so. He joined, and became president of, the Society of British Artists in 1919. In 1921 "Col. S.J. Solomon, R.A., P.R.B.A." was listed as one of the early members of the newly formed Society of Graphic Art.

Solomon died on 27 July 1927, he is buried at Willesden United Synagogue Cemetery in London.

== Art ==
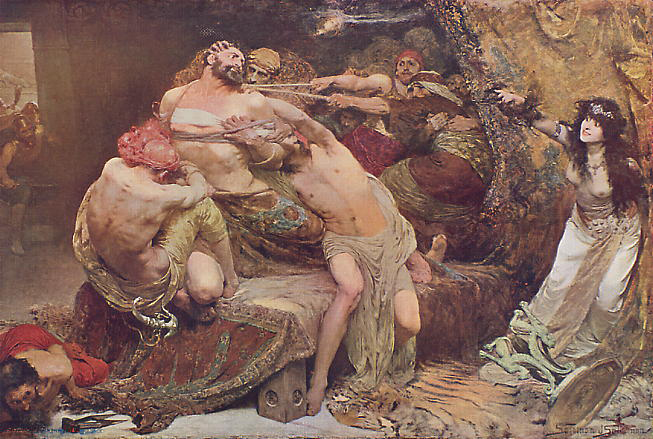
Samson (1887) which is on display at the Walker Art Gallery, Liverpool.

Solomon's painting was grounded in his influence from his teacher Alexandre Cabanel, but was also influenced by Frederic Leighton and Lawrence Alma-Tadema. Solomon painted mainly portraits to earn a living, but also painted dramatic, theatrical scenes from mythology and the bible on large canvasses. These scenes include some of his more popular paintings. In 1897 he painted a mural for the Royal Exchange, London Charles I demanding the Five Members at the Guildhall, 1641–42. One of Solomon's most popular works was Samson (1887), depicting a scene from the biblical story of Samson and Delilah. This painting was praised for its use of multiple male nudes in active poses. Samson is one of few Solomon paintings on regular display, at the Walker Art Gallery in Liverpool. Some other Solomon paintings that have received significant attention include Ajax and Cassandra (1886) and The Birth of Love (1896).

Solomon became well known as an innovative portrait artist by the time he painted Mrs Patrick Campbell as 'Paula Tanqueray' ARA (1894), her role in Arthur Wing Pinero's The Second Mrs Tanqueray, and went on to paint a number of portraits of well-known people, including the architect Sir Aston Webb and for the Art Workers' Guild their Master Thomas Graham Jackson. Later in life he received royal commissions to paint King George V, Queen Mary, and Prince Edward (later King Edward VIII). Solomon was also in demand as a book illustrator, particularly adventure books. In 1914, Solomon authored The Practice of Oil Painting and Drawing. In 1942 his painting Psyche was stolen from Robert McDougall Art Gallery in Christchurch, New Zealand.

== Camouflage ==
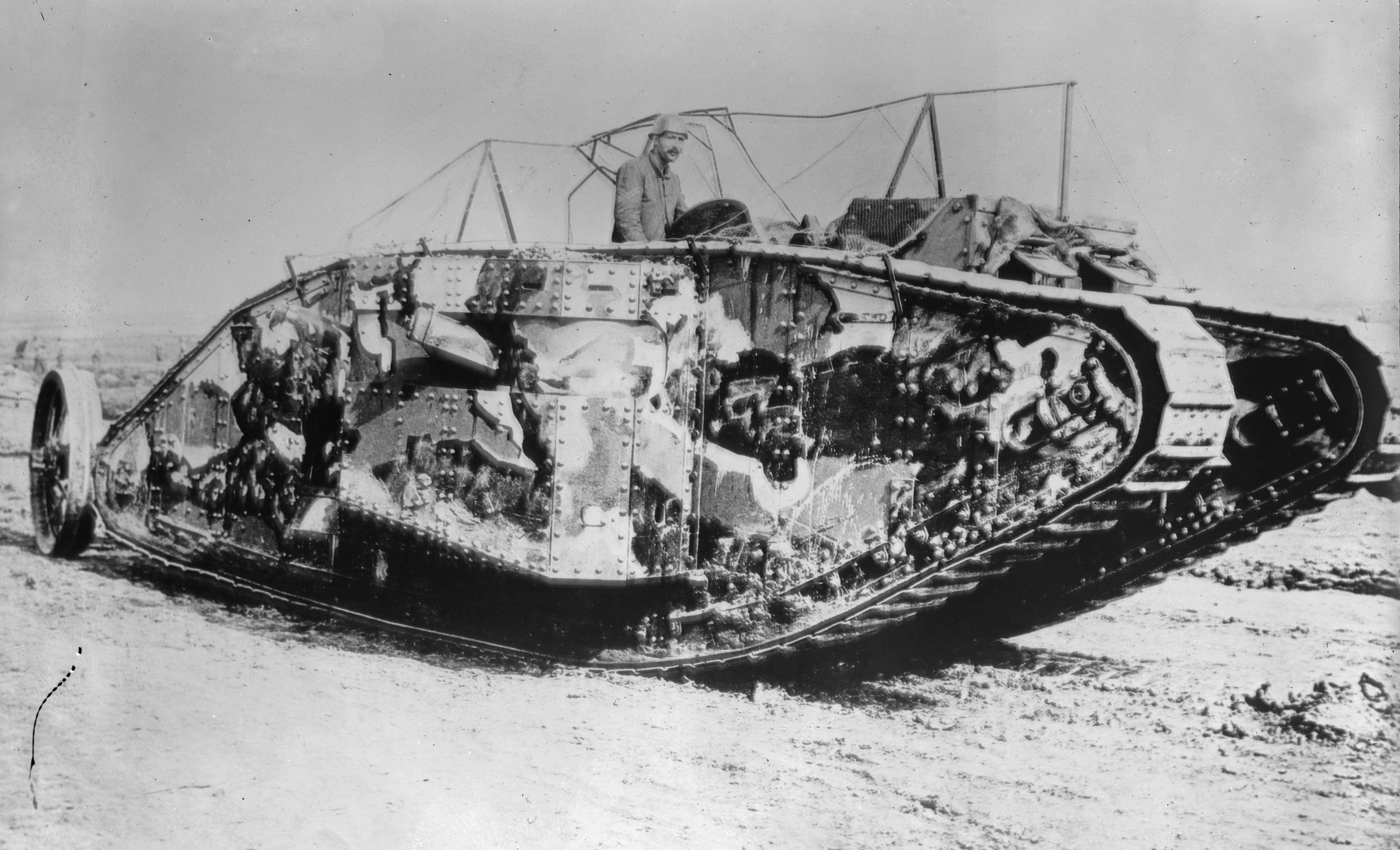
A British Mark I tank with the Solomon camouflage scheme

During World War I, Solomon was a pioneer of camouflage techniques. Having originally signed-up at the start of the war as a private in The Artists Rifles, a Territorial Force regiment, he promoted his ideas on camouflage, initially in the press and then directly to senior army officers.

In December 1915, General Herbert Plumer arranged for Solomon to visit the front lines and investigate techniques in use by the French. His ideas were accepted, and he was asked to set up a team to start the production of camouflage materials in France. On 31 December 1915, General Douglas Haig, Commander-in-chief of the British forces in France, instructed that Solomon be given the temporary rank of Lieutenant-Colonel to enable him to carry out his new duties.

The new unit's first task was the design of armoured observation posts disguised as trees, following the pioneering work of the French Section de Camouflage led by Lucien-Victor Guirand de Scévola. The first British tree observation post was put up on 22 March 1916. Solomon was effective at the artistic and technical tasks of designing trees and nets, but not as a commander. He was replaced in March 1916, instead becoming a technical advisor, a role that suited him better. In May 1916, he was sent to England to help develop tank camouflage. Solomon doubted that tanks could be effectively camouflaged since they cast a large shadow. Instead, he argued for the use of camouflage netting, with which he gradually became obsessed, claiming that the Germans were hiding huge armies under immense nets. Camouflage netting was at first considered unimportant by the army; it was not manufactured in large quantities until 1917. Eventually, in 1920, he published a book, Strategic Camouflage, arguing this case, to critical derision in England but with some support from German newspapers.

In December 1916, Solomon established a camouflage school in Hyde Park which was eventually taken over by the army.

== Family life ==
Solomon's sister was artist Lily Delissa Joseph, and his sister's daughter Gertrude Golda Lowy was a suffragette and member of the Women's Social and Political Union (WSPU) and the Jewish League for Woman Suffrage.

In 1897 Solomon was married to Ella Montagu, the daughter of Hyman Montagu, F.S.A.

Solomon's daughter, Iris, was married to Ewen Montagu, one of the "brains" behind Operation Mincemeat in World War Two. Their daughter is art historian Jennifer Montagu.

Solomon was a second-cousin once-removed of the American playwright Moss Hart.

== Bibliography ==
- Pery, Jenny (1990). Solomon J Solomon RA. Ben Uri Art Gallery.
- Rankin, Nicholas (2008). Churchill's Wizards: The British Genius for Deception 1914-1945. Faber and Faber. ISBN 978-0-571-22196-7.
- Bach, Steven (2002). Dazzler: The Life and Times of Moss Hart. Da Capo Press. ISBN 978-0306811357.
- Forbes, Peter (2009). Dazzled and Deceived: Mimicry and Camouflage. Yale University Press. ISBN 978-0300178968.
