= Penelope Jackson =

New Zealand art historian, curator and art crime expert

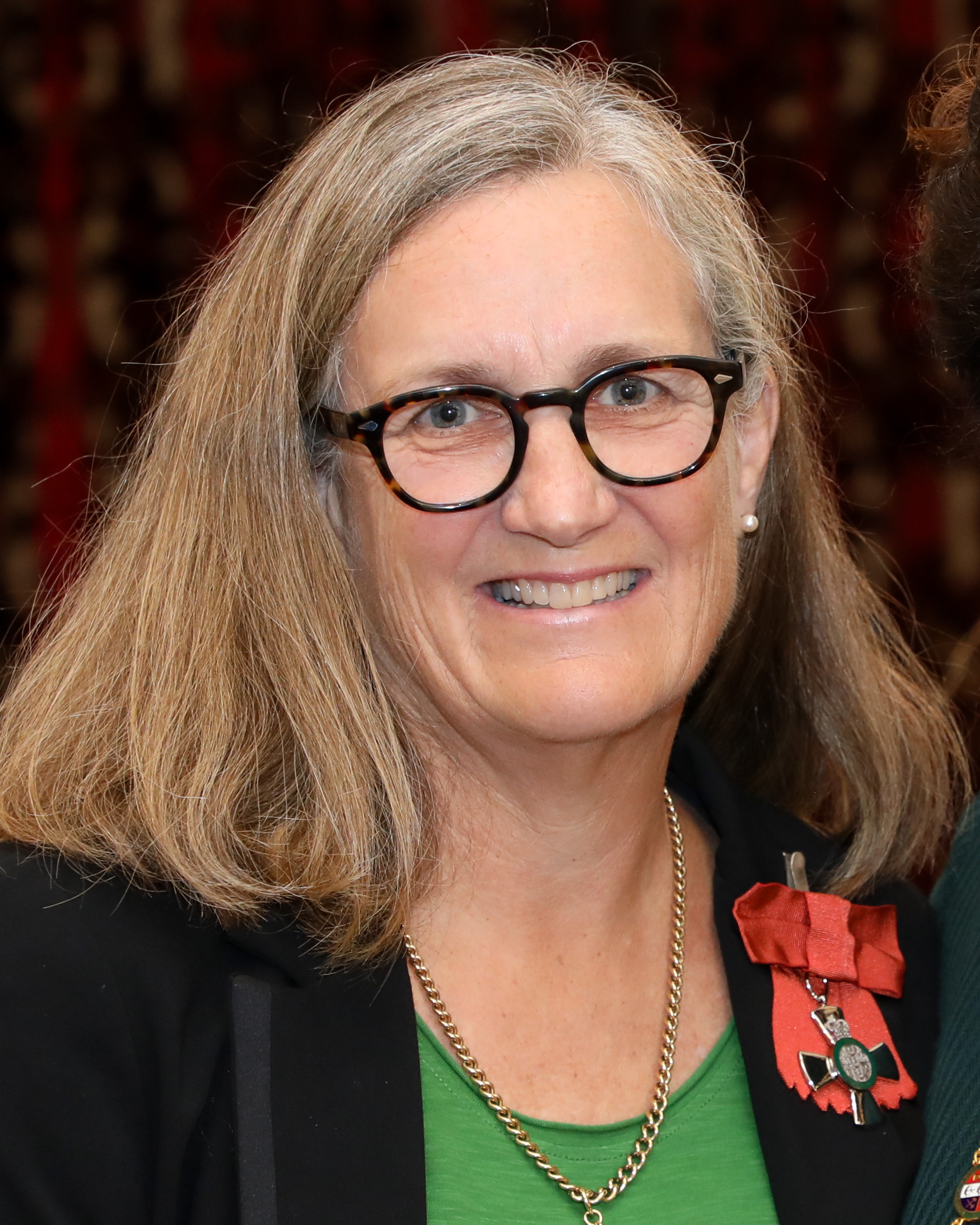
Jackson in 2023

Penelope Jane Jackson MNZM is a New Zealand art historian, curator, author and art crime expert. She is the chair of the New Zealand Art Crime Research Trust.

Jackson became curator of the Tauranga Art Gallery in 2003, and became its director in 2010. She resigned in 2015. Jackson has a PhD from Charles Sturt University, NSW, Australia.

== Books ==
Jackson is the author of four books: "Art Thieves, Fakes & Fraudsters: The New Zealand Story", published in 2016, "Females in the Frame: Women, Art, and Crime", published in 2019, and "The Art of Copying Art", published in 2022, UNSEEN: Art and Crime in Australia (Monash UP).

== Recognition ==
In the 2023 New Year Honours, Jackson was appointed a Member of the New Zealand Order of Merit, for services to art crime research and visual arts.

== Personal life ==
She married her husband in 1985. They have a daughter, who is an art historian, and a son.
