= Robert McDougall (philanthropist) =

New Zealand businessman and philanthropist (1860–1942)

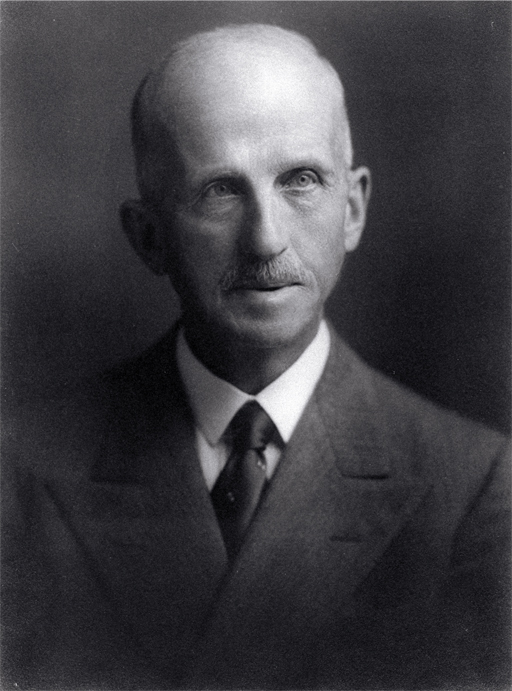
- McDougall, circa 1930
- Born: Robert Ewing McDougall; 26 December 1860; Melbourne, Australia
- Died: 21 February 1942; Christchurch
- Known for: Robert McDougall Art Gallery and Aulsebrooks and Co.

Robert Ewing McDougall (26 December 1860 – 21 February 1942), sometimes referred to as Robert Euing McDougall, was a New Zealand businessman and philanthropist in Christchurch. He was the benefactor of the Robert McDougall Art Gallery.

== Early life ==
McDougall was born in Melbourne in 1860 and moved to Christchurch in 1863. He was educated at Charles Cook's Private School and Christ's College. McDougall's father, W.E. McDougall, was a partner of the Aulsebrooks Bakery with John Aulsebrook. His father left the partnership after two years but bought an interest in the company for his son.

== Career ==
Before taking over the ownership and management of Aulsebrooks Bakery, McDougall worked as a junior clerk in the Colonial Bank of New Zealand and also managed Lane's Flour Mill, on Mill Island in the Avon. In 1889 John Aulsebrook moved to Sydney and sold the rest of the Aulsebrooks Bakery to Robert McDougall. McDougall remained governing director of the company for the rest of his life. He was also a director of the Kaiapoi Woollen Manufacturing Company Ltd., and the Mutual Benefit Building Society. He was a founding member of the Canterbury Industrial Association, which is now known as the Canterbury Manufacturers’ Association.

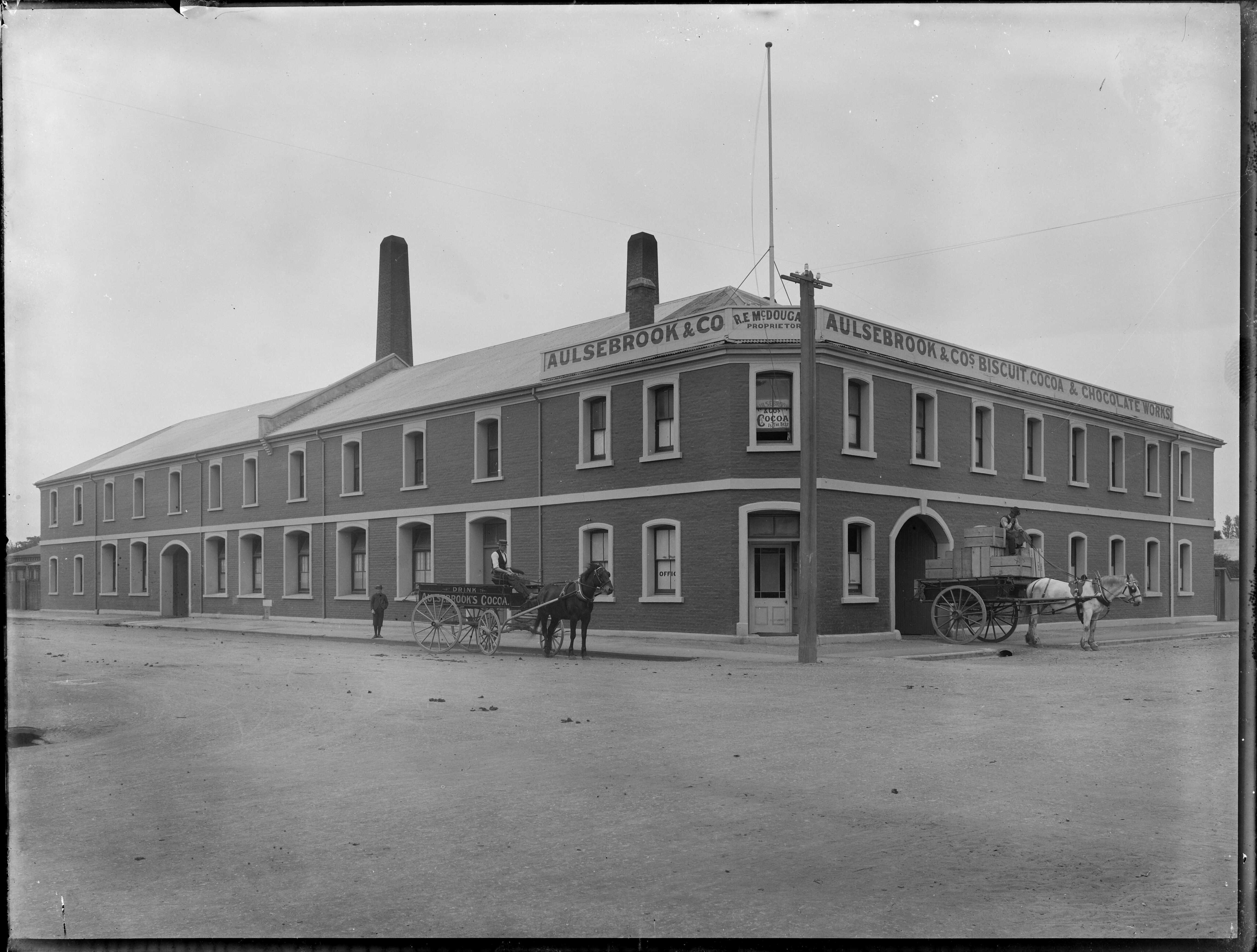
Aulsebrooks and Co. factory

McDougall died at his residence on 21 February 1942.

== Legacy ==
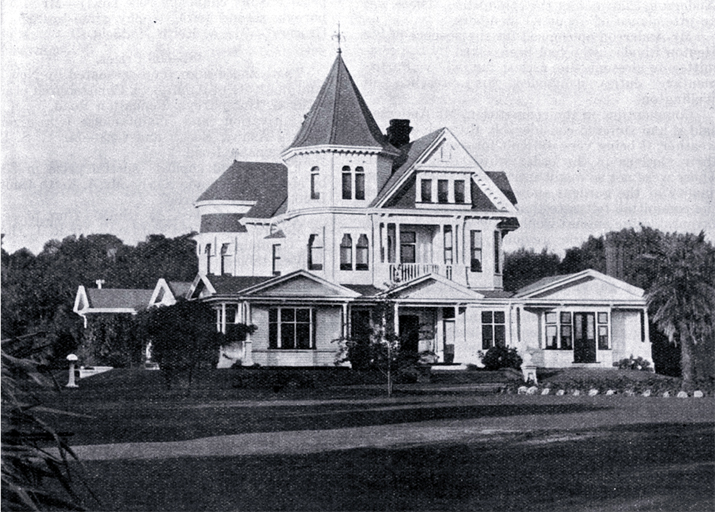
McDougall's family home Fitzroy; now known as McDougall House

His interest in art led him to donate £26,000 to go towards the building of a new Art Gallery for Christchurch in the Botanic Gardens now called the Robert McDougall Art Gallery. His family home in Merivale, called Fitzroy was donated to the nursing organization Nurse Maude where it is still based today and now named McDougall House. The street in Christchurch McDougall Avenue is named after McDougall.
