= Robert McDougall Art Gallery =

Building in Christchurch, New Zealand

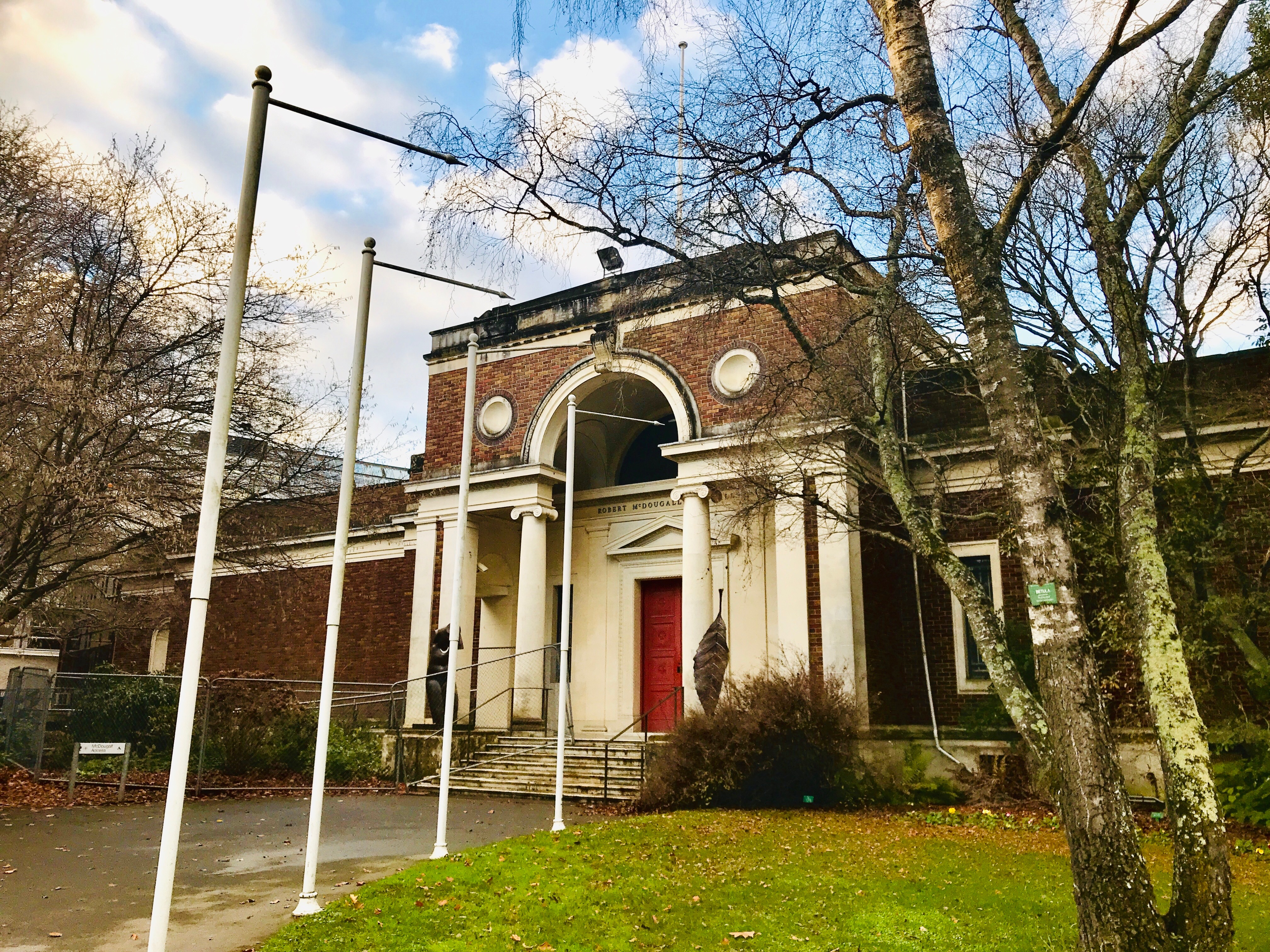
- Robert McDougall Art Gallery (2018)

General information
- Architectural style: Neo-classical
- Location: Christchurch Botanic Gardens, 9 Rolleston Avenue, Christchurch, New Zealand
- Coordinates: 43°31′51″S 172°37′34″E
- Current tenants: Canterbury Museum
- Completed: 1932
- Landlord: Christchurch City Council

Design and construction
- Architect: Edward Armstrong

Heritage New Zealand – Category 1
- Designated: 2 April 1985
- Reference no.: 303

The Robert McDougall Art Gallery is a heritage building in Christchurch, New Zealand. It was designed by Edward Armstrong and it opened in 1932. It is a Category I heritage building listed with Heritage New Zealand and is located within the Christchurch Botanic Gardens.

== History ==
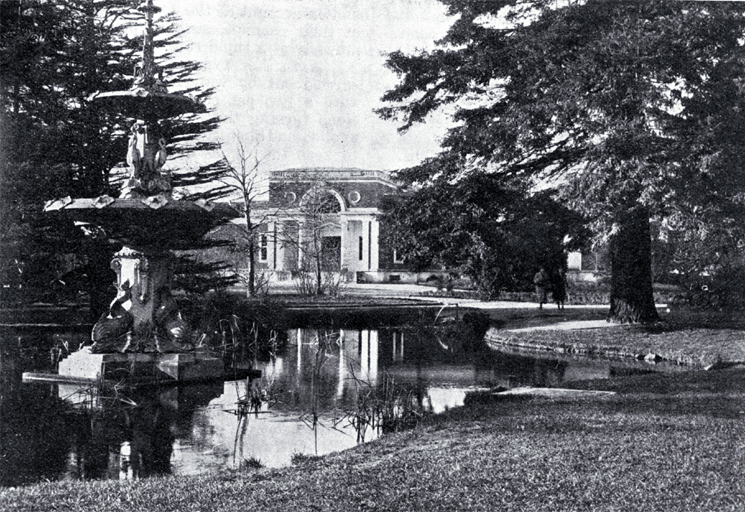
The Robert McDougall Art Gallery behind the Peacock Fountain in 1935 (one of the Peacock fountain's former locations)

In 1925 James Jamieson, a wealthy local building contractor, pledged to leave his art collection to Christchurch City on the condition that a new premises were built to house it. The Christchurch City Council held a referendum to gauge public support for taking out a loan to pay for the new gallery. This idea was rejected and nothing happened until 1928 when Robert McDougall donated £25,000 for the gallery to be built. A competition was set up to find an agreeable design. The selection committee, which included Robert McDougall, choose Edward Armstrong's design. The site in the botanic gardens behind the Canterbury Museum was chosen. Building of the new gallery commenced in November 1930 and by April 1932 it was near completion when funds ran low. Robert McDougall supplemented his original gift enabling the completion of the gallery at a total cost of £31,000. In total the new gallery housed 160 works, the majority of which came from two collections, the Canterbury Society of Arts and James Jamieson's collection. By 1961 the McDougall's collection had grown to 325 works, and by 2001 it was over 5,000 items. The collection outgrew the Robert McDougall Gallery and the Christchurch Art Gallery was built to house the collection in 2002.

The Robert McDougall Gallery was largely empty from the opening of the new art gallery until it was closed permanently after the September 2010 earthquake. The building survived the Christchurch earthquakes and had some repairs in 2016. Further renovations were needed, as the building was rated "earthquake prone." Since 2011, the building has remained empty.

As part of the Canterbury Museum's Rolleston Ave site major redevelopment, the Robert McDougall Gallery is being brought up to code. Its reopening is slated for 2029.

In 1942 the painting Psyche by Solomon Joseph Solomon was stolen from the gallery.

== Design ==
The single story gallery has a large central hall, with scagliola columns and marble floors. It is constructed of brick and concrete, and faced with Oamaru stone. Armstrong was inspired by the Sarjeant Gallery in Whanganui. Both the Sarjeant Gallery and the Robert McDougall Gallery use Samuel Hurst Seager's idea of 'topside lighting'. This is where skylights allow natural light to fall onto the displayed pictures without the light falling onto the visitors or the floors.
