= Henry Richard Webb =

New Zealand businessman and politician

Henry Webb FRMS JP
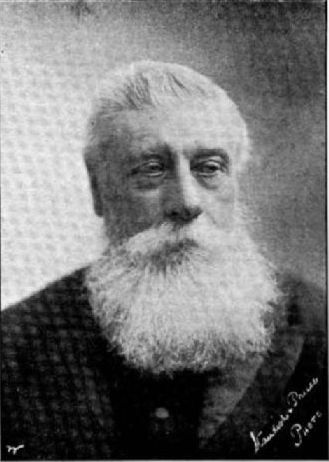
- Henry Richard Webb

Canterbury Provincial Council
- In office 13 September 1869 – 1875
- Preceded by: Hugh Murray-Aynsley

Member of the New Zealand Parliament for Lyttelton
- In office 1873–1875
- Majority: 7 (2.95%)

Personal details
- Born: 1829 Sydney, Australia
- Died: 11 February 1901 (aged 71–72) Merivale, Christchurch, New Zealand
- Resting place: Papanui, Christchurch, New Zealand
- Children: Seven sons Two daughters

Henry Richard Webb JP FRMS (1829 – 11 February 1901) was a New Zealand businessman and politician. He represented Lyttelton in Parliament for 2½ years and was a supporter of education in his later years. Born in Australia, he came to Canterbury in 1868.

== Early life ==
=== Australia ===
Webb was born in Sydney in 1829. His parents had arrived there on the ship Eliza in the previous year. He was educated at Sydney College. From an early age, he worked in the office of a business. Later on, he headed the merchant firm of Messrs Ferguson, Webb and Co. In 1851, he visited Auckland.

He was married to Ann Vaile by special licence on 27 October 1853, at St. Paul's Church, Auckland, New Zealand by the Rev. T. F. Lloyd, M.A. She was the second daughter of the architect George Vaile. She died on 21 December 1854 at 6 Victoria Terrace, Millers Point, New South Wales.

Webb was two years younger than John Thomas Peacock, who attended the same Sydney college. His second marriage was to one of Peacock's sisters Augusta Ann Peacock. He married her on 15 October 1857 at the Centenary Chapel, York Street, Sydney and emigrated to New Zealand in 1868.

=== New Zealand ===
For some years prior to 1877, when the Lyttelton Harbour Board was formed, Webb was in charge of Peacock's Wharf in Lyttelton, so named after his brother in law. In 1880, he was appointed as manager to the Permanent Investment Association of Canterbury, a role which he held for ten years. He was a director of the Mutual Life Association of Australasia.

== Political career ==
A by-election was held on 13 September 1869 for the Lyttelton seat of the Provincial Council following the resignation of Hugh Murray-Aynsley. Webb, although being new in the colony, was nominated. Since there were no other candidates, he was declared elected. He was represented on the Provincial Council until 1875, and was secretary during 1873–1875.

New Zealand Parliament
Years	Term	Electorate	Party
1873–1875	5th	Lyttelton	Independent

In April 1873, his brother in law, Peacock, was appointed to the Legislative Council and thus had to resign his seat for the Lyttelton electorate in Parliament. A by-election was set for 19 May 1873, which Webb and Murray-Aynsley contested. Webb and Murray-Aynsley received 122 and 115 votes respectively, a majority of seven for Webb, who was thus declared elected.

At the 28 December 1875 general election, the Lyttelton electorate was again contested by Webb and Murray-Aynsley. This time, Murray-Aynsley was the successful person, with a majority of 32 votes.

== Later life ==
=== Interests and memberships ===
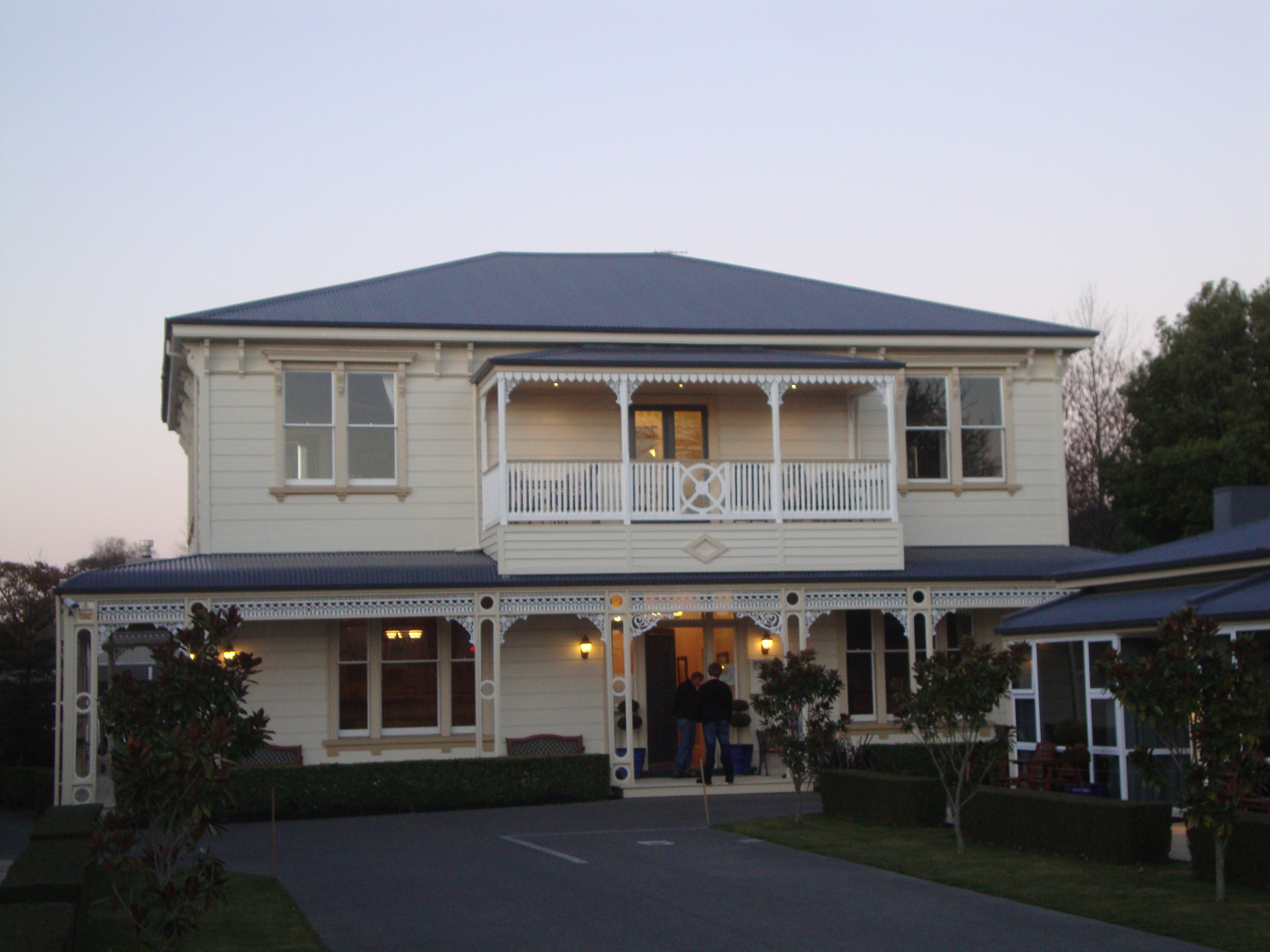
Te Wepu in 2011

In Sydney, he had been a member of the Horticultural and Agricultural Society of New South Wales. He continued this interest in Canterbury, studied botany, and was a member of the Christchurch Horticultural Society, including its chairman.

He was a member of the Royal Microscopical Society of London, and was elected a Fellow in 1880 (hence his honorific suffix FRMS).

Webb was very interested in education. He was on several education governance bodies. He was chairman of the Lyttelton School committee. He was one of the school commissioners for Canterbury for eighteen years. He was a member of the North Canterbury Board of Education for several years, including chairman. He was a member of the Canterbury College (what is these days the University of Canterbury) Board of Governors since its establishment in 1873, and was the chairman from 1894 up to the time of his death.

He was a leading member of the Anglican Church and was on various committees, both on a local and national level.

In the 1880s, he built a large residence 'Te Wepu' on Papanui Road, with an entrance off a side street that was named Webb Street. The house is used as a hotel and apartments these days and has been renamed Merivale Manor. The building is registered as Category II by Heritage New Zealand.

=== Family ===
Through his wife, a née Peacock, Webb had three brothers in law as fellow Members of Parliament.

John Evans Brown (1822–1907), known as "Yankee" Brown, married Webb's wife's sister Theresa Australia. Brown was from Pennsylvania and owned land north of the Waimakariri River inland from Kaiapoi, which he gave the Cherokee name of ‘Swannanoa’. Brown represented the Ashley electorate from 1871 to 1879, and the St Albans electorate from 1881 to 1884.

Francis James Garrick (1833–1890) was also from Sydney and attended Sydney College. He married Webb's wife's oldest sister, Elizabeth. He came to New Zealand in 1864, and succeeded Brown in the St Albans electorate from 1884-87.

And as outlined above, Webb succeeded his wife's brother John Thomas in the Lyttelton electorate in 1873 after his resignation due to his appointment to the Legislative Council.

Webb's second daughter, Malvina Mary, married Robert McDougall (1860–1942), who was the benefactor of the Robert McDougall Art Gallery that opened in 1932. The McDougall residence Fitzroy was later gifted to Nurse Maud and is still in use as a hospital, located between Mansfield and McDougall Avenues.

== Death and commemoration ==
Webb died on 11 February 1901 at his residence in Merivale. He had been suffering from gastritis. He was survived by his wife, seven sons and two daughters. The bells of the Christ Church Cathedral were rung in his honour, and many flags were flown at half mast. He was buried at Papanui cemetery.

Webb Street in Merivale carries his name. McDougall Avenue commemorates his daughter Malvina Mary's husband's name.

New Zealand Parliament
Preceded by John Thomas Peacock	Member of Parliament for Lyttelton; 1873–1875	Succeeded by Hugh Murray-Aynsley
Academic offices
Preceded by Frederick de Carteret Malet	Chairman of the Board of Governors of Canterbury College; 1894–1901	Succeeded by Thomas S. Weston
