= John Evans Brown =

New Zealand politician

John Brown
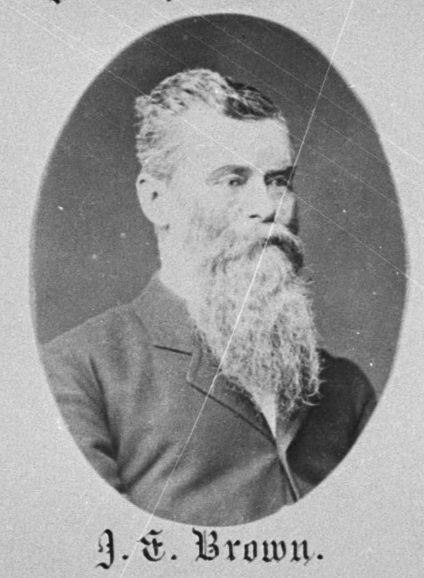
- Brown in 1882

Member of the New Zealand Parliament for St Albans
- In office 1881–1884
- Succeeded by: Francis Garrick
- Majority: 50

Member of the New Zealand Parliament for Ashley
- In office 1871–1879
- Preceded by: Henry Tancred
- Succeeded by: William Moorhouse

Personal details
- Born: 16 February 1827 Lewistown, Pennsylvania, United States
- Died: 9 July 1895 (aged 68) Asheville, North Carolina, United States
- Spouse(s): Theresa Australia Peacock; Jane (Emily) Martin
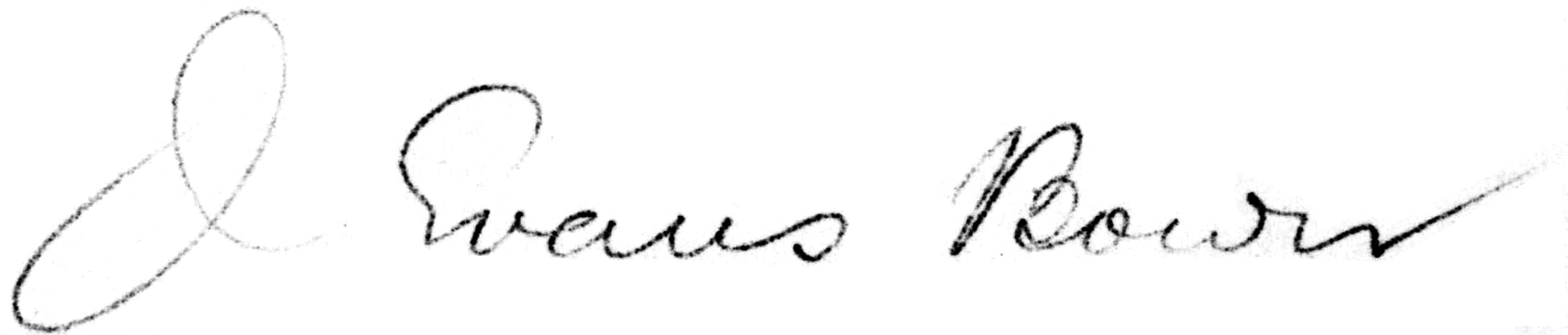
- Signature

John Evans Brown (16 February 1827 – 9 July 1895) was a 19th-century Member of Parliament in New Zealand. Born in Pennsylvania, he came to New Zealand after spending time in Australia, where he was a farmer and US Consul. He farmed in Canterbury, where he was known as "Yankee" Brown. Three of his brothers in law, through his first wife, served as his fellow Members of Parliament. He married a second time, as his first wife died young, and moved back to the United States. On his father's land in Asheville, he came to considerable wealth due to the mining of mica.

== Early life ==
Brown was born in Lewistown, Pennsylvania, the son of Major William J. Brown (1803–84) and Ann Marshall Evans. His siblings were William Caleb Brown and Samuel S. Brown. He went to California in 1849 where he worked as a surveyor for a few years, before moving to New South Wales in Australia. There he ran a sheep and cattle farm and served as US Consul. On 11 October 1859 in Sydney, he married Theresa Australia Brown (née Peacock), the daughter of John Jenkins Peacock (d. 1866) and Maria Peacock (1804–1884).

== Life in New Zealand ==
The Browns moved to New Zealand and settled in a farming community on the Eyre River near Christchurch. Brown gave the area a Cherokee name, Swannanoa, and was known in the district as "Yankee Brown". He was a main benefactor of the Swannanoa Methodist Church, which opened in 1874. He moved to Papanui in 1877, having bought property in what became Brown's Road but is now spelt Browns Road. He was the first general manager of the Christchurch Tramway Board. The residence was called Chippenham Lodge and still stands today.

=== Political career ===
New Zealand Parliament
Years	Term	Electorate	Party
1871–1875	5th	Ashley	Independent
1876–1879	6th	Ashley	Independent
1881–1884	8th	St Albans	Independent

Brown contested the Ashley electorate in the 1871 general election against Albert Charles Gray and William Miles Maskell. On election day on 18 February, Brown achieved an absolute majority, with 171 votes, and 82 and 67 votes for Gray and Maskell, respectively.

The nominations for the 1876 general election took place in Leithfield on 30 December 1875. Brown and Maskell were put forward. Both reflected on their experience; Brown had by now been in parliament for five years, and Maskell had held the Sefton seat on the Canterbury Provincial Council for ten years (since 1866). The election was held on 11 January 1876, and Brown and Maskell received 266 and 197 votes respectively.

Brown announced several months before the 1879 general election that he would not stand again for Ashley, but that he may consider contesting another electorate. In response to several deputations urging him to stand again, Brown announced in mid August that his situation had now changed, and he would not stand at all. His friends would have to "release him from his promise not to stand", but he would consider putting his name forward if they did release him. Brown did not contest any electorate in 1879, but William Sefton Moorhouse, Walpole Cheshire Fendall and Cunningham contested the Ashley seat, with Moorhouse winning with a majority of 65 votes.

Brown contested the St Albans electorate in the 9 December 1881 general election with J. L. Wilson and A. W. O'Neill. They received 218, 168 and 85 votes, respectively. Brown was declared elected. He did not stand for re-election in the 22 July 1884 general election.

=== Family ===
His son William Vance Brown (b. 1864) was one of the first Lincoln College students. He managed the Wai-iti run for his uncle John Thomas Peacock. His second daughter Kate (Katy) Elizabeth Brown was born on 4 September 1867. His daughter Maria Theresa later married Reverend H. Fields. Hubert Evans was another son. The eldest son was John Peacock Brown. He was educated at Christ's College during 1873–74 and died on 5 February 1877. John Evans Brown, the youngest son, died only five days later on 10 February 1877, aged 11 months. At least three of Brown's children were buried in Christchurch's Barbadoes Street Cemetery. His wife Theresa never recovered from this loss and died on 11 February 1880, aged 42.

Through his wife Theresa, Brown had three brothers in law as fellow Members of Parliament.

John Thomas Peacock, Theresa's brother, was elected unopposed to Parliament at the 1868 by-election in the Lyttelton electorate He was confirmed in the 1871 election for Lyttelton, again elected unopposed. In early April 1873, Peacock was promoted to the Legislative Council (the upper house) and resigned from Parliament on 5 April 1873.

Henry Richard Webb married one of the Peacock sisters in 1857 in Sydney and emigrated to New Zealand in 1868. He succeeded John Thomas Peacock in the Lyttelton electorate in 1873, and held the seat until the end of 1875.

Francis James Garrick (1833–1890), from Sydney, married Theresa's oldest sister, Elizabeth. He came to New Zealand in 1864, and succeeded Brown in the St Albans electorate from 1884-87.

== Return to America ==
Brown remarried on 20 December 1883, to Jane (Emily) Martin, at St Peter's Church in Wellington. Brown left Parliament and the parents emigrated to America with four of their children (Maria Theresa, Kate Elizabeth, Potter Maclay, and Sydney Hubert; William Vance Brown followed the next year). They left Lyttelton on 30 August 1884 (the same year as his father died) on board the Tongariro, sailing for Rio de Janeiro. They went to Asheville in North Carolina, as his father (1803–84) owned large areas of land there. The land was considered to be worthless, but the Browns found mica deposits. They built a factory and gained considerable wealth. Brown built a homestead that he called Zealandia Castle. His daughter Kate Elizabeth married at Asheville on 18 November 1892, had three children and died in New York.

Brown died on 9 July 1895 in Asheville.

New Zealand Parliament
Preceded by Henry Tancred	Member of Parliament for Ashley; 1871–1879	Succeeded by William Sefton Moorhouse
New constituency	Member of Parliament for St Albans; 1881–1884	Succeeded by Francis James Garrick
