= John Thomas Peacock =

New Zealand businessman, philanthropist and politician

The Hon John Thomas Peacock MLC
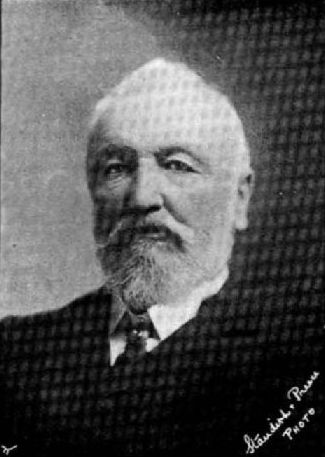
- John Thomas Peacock

Canterbury Provincial Council

Member of the New Zealand Parliament for Lyttelton
- In office 1868–1873
- Preceded by: George Macfarlan
- Succeeded by: Henry Richard Webb
- Majority: unopposed

New Zealand Legislative Council
- In office 1873–1905

1st Mayor of St Albans
- In office 14 December 1881 – 20 November 1883
- Succeeded by: J. L. Wilson

Personal details
- Born: 1827 Hawkesbury district
- Died: 20 October 1905 (aged 77–78) Papanui
- Resting place: Linwood Cemetery; 43.53850°S 172.68630°E
- Spouse(s): Kate Hickman Peacock (née Mansfield); Janey McRae (his adoptive daughter)
- Relations: father John Jenkins Peacock brother in law John Evans Brown brother in law Francis James Garrick brother in law Henry Richard Webb nephew Robert McDougall
- Children: adoptive daughter Janey, two stepsons from his second marriage
- Occupation: merchant, businessman, politician

John Thomas Peacock MLC JP (1827 – 20 October 1905) was a New Zealand businessman, philanthropist and politician. He came to Canterbury in 1844, several years before organised settlement started.

== Early life ==
Peacock was born in 1827 in the Hawkesbury district, New South Wales, Australia. He is the eldest son of John Jenkins Peacock (d. 1866) and his wife Maria Peacock (1804/05–1884). He attended Sydney College. The family arrived in Lyttelton in 1844. Settlement organised by the Canterbury Association started in December 1850, so the Peacocks were in the colony at an early stage.

His father was a hard worker. It is said about him that "he could be seen at Lyttelton ... at 6 am on a frosty morning, knee deep in the water loading a boat with sacks of potatoes for shipment by his brig which lay at anchor some distance away."

In August 1854, Peacock married Kate Hickman Peacock (née Mansfield, born ca 1835). They did not have any children, but adopted Janey, the ex-nuptial daughter of a family servant. On 14 June 1877, Janey married Alexander McRae. The Peacocks were generous to their adopted daughter and her children. Janey's husband was unfaithful and violent and their marriage was dissolved exactly ten years later.

== Life in New Zealand ==
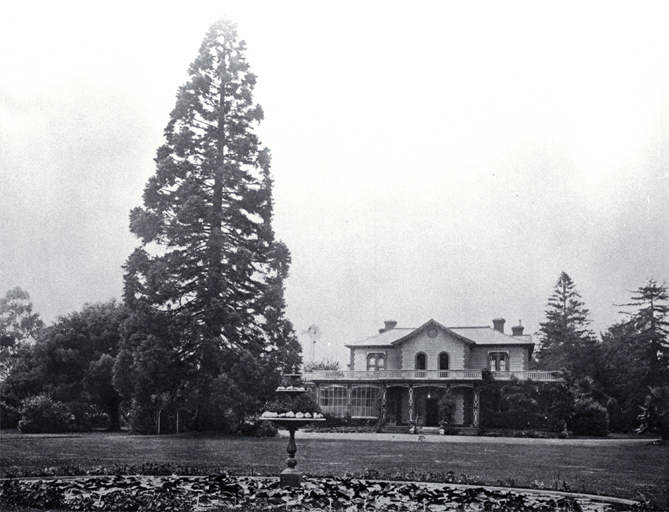
Hawkesbury residence in 1905

Peacock was a merchant and later owned several ships. He had Peacock's Wharf built, the first substantial place for landing a boat in Lyttelton. He traded as J.T. Peacock and Co., had a large trade and was successful enough that he could retire from trading in 1863, aged 37. He sold his business to Charles Wesley Turner (1834–1906) and Beverley Buchanan.

In the same year, he built his residence 'Hawkesbury' in Merivale (43.51240°S 172.62280°E). The residence was named after the district he was born in and was designed by Samuel Farr (1827–1918). Its driveway was located at what is now 184 Papanui Road, and ran for about 140 m before reaching the house. The property was surrounded by Papanui Road, Mansfield Avenue and St Albans Street and four gardeners were employed for the upkeep of the gardens. An archery ground, a bowling green, a tennis court and a swimming pool were on the grounds. The house was demolished in 1920 and the land subdivided.

Peacock was involved with many companies, often on the board of directors. By buying the plant for the Kaiapoi Woollen Manufacturing Company, he enabled the success of this industry for the region. He was chairman of the local board of directors of the London-based Alliance Assurance Company, and a director of the Union Insurance Company, which he co-founded. He held directorships of the Christchurch Meat Company, the Permanent Investment and Loan Association of Canterbury, and the New Zealand Shipping Company. He was a director of The Press. He was one of the largest owners of the Christchurch Tramway Company. He was president of the Canterbury Club, a gentlemen's club, which still operates on the Cambridge Terrace / Worcester Boulevard corner in the Christchurch Central City.

== Political career ==
New Zealand Parliament
Years	Term	Electorate	Party
1868–1871	4th	Lyttelton	Independent
1871–1873	5th	Lyttelton	Independent

Peacock was on the Canterbury Provincial Council from 1861 to 1866 representing Lyttelton, and from 1868 to the abolition of provincial government in 1876 representing Papanui. He was Secretary of Public Works during the Rolleston superintendency. He was a justice of the peace.

The borough of St Albans was formed in December 1881. On 14 December 1881, Peacock was elected mayor unopposed. The inaugural meeting of the borough council was held on 3 January 1882. On 22 November 1882, his term expired and he was the only candidate for the position. Hence, he was declared elected for a second term as mayor. J. L. Wilson was the only candidate for mayor on 20 November 1883 and was declared elected.

Another local political role included membership of the Lyttelton Harbour Board for over 20 years, including chairmanship.

Peacock was elected unopposed to Parliament at a 2 November 1868 by-election in the Lyttelton electorate and took the oath and his seat on 11 June 1869. He was confirmed in the 1871 election for Lyttelton, again elected unopposed.

In early April 1873, Peacock was promoted to the New Zealand Legislative Council (the upper house). He resigned from Parliament on 5 April 1873. The resulting by-election on 19 May 1873 was won by Henry Richard Webb.

Peacock was a member of the Legislative Council until his death, although in 1877 he had been reappointed after Disqualification by inadvertence.

== Family life ==
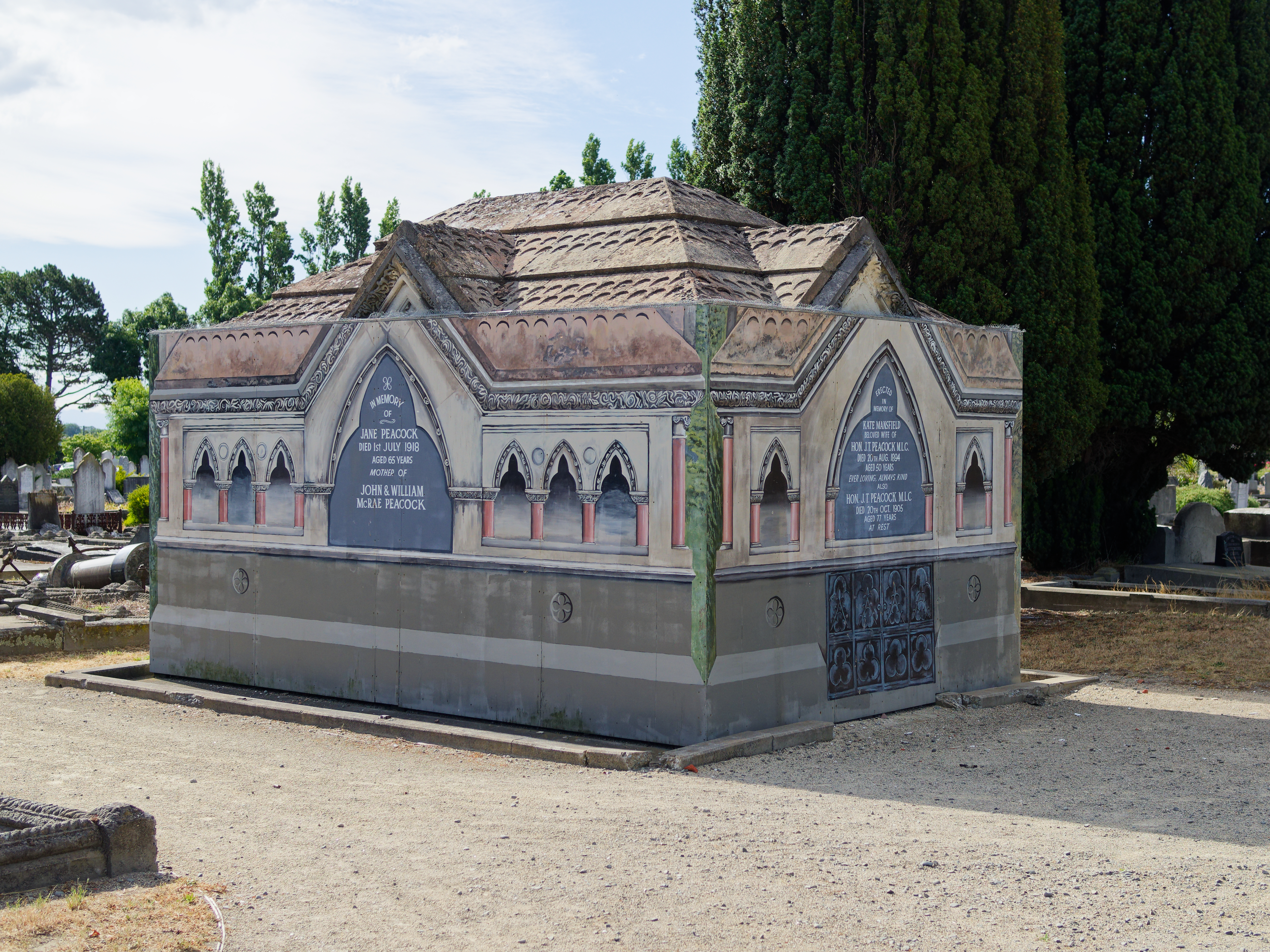
The Peacock Mausoleum at Linwood Cemetery

Peacock had three brothers-in-law as fellow Members of Parliament.

John Evans Brown (1822–1907), known as "Yankee" Brown, married Peacock's sister Theresa Australia. Brown was from Pennsylvania and owned land north of the Waimakariri River inland from Kaiapoi, which he gave the Cherokee name of ‘Swannanoa’. Brown represented the Ashley electorate from 1871 to 1879, and the St Albans electorate from 1881 to 1884.

Henry Richard Webb (1829–1901), who succeeded Peacock in the Lyttelton electorate, was two years his junior and had also attended Sydney College. He married one of Peacock's sisters in 1857 in Sydney and emigrated to New Zealand in 1868. He represented the Lyttelton electorate from 1873 to 1875. One of his daughters, Malvina Mary, would later marry Robert McDougall (1860–1942), who was the benefactor of the Robert McDougall Art Gallery that opened in 1932. The McDougall residence Fitzroy was later gifted to Nurse Maud and is still in use as a hospital, located between Mansfield and McDougall Avenues.

Francis James Garrick (1833–1890) was also from Sydney and attended Sydney College. He married Peacock's oldest sister, Elizabeth. He came to New Zealand in 1864, and succeeded Brown in the St Albans electorate from 1884-87.

When Brown bought property in 1875 in what was to become Browns Road, he moved into the neighbourhood of Peacock and Garrick.

Peacock's wife died suddenly and unexpectedly on 19 August 1894 at their residence, aged 59. Two days earlier, the Peacocks had celebrated their 40th wedding anniversary.

On 30 December 1895, Peacock married again – his adopted daughter Janey. Whilst this was lawful, it was outside of the social norms.

The Peacocks were active in the Wesleyan Church.

Peacock died on 20 October 1905 at his residence Hawkesbury. He was survived by his second wife and two stepsons. He was interred at Linwood Cemetery on 21 October. Peacock's second wife Janey died in 1918, aged 65. The Peacock Mausoleum in the Linwood Cemetery still exists (Block 32 Plot 135–144) but has fallen into dereliction. The mausoleum is boarded up to protect it from weather and vandalism. In 2012, the plywood was painted by artist and Linwood Cemetery Trustee Anne Holloway with paint donated by Dulux for community projects. The mural was officially unveiled on 26 May 2012.

== Commemoration ==
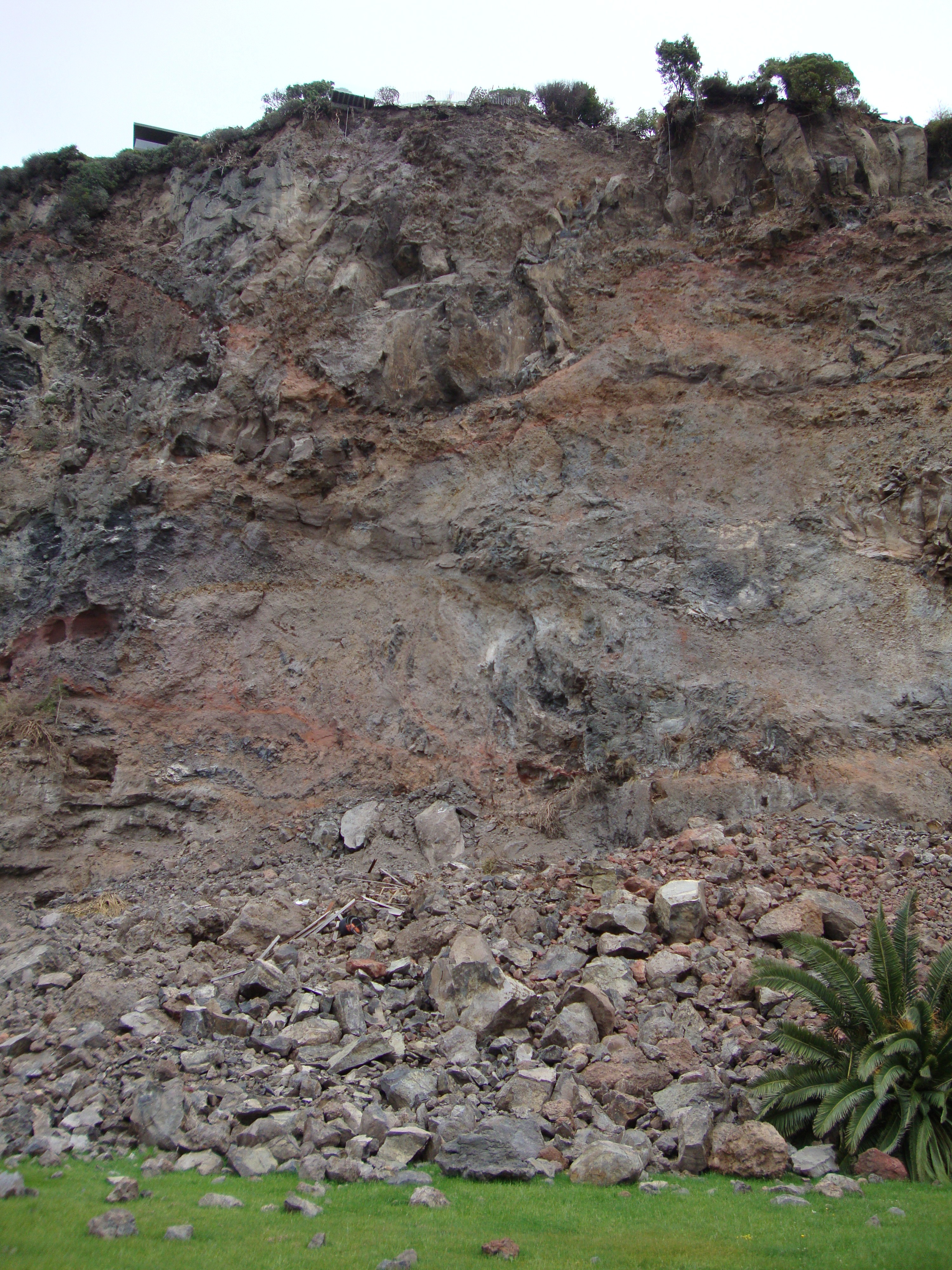
Rockfall in Peacock's Gallop reserve caused by the February 2011 Christchurch earthquake.

Peacock Fountain

Peacock bequeathed a substantial sum of money to the Christchurch Beautifying Association "for the purpose of beautifying the reserves and gardens in the City of Christchurch and improving the Avon River." The colourful Peacock Fountain was erected in the Botanic Gardens. The fountain spent many decades in storage, but has been on display again since 1996.

Peacock's Wharf

Captain Joseph Thomas built the first jetty at Lyttelton, in time for the arrival of the First Four Ships in December 1850. Peacock built the second wharf, in 1857, which was named in his honour. His obituary in the Christchurch Press says that it was the first landing-place in Lyttelton of any importance. The wharf was sold, together with Peacock's other business, to Turner and Buchanan, who in turn sold it to the Lyttelton Harbour Board in 1877. Peacock's Wharf, albeit in much modified and enlarged form, still exists, but is these days simply called "No 7 Wharf".

Streets and Reserves

Peacock Street in the Christchurch Central City is named after John Thomas Peacock.

Mansfield Avenue is named after Peacock's first wife Kate (née Mansfield).

Hawkesbury Avenue was named after the New South Wales birth district of Peacock.

Peacocks Gallop is a reserve in Sumner on reclaimed land between the former tram line (now Main Road) and some high cliffs. Peacock's father John Jenkins, when he rode by horse from Lyttelton to Sumner via Evans Pass, is said to have always been afraid of falling rocks, so he galloped along the base of the cliff.

== Notes ==
New Zealand Parliament
Preceded by George Macfarlan	Member of Parliament for Lyttelton; 1868–1873	Succeeded by Henry Richard Webb
Political offices
Preceded by Charles Wesley Turner	Chairman of the Lyttelton Harbour Board; 1884–1885; 1886–1887	Succeeded by Edward George Wright
Preceded by Edward George Wright	Chairman of the Lyttelton Harbour Board; 1884–1885; 1886–1887	Succeeded by Peter Cunningham
