= Peacock Fountain =

Fountain in Christchurch, New Zealand

Coordinates: 43.53148°S 172.62695°E

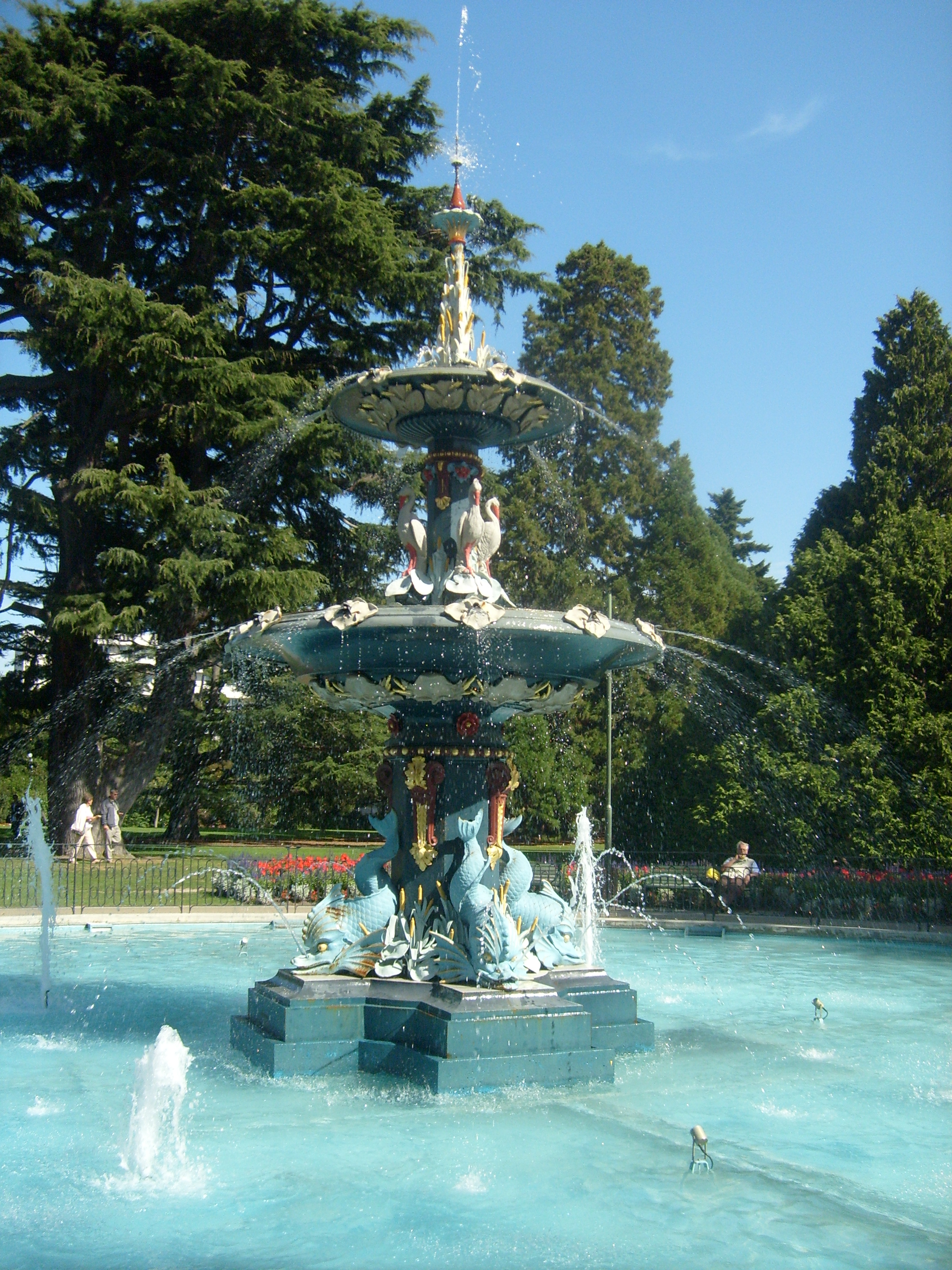
Peacock Fountain in 2008

The Peacock Fountain was bought by the Christchurch Beautifying Society from money bequeathed by John Thomas Peacock, a trader, politician and philanthropist. The fountain was unveiled in 1911, moved to a new location some years later, and put into storage in 1949. After a $270,000 renovation, it was commissioned again in 1996, in its third location in the Christchurch Botanic Gardens. It has an elaborate colour scheme and is a much photographed tourist attraction.

== Historical context ==
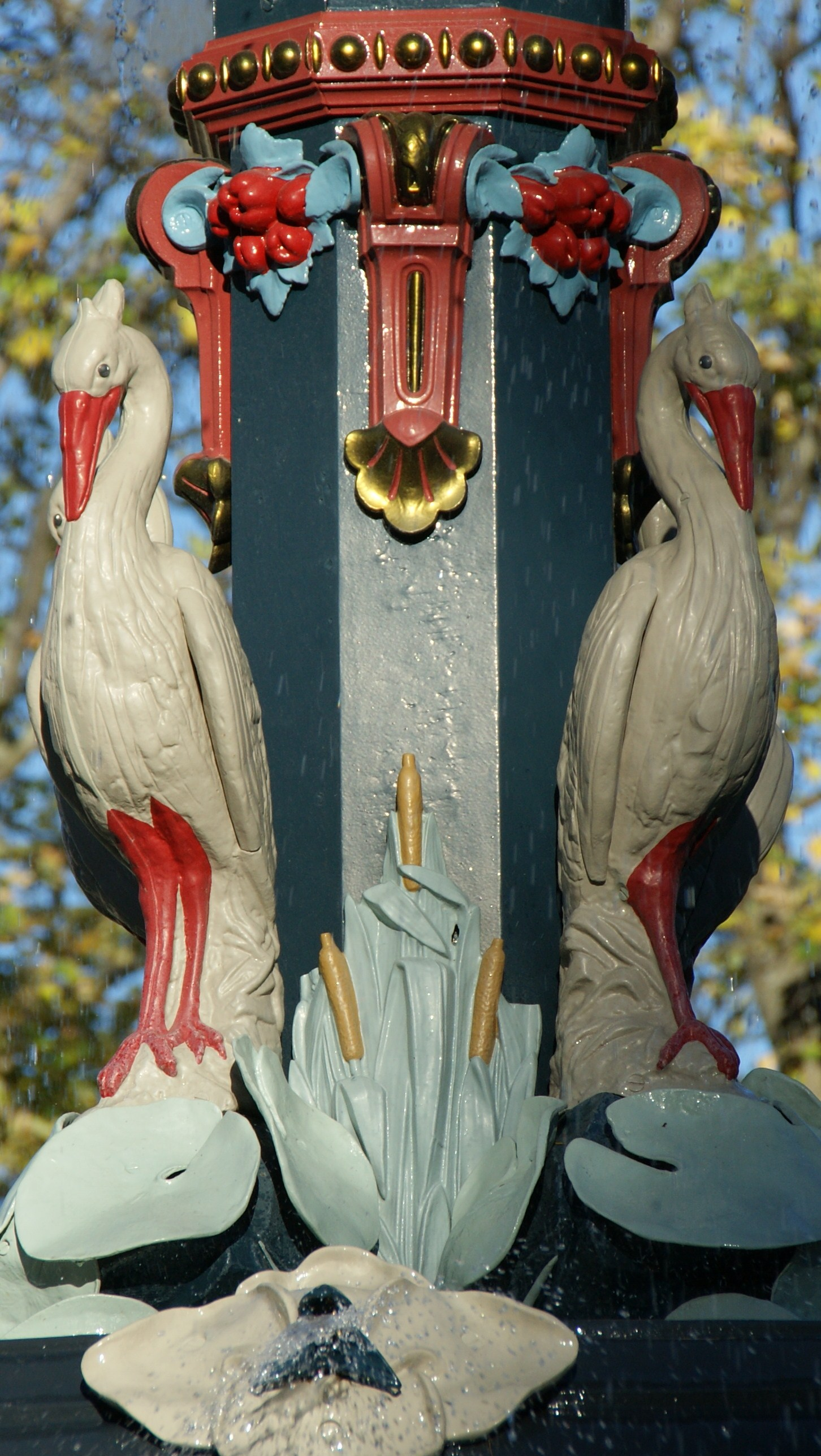
Peacock Fountain detail

Peacock (1827 – 20 October 1905) came to Lyttelton in 1844 with his parents. Settlement organised by the Canterbury Association started in December 1850, so the Peacocks were in the colony at a very early stage. He built the first substantial wharf in Lyttelton Harbour and was well established as a merchant when the First Four Ships arrived in 1850. He later owned several ships, traded as J.T. Peacock and Co. and was successful enough that he could retire from business in 1863, aged 37.

== History ==
Peacock bequeathed a substantial sum of money (either 500 or 1,000 pounds – sources give conflicting information) to the Christchurch Beautifying Association "for the purpose of beautifying the reserves and gardens in the City of Christchurch and improving the Avon River." The idea was promoted by the Christchurch City Council, with the Andersons Ltd (the foundry of the late John Anderson) supplying details of the prefabricated fountains which were created at the Coalbrookdale Iron Works. A Coalbrookdale fountain was agreed upon, to bear the following inscription:

Erected by the Christchurch Beautifying Association from funds bequeathed by the late Hon. J. T. Peacock.

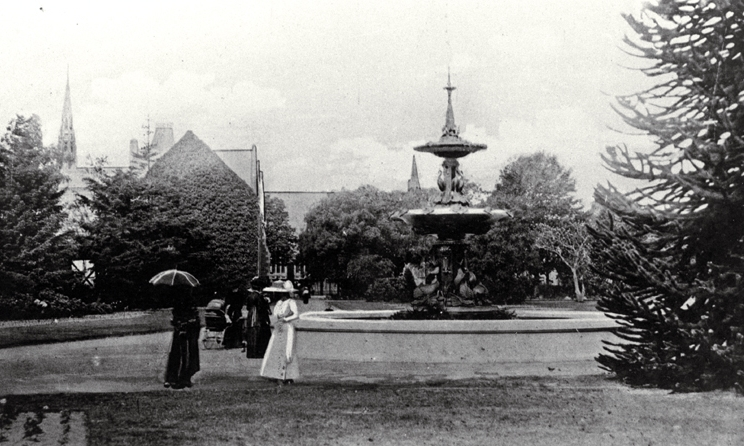
The Peacock Fountain in its first location

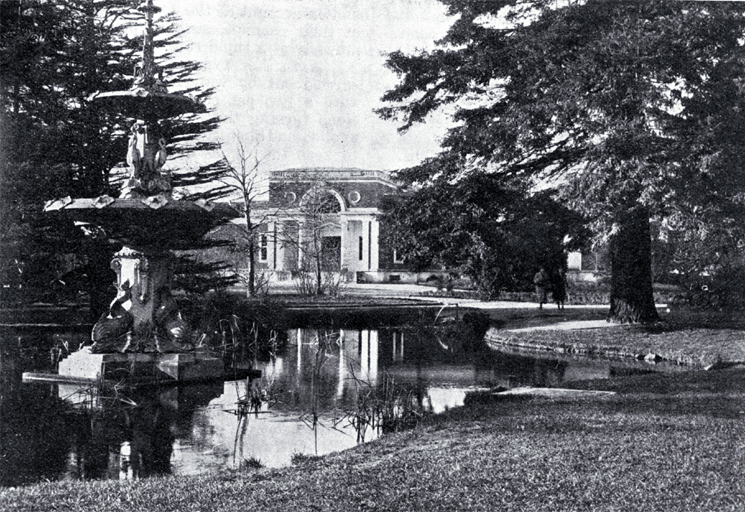
The Peacock Fountain in its second location

The fountain, unveiled in June 1911, was always controversial. It was first located in the Botanic Gardens adjacent to where the Robert McDougall Art Gallery was later built, but was moved to the Archery lawn a few years later. The head of the Canterbury College School of Art, Robert Herdman Smith, stated in a letter to the Press in 1911 that "it exhibited no more taste than the gaudy decoration used by travelling showmen to embellish their merry go-rounds."

Recurring maintenance problems led to the decision in 1949 to dismantle the fountain. It was put into storage and the parts transferred to Ferrymead Historic Park in the 1980s. Of the 309 cast iron pieces that made up the fountain, many went missing over the years or deteriorated, so that 158 of them had to be re-cast. The restored fountain, with a new colour scheme (again controversial), was recommissioned by Cr Margaret Murray and Mayor Vicki Buck on 26 May 1996 to the south of Canterbury Museum, now in its third location. One letter to The Press claimed that the new colour scheme was "cause(ing) flu-like symptoms when looked upon." The total cost of the restoration project was $270,000.
