= Frederick de Carteret Malet =

New Zealand businessman (1843–1912)

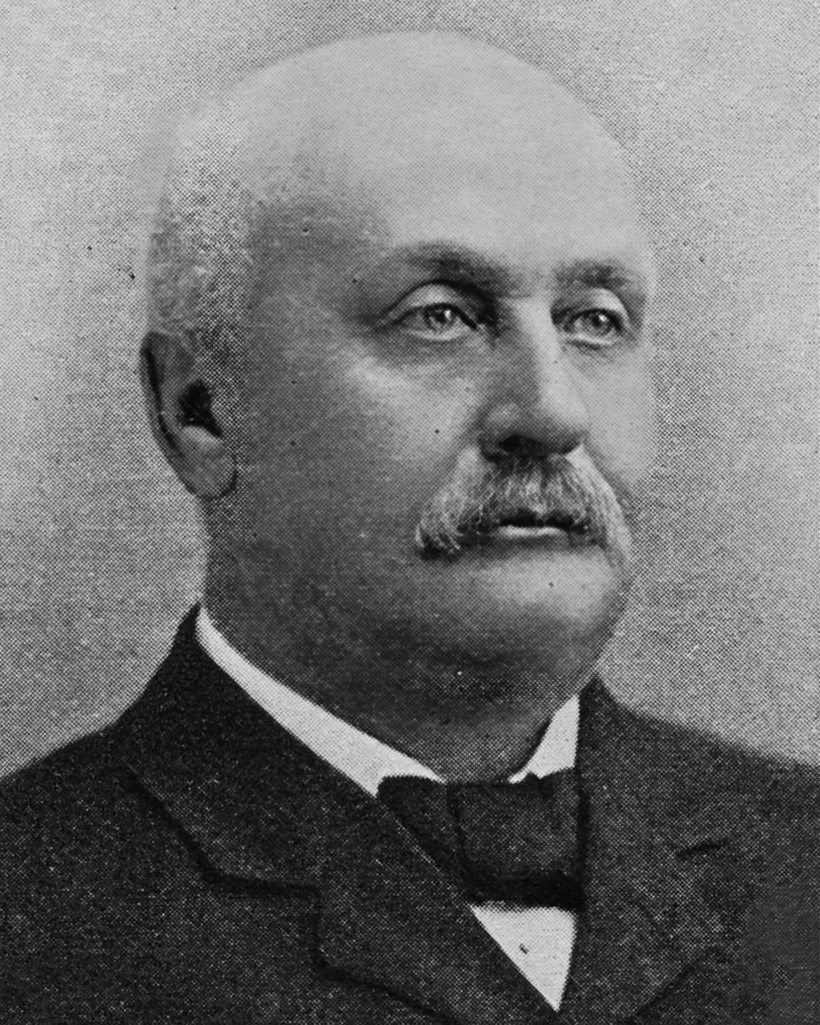
Frederick de Carteret Malet

Frederick de Carteret Malet (26 October 1843 – 21 March 1912) was a leader in business, church, and educational matters in Christchurch, New Zealand.

== Early life ==
Malet was born in 1837 at Saint Helier, Jersey. He came to Auckland, New Zealand, in 1861. He married Beatrice Wilson in 1869, daughter of Archdeacon James Wilson. William Campbell Walker married another of Archdeacon Wilson's daughters in 1871, and Malet and Walker thus became brothers-in-law.

== Professional life ==
Malet farmed in Otago and Canterbury for four years before he was appointed by the Superintendent of Canterbury Province, William Rolleston, as clerk at the Warden's Court in Hokitika. He was later a clerk to the resident magistrate in Christchurch. He became a registrar at the Supreme Court in Christchurch in 1876. He then studied law and was admitted to the bar in 1881; he practised for the next six years.

Malet was involved in educational matters. From 1872 to 1874, he was registrar of the University of New Zealand. From 1873 to 1876, he was secretary for the Board of Governors of Canterbury College. He became an elected member of the Board of Governors in 1876 and remained there until his resignation in 1895; he chaired the board from 1885 to 1894. From 1895 to 1897, he was on the Board of Governors of the Canterbury Agricultural College.

In 1888/89, he visited England. He was managing director of the Lyttelton Times from 1891 to 1893; at the time, the newspaper was already based in Christchurch. He became a director of the Bank of New Zealand in 1898 by government appointment, and was chairman of the board of directors 1902 to 1906. In 1901, he became a director of the Christchurch Meat Company, and from February 1902 to 1911, he chaired the board of directors of that company. He also held directorships with the New Zealand Shipping Company and the Permanent Investment and Loan Company.

== Family and death ==
Malet died on 21 March 1912 after having been ill for 18 months. He was survived by his wife, three sons and one daughter.

Academic offices
Preceded by William Montgomery	Chairman of the Board of Governors of Canterbury College; 1885–1894	Succeeded by Henry Richard Webb
