= 1873 Lyttelton by-election =

New Zealand by-election

The by-election for Lyttelton in 1873 was a by-election held in the Lyttelton electorate during the 5th Parliament of New Zealand, on 19 May 1873.

It was held because John Thomas Peacock was appointed to the New Zealand Legislative Council. Peacock's brother-in-law, Henry Richard Webb, won the election.

== Results ==
1873 Lyttelton by-election
Party	Candidate	Votes	%	±%
Independent	Henry Richard Webb	122	51.48	
Independent	Hugh Murray-Aynsley	115	48.52	
Turnout		237		
Majority		7	2.95	
