= Swannanoa, New Zealand =

Settlement in Canterbury, New Zealand

Swannanoa
- Village
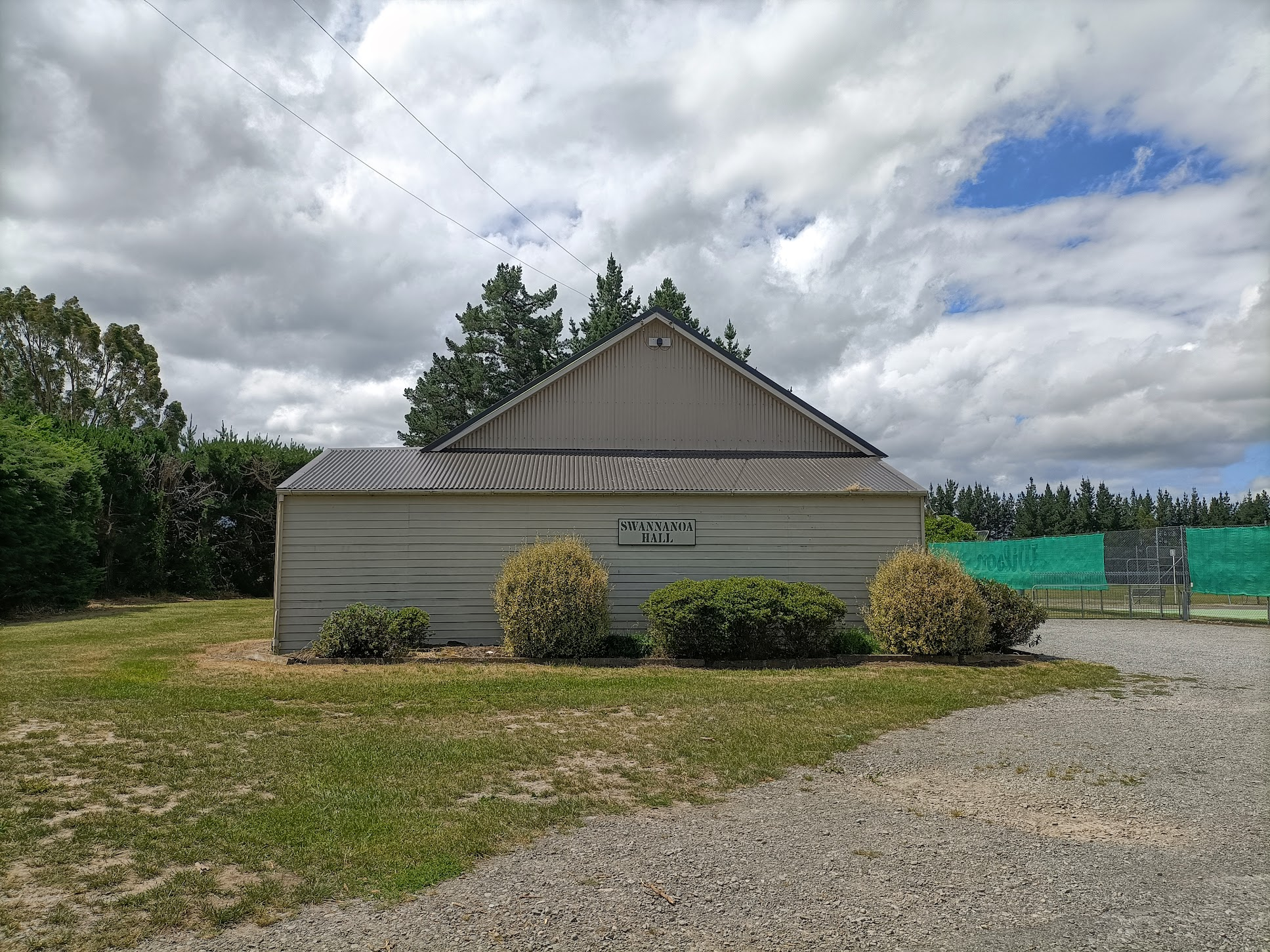
- View of Swannanoa Hall across the road from the primary school
- Interactive map of Swannanoa
- Coordinates: 43°23′S 172°28′E
- Country: New Zealand
- Island: South Island
- Region: Canterbury
- Ward: Oxford-Ohoka Ward
- Community: Oxford-Ohoka Community
- Electorates: Waimakariri; Te Tai Tonga (Māori)

Government
  - Territorial Authority: Waimakariri District Council
  - Regional council: Environment Canterbury
  - Mayor of Waimakariri: Dan Gordon
  - Waimakariri MP: Matt Doocey
  - Te Tai Tonga MP: Tākuta Ferris

Area
  - Total: 10.51 km^{2} (4.06 sq mi)

Population (2023 census)
  - Total: 387
  - Density: 36.8/km^{2} (95.4/sq mi)
- Time zone: UTC+12 (NZST)
  - Summer (DST): UTC+13 (NZDT)

Swannanoa is a small village in Canterbury, New Zealand. It is located 35 kilometres northwest of the largest city in the South Island, Christchurch. The immediate area had a population of 387 in the 2023 census with 297 pupils enrolled in the primary school. The population is slowly increasing due to new subdivisions being developed there and in neighbouring Mandeville North.

== History ==
=== John Evans Brown ===
American John Evans Brown arrived in Canterbury in 1864 and was known by the locals as "Yankee Brown". Brown settled a farm in Canterbury on land owned by his brother in-law John Thomas Peacock, and named it after the Swannanoa River in Western North Carolina. He was elected to the Rangiora and Mandeville Road Board in January 1865. At the first Northern A & P show held in 1866, he and his family showed various birds; he won a prize for a peacock and his family won prizes for four different sorts of pigeons. When Brown eventually returned to Asheville, North Carolina, he named his home there "Zealandia".

=== Peacock Family ===
John Thomas Peacock owned the land in which Swannanoa farm existed on in 1864, which was then transferred to his father, John Jenkins Peacock, in 1865. The land would remain in the Peacock family name until 1903, when it was sold to Vince William Wright.

=== Petrie Family ===
The Swannanoa farm is currently owned, and has been operated by the Petrie Family since 1957.

=== Church ===
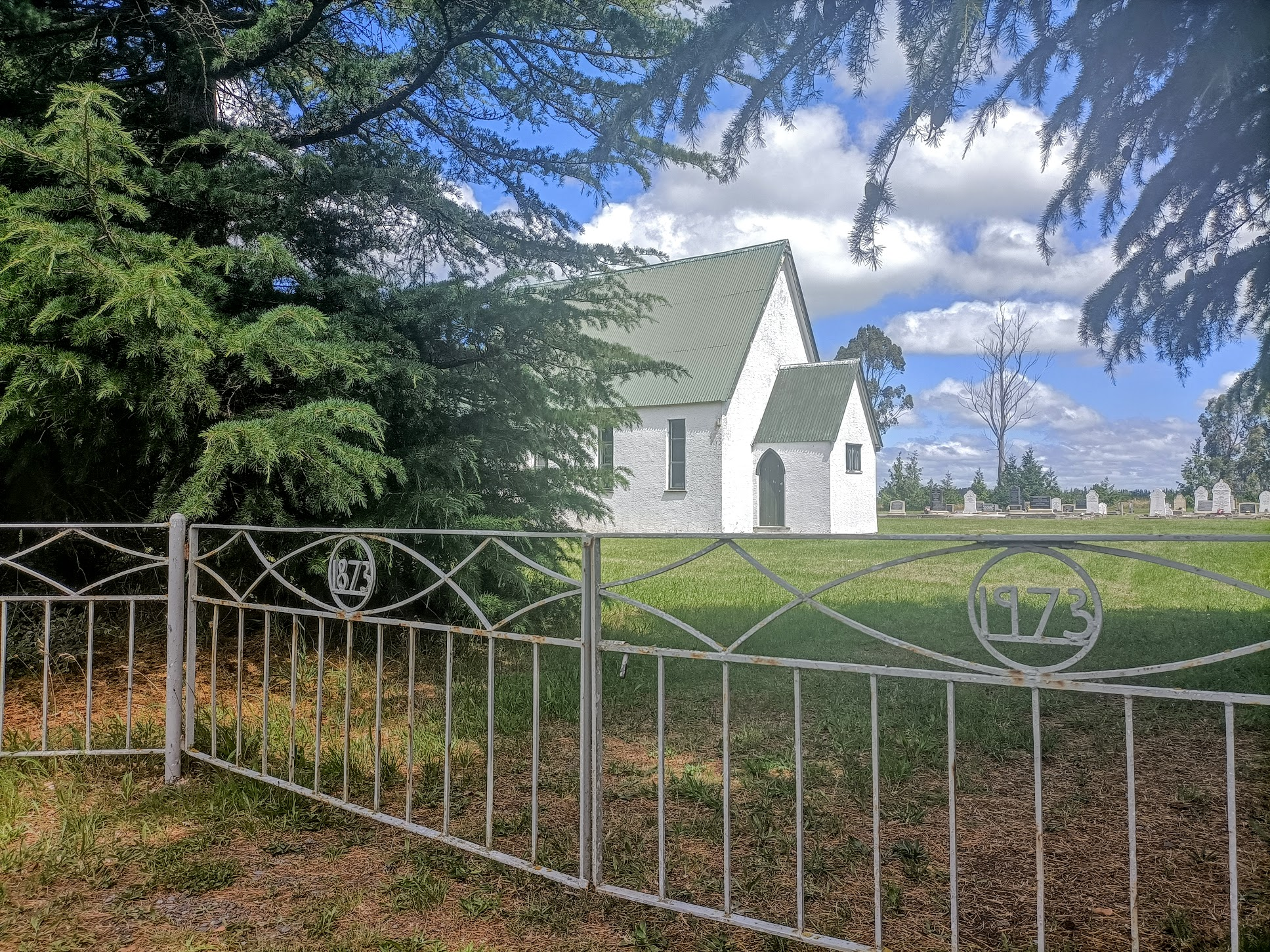
Swannanoa community church and gate

The church, which resides nearby to Swannanoa School, was opened in 1873, and was primarily funded by John Evans Brown.

=== Tram Road and Railway ===
In 1871, a meeting in the district showed that communication in the district was poor, with dray loads taking up to two days to reach Kaiapoi. By this stage, a plan for the Oxford-Rangiora branch line had already been approved by the Rangiora, Mandeville and Oxford Road Boards. The Eyre settlers asked at this time why it could not pass through their district on its way to Oxford, but a line from Kaiapoi to Oxford was seen as a threat to the Rangiora lines. A straight-line survey from Kaiapoi to Oxford was carried out in 1871, this being the road now known as Tram Road. Further surveys were carried out during 1872 of all the possible lines for the area.

The Eyre settlers continued lobbying for a line to pass through Ohoka, Mandeville, Swannanoa and West Eyreton. Eventually they prevailed and the government agreed to construct both lines, 10 km apart, which would become the Eyreton Branch. However, the line ended at West Eyreton, rather than carrying on all the way to Oxford. In August 1872, plans were finalised for the Eyreton line and construction began. It was completed in 1875 and opened on 17 December. The first train left West Eyreton for Kaiapoi on 27 December 1875. Shortly after opening, the Public Works Department announced it would be necessary to join the West Eyreton and Oxford lines to avoid losing money and on 1 February 1878, the West Eyreton-Oxford section opened.

== Demographics ==
Swannanoa covers 10.51 km^{2} (4.06 sq mi). It is part of the larger Swannanoa-Eyreton statistical area.

Historical population for Swannanoa
Year	Pop.	±% p.a.
2006	255	—
2013	327	+3.62%
2018	342	+0.90%
2023	387	+2.50%

Swannanoa had a population of 387 in the 2023 New Zealand census, an increase of 45 people (13.2%) since the 2018 census, and an increase of 60 people (18.3%) since the 2013 census. There were 195 males, 195 females, and 3 people of other genders in 126 dwellings. 3.1% of people identified as LGBTIQ+. There were 69 people (17.8%) aged under 15 years, 63 (16.3%) aged 15 to 29, 195 (50.4%) aged 30 to 64, and 60 (15.5%) aged 65 or older.

People could identify as more than one ethnicity. The results were 94.6% European (Pākehā), 3.9% Māori, 0.8% Pasifika, 3.1% Asian, and 4.7% other, which includes people giving their ethnicity as "New Zealander". English was spoken by 98.4%, Māori by 0.8%, and other languages by 5.4%. No language could be spoken by 1.6% (e.g. too young to talk). The percentage of people born overseas was 15.5, compared with 28.8% nationally.

Religious affiliations were 23.3% Christian, and 0.8% other religions. People who answered that they had no religion were 66.7%, and 8.5% of people did not answer the census question.

Of those at least 15 years old, 75 (23.6%) people had a bachelor's or higher degree, 183 (57.5%) had a post-high school certificate or diploma, and 60 (18.9%) people exclusively held high school qualifications. 57 people (17.9%) earned over $100,000 compared to 12.1% nationally. The employment status of those at least 15 was 171 (53.8%) full-time, 54 (17.0%) part-time, and 12 (3.8%) unemployed.

=== Swannanoa-Eyreton statistical area ===
The Swannanoa-Eyreton statistical area, which also includes Eyreton, covers 61.77 km^{2} (23.85 sq mi). It had an estimated population of 1,040 as of June 2025, with a population density of 17 people per km^{2}.

Historical population for Swannanoa-Eyreton
Year	Pop.	±% p.a.
2006	699	—
2013	906	+3.78%
2018	954	+1.04%
2023	990	+0.74%

Swannanoa-Eyreton had a population of 990 in the 2023 New Zealand census, an increase of 36 people (3.8%) since the 2018 census, and an increase of 84 people (9.3%) since the 2013 census. There were 492 males, 498 females, and 3 people of other genders in 348 dwellings. 2.1% of people identified as LGBTIQ+. The median age was 44.4 years (compared with 38.1 years nationally). There were 171 people (17.3%) aged under 15 years, 168 (17.0%) aged 15 to 29, 501 (50.6%) aged 30 to 64, and 153 (15.5%) aged 65 or older.

People could identify as more than one ethnicity. The results were 94.2% European (Pākehā), 6.4% Māori, 1.5% Pasifika, 3.3% Asian, and 4.2% other, which includes people giving their ethnicity as "New Zealander". English was spoken by 98.8%, Māori by 1.2%, Samoan by 0.3%, and other languages by 6.7%. No language could be spoken by 1.2% (e.g. too young to talk). New Zealand Sign Language was known by 0.3%. The percentage of people born overseas was 14.5, compared with 28.8% nationally.

Religious affiliations were 29.4% Christian, and 1.5% other religions. People who answered that they had no religion were 61.5%, and 7.6% of people did not answer the census question.

Of those at least 15 years old, 198 (24.2%) people had a bachelor's or higher degree, 468 (57.1%) had a post-high school certificate or diploma, and 147 (17.9%) people exclusively held high school qualifications. The median income was $46,900, compared with $41,500 nationally. 144 people (17.6%) earned over $100,000 compared to 12.1% nationally. The employment status of those at least 15 was 450 (54.9%) full-time, 147 (17.9%) part-time, and 18 (2.2%) unemployed.

== Education ==
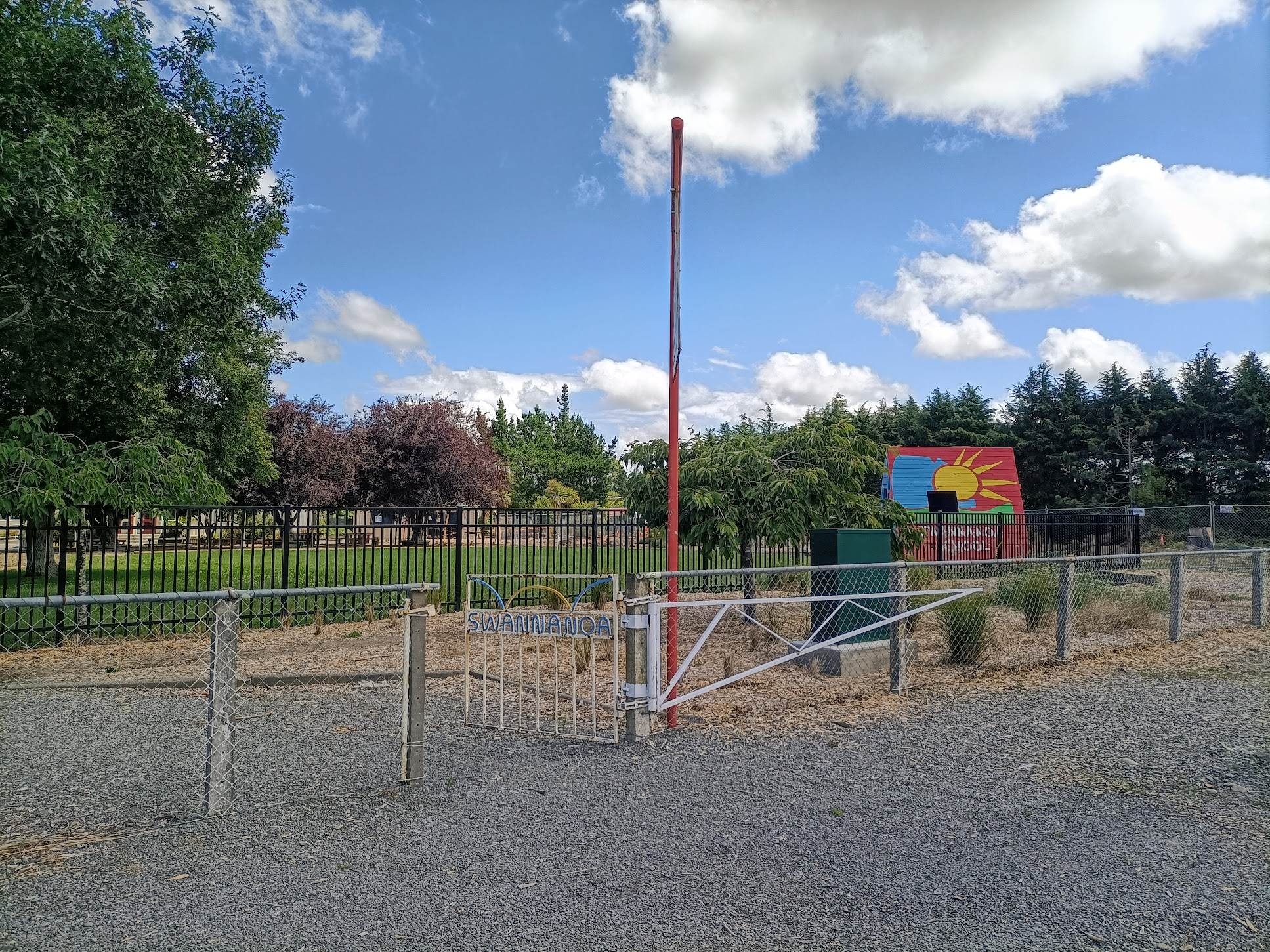
Swannanoa Primary School entrance

Te Koromiko Swannanoa School is a state co-educational full primary school, with a roll of 297 students (as of July 2026). It opened in 1871 as Mandeville Plains School and renamed to Swannanoa School in 1909. In 2021 it took its current name of Te Koromiko Swannanoa School.

== World land speed record ==
New Zealand motorcycle speed record holder Russell Wright gained the Motorcycle land-speed record, reaching 184.83 miles per hour on a Vincent-HRD Black Lightning motorcycle loaned by David Topliss, of Nelson on 2 July 1955, on Tram Road. A plaque commemorates the achievement.

Tram Road, the main road through Swannanoa, is an almost dead straight, 22 kilometre two-lane road. It is a popular location for speed trial events. This World Record is unusual as most that were officially recognised were achieved in the United States on open expanses of salt flat while this world record was achieved on a narrow, public road "still drying out from rain the night before".

After he had set one world record, Wright dismounted, and a Scottish immigrant, Bob Burns, attached a light sidecar to the Lightning. Burns then set another world record for sidecars. His two runs averaged 162 miles per hour (261 km/h)
