= Francis James Garrick =

New Zealand barrister and politician

Francis James Garrick member of parliament
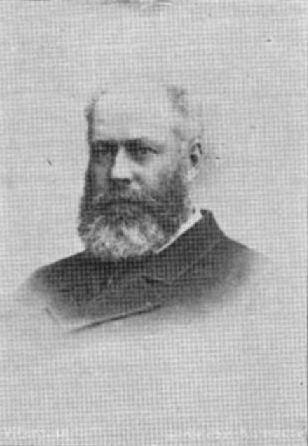
- Francis James Garrick

Canterbury Provincial Council
- In office 11 June 1866 – 1869
- Succeeded by: J. Inglis

Member of the New Zealand Parliament for St Albans
- In office 1884–1887
- Preceded by: John Evans Brown
- Succeeded by: William Pember Reeves
- Majority: 317

Personal details
- Born: 1833 Sydney or at sea
- Died: June 1890 (aged 56–57) Christchurch
- Spouse: Elizabeth Garrick (nee Peacock)
- Relations: James Francis Garrick – brother Joseph Garrick – brother John Thomas Peacock – brother in law
- Children: 6 sons, 3 daughters
- Profession: lawyer

Francis James Garrick (1833 – 7 June 1890) was a barrister and politician from Christchurch, New Zealand.

== Early years ==
Garrick was the oldest of ten children of James Francis Garrick (b. 1803 in Deptford, Kent, England; d. 1874 in Sydney) and Catherine Eliza Garrick (née Branson, b. 1811 in Gibraltar; d. 1900 in Woollahra, Australia). His parents were married on 10 June 1832 in St Martin-in-the-Fields, Surrey, England. They subsequently emigrated to Sydney to manage a flour milling business.

Garrick was born in 1833. There are conflicting reports whether this was at sea or when his parents had already arrived in Sydney. He was educated at Sydney College.

== Legal career ==
Both Garrick and his younger brother James Francis (born 10 January 1836) were sent to Sydney solicitors to learn the legal trade. The older brother spent time at Andrew McCulloch's office, and after that he worked for Robert Nicholls. After being admitted to the New South Wales' bar, he became a partner with Rowley and Holdsworth.

James Francis moved to Brisbane in 1861 where only four attorneys were in practice at that time, whilst Francis James emigrated to New Zealand in February 1864. He found a partner and set up the firm of Garrick and Cowlishaw, with their initial office fronting Cathedral Square, Christchurch. In 1883, they took on another partner and the practice was then known as Garrick, Cowlishaw and Fisher.

Garrick was highly respected in the New Zealand bar for his speaking talent.

== Political career ==
New Zealand Parliament
Years	Term	Electorate	Party
1884–1887	9th	St Albans	Independent

Garrick was a member of the Canterbury Provincial Council for three years. He was elected onto the council on 11 June 1866 for the City of Christchurch electorate. Immediately following his election, he was appointed Provincial Solicitor and thus became a member of the Executive Council; he remained on the Executive Council until 27 November of that year. On 3 June 1869, a by-election was held, as Garrick had resigned his seat the previous month. The election was won by J. Inglis unopposed.

In the 1884 New Zealand general election, he successfully stood for the St Albans electorate. He stood against two other candidates, Joseph Jebson and Thornhill Cooper, and gained a comfortable victory, gaining 396 out of 477 votes. Garrick stood again in the electorate in the 1887 election, against William Pember Reeves. At the election on 26 September, Reeves and Garrick received 802 and 634 votes, respectively. With a majority of 164 votes, Reeves was the successful candidate.

== Private life ==
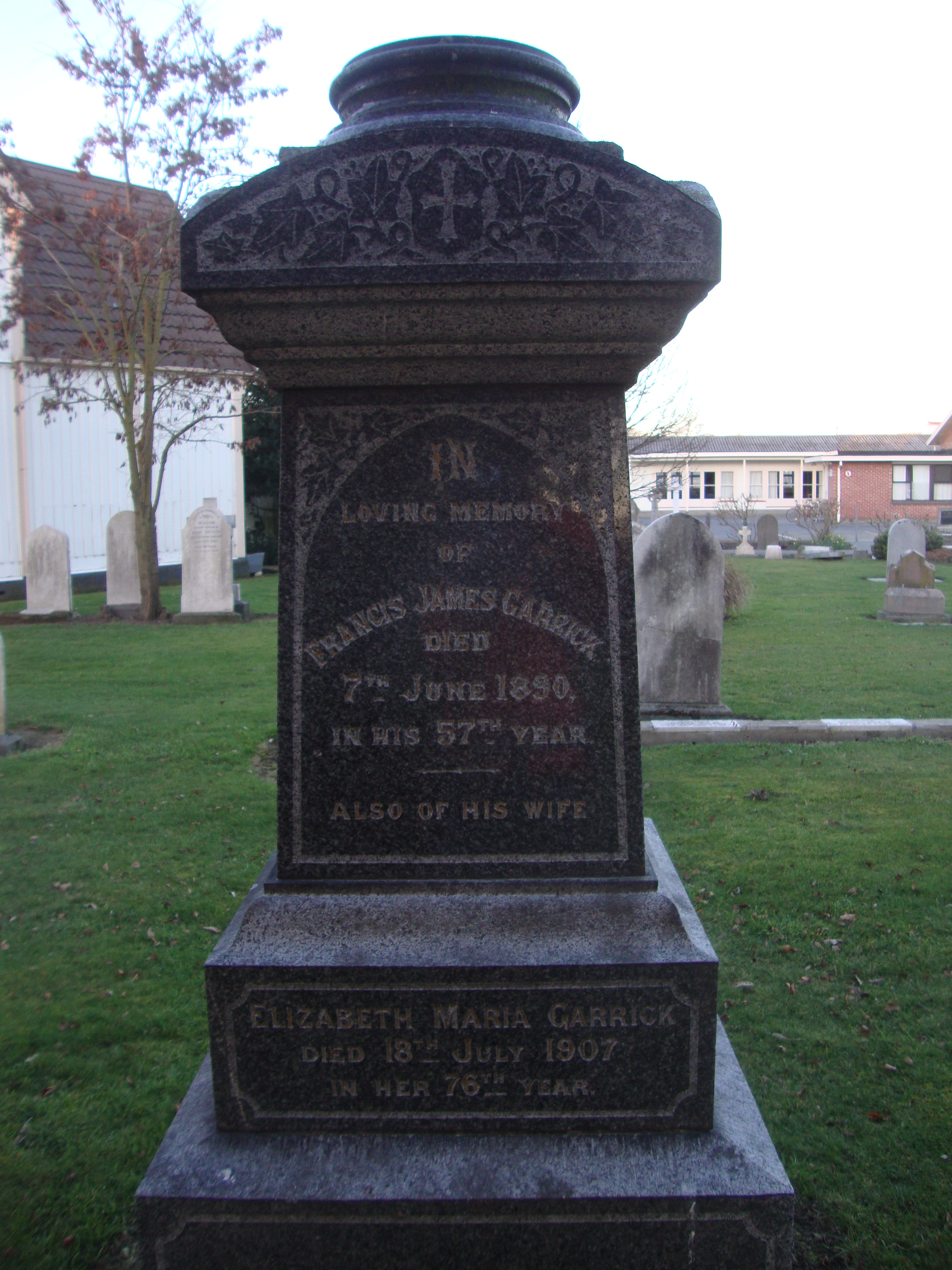
Garrick's grave stone at St Paul's Anglican Church in Papanui, Christchurch

Garrick was very involved with the Wesleyan Church, both in Sydney and in Christchurch. He had acted as a preacher and supported the church financially.

Soon after his arrival in Christchurch, he had Samuel Farr design him a house on Papanui Road. He married Elizabeth (née Peacock), the oldest sister of the Hon John Thomas Peacock (1827–1905). Peacock's mother Maria (1804/05–1884) shares a grave at Barbadoes Street Cemetery with many family members, including two Garrick children who died young: Kate (d. 27 March 1865 aged nine months) and Alfred Sydney (d. 17 March 1877 aged 6.5 years).

Garrick died on 7 June 1890 of bronchitis. He was survived by his wife Elizabeth, five sons, and two daughters. Together with the two children who died early, they thus had (at least) nine children. He was buried at the St Paul's Anglican Church Cemetery.

== Notes ==
New Zealand Parliament
Preceded by John Evans Brown	Member of Parliament for St Albans; 1884–1887	Succeeded by William Pember Reeves
