= 1868 Lyttelton by-election =

New Zealand by-election

The 1868 Lyttelton by-election was a by-election held on 2 November 1868 during the 4th New Zealand Parliament in the Canterbury electorate of Lyttelton.

The by-election was caused by the death of the incumbent MP George Macfarlan; he had been elected by the 1867 Lyttelton by-election.

The by-election was won by John Thomas Peacock. As there were no other candidates, he was declared duly elected.
