= St Albans (New Zealand electorate) =

St Albans was a parliamentary electorate in Christchurch, New Zealand, from 1881 to 1890, then from 1946 to 1996.

== Population centres ==
The previous electoral redistribution was undertaken in 1875 for the 1875–1876 election. In the six years since, New Zealand's European population had increased by 65%. In the 1881 electoral redistribution, the House of Representatives increased the number of European representatives to 91 (up from 84 since the 1875–76 election). The number of Māori electorates was held at four. The House further decided that electorates should not have more than one representative, which led to 35 new electorates being formed, including St Albans, and two electorates that had previously been abolished to be recreated. This necessitated a major disruption to existing boundaries.

The 1941 New Zealand census had been postponed due to World War II, so the 1946 electoral redistribution had to take ten years of population growth and movements into account. The North Island gained a further two electorates from the South Island due to faster population growth. The abolition of the country quota through the Electoral Amendment Act, 1945 reduced the number and increased the size of rural electorates. None of the existing electorates remained unchanged, 27 electorates were abolished, 19 electorates were created for the first time, and eight former electorates were re-established, including St Albans.

The electorate was centred on the Christchurch suburb of St Albans.

== History ==
The electorate was first created for the 1881 general election, held on 9 December.

John Evans Brown contested the electorate with J. L. Wilson and A. W. O'Neill. They received 218, 168 and 85 votes, respectively. Brown was declared elected. Brown did not stand for re-election in the 1884 general election.

In 1884 general election, held on 22 July, Francis James Garrick successfully stood for the electorate against two other candidates and obtained a comfortable victory, gaining 396 out of 477 votes. Garrick stood again in the electorate in the 1887 general election, against William Pember Reeves. At the election on 26 September, Reeves and Garrick received 802 and 634 votes, respectively. With a majority of 164 votes, Reeves was the successful candidate. The electorate was abolished at the end of the parliamentary term in 1890 and Reeves successfully contested the Christchurch electorate.

The electorate was recreated in 1946. Jack Watts from the National Party was the representative from 1946 to 1957, when he successfully contested the Fendalton electorate. St Albans went to Neville Pickering of the Labour Party, who lost the electorate at the next election in 1960 to National's Bert Walker. Walker represented St Albans until 1969, when he successfully contested the Papanui electorate.

St Albans was won by Labour's Roger Drayton in the 1969 general election. He retired after three terms, and the 1978 general election was won by Labour's David Caygill, who held the electorate until it was abolished in 1996. As the 1984 general election was held earlier than expected, the candidate of the New Zealand Party, Maurice Kattell, had the problem that his application for New Zealand citizenship had to be fast-tracked. Party officials went to Wellington to persuade the minister of internal affairs, Allan Highet, to use his discretionary powers. Ultimately, this approach proved successful, and Kattell received his citizenship in time.

=== Members of Parliament ===
The electorate was represented by eight Members of Parliament:

Key

Independent National Labour

Election	Winner
1881 election	John Brown
1884 election	Francis Garrick
1887 election	William Reeves
(electorate abolished 1890-1946)
1946 election	Jack Watts
1949 election	Jack Watts
1951 election	Jack Watts
1954 election	Jack Watts
1957 election	Neville Pickering
1960 election	Bert Walker
1963 election	Bert Walker
1966 election	Bert Walker
1969 election	Roger Drayton
1972 election	Roger Drayton
1975 election	Roger Drayton
1978 election	David Caygill
1981 election	David Caygill
1984 election	David Caygill
1987 election	David Caygill
1990 election	David Caygill
1993 election	David Caygill
(Electorate abolished in 1996; see Christchurch Central)

== Election results ==
=== 1993 election ===
1993 general election: St Albans
Party	Candidate	Votes	%	±%
Labour	David Caygill	10,022	46.43	−0.92
National	Raewyn Dawson	6,597	30.56	
Alliance	Mike Newlove	3,423	15.85	+5.77
NZ First	Peter Gordon	949	4.39	
Christian Heritage	Mary Lovell	481	2.22	
Natural Law	Joe Pickering	88	0.40	
Independent	Bill Bunting	25	0.11	
Majority		3,425	15.86	+8.47
Turnout		21,585	85.44	+0.91
Registered electors		25,261		

=== 1990 election ===
1990 general election: St Albans
Party	Candidate	Votes	%	±%
Labour	David Caygill	9,990	47.35	−11.05
National	David Dumergue	8,430	39.96	
NewLabour	Mike Newlove	2,127	10.08	
Democrats	John McCaskey	310	1.46	
McGillicuddy Serious	Michael Vercoe	209	0.99	
Communist League	Kerry Moyst	28	0.13	
Majority		1,560	7.39	−14.33
Turnout		21,094	84.53	−3.09
Registered electors		24,954		

=== 1987 election ===
1987 general election: St Albans
Party	Candidate	Votes	%	±%
Labour	David Caygill	12,166	58.40	+2.55
National	Andrew Cowie	7,641	36.68	
Democrats	Bill Morgan	593	2.84	
Socialist Action	Geoff Pearce	181	0.86	
Wizard Party	Suzanne Sadler	129	0.61	
Values	Phil McAnally	121	0.58	
Majority		4,525	21.72	−6.52
Turnout		20,831	87.62	−4.57
Registered electors		23,773		

=== 1984 election ===
1984 general election: St Albans
Party	Candidate	Votes	%	±%
Labour	David Caygill	12,208	55.85	+0.82
National	Ian Wilson	6,036	27.61	
NZ Party	Maurice Kattell	2,621	11.99	
Social Credit	Quinton Manson	990	4.52	−8.94
Majority		6,172	28.24	+4.72
Turnout		21,855	92.19	+2.81
Registered electors		23,704		

=== 1981 election ===
1981 general election: St Albans
Party	Candidate	Votes	%	±%
Labour	David Caygill	11,524	55.03	+2.31
National	Jim Baker	6,598	31.50	
Social Credit	Quinton Manson	2,819	13.46	+4.54
Majority		4,926	23.52	+16.19
Turnout		20,941	89.38	+22.42
Registered electors		23,428		

=== 1978 election ===
1978 general election: St Albans
Party	Candidate	Votes	%	±%
Labour	David Caygill	11,279	52.72	
National	Neil Russell	7,600	35.52	
Social Credit	Quinton Manson	1,909	8.92	+5.44
Values	Conway Jack	577	2.69	
Tory	Ian Douglas Costello	28	0.13	
Majority		1,570	7.33	
Turnout		21,393	66.96	−12.93
Registered electors		31,946		

=== 1975 election ===
1975 general election: St Albans
Party	Candidate	Votes	%	±%
Labour	Roger Drayton	9,013	48.59	−7.43
National	Prudence Rotherberg	7,443	40.13	
Values	Roger Wilson	1,304	7.03	
Social Credit	Quinton Manson	647	3.48	
Independent	Richard Dawson	104	0.56	
Imperial British Conservative	Alice Flett	36	0.19	
Majority		1,570	8.46	−8.89
Turnout		18,547	79.89	−6.64
Registered electors		23,214		

=== 1972 election ===
1972 general election: St Albans
Party	Candidate	Votes	%	±%
Labour	Roger Drayton	9,900	56.02	+6.41
National	Ron Doak	6,834	38.67	
Social Credit	Carol Flint	514	2.90	
Values	Bob Overend	376	2.12	
New Democratic	Bob Scott	47	0.26	
Majority		3,066	17.35	+12.00
Turnout		17,671	86.53	+2.92
Registered electors		20,420		

=== 1969 election ===
1969 general election: St Albans
Party	Candidate	Votes	%	±%
Labour	Roger Drayton	8,415	49.61	
National	Ian Wilson	7,506	44.25	
Social Credit	Jim Fountain	1,041	6.13	
Majority		909	5.35	
Turnout		16,962	89.45	+3.66
Registered electors		18,961		

=== 1966 election ===
1966 general election: St Albans
Party	Candidate	Votes	%	±%
National	Bert Walker	8,455	53.62	−1.72
Labour	Ted Adcock	5,880	37.29	
Social Credit	Ray McNeil	1,344	8.52	
Keynesian Progress	Mark Sadler	88	0.55	
Majority		2,575	16.33	+1.33
Turnout		15,767	85.79	−5.36
Registered electors		18,378		

=== 1963 election ===
1963 general election: St Albans
Party	Candidate	Votes	%	±%
National	Bert Walker	9,228	55.34	+6.74
Labour	John Palmer	6,727	40.34	
Social Credit	Carol Flint	718	4.30	
Majority		2,501	15.00	+13.15
Turnout		16,673	91.15	+0.10
Registered electors		18,291		

=== 1960 election ===
1960 general election: St Albans
Party	Candidate	Votes	%	±%
National	Bert Walker	7,809	48.60	
Labour	Neville Pickering	7,511	46.75	−3.28
Social Credit	George Richard Lynne	746	4.64	
Majority		298	1.85	
Turnout		16,066	91.25	−0.70
Registered electors		17,605		

=== 1957 election ===
1957 general election: St Albans
Party	Candidate	Votes	%	±%
Labour	Neville Pickering	7,960	50.03	
National	Eric Philip Wills	7,459	46.88	
Social Credit	Thomas Francis Penrose	759	4.77	
Majority		501	3.14	
Turnout		15,908	91.95	+0.42
Registered electors		17,299		

=== 1954 election ===
1954 general election: St Albans
Party	Candidate	Votes	%	±%
National	Jack Watts	6,905	43.58	−11.49
Labour	Mick Connelly	6,297	39.75	
Social Credit	Stanley William Ayers	2,639	16.65	
Majority		608	3.83	−6.32
Turnout		15,841	92.37	+2.29
Registered electors		17,148		

=== 1951 election ===
1951 general election: St Albans
Party	Candidate	Votes	%	±%
National	Jack Watts	7,675	55.07	+0.85
Labour	John Bernard Mora	6,260	44.93	
Majority		1,415	10.15	+1.71
Turnout		13,935	90.08	−3.10
Registered electors		15,469		

=== 1949 election ===
1949 general election: St Albans
Party	Candidate	Votes	%	±%
National	Jack Watts	7,335	54.22	+3.90
Labour	George Manning	6,193	45.78	
Majority		1,142	8.44	+7.80
Turnout		13,528	93.18	+1.19
Registered electors		14,518		

=== 1946 election ===
1946 general election: St Albans
Party	Candidate	Votes	%	±%
National	Jack Watts	6,691	50.32	
Labour	Morgan Williams	6,605	49.68	
Majority		86	0.64	
Turnout		13,296	91.99	
Registered electors		14,453		
